= List of Dolichopodidae genera =

The fly family Dolichopodidae contains approximately 250 genera. These include:

== Subfamily Achalcinae ==
- Achalcus Loew, 1857
- Apterachalcus Bickel, 1992
- Australachalcus Pollet, 2005
- Scepastopyga Grootaert & Meuffels, 1997
- Xanthina Aldrich, 1902

== Subfamily Antyxinae ==
- Antyx Meuffels & Grootaert, 1991

== Subfamily Babindellinae ==
- Babindella Bickel, 1987

== Subfamily Diaphorinae ==
- Achradocera Becker, 1922
- Aphasmaphleps Grichanov, 2010
- Argyra Macquart, 1834
- Asyndetus Loew, 1869
- Chrysotus Meigen, 1824
- Cryptophleps Lichtwardt, 1898
- Dactylonotus Parent, 1934
- Diaphorus Meigen, 1824
- Dubius Wei, 2012
- Emiratomyia Naglis, 2014
- Falbouria Dyte, 1980
- Keirosoma Van Duzee, 1929
- Lyroneurus Loew, 1857
- Melanostolus Kowarz, 1884
- Nurteria Dyte & Smith, 1980
- Ostenia Hutton, 1901
- †Palaeoargyra Meunier, 1895
- Phasmaphleps Bickel, 2005
- †Prochrysotus Meunier, 1907
- Pseudargyra Van Duzee, 1930
- Shamshevia Grichanov, 2012
- Somillus Brèthes, 1924
- Symbolia Becker, 1922
- Terpsimyia Dyte, 1975
- Trigonocera Becker, 1902

== Subfamily Dolichopodinae ==
- Afrohercostomus Grichanov, 2010
- Afroparaclius Grichanov, 2006
- Afropelastoneurus Grichanov, 2006
- Ahercostomus Yang & Saigusa, 2001
- Ahypophyllus Zhang & Yang, 2005
- Allohercostomus Yang, Saigusa & Masunaga, 2001
- Anasyntormon Dyte, 1975
- Apelastoneurus Grichanov, 2006
- Aphalacrosoma Zhang & Yang, 2005
- Argyrochlamys Lamb, 1922
- †Arpactodolichopodites Hong, 2002 (unavailable name)
- Cheiromyia Dyte, 1980
- †Convexivertex Hong, 2002 (unavailable name)
- Dolichopus Latreille, 1796
- Ethiromyia Brooks in Brooks & Wheeler, 2005
- †Eoeuryopterites Hong, 2002 (unavailable name)
- †Fushuniregis Evenhuis in Evenhuis & Bickel, 2021 (formerly Wangia Hong, 2002, junior homonym of Wangia Fowler, 1954)
- Gymnopternus Loew, 1857
- Hercostomus Loew, 1857
- †Leptodolichopodites Hong, 2002
- Lichtwardtia Enderlein, 1912
- Metaparaclius Becker, 1922
- Muscidideicus Becker, 1917
- Neohercostomus Grichanov, 2011
- †Orbicapitis Hong, 2002 (unavailable name)
- Ortochile Latreille, 1809
- Paraclius Loew, 1864
- Parahercostomus Yang, Saigusa & Masunaga, 2001
- Pelastoneurus Loew, 1861
- Phoomyia Naglis & Grootaert, 2013
- Platyopsis Parent, 1929
- Poecilobothrus Mik, 1878
- †Prohercostomus Grichanov, 1997
- Pseudargyrochlamys Grichanov, 2006
- Pseudoparaclius Grichanov, 2006
- Pseudopelastoneurus Grichanov, 2006
- Rhinoceromyia Grichanov, 2024
- Setihercostomus Zhang & Yang, 2005
- Srilankamyia Naglis, Grootaert & Wei, 2011
- Stenopygium Becker, 1922
- Sybistroma Meigen, 1824
- Tachytrechus Haliday in Walker, 1851

== Subfamily Enliniinae ==
- Enlinia Aldrich, 1933
- Harmstonia Robinson, 1964

== Subfamily †Eodolichopoditinae ==
- †Bicercites Hong, 2002 (unavailable name)
- †Columnocorna Hong, 2002 (unavailable name)
- †Eodolichopodites Hong, 2002 (unavailable name)
- †Haodolichopodites Hong, 2002 (unavailable name)
- †Laticopulus Hong, 2002 (unavailable name)
- †Longilabia Hong, 2002 (unavailable name)
- †Orbilabia Hong, 2002
- †Paradolichopodites Hong, 2002 (unavailable name)
- †Septocellula Hong, 1981
- †Sinodolichopodites Hong, 2002 (unavailable name)
- †Sunodolichopodites Hong, 2002 (unavailable name)

== Subfamily Hydrophorinae ==
- Abatetia Miller, 1945
- Acymatopus Takagi, 1965
- Anahydrophorus Becker, 1917
- Aphrosylopsis Lamb, 1909
- Aphrosylus Haliday in Walker, 1851
- Cemocarus Meuffels & Grootaert, 1984
- Conchopus Takagi, 1965
- Coracocephalus Mik, 1892
- Cymatopus Kertész, 1901
- Diostracus Loew, 1861
  - Lagodechia Negrobov & Zurikov, 1996
  - Ozmena Özdikmen, 2010
  - Sphyrotarsus Mik, 1874
- Epithalassius Mik, 1891
- Eucoryphus Mik, 1869
- Helichochaetus Parent, 1933
- Hydatostega Philippi, 1865
- Hydrophorus Fallén, 1823
- Hypocharassus Mik, 1879
- Liancalomima Stackelberg, 1931
- Liancalus Loew, 1857
- Machaerium Haliday, 1832
- Mangrovomyia Grichanov & Gilasian, 2023
- Melanderia Aldrich, 1922
- Minjerribah Bickel, 2019
- Nanothinophilus Grootaert & Meuffels, 1998
- Oedematopiella Naglis, 2011
- Oedematopus Van Duzee, 1929
- Orthoceratium Schrank, 1803
- Paraliancalus Parent, 1938
- Paraliptus Bezzi, 1923
- Paralleloneurum Becker, 1902
- Paraphrosylus Becker, 1922
- Peodes Loew, 1857
- Rhynchoschizus Dyte, 1980
- Scellus Loew, 1857
- Scorpiurus Parent, 1933
- Teneriffa Becker, 1908
  - Prothambemyia Masunaga, Saigusa & Grootaert, 2005
- Thambemyia Oldroyd, 1956
- Thinolestris Grootert & Meuffels, 1988
- Thinophilus Wahlberg, 1844
  - Parathinophilus Parent, 1932
  - Schoenophilus Mik, 1878

== Subfamily Kowmunginae ==
- Kowmungia Bickel, 1987
- Phacaspis Grootaert & Meuffels, 1988

== Subfamily Medeterinae ==
- Asioligochaetus Negrobov, 1966
- Atlatlia Bickel, 1986
- Cameroonomiya Grichanov, 2024
- Corindia Bickel, 1986
- Craterophorus Lamb, 1921
- Cryptopygiella Robinson, 1975
- Cyrturella Collin, 1952
- Demetera Grichanov, 2011
- Dolichophorus Lichtwardt, 1902
- Dominicomyia Robinson, 1975
- †Eridanomyia Bickel in Bickel & Martin, 2025
- Euxiphocerus Parent, 1935
- Grootaertia Grichanov, 1999
- †Kashubia Bickel in Bickel & Martin, 2025
- Maipomyia Bickel, 2004
- Medetera Fischer von Waldheim, 1819
- Medeterella Grichanov, 2011
- †Medeterites Grichanov, 2010
- Microchrysotus Robinson, 1964
- Microcyrtura Robinson, 1964
- Micromedetera Robinson, 1975
- Neomedetera Zhu, Yang & Grootaert, 2007
- Nikitella Grichanov, 2011
- †Palaeosystenus Grichanov, Negrobov & Selivanova, 2014
- †Paleothrypticus Ngô-Muller, Garrouste & Nel, 2020
- Papallacta Bickel, 2006
- Paramedetera Grootaert & Meuffels, 1997
- Pharcoura Bickel, 2007
- Pindaia Bickel, 2014
- †Plesiomedetera Grichanov, 2024
- Protomedetera Tang, Grootaert & Yang, 2018
- Saccopheronta Becker, 1914
- †Salishomyia Bickel, 2019
- †Systenites Grichanov, Negrobov & Selivanova, 2014
- Systenomorphus Grichanov, 2010
- Systenoneurus Grichanov, 2010
- Systenus Loew, 1857
- Thrypticus Gerstäcker, 1864
- Udzungwomyia Grichanov, 2018

== Subfamily Microphorinae ==
- †Avenaphora Grimaldi & Cumming, 1999
- †Curvus Kaddumi, 2005
- †Meghyperiella Meunier, 1908
- Microphor Macquart, 1827
- †Microphorites Hennig, 1971
- †Pristinmicrophor Tang, Shi, Wang & Yang, 2019
- Schistostoma Becker, 1902

== Subfamily Neurigoninae ==
- Arachnomyia White, 1916
- Argentinia Parent, 1931
- Bickelomyia Naglis, 2002
- Coeloglutus Aldrich, 1896
- Dactylomyia Aldrich, 1894
- Halteriphorus Parent, 1933
- Mberu Capellari & Amorim, 2011
- Naglisia Quevedo, Capellari & Lamas, 2024
- Naticornus Olejníček, 2005
- Neotonnoiria Robinson, 1970
- Neurigona Rondani, 1856
- Oncopygius Mik, 1866
- Paracoeloglutus Naglis, 2001
- Systenoides Naglis, 2001
- Viridigona Naglis, 2003

== Subfamily Parathalassiinae ==
- Amphithalassius Ulrich, 1991
- †Archichrysotus Negrobov, 1978
- Chimerothalassius Shamshev & Grootaert, 2003
- †Cretomicrophorus Negrobov, 1978
- †Electrophorella Cumming & Brooks, 2002
- Eothalassius Shamshev & Grootaert, 2005
- Microphorella Becker, 1909
- Neothalassius Brooks & Cumming, 2016
- Parathalassius Mik, 1891
- Plesiothalassius Ulrich, 1991
- †Retinitus Negrobov, 1978
- Thalassophorus Saigusa, 1986

== Subfamily Peloropeodinae ==
- Alishanimyia Bickel, 2007
- Chrysotimus Loew, 1857
- Cremmus Wei, 2006
- Discopygiella Robinson, 1965
- Fedtshenkomyia Stackelberg, 1927
- Griphophanes Grootaert & Meuffels, 1998
- Guzeriplia Negrobov, 1968
- Hadromerella De Meijere, 1916
- Korotongo Bickel, 2023
- Meuffelsia Grichanov, 2008
- Micromorphus Mik, 1878
- Nanomyina Robinson, 1964
- Neochrysotimus Yang, Saigusa & Masunaga, 2008
- Nepalomyia Hollis, 1964
- †Palaeomedeterus Meunier, 1895
- Peloropeodes Wheeler, 1890
- Pseudoxanthochlorus Negrobov, 1977
- Vetimicrotes Dyte, 1980

== Subfamily Plagioneurinae ==
- Plagioneurus Loew, 1857

== Subfamily Rhaphiinae ==
- Ngirhaphium Evenhuis & Grootaert, 2002
- Physopyga Grootaert & Meuffels, 1990
- Rhaphium Meigen, 1803

== Subfamily Sciapodinae ==
- Abbemyia Bickel, 1994
- Amblypsilopus Bigot, 1889
- Amesorhaga Bickel, 1994
- Austrosciapus Bickel, 1994
- Bickelia Grichanov, 1996
- Bickeliolus Grichanov, 1996
- Chrysosoma Guérin-Méneville, 1831
- Condylostylus Bigot, 1859
- Dytomyia Bickel, 1994
- Ethiosciapus Bickel, 1994
- Gigantosciapus Grichanov, 1997
- Helixocerus Lamb, 1929
- Heteropsilopus Bigot, 1859
- Krakatauia Enderlein, 1912
- Lapita Bickel, 2002
- Mascaromyia Bickel, 1994
- Mesorhaga Schiener, 1868
- Narrabeenia Bickel, 1994
- Naufraga Bickel, 1992
- Negrobovia Bickel, 1994
- Parentia Hardy, 1935
- Pilbara Bickel, 1994
- Plagiozopelma Enderlein, 1912
- Pouebo Bickel, 2008
- Pseudoparentia Bickel, 1994
- Sciapus Zeller, 1842
- Sinosciapus Yang, 2001
- †Wheelerenomyia Meunier, 1907

== Subfamily Stolidosomatinae ==
- Pseudosympycnus Robinson, 1967
- Stolidosoma Becker, 1922
- Sympycnidelphus Robinson, 1964

== Subfamily Sympycninae ==
- Brevimyia Miller, 1945
- Calyxochaetus Bigot, 1888
- Campsicnemus Haliday in Walker, 1851
- Chaetogonopteron De Meijere, 1913
- Colobocerus Parent, 1933
- Erebomyia Runyon & Hurley, 2005
- Filatopus Robinson, 1970
- Hercostomoides Meuffels & Grootaert, 1997
- Humongochela Evenhuis, 2004
- Hyptiocheta Becker, 1922
- Irwinus Grichanov, 2023
- Ischiochaetus Bickel & Dyte, 1989
- Lamprochromus Mik, 1878
- Liparomyia White, 1916
- Micropygus Bickel & Dyte, 1989
- Negrobovus Wang, Evenhuis, Ji, Yang & Zhang, 2021
- Neoparentia Robinson, 1967
- Nothorhaphium Bickel, 1999
- Olegonegrobovia Grichanov, 1995
- Parasyntormon Wheeler, 1899
- Pinacocerus Van Duzee, 1930
- Scelloides Bickel & Dyte, 1989
- Scotiomyia Meuffels & Grootaert, 1997
- Suschania Negrobov, 2003
- Sympycnus Loew, 1857
- Syntormon Loew, 1857
- Telmaturgus Mik, 1874
- Tetrachaetus Bickel & Dyte, 1989
- Teuchophorus Loew, 1857
- Yumbera Bickel, 1992

== Subfamily Tenuopodinae ==
- Tenuopus Curran, 1924

== Subfamily Xanthochlorinae ==
- Xanthochlorus Loew, 1857

== Subfamily incertae sedis ==
- Eurynogaster complex (Sympycninae or Hydrophorinae)
  - Adachia Evenhuis, 2005
  - Arciellia Evenhuis, 2005
  - Elmoia Evenhuis, 2005
  - Eurynogaster Van Duzee, 1933
  - Major Evenhuis, 2005
  - Sigmatineurum Parent, 1938
  - Sweziella Van Duzee, 1933
  - Uropachys Parent, 1935
- Acropsilus Mik, 1878 (unplaced in Dolichopodidae)
- Anepsiomyia Bezzi, 1902
- Binatangia Bickel in Bickel & Martin, 2020
- †Electrochoreutes Badano et al., 2023 (stem group of Dolichopodidae)
- †Gujaratmyia Bickel in Bickel et al., 2022
- Haplopharyngomyia Meuffels & Grootaert, 1999
- Haromyia Runyon, 2015 (Eniliniinae or Achalcinae)
- Hurleyella Runyon & Robinson, 2010
- Katangaia Parent, 1933
- Nematoproctus Loew, 1857 (Diaphorinae or Rhaphiinae)
- Nggela Bickel, 2020
- Notobothrus Parent, 1931
- Phrudoneura Meuffels & Grootaert, 1987
- †Prosystenus Negrobov, 1976
- Pseudohercostomus Stackelberg, 1931
- †Rajpardia Bickel in Bickel et al., 2022
- Urodolichus Lamb, 1922 (Diaphorinae or Rhaphiinae)
