= Acropsilus =

Scientific classification
- Kingdom: Animalia
- Phylum: Arthropoda
- Clade: Pancrustacea
- Class: Insecta
- Order: Diptera
- Family: Dolichopodidae
- Subfamily: incertae sedis
- Genus: Acropsilus; Mik, 1878

Type species
- Chrysotus niger Loew, 1869

Synonyms
- Campsicnemoides Curran, 1927; Nobilusa Wei, 2006

Genus of flies

Acropsilus is a genus of flies in the family Dolichopodidae. It is unplaced in the family, having been placed variously in subfamilies such as Sympycninae or Peloropeodinae. It is superficially similar to the Medeterinae.

== Species ==
The genus contains 30 species:

- Acropsilus albitibia Bickel, 1998
- Acropsilus boharti Bickel, 1998
- Acropsilus brevitalus (Parent, 1937)
- Acropsilus colmani Bickel, 1998
- Acropsilus eburneensis Couturier, 1978
- Acropsilus errabundus Lamb, 1922
- Acropsilus guangdongensis Wang, Yang & Grootaert, 2007
- Acropsilus guangxiensis Wang, Yang & Grootaert, 2007
- Acropsilus igori Negrobov, 1984
- Acropsilus jinxiuensis Wang, Yang & Grootaert, 2007
- Acropsilus kuranda Bickel, 1998
- Acropsilus luoxiangensis Wang, Yang & Grootaert, 2007
- Acropsilus malaita Bickel, 1998
- Acropsilus maprik Bickel, 1998
- Acropsilus minutulus (Vanschuytbroeck, 1951)
- Acropsilus minutus Hollis, 1964
- Acropsilus niger (Loew, 1869)
- Acropsilus nigricornis Bickel, 1998
- Acropsilus olegi Grichanov, 1998
- Acropsilus opipara (Wei, 2006)
- Acropsilus perminutus (Parent, 1937)
- Acropsilus protractus Robinson, 1963
- Acropsilus putosa Bickel, 1998
- Acropsilus stekolnikovi Grichanov, 1998
- Acropsilus toma Bickel, 1998
- Acropsilus udot Bickel, 1998
- Acropsilus vorax (Curran, 1927)
- Acropsilus yunnanensis Wang, Yang & Grootaert, 2007
- Acropsilus zengchenensis Wang, Yang & Grootaert, 2007
- Acropsilus zhuae Wang, Yang & Grootaert, 2007
