= Lamprochromus =

Scientific classification
- Kingdom: Animalia
- Phylum: Arthropoda
- Class: Insecta
- Order: Diptera
- Family: Dolichopodidae
- Subfamily: Sympycninae
- Genus: Lamprochromus; Mik, 1878

Type species
- Chrysotus elegans (= Medeterus bifasciatus Macquart, 1827) Meigen, 1830

Genus of flies

Lamprochromus is a genus of flies in the family Dolichopodidae. It is generally placed in the subfamily Sympycninae, though a molecular phylogenetic analysis of the family Dolichopodidae by Germann et al. (2011) suggested that the genus should be placed in the subfamily Rhaphiinae.

== Species ==
- Lamprochromus amabilis Parent, 1944 – China (Shaanxi)
- Lamprochromus belousovi (Grichanov, 2008) – DR Congo
- Lamprochromus bifasciatus (Macquart, 1827) – Europe
- Lamprochromus buchtojarovi Negrobov & Tshalaja, 1988 – Russia (Cheboksary)
- Lamprochromus canadensis (Van Duzee, 1917) (Synonym: Telmaturgus brevicornis Robinson, 1960) – Washington, Ontario, New York, North Carolina, Utah
- Lamprochromus dalmaticus Parent, 1927 – Croatia
- Lamprochromus defectivus Strobl, 1899 – Spain, ?Greece (Crete)
- Lamprochromus kowarzi Negrobov & Tshalaja, 1988 – Azerbaijan, Israel, Russia (Chechnya), Slovakia
- Lamprochromus moraviensis Negrobov & Tshalaja, 1988 – Czech Republic
- Lamprochromus occidasiaticus Grichanov & Ahmadi, 2017 – Iran, Turkey
- Lamprochromus occidentalis Robinson, 1967 – Nevada, Idaho
- Lamprochromus satrapa (Wheeler, 1890) – Nebraska
- Lamprochromus semiflavus (Strobl, 1880) (Synonym: L. strobli Parent, 1925) – Europe
- Lamprochromus speciosus (Loew, 1871) – Europe
