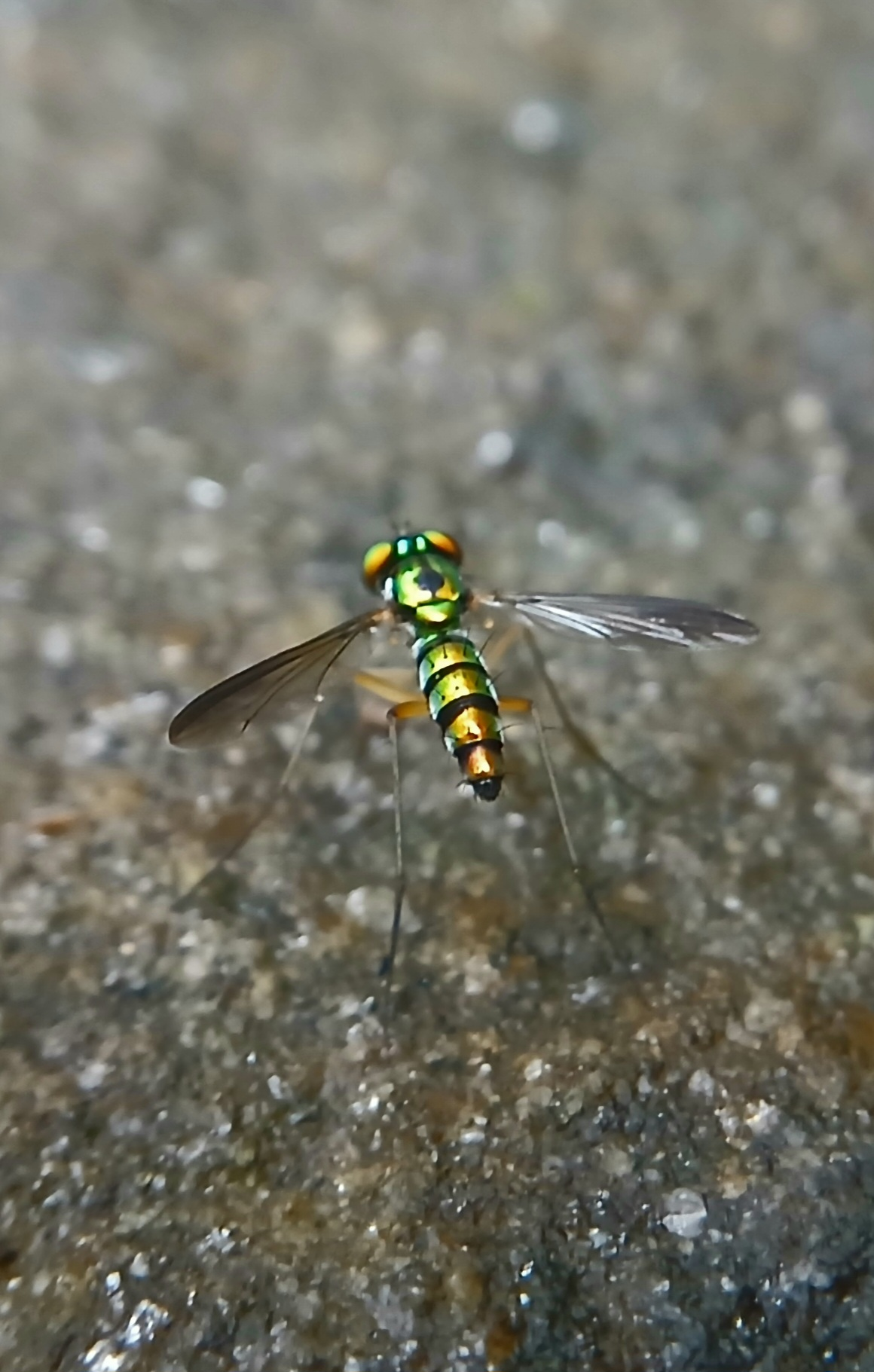

Scientific classification
- Kingdom: Animalia
- Phylum: Arthropoda
- Clade: Pancrustacea
- Class: Insecta
- Order: Diptera
- Family: Dolichopodidae
- Subfamily: Sciapodinae
- Tribe: Chrysosomatini
- Genus: Plagiozopelma; Enderlein, 1912

Type species
- Plagiozopelma spengeli (= Psilopus appendiculatus Bigot, 1890) Enderlein, 1912

= Plagiozopelma =

Genus of flies

Plagiozopelma is a genus of flies in the family Dolichopodidae. It is native to tropical regions of the Old World, and primarily lives in moist forests. The legs are typically elongate and pale yellow in colour, with the males often also having an elongate arista.

== Species ==
- Plagiozopelma albidum (Becker, 1922)
- Plagiozopelma albipatellatum (Parent, 1935)
- Plagiozopelma allectans (Walker, 1857)
- Plagiozopelma alliciens (Walker, 1857)
- Plagiozopelma alutiferum (Parent, 1934)
- Plagiozopelma amplipenne (Parent, 1941)
- Plagiozopelma angulitarse (Parent, 1933)
- Plagiozopelma angustifacies (Becker, 1922)
- Plagiozopelma annotatum (Becker, 1922)
- Plagiozopelma anuliseta (Enderlein, 1912)
- Plagiozopelma apicatum (Becker, 1922)
- Plagiozopelma appendiculatum (Bigot, 1890)
- Plagiozopelma arctifacies (Parent, 1935)
- Plagiozopelma argentifrons (Parent, 1935)
- Plagiozopelma ashbyi Bickel, 1994
- Plagiozopelma atropurpureum (Parent, 1939)
- Plagiozopelma aurifrons Bickel, 1994
- Plagiozopelma bellicum Bickel, 2005
- Plagiozopelma bequaerti (Curran, 1926)
- Plagiozopelma biseta Zhu, Masunaga & Yang, 2007
- Plagiozopelma brevarista Zhu & Yang, 2011
- Plagiozopelma brunnipenne (Becker, 1922)
- Plagiozopelma caeleste (Walker, 1849)
- Plagiozopelma capilliferum (Parent, 1933)
- Plagiozopelma collarti (Curran, 1927)
- Plagiozopelma congruens (Becker, 1922)
- Plagiozopelma conjectum (Parent, 1933)
- Plagiozopelma cordatum (De Meijere, 1914)
- Plagiozopelma cynicum (Parent, 1935)
- Plagiozopelma daveyi (Parent, 1939)
- Plagiozopelma defuense Yang, Grootaert & Song, 2002
- Plagiozopelma devoense Bickel, 2005
- Plagiozopelma discophorum (Frey, 1924)
- Plagiozopelma du (Curran, 1929)
- Plagiozopelma duplicatum (Becker, 1922)
- Plagiozopelma efatense Bickel, 2005
- Plagiozopelma elongatum (Becker, 1922)
- Plagiozopelma excisum (Becker, 1922)
- Plagiozopelma extractum (Becker, 1922)
- Plagiozopelma faciatum (Becker, 1922)
- Plagiozopelma flavicorne (Wiedemann, 1830)
- Plagiozopelma flavidum Zhu, Masunaga & Yang, 2007
- Plagiozopelma flavipodex (Becker, 1922)
- Plagiozopelma foliatum (Becker, 1922)
- Plagiozopelma fornatica Tang, Zhu & Yang, 2019
- Plagiozopelma grahami (Parent, 1939)
- Plagiozopelma grandiseta (Parent, 1932)
- Plagiozopelma grossum (Becker, 1922)
- Plagiozopelma impunctatum (Parent, 1934)
- Plagiozopelma indentatum (Parent, 1934)
- Plagiozopelma infirme (Becker, 1922)
- Plagiozopelma inops (Parent, 1929)
- Plagiozopelma inscriptum (Becker, 1922)
- Plagiozopelma kandyense (Hollis, 1964)
- Plagiozopelma laffooni Bickel, 2005
- Plagiozopelma latemarginatum (Parent, 1934)
- Plagiozopelma lichtwardti (Enderlein, 1912)
- Plagiozopelma limbatifrons (De Meijere, 1914)
- Plagiozopelma luchunanum Yang & Saigusa, 2001
- Plagiozopelma magniflavum Bickel & Wei, 1996
- Plagiozopelma medivittatum Bickel & Wei, 1996
- Plagiozopelma mezamense Grichanov, 2021
- Plagiozopelma micantifrons (Speiser, 1910)
- Plagiozopelma mimans (Parent, 1934)
- Plagiozopelma mirandum (Becker, 1922)
- Plagiozopelma mouldsorum Bickel, 1994
- Plagiozopelma nalense (Curran, 1926)
- Plagiozopelma negotiosum (Parent, 1935)
- Plagiozopelma nemocerum (Van der Wulp, 1895)
- Plagiozopelma nigricoxatum (Enderlein, 1912)
- Plagiozopelma niveoapicale (Frey, 1924)
- Plagiozopelma njalense (Parent, 1934)
- Plagiozopelma nonnitens (Parent, 1937)
- Plagiozopelma oculatum (Becker, 1922)
- Plagiozopelma ovale (Becker, 1922)
- Plagiozopelma pallidicorne (Curran, 1927)
- Plagiozopelma parapunctinerve (Hollis, 1964)
- Plagiozopelma petulans (Becker, 1922)
- Plagiozopelma piliseta (Parent, 1936)
- Plagiozopelma placidum Bickel, 1994
- Plagiozopelma principale (Becker, 1922)
- Plagiozopelma pubescens Yang, 1999
- Plagiozopelma punctiforme (Becker, 1922)
- Plagiozopelma punctinerve (Parent, 1935)
- Plagiozopelma ramiseta (Parent, 1939)
- Plagiozopelma rhopaloceras (De Meijere, 1914)
- Plagiozopelma santense Bickel, 2005
- Plagiozopelma satoi Yang, 1995
- Plagiozopelma shentorea (Hollis, 1964)
- Plagiozopelma spinicaudum Bickel, 2005
- Plagiozopelma strenuum (Parent, 1935)
- Plagiozopelma subpatellatum (Van der Wulp, 1895)
- Plagiozopelma subrectum (Walker, 1864)
- Plagiozopelma sukapisu Bickel, 2005
- Plagiozopelma terminiferum (Walker, 1858)
- Plagiozopelma tokotaai Bickel, 2005
- Plagiozopelma trifurcatum Yang, Grootaert & Song, 2002
- Plagiozopelma trilobata Tang, Zhu & Yang, 2019
- Plagiozopelma tritiseta (Parent, 1929)
- Plagiozopelma vagator (Becker, 1923)
- Plagiozopelma vitiense Bickel, 2005
- Plagiozopelma xanthocyaneum (Parent, 1934)
- Plagiozopelma xishuangbannanum Yang, Grootaert & Song, 2002
