= Sympycnus elegans =

Scientific classification
- Domain: Eukaryota
- Kingdom: Animalia
- Phylum: Arthropoda
- Class: Insecta
- Order: Diptera
- Family: Dolichopodidae
- Genus: Sympycnus
- Species: S. elegans

Binomial name
- Sympycnus elegans Parent 1932

Species of fly

Sympycnus elegans is a species of fly in the genus Sympycnus.
