= Brevimyia =

Scientific classification
- Kingdom: Animalia
- Phylum: Arthropoda
- Class: Insecta
- Order: Diptera
- Family: Dolichopodidae
- Subfamily: Sympycninae
- Genus: Brevimyia; Miller, 1945
- Species: B. pulverea

Binomial name
- Brevimyia pulverea (Parent, 1933)

Synonyms
- Genus: Brachymyia Parent, 1933 (nec Williston, 1882); Species: Brachymyia pulverea Parent, 1933

Genus of flies

Brevimyia is a genus of flies in the family Dolichopodidae. It contains only one species, Brevimyia pulverea, and is found in New Zealand. It was originally known as Brachymyia, named by Octave Parent in 1933. Later, David Miller found the name had already been used by the hoverfly genus Brachymyia (Williston, 1882), and renamed it to Brevimyia in 1945.
