= Peodes =

Scientific classification
- Kingdom: Animalia
- Phylum: Arthropoda
- Clade: Pancrustacea
- Class: Insecta
- Order: Diptera
- Family: Dolichopodidae
- Subfamily: Hydrophorinae
- Tribe: Epithalassiini
- Genus: Peodes; Loew, 1857

Type species
- Peodes forcipatus Loew, 1857

Genus of flies

Peodes is a genus of flies in the family Dolichopodidae, with three known species from the Palaearctic realm.

== Species ==
The following three species are included in the genus:

- Peodes forcipatus Loew, 1857 – Austria, Czech Republic, France, Germany, Hungary, Italy, Norway, Poland, Romania, Russia (Krasnodar, Saint Petersburg, Ural), Slovakia, Sweden, Switzerland
- Peodes petsamoensis Frey, 1930 – Czech Republic, Russia (Murmansk Oblast)
- Peodes yeniseiensis Grichanov, 2012 – Russia (Taymyr)

Unrecognised species:

- "Peodes" nicobarensis Schiner, 1868 – Nicobar Islands; considered a member of Sympycninae or Peloropeodinae
