= Calyxochaetus =

Scientific classification
- Kingdom: Animalia
- Phylum: Arthropoda
- Class: Insecta
- Order: Diptera
- Family: Dolichopodidae
- Subfamily: Sympycninae
- Genus: Calyxochaetus; Bigot, 1888

Type species
- Sympycnus nodatus Loew, 1862

Synonyms
- Nothosympycnus Wheeler, 1899

Genus of flies

Calyxochaetus is a genus of flies in the family Dolichopodidae. Formerly considered a subgenus of Sympycnus, it is now recognized as a distinct genus.

== Species ==
- Calyxochaetus arizonicus (Harmston, 1968)
- Calyxochaetus binodatus (Harmston & Knowlton, 1940)
- Calyxochaetus cilifemoratus (Van Duzee, 1924)
- Calyxochaetus clavicornis (Van Duzee, 1930)
- Calyxochaetus distortus (Van Duzee, 1930)
- Calyxochaetus fortunatus (Wheeler, 1899)
- Calyxochaetus frontalis (Loew, 1861)
- Calyxochaetus furcatus (Van Duzee, 1929)
- Calyxochaetus hardyi (Harmston & Knowlton, 1940)
- Calyxochaetus hastatus (Van Duzee, 1930)
- Calyxochaetus inornatus (Van Duzee, 1917)
- Calyxochaetus insolitus (Van Duzee, 1932)
- Calyxochaetus isoaristus (Harmston & Knowlton, 1940)
- Calyxochaetus lamellicornis Parent, 1930
- Calyxochaetus loewi Parent, 1930
- Calyxochaetus luteipes (Van Duzee, 1923)
- Calyxochaetus metatarsalis Robinson, 1966
- Calyxochaetus millardi Meuffels & Grootaert, 1999
- Calyxochaetus nodatus (Loew, 1862)
- Calyxochaetus oreas (Wheeler, 1899)
- Calyxochaetus ornatus Parent, 1930
- Calyxochaetus patellifer Parent, 1934
- Calyxochaetus pennarista (Harmston & Knowlton, 1940)
- Calyxochaetus pictipes (Harmston & Knowlton, 1940)
- Calyxochaetus sobrinus (Wheeler, 1899)
- Calyxochaetus tripilus (Van Duzee, 1930)
- Calyxochaetus unipilus (Van Duzee, 1929)
- Calyxochaetus vegetus (Wheeler, 1899)
