= Tenuopus =

Scientific classification
- Kingdom: Animalia
- Phylum: Arthropoda
- Class: Insecta
- Order: Diptera
- Family: Dolichopodidae
- Subfamily: Tenuopodinae; Grichanov, 2018
- Genus: Tenuopus; Curran, 1924

Type species
- Saucropus univittatus (misidentification) ( = Tenuopus erroneus Parent, 1934) Loew, 1858

Genus of flies

Tenuopus is a genus of flies in the family Dolichopodidae. It is the only genus in the subfamily Tenuopodinae, which was created by Igor Grichanov in 2018. The genus was previously placed in the subfamily Neurigoninae, and it also shares some features of Peloropeodinae and Sciapodinae. All species are known from the Afrotropical realm.

== Species ==
- Tenuopus acrosticalis Curran, 1927 – Burundi, Central African Republic, DR Congo, Ghana, Ivory Coast, Kenya, Nigeria, Uganda
- Tenuopus birketti Grichanov, 2019 – Mozambique, South Africa
- Tenuopus bururiensis Grichanov, 2018 – Burundi
- Tenuopus cognatus Parent, 1934 – South Africa
- Tenuopus comorensis Grichanov, 2019 – Comoros
- Tenuopus erroneus Parent, 1934 – South Africa
- Tenuopus frontalis Curran, 1927 – Congo-Brazzaville, Ghana, Nigeria, Sierra Leone
- Tenuopus fursovi Grichanov, 1996 – Liberia
- Tenuopus gorongosaensis Grichanov, 2018 – Mozambique
- Tenuopus guttatus Parent, 1939 – DR Congo, Ghana, Ivory Coast
- Tenuopus kononenkoi Grichanov, 1996 – Uganda
- Tenuopus kirkspriggsi Grichanov, 2018 – Burundi
- Tenuopus kylei Grichanov, 2018 – South Africa
- Tenuopus lomholdti Grichanov, 2018 – Tanzania
- Tenuopus maculatus Parent, 1931 – Kenya, Malawi, Tanzania
- Tenuopus makarovi Grichanov, 2021 – Tanzania
- Tenuopus ntchisi Grichanov, 2000 – Malawi
- Tenuopus shcherbakovi Grichanov, 1996 – Kenya, Tanzania, Uganda
- Tenuopus soderlundi Grichanov, 2018 – South Africa
- Tenuopus taitensis Grichanov, 2000 – Kenya
- Tenuopus unicolor (Becker, 1914) – DR Congo, Kenya
- Tenuopus zverevi Grichanov, 1996 – DR Congo
