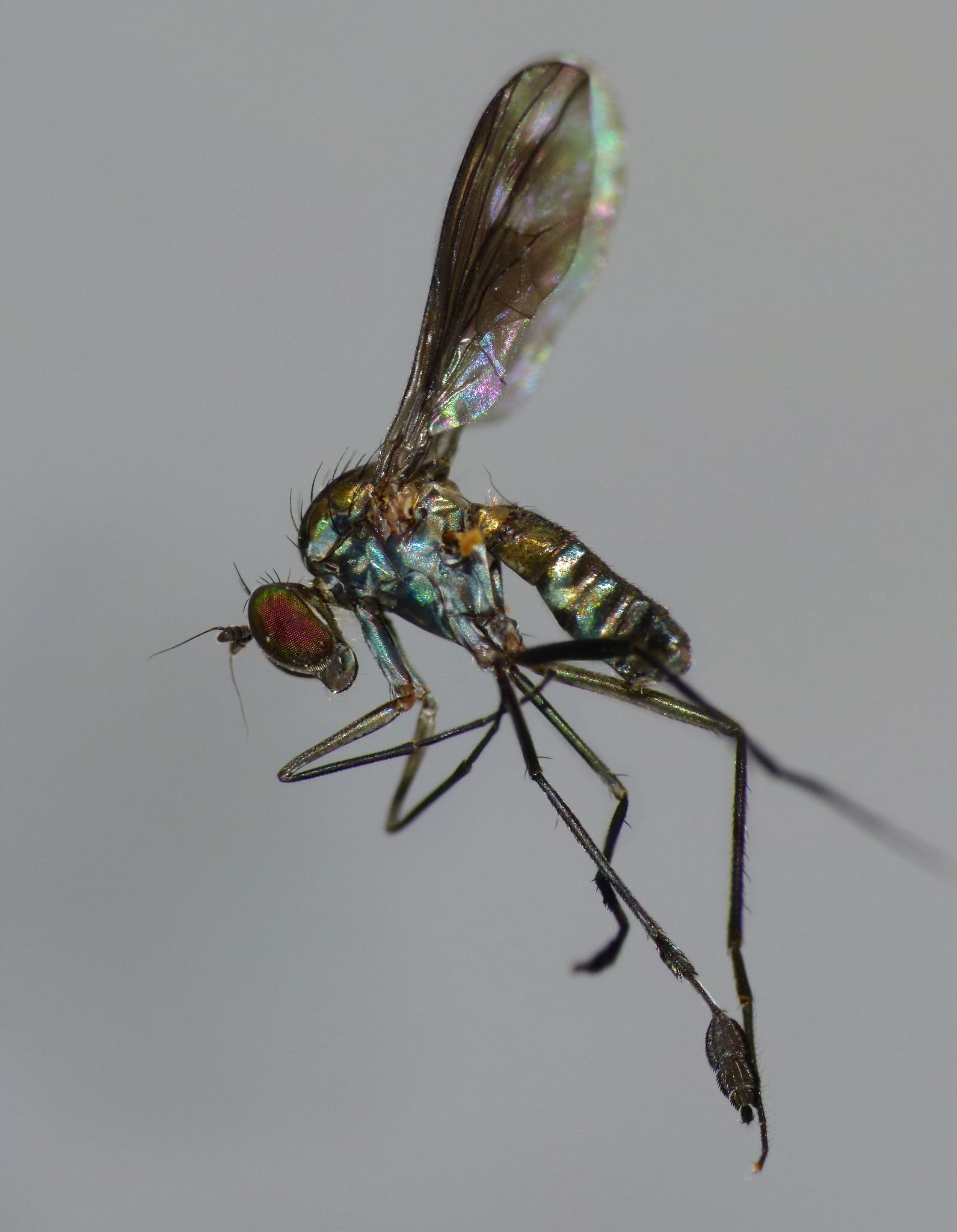
- Filatopus ornatus

Scientific classification
- Kingdom: Animalia
- Phylum: Arthropoda
- Class: Insecta
- Order: Diptera
- Family: Dolichopodidae
- Subfamily: Sympycninae
- Genus: Filatopus; Robinson, 1970

Type species
- Nematopus ciliatus Parent, 1933

Synonyms
- Filatopus Miller, 1945 (unavailable); Nematopus Parent, 1933 (nec Berthold, 1827, nec Agassiz, 1846, nec Sars, 1863)

= Filatopus =

Genus of flies

Filatopus is a genus of flies in the family Dolichopodidae. It is known from New Zealand and Argentina.

The genus was originally known as Nematopus, named by Octave Parent in 1933. Later, David Miller found the name to be preoccupied by Nematopus (Berthold, 1827), and renamed it to Filatopus in 1945. However, as Nematopus was not designated a type species, the name Filatopus was unavailable until 1970, when Harold E. Robinson designated Nematopus ciliatus as the type species.

== Species ==
- Filatopus ciliatus (Parent, 1933)
- Filatopus mirabilis (Parent, 1933)
- Filatopus nigripalpis (Van Duzee, 1930)
- Filatopus ornatus (Parent, 1933)
