= Colobocerus =

Scientific classification
- Kingdom: Animalia
- Phylum: Arthropoda
- Clade: Pancrustacea
- Class: Insecta
- Order: Diptera
- Family: Dolichopodidae
- Subfamily: Sympycninae
- Genus: Colobocerus; Parent, 1933
- Species: C. alchymicus

Binomial name
- Colobocerus alchymicus Parent, 1933

Synonyms
- Sympycnus alchymicus (Parent, 1933)

Genus of flies

Colobocerus is a genus of flies in the family Dolichopodidae, known from New Zealand. It contains only one species, Colobocerus alchymicus. According to Bickel (1992), Colobocerus should probably be treated as a synonym of Sympycnus. This suggestion has been followed by some modern treatments, but not by others.
