= Apelastoneurus =

Scientific classification
- Kingdom: Animalia
- Phylum: Arthropoda
- Clade: Pancrustacea
- Class: Insecta
- Order: Diptera
- Family: Dolichopodidae
- Subfamily: Dolichopodinae
- Genus: Apelastoneurus; Grichanov, 2006

Type species
- Pelastoneurus micrurus Parent, 1933

Genus of flies

Apelastoneurus is a genus of flies in the family Dolichopodidae. It includes 47 species from Africa formerly placed in Paracleius or Pelastoneurus (the former is now a synonym of the latter).

== Species ==
- Apelastoneurus abstrusus (Grichanov, 2004)
- Apelastoneurus aeptus (Grichanov, 2004)
- Apelastoneurus afromaculatus (Dyte & Smith, 1980)
- Apelastoneurus altimontanus (Grichanov, 2004)
- Apelastoneurus ambiguus (Parent, 1934)
- Apelastoneurus basilewskyi (Vanschuytbroeck, 1964)
- Apelastoneurus bequaerti (Curran, 1929)
- Apelastoneurus biadimbi (Grichanov, 2004)
- Apelastoneurus bissindza (Grichanov, 2004)
- Apelastoneurus bretoni (Grichanov, 2004)
- Apelastoneurus bururi (Grichanov, 2004)
- Apelastoneurus capensis (Parent, 1932)
- Apelastoneurus collarti (Curran, 1927)
- Apelastoneurus confusibilis (Parent, 1937)
- Apelastoneurus congoensis (Parent, 1933)
- Apelastoneurus dedegwa (Grichanov, 2004)
- Apelastoneurus dobronosovi (Grichanov, 2004)
- Apelastoneurus donskoffi (Grichanov, 2004)
- Apelastoneurus emasculatus (Parent, 1937)
- Apelastoneurus gabonensis (Grichanov, 2004)
- Apelastoneurus gracilis (Curran, 1924)
- Apelastoneurus ineditus (Parent, 1933)
- Apelastoneurus julius (Grichanov, 2004)
- Apelastoneurus kassebeeri (Grichanov, 2004)
- Apelastoneurus latipennis (Parent, 1931)
- Apelastoneurus leidenrothi (Grichanov, 2004)
- Apelastoneurus lippensi (Grichanov, 2004)
- Apelastoneurus machakos (Grichanov, 2004)
- Apelastoneurus microproctus (Parent, 1933)
- Apelastoneurus micrurus (Parent, 1933)
- Apelastoneurus miripennis (Grichanov, 2004)
- Apelastoneurus mottusi (Grichanov, 1999)
- Apelastoneurus naglisi (Grichanov, 2004)
- Apelastoneurus nebulo (Parent, 1933)
- Apelastoneurus neocongoensis (Grichanov, 2004)
- Apelastoneurus nigeriensis (Grichanov, 2004)
- Apelastoneurus nigripalpis (Grichanov, 2004)
- Apelastoneurus olejniceki (Grichanov, 2004)
- Apelastoneurus pectinifer (Parent, 1934)
- Apelastoneurus pedunculatus (Parent, 1933)
- Apelastoneurus reavelli (Grichanov, 2004)
- Apelastoneurus schoutedeni (Curran, 1927)
- Apelastoneurus solivagus (Lamb, 1922)
- Apelastoneurus vilkamaai (Grichanov, 2004)
- Apelastoneurus whittingtoni (Grichanov, 2004)
- Apelastoneurus zamotailovi (Grichanov, 2004)
- Apelastoneurus zonatus (Parent, 1931)
