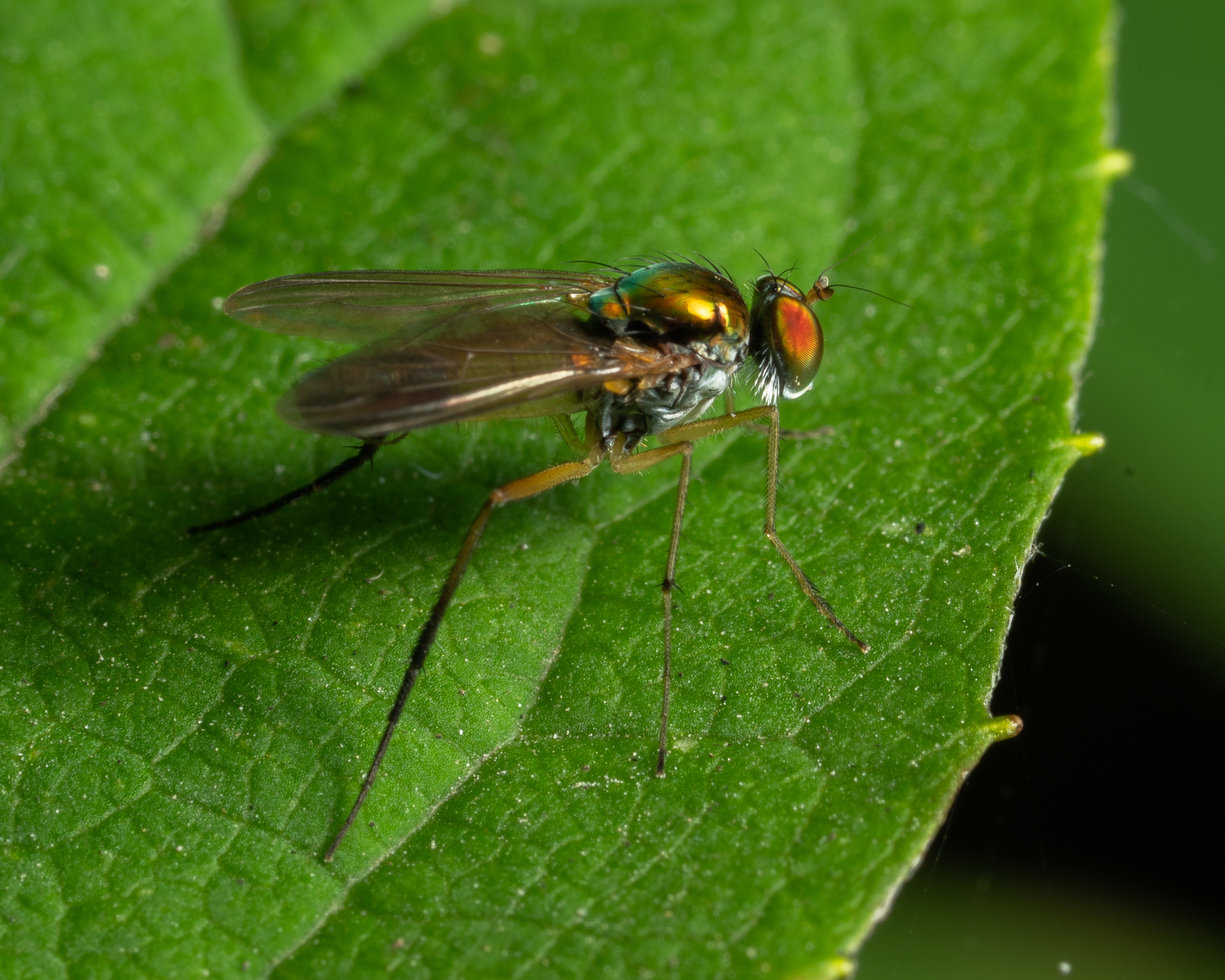
- Nematoproctus jucundus

Scientific classification
- Kingdom: Animalia
- Phylum: Arthropoda
- Class: Insecta
- Order: Diptera
- Family: Dolichopodidae
- Subfamily: incertae sedis
- Genus: Nematoproctus; Loew, 1857

Type species
- Porphyrops annulata Macquart, 1827

= Nematoproctus =

Genus of flies

Nematoproctus is a genus of flies in the family Dolichopodidae. It has an uncertain position in the family; different authors have included the genus in the subfamily Diaphorinae or the subfamily Rhaphiinae.

== Species ==
- Nematoproctus caelebs Parent, 1926 – China (Shanghai)
- Nematoproctus cylindricus (Van Duzee, 1924) – Canada
- Nematoproctus daubichensis Stackelberg & Negrobov, 1976 – Russia (Primorye)
- Nematoproctus distendens (Meigen, 1824) – Europe
- Nematoproctus flavicoxa Van Duzee, 1930 – United States
- Nematoproctus jucundus Van Duzee, 1927 – United States
- Nematoproctus kumazawai Negrobov, Tago & Maslova, 2018 – Japan
- Nematoproctus longifilus Loew, 1857 – Europe
- Nematoproctus metallicus Van Duzee, 1930 – United States
- Nematoproctus praesectus Loew, 1869 – Europe
- Nematoproctus terminalis (Van Duzee, 1914) – United States
- Nematoproctus varicoxa Van Duzee, 1930 – United States
- Nematoproctus venustus Melander, 1900 – United States
