= Telmaturgus =

- Telmaturgus vockerothi

Scientific classification
- Kingdom: Animalia
- Phylum: Arthropoda
- Clade: Pancrustacea
- Class: Insecta
- Order: Diptera
- Family: Dolichopodidae
- Subfamily: Sympycninae
- Genus: Telmaturgus; Mik, 1874

Type species
- Sympycnus tumidulus Raddatz, 1873

Synonyms
- Syntormoneura Curran, 1926

Genus of flies

Telmaturgus is a genus of flies in the family Dolichopodidae. It has a cosmopolitan distribution.

== Species ==
- Telmaturgus abidjanensis (Grichanov, 2008) – Ivory Coast
- Telmaturgus acutatus (Yang & Grootaert, 1999) – China (Yunnan)
- Telmaturgus chebalingensis (Wang, Yang & Grootaert, 2005) – China (Guangdong)
- Telmaturgus concavus (Yang & Grootaert, 1999) – China (Yunnan)
- Telmaturgus congensis Grichanov, 2011 – DR Congo
- Telmaturgus costaricensis Robinson, 1967 – Costa Rica
- Telmaturgus dorsiniger (Yang & Grootaert, 1999) – China (Yunnan)
- Telmaturgus garambaensis (Grichanov, 2008) – DR Congo, Gabon
- Telmaturgus kenyensis (Grichanov, 2008) – Kenya
- Telmaturgus kovali (Grichanov, 2008) – DR Congo, Gabon
- Telmaturgus kwandensis (Grichanov, 2008) – Madagascar, Namibia
- Telmaturgus mastigomyoformis (Grichanov, 2008) – DR Congo
- Telmaturgus mulleri Grichanov, 2018 – South Africa
- Telmaturgus munroi (Curran, 1925) – Burundi, DR Congo, Gabon, Gambia, Ivory Coast, Kenya, Namibia, Rwanda, Sierra Leone, South Africa, Tanzania, Zimbabwe, Cameroon, Ethiopia
- Telmaturgus parvus (Van Duzee, 1924) – Canada, United States
- Telmaturgus pseudoviolaceus (Grichanov, 2008) – Ivory Coast
- Telmaturgus pulchrithorax Hollis, 1964 – Indonesia
- Telmaturgus revanasiddaiahi (Olejníček, 2002) – India (Bangalore)
- Telmaturgus robinsoni Runyon, 2012 – Canada, United States
- Telmaturgus semarangensis Hollis, 1964 – Indonesia
- Telmaturgus shettyi (Olejníček, 2002) – India (Bangalore)
- Telmaturgus silvestris Grichanov, 2018 – DR Congo
- Telmaturgus simplicipes (Becker, 1908) – Europe, Africa, Asia, Australasia, Hawaii
- Telmaturgus singularis (Yang & Grootaert, 1999) – China (Yunnan)
- Telmaturgus triseta (Grichanov, 2008) – Ivory Coast, Namibia, Mauritius
- Telmaturgus tumidulus (Raddatz, 1873) – Europe, Central Asia
- Telmaturgus uzungwa (Grichanov, 2008) – Tanzania
- Telmaturgus vockerothi Runyon, 2012 – Canada
- Telmaturgus wonosoboensis Hollis, 1964 – Indonesia

The following species were moved to Chaetogonopteron:

- Telmaturgus nodicornis (Becker, 1922)
