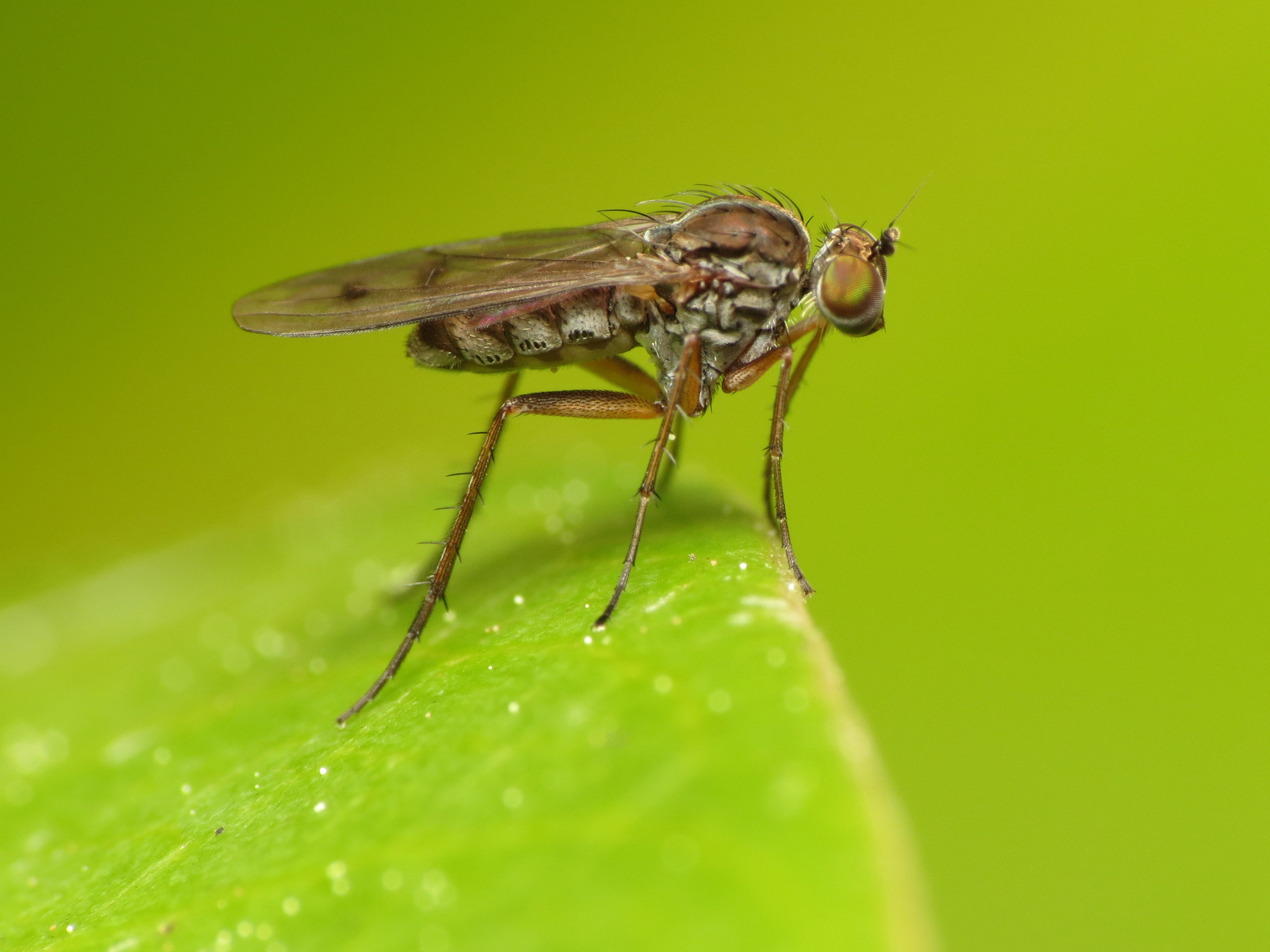
- Tetrachaetus bipunctatus

Scientific classification
- Kingdom: Animalia
- Phylum: Arthropoda
- Class: Insecta
- Order: Diptera
- Family: Dolichopodidae
- Subfamily: Sympycninae
- Genus: Tetrachaetus; Bickel & Dyte, 1989
- Species: T. bipunctatus

Binomial name
- Tetrachaetus bipunctatus Parent, 1933

Synonyms
- Genus: Tetrachaetus Parent, 1933 (unavailable); Species: Tetrachaetus simplex Parent, 1933

= Tetrachaetus =

Genus of flies

Tetrachaetus is a monospecific genus of flies in the family Dolichopodidae, found in New Zealand, containing only the species Tetrachaetus bipunctatus. The genus was originally named by Octave Parent in 1933 and originally included two species. However, as the genus was not designated a type species, this name was unavailable until 1989, when Daniel J. Bickel and C. E. Dyte designated Tetrachaetus bipunctatus as the type species.

The two species that were part of this genus, T. bipunctus and T. simplex, were found to be conspecific and were synonymised under Tetrachaetus bipunctatus Parent (1933) in 2025.
