= Liparomyia =

Scientific classification
- Kingdom: Animalia
- Phylum: Arthropoda
- Clade: Pancrustacea
- Class: Insecta
- Order: Diptera
- Family: Dolichopodidae
- Subfamily: Sympycninae
- Genus: Liparomyia; White, 1916

Type species
- Liparomyia sedata White, 1916

Genus of flies

Liparomyia is a genus of flies in the family Dolichopodidae, known from Australia.

== Species ==
- Liparomyia sedata White, 1916 – Tasmania
- Liparomyia separata (Parent, 1932) – Australian Capital Territory
