= Teuchophorus =

Scientific classification
- Kingdom: Animalia
- Phylum: Arthropoda
- Class: Insecta
- Order: Diptera
- Family: Dolichopodidae
- Subfamily: Sympycninae
- Genus: Teuchophorus; Loew, 1857

Type species
- Dolichopus spinigerellus Zetterstedt, 1843

Synonyms
- Paresus Wei, 2006; Olegonegrobovia Grichanov, 1995; Mastigomyia Becker, 1924; Teuchophora Loew, 1857; Teuchrophorus Loew, 1857; Teucophorus Loew, 1857; Teucophorus Loew, 1857

Genus of flies

video

Teuchophorus is a genus of long-legged flies in the family Dolichopodidae. There are more than 130 described species in Teuchophorus.

== Species ==
These 135 species belong to the genus Teuchophorus:

- Teuchophorus acinaces Meuffels & Grootaert, 2004
- Teuchophorus acuminatus Grootaert, 2006
- Teuchophorus amami (Bickel, 1999)
- Teuchophorus angulus Wei & Yang, 2007
- Teuchophorus anomalicerus (Hollis, 1964)
- Teuchophorus anomalus Meuffels & Grootaert, 2004 (Note: Not listed in Catalogue of Life.)
- Teuchophorus antennatus Grootaert, 2006
- Teuchophorus armatulus Meuffels & Grootaert, 1986
- Teuchophorus barkalovi (Grichanov, 1995) (Note: Also considered a member of the genus Olegonegrobovia.)
- Teuchophorus balearicus (Tsacas, 1960)
- Teuchophorus bipilosus Becker, 1908
- Teuchophorus bisetus Loew, 1871
- Teuchophorus brachystigma Meuffels & Grootaert, 2004
- Teuchophorus bulohensis Grootaert, 2006
- Teuchophorus calcaratus (Macquart, 1828)
- Teuchophorus caprivi Grichanov, 2000
- Teuchophorus chaetifemoratus Pollet & Kechev, 2007
- Teuchophorus chaetulosus Meuffels & Grootaert, 2004
- Teuchophorus clavigerellus Wheeler, 1899
- Teuchophorus condylus Harmston & Knowlton, 1946
- Teuchophorus conspicuus Meuffels & Grootaert, 1986
- Teuchophorus costalis Meuffels & Grootaert, 1986
- Teuchophorus couturieri (Grichanov, 2000)
- Teuchophorus cristulatus Meuffels & Grootaert, 1991
- Teuchophorus crobylotus Meuffels & Grootaert, 2004
- Teuchophorus cteniuchus Meuffels & Grootaert, 2004
- Teuchophorus ctenomerus Meuffels & Grootaert, 2004
- Teuchophorus daugeroni (Grichanov, 2000)
- Teuchophorus dentatus Wei & Yang, 2007
- Teuchophorus denticulatus Meuffels & Grootaert, 1986
- Teuchophorus digitatus Meuffels & Grootaert, 1986
- Teuchophorus diminucosta Harmston & Knowlton, 1942
- Teuchophorus dimorphus Meuffels & Grootaert, 2004
- Teuchophorus elongatus Wang, Yang & Grootaert, 2006
- Teuchophorus emeiensis Yang & Saigusa, 2000
- Teuchophorus enormis Meuffels & Grootaert, 2004
- Teuchophorus ensicornis Meuffels & Grootaert, 2004
- Teuchophorus eurystigma Meuffels & Grootaert, 2004
- Teuchophorus femoratus Meuffels & Grootaert, 1986
- Teuchophorus fimbritibia Meuffels & Grootaert, 2004
- Teuchophorus fluvius Wei, 2006
- Teuchophorus fracidus Wei & Yang, 2007
- Teuchophorus fulvescens Meuffels & Grootaert, 2004
- Teuchophorus fuscicornis Meuffels & Grootaert, 1986
- Teuchophorus fuscihalteratus Meuffels & Grootaert, 2004
- Teuchophorus gissaricus Negrobov & Grichanov, 1982
- Teuchophorus gladiator Meuffels & Grootaert, 2004
- Teuchophorus grandior Meuffels & Grootaert, 1986
- Teuchophorus grandis Meuffels & Grootaert, 2004
- Teuchophorus gratiosus (Becker, 1924)
- Teuchophorus guangdongensis Wang, 2006
- Teuchophorus gymnogynus Meuffels & Grootaert, 2004
- Teuchophorus hirsutus Meuffels & Grootaert, 2004
- Teuchophorus humilis Meuffels & Grootaert, 2004
- Teuchophorus hypnosus Wei, Zhang & Yang, 2010
- Teuchophorus hypogaeusus Wei, Zhang & Yang, 2010
- Teuchophorus israelensis Grichanov, Negrobov & Selivanova, 2012
- Teuchophorus jejunus Wei, Zhang & Yang, 2010
- Teuchophorus jucundus Wei, Zhang & Yang, 2010
- Teuchophorus ketudatae Meuffels & Grootaert, 2004
- Teuchophorus krabiensis Meuffels & Grootaert, 2004
- Teuchophorus laingensis Meuffels & Grootaert, 1986
- Teuchophorus laosensis Olejníček, 2003
- Teuchophorus leigongshanus Wei & Yang, 2007
- Teuchophorus limosus Grootaert, 2006
- Teuchophorus litoralis Meuffels & Grootaert, 2004
- Teuchophorus longicauda (Grichanov, 2000)
- Teuchophorus longifrons Bickel, 1983
- Teuchophorus longipecten Meuffels & Grootaert, 2004
- Teuchophorus longisetosus Meuffels & Grootaert, 2004
- Teuchophorus mayanghenus Wei, Zhang & Yang, 2010
- Teuchophorus medovoensis Kechev, Negrobov & Grichanov, 2014
- Teuchophorus meieri Grootaert, 2006 (Note: Misspelled as "meiri" on Catalogue of Life.)
- Teuchophorus miles Meuffels & Grootaert, 2004
- Teuchophorus minor Meuffels & Grootaert, 2004
- Teuchophorus miricornis Meuffels & Grootaert, 2004
- Teuchophorus modestus Meuffels & Grootaert, 2004
- Teuchophorus monacanthus Loew, 1859
- Teuchophorus moniasus (Wei, 2006)
- Teuchophorus monochaetus Negrobov, Grichanov & Shamshev, 1984
- Teuchophorus neesoonensis Grootaert, 2006
- Teuchophorus nigrescus Yang & Saigusa, 1999
- Teuchophorus nigricosta (von Roser, 1840)
- Teuchophorus notabilis Meuffels & Grootaert, 2004
- Teuchophorus obliquus Meuffels & Grootaert, 2004
- Teuchophorus obscurus Meuffels & Grootaert, 2004
- Teuchophorus ornatuloides Meuffels & Grootaert, 2004
- Teuchophorus ornatulus Meuffels & Grootaert, 2004
- Teuchophorus pappi (Grichanov, 1996)
- Teuchophorus paradoxipus Stackelberg, 1931
- Teuchophorus parasirdenus Wei, Zhang & Yang, 2010
- Teuchophorus parcearmatus Meuffels & Grootaert, 1986
- Teuchophorus parmatus Meuffels & Grootaert, 2004
- Teuchophorus parvus Meuffels & Grootaert, 2004
- Teuchophorus pauper Meuffels & Grootaert, 2004
- Teuchophorus pectinatus Meuffels & Grootaert, 1986
- Teuchophorus peltastes Meuffels & Grootaert, 2004
- Teuchophorus phthorimosus Wei & Yang, 2007
- Teuchophorus pseudobipilosus Negrobov, Grichanov & Shamshev, 1984
- Teuchophorus pusio Meuffels & Grootaert, 1986
- Teuchophorus qianus Wei & Yang, 2007
- Teuchophorus quadratus Meuffels & Grootaert, 1986
- Teuchophorus quadrisetosus Naglis, 2009
- Teuchophorus queenslandicus Bickel, 1983
- Teuchophorus rifensis Nourti, Grichanov & Kettani, 2019
- Teuchophorus rohdendorfi Stackelberg, 1927
- Teuchophorus rozkosnyi Olejníček, 1981
- Teuchophorus samraouii Grootaert, Stark & Meuffels, 1995
- Teuchophorus simplex Mik, 1881
- Teuchophorus simplicipes De Meijere, 1916
- Teuchophorus simplicissimus Meuffels & Grootaert, 2004
- Teuchophorus sinensis Yang & Saigusa, 1999
- Teuchophorus singaporensis Grootaert, 2006
- Teuchophorus sirdenus Wei & Yang, 2007
- Teuchophorus spatulifer Meuffels & Grootaert, 1986
- Teuchophorus spinigerellus (Zetterstedt, 1843)
- Teuchophorus spinulosus Grootaert, 2006
- Teuchophorus stenostigma Meuffels & Grootaert, 2004
- Teuchophorus taiwanensis Wang, Yang & Grootaert, 2006
- Teuchophorus temasek Grootaert, 2006
- Teuchophorus tianmushanus Yang, 2001
- Teuchophorus tiomanensis Grootaert, 2006
- Teuchophorus trangensis (Bickel, 1999)
- Teuchophorus uncinatus Meuffels & Grootaert, 1986 (Note: Also duplicated as "unicinatus" on Catalogue of Life.)
- Teuchophorus ussurianus Negrobov, Grichanov & Shamshev, 1984
- Teuchophorus utahensis Harmston & Knowlton, 1942
- Teuchophorus vanaartseni Meuffels & Grootaert, 1986
- Teuchophorus ventralis Yang & Saigusa, 2000
- Teuchophorus vexillifer Meuffels & Grootaert, 2004
- Teuchophorus yingdensis Wang, Yang & Grootaert, 2006
- Teuchophorus yunnanensis Yang & Saigusa, 2001
- Teuchophorus zhuae Wang, 2006
- Teuchophorus zlobini (Grichanov, 1995)

The following species listed at Catalogue of Life are synonyms of others:

- Teuchophorus tenuimarginatus Becker, 1918: synonym of Telmaturgus simplicipes (Becker, 1908)
- Teuchophorus pectinulatus (Loew, 1864): synonym of Campsicnemus pumilio (Zetterstedt, 1843)
- Teuchophorus signatus (Zetterstedt, 1849): synonym of Teuchophorus nigricosta (von Roser, 1840)

The following species listed at Catalogue of Life are subspecies of others:

- Teuchophorus cupreoobscurus Santos Abreu, 1929: subspecies of Teuchophorus bipilosus Becker, 1908
