= Phrudoneura =

Scientific classification
- Kingdom: Animalia
- Phylum: Arthropoda
- Class: Insecta
- Order: Diptera
- Family: Dolichopodidae
- Subfamily: incertae sedis
- Genus: Phrudoneura; Meuffels & Grootaert, 1987

Type species
- Sympycnus (Phrudoneura) abbreviatus Meuffels & Grootaert, 1987

Genus of flies

Phrudoneura is a genus of flies in the family Dolichopodidae from the Australasian realm. It was originally created as a subgenus of Sympycnus. It is currently regarded as incertae sedis within the family by Daniel J. Bickel (2013), though is possibly close to Sympycninae.

== Species ==
- Phrudoneura abbreviata (Meuffels & Grootaert, 1987) – Papua New Guinea, Australia (NT, Qld), Solomon Islands
- Phrudoneura adusta Bickel, 2013 – New Caledonia
- Phrudoneura collessi Bickel, 2013 – Australia (WA, NSW, Qld)
- Phrudoneura hibernalis Bickel, 2013 – New Caledonia
- Phrudoneura maculata Meuffels & Grootaert, 2002 – New Caledonia
- Phrudoneura matilei Meuffels & Grootaert, 2002 – New Caledonia
- Phrudoneura obscura Meuffels & Grootaert, 2002 – New Caledonia
- Phrudoneura parva Meuffels & Grootaert, 2002 – New Caledonia
- Phrudoneura picta Meuffels & Grootaert, 2002 – New Caledonia
- Phrudoneura popondetta Bickel, 2013 – Papua New Guinea
