= Hercostomoides =

Scientific classification
- Kingdom: Animalia
- Phylum: Arthropoda
- Class: Insecta
- Order: Diptera
- Family: Dolichopodidae
- Subfamily: Sympycninae
- Genus: Hercostomoides; Meuffels & Grootaert, 1997

Type species
- Telmaturgus indonesianus Hollis, 1964

Genus of flies

Hercostomoides is a genus of flies in the family Dolichopodidae. It is known from Asia to Australia and the western Pacific Ocean.

== Species ==
The genus contains seven species:

- Hercostomoides baroalba Bickel, 2022 – Australia
- Hercostomoides bhartii Grichanov, 2017 – Indonesia (Highland Papua)
- Hercostomoides flavipleurus Bickel, 2022 – Australia
- Hercostomoides gagnei Bickel, 2022 – Australia
- Hercostomoides rufinus (Frey, 1925) (formerly Hercostomoides indonesianus (Hollis, 1964)) – Korea, Japan, China (Guangdong, Guangxi, Hainan, Zhejiang), Indonesia, India, Malaysia, Philippines, Singapore, Thailand, Vietnam, Australia
- Hercostomoides wauensis Bickel, 2022 – New Guinea
- Hercostomoides yapensis Bickel, 2022 – Yap Islands, Guam
