= Neoparentia =

Scientific classification
- Kingdom: Animalia
- Phylum: Arthropoda
- Class: Insecta
- Order: Diptera
- Family: Dolichopodidae
- Subfamily: Sympycninae
- Genus: Neoparentia; Robinson, 1967

Type species
- Neoparentia bisetosa Robinson, 1967

Genus of flies

Neoparentia is a genus of flies in the family Dolichopodidae.

== Species ==
- Neoparentia bicolor (Parent, 1954)
- Neoparentia bisetosa Robinson, 1967
- Neoparentia caudata (Van Duzee, 1917)
- Neoparentia deformis Robinson, 1967
- †Neoparentia chiapensis Bickel & Solórzano Kraemer, 2016
- Neoparentia obscura Robinson, 1967
- Neoparentia schildi Robinson, 1967
- Neoparentia tarsalis Robinson, 1967
