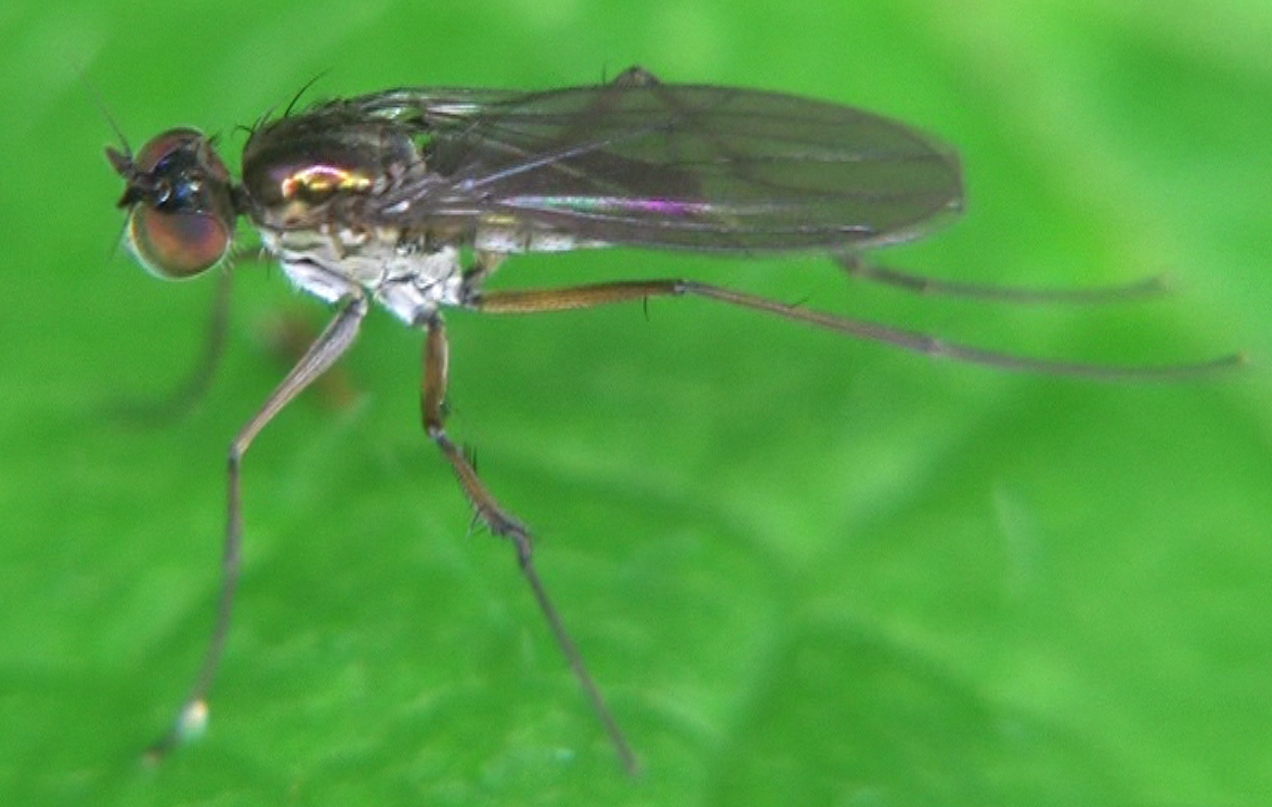
- Campsicnemus curvipes

Scientific classification
- Kingdom: Animalia
- Phylum: Arthropoda
- Clade: Pancrustacea
- Class: Insecta
- Order: Diptera
- Family: Dolichopodidae
- Subfamily: Sympycninae; Aldrich, 1905

Genera
- see text

Synonyms
- Campsicneminae Becker, 1917

= Sympycninae =

Subfamily of flies

Sympycninae is a subfamily of flies in the family Dolichopodidae. In some classifications, this subfamily includes the genera of the subfamilies Peloropeodinae and Xanthochlorinae.

== Genera ==
- Brevimyia Miller, 1945
- Calyxochaetus Bigot, 1888
- Campsicnemus Haliday in Walker, 1851
- Chaetogonopteron De Meijere, 1913
- Colobocerus Parent, 1933
- Erebomyia Runyon & Hurley, 2004
- Filatopus Robinson, 1970
- Hercostomoides Meuffels & Grootaert, 1997
- Humongochela Evenhuis, 2004
- Hyptiocheta Becker, 1922
- Irwinus Grichanov, 2023
- Ischiochaetus Bickel & Dyte, 1989
- Lamprochromus Mik, 1878
- Liparomyia White, 1916
- Micropygus Bickel & Dyte, 1989
- Negrobovus Wang, Evenhuis, Ji, Yang & Zhang, 2021
- Neoparentia Robinson, 1967
- Nothorhaphium Bickel, 1999
- Nurteria Dyte & Smith, 1980
- Olegonegrobovia Grichanov, 1995 (possible synonym of Teuchophorus?)
- Parasyntormon Wheeler, 1899
- Phrudoneura Meuffels & Grootaert, 1987 (incertae sedis)
- Pinacocerus Van Duzee, 1930
- Scelloides Bickel & Dyte, 1989
- Scotiomyia Meuffels & Grootaert, 1997
- Suschania Negrobov, 2003
- Sympycnus Loew, 1857
- Syntormon Loew, 1857
- Telmaturgus Mik, 1874
- Tetrachaetus Bickel & Dyte, 1989
- Teuchophorus Loew, 1857
- Yumbera Bickel, 1992
