= Cheiromyia =

Scientific classification
- Kingdom: Animalia
- Phylum: Arthropoda
- Class: Insecta
- Order: Diptera
- Family: Dolichopodidae
- Subfamily: Dolichopodinae
- Genus: Cheiromyia; Dyte, 1980

Type species
- Cheirocerus palmaticornis Parent, 1930

Synonyms
- Cheirocerus Parent, 1930 (nec Eigenmann, 1917)

Genus of flies

Cheiromyia is a genus of flies in the family Dolichopodidae. It is found in the Neotropical realm. It was originally named Cheirocerus by Octave Parent in 1930, but was renamed to Cheiromyia by Peter Dyte in 1980 after it was found to be preoccupied by the catfish genus Cheirocerus (Eigenmann, 1917). The antennae of the males bear one or more elongate projections on an enlarged postpedicel, resembling antlers. Cheiromyia is closely related to some species of Paraclius.

== Species ==
- Cheiromyia bicornis Brooks in Brooks, Cumming & Pollet, 2010 – Brazil
- Cheiromyia brevitarsis Brooks in Brooks, Cumming & Pollet, 2010 – Colombia, Guyana, French Guiana, Brazil
- Cheiromyia carolina Limeira-de-Oliveira & Brooks, 2018 – Brazil
- Cheiromyia fuscipennis Pollet & Brooks, 2018 – French Guiana
- Cheiromyia laselva Brooks in Brooks, Cumming & Pollet, 2010 – Costa Rica
- Cheiromyia nordestina Limeira-de-Oliveira & Cumming, 2018 – Brazil
- Cheiromyia palmaticornis (Parent, 1930) – Ecuador, Brazil, Suriname, French Guiana
- Cheiromyia pennaticornus (Parent, 1931) – Bolivia, Brazil, French Guiana

Cheiromyia maculipennis (Van Duzee, 1934) was transferred to Paraclius in 2010.
