= Ischiochaetus =

Scientific classification
- Kingdom: Animalia
- Phylum: Arthropoda
- Clade: Pancrustacea
- Class: Insecta
- Order: Diptera
- Family: Dolichopodidae
- Subfamily: Sympycninae
- Genus: Ischiochaetus; Bickel & Dyte, 1989

Type species
- Ischiochaetus ornatipes Parent, 1933

Synonyms
- Ischiochaetus Parent, 1933 (unavailable)

Genus of flies

Ischiochaetus is a genus of flies in the family Dolichopodidae, found in New Zealand. The genus was originally named by Octave Parent in 1933. However, since the genus was not designated a type species, this name was unavailable until 1989, when Daniel J. Bickel and C. E. Dyte designated Ischiochaetus ornatipes as the type species.

== Species ==
- Ischiochaetus lenis Parent, 1933
- Ischiochaetus ornatipes Parent, 1933
- Ischiochaetus rotundicornis Parent, 1933
- Ischiochaetus spinosus Parent, 1933
