= Shamshevia =

Scientific classification
- Kingdom: Animalia
- Phylum: Arthropoda
- Class: Insecta
- Order: Diptera
- Family: Dolichopodidae
- Subfamily: Diaphorinae
- Genus: Shamshevia; Grichanov, 2012

Type species
- Shamshevia hoanibensis Grichanov, 2012

Synonyms
- Arabshamshevia Naglis, 2014

Genus of flies

Shamshevia is a genus of flies in the family Dolichopodidae. It has a disjunct distribution, occurring in both the western Old World and the Fiji islands, and lives in varied ecological habitats. The genus is named after the Russian dipterist Igor Shamshev.

== Species ==
Five species are included in the genus:

- Shamshevia ajbanensis (Naglis, 2014) – United Arab Emirates
- Shamshevia hannahae Bickel, 2023 – Fiji
- Shamshevia hoanibensis Grichanov, 2012 – Namibia
- Shamshevia negevensis (Grichanov, 2016) – Israel
- Shamshevia reshchikovi Grichanov, 2012 – India: Goa
