= Antyx =

Scientific classification
- Kingdom: Animalia
- Phylum: Arthropoda
- Clade: Pancrustacea
- Class: Insecta
- Order: Diptera
- Family: Dolichopodidae
- Subfamily: Antyxinae; Yang, Zhu, Wang & Zhang, 2006
- Genus: Antyx; Meuffels & Grootaert, 1991

Type species
- Antyx pallida Meuffels & Grootaert, 1991

Genus of flies

Antyx is a genus of flies in the family Dolichopodidae from the Australasian realm. The genus was originally placed in the subfamily Sympycninae, but it was later found to be closer to the Neurigoninae and was placed as incertae sedis within the family. In the World Catalog of Dolichopodidae (Insecta: Diptera) by Yang et al. (2006), the new subfamily Antyxinae was proposed, in which Antyx is the only genus. However, the validity of this new subfamily was later criticized by Sinclair et al. (2008). According to them, the subfamily's erection by Yang et al. (2006) was not justified by their phylogenetic analysis, and the genus would have been better placed as incertae sedis until a later phylogenetic study determines its placement.

== Species ==
The genus contains eight species, five from New Caledonia and three from Australia:

- Antyx edita Bickel, 1999 – Australia: Queensland
- Antyx fagina Bickel, 1999 – Australia: New South Wales
- Antyx flavipleuris Meuffels & Grootaert, 1991 – New Caledonia
- Antyx fuscirostris Meuffels & Grootaert, 1991 – New Caledonia
- Antyx matilei Meuffels & Grootaert, 1991 – New Caledonia
- Antyx pallida Meuffels & Grootaert, 1991 – New Caledonia
- Antyx pallidiventris Meuffels & Grootaert, 1991 – New Caledonia
- Antyx werrikimbe Bickel, 1999 – Australia: New South Wales
