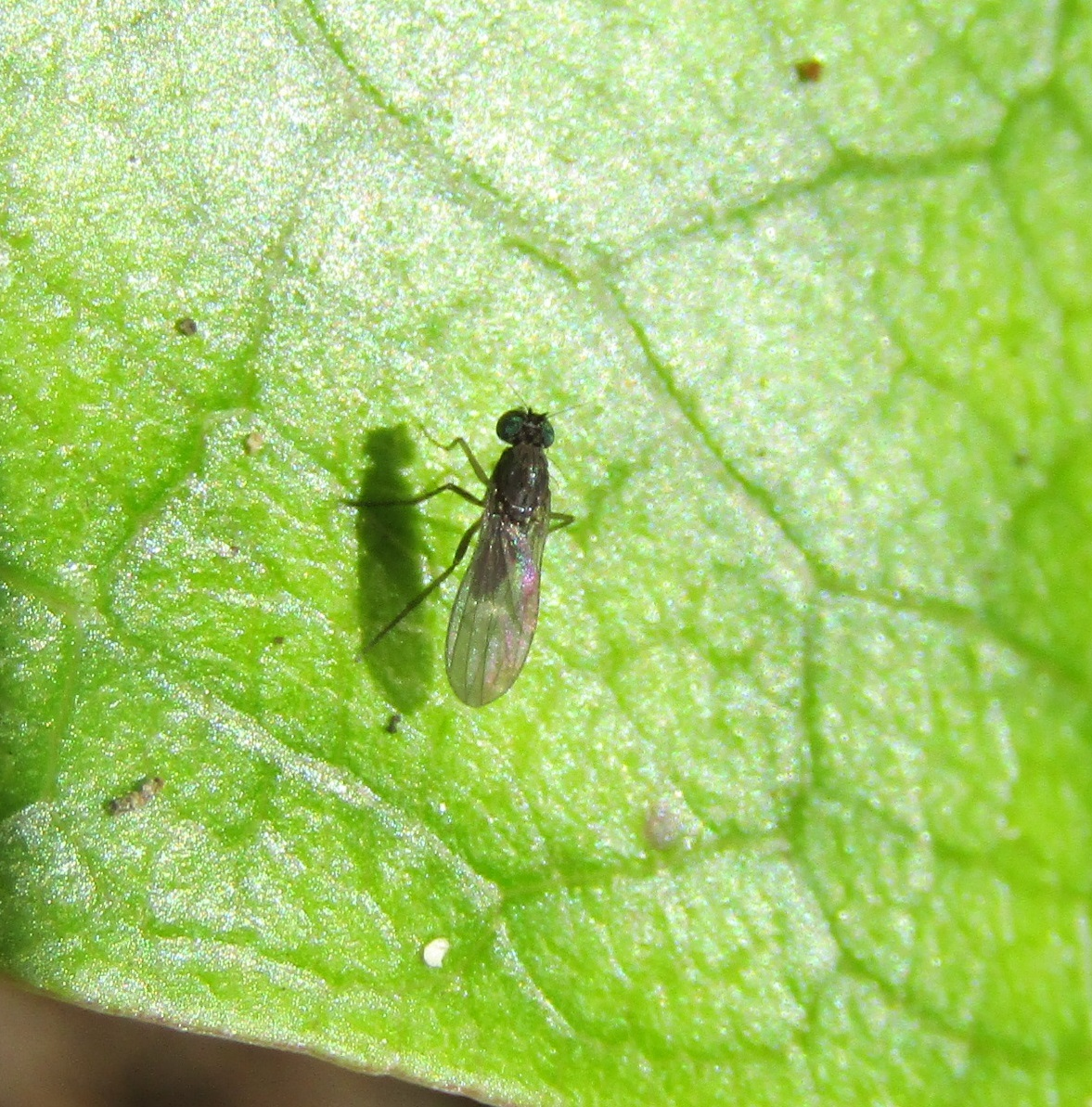
- Micropygus bipunctatus

Scientific classification
- Kingdom: Animalia
- Phylum: Arthropoda
- Class: Insecta
- Order: Diptera
- Family: Dolichopodidae
- Subfamily: Sympycninae
- Genus: Micropygus; Bickel & Dyte, 1989

Type species
- Micropygus bifenestratus Parent, 1933

Synonyms
- Micropygus Parent, 1933 (unavailable)

= Micropygus =

Genus of flies

Micropygus is a genus of flies in the family Dolichopodidae. It is native to New Zealand, though the species Micropygus vagans is also found in the British Isles as an introduced species. The genus was originally named by Octave Parent in 1933. However, as the genus was not designated a type species, this name was unavailable until 1989, when Daniel J. Bickel and C. E. Dyte designated Micropygus bifenestratus as the type species.

== Species ==
There are 16 species included in the genus:

- Micropygus bifenestratus Parent, 1933
- Micropygus bipunctatus Parent, 1933
- Micropygus brevicornis Parent, 1933
- Micropygus brevithorax Parent, 1933
- Micropygus divergens Parent, 1933
- Micropygus inornatus Parent, 1933
- Micropygus lacustris Parent, 1933
- Micropygus nigripes Parent, 1933
- Micropygus puerulus Parent, 1933
- Micropygus pulchellus Parent, 1933
- Micropygus ripicola Parent, 1933
- Micropygus serratus Parent, 1933
- Micropygus striatus Parent, 1933
- Micropygus tarsatus Parent, 1933
- Micropygus transiens Parent, 1933
- Micropygus vagans Parent, 1933
