= Pseudoxanthochlorus =

Scientific classification
- Kingdom: Animalia
- Phylum: Arthropoda
- Class: Insecta
- Order: Diptera
- Family: Dolichopodidae
- Subfamily: Peloropeodinae
- Genus: Pseudoxanthochlorus; Negrobov, 1977
- Species: P. micropygus

Binomial name
- Pseudoxanthochlorus micropygus Negrobov, 1977

Genus of flies

Pseudoxanthochlorus is a genus of flies in the family Dolichopodidae. The genus contains only one species, Pseudoxanthochlorus micropygus, known from Yakovlevka, Primorsky Krai in Russia.
