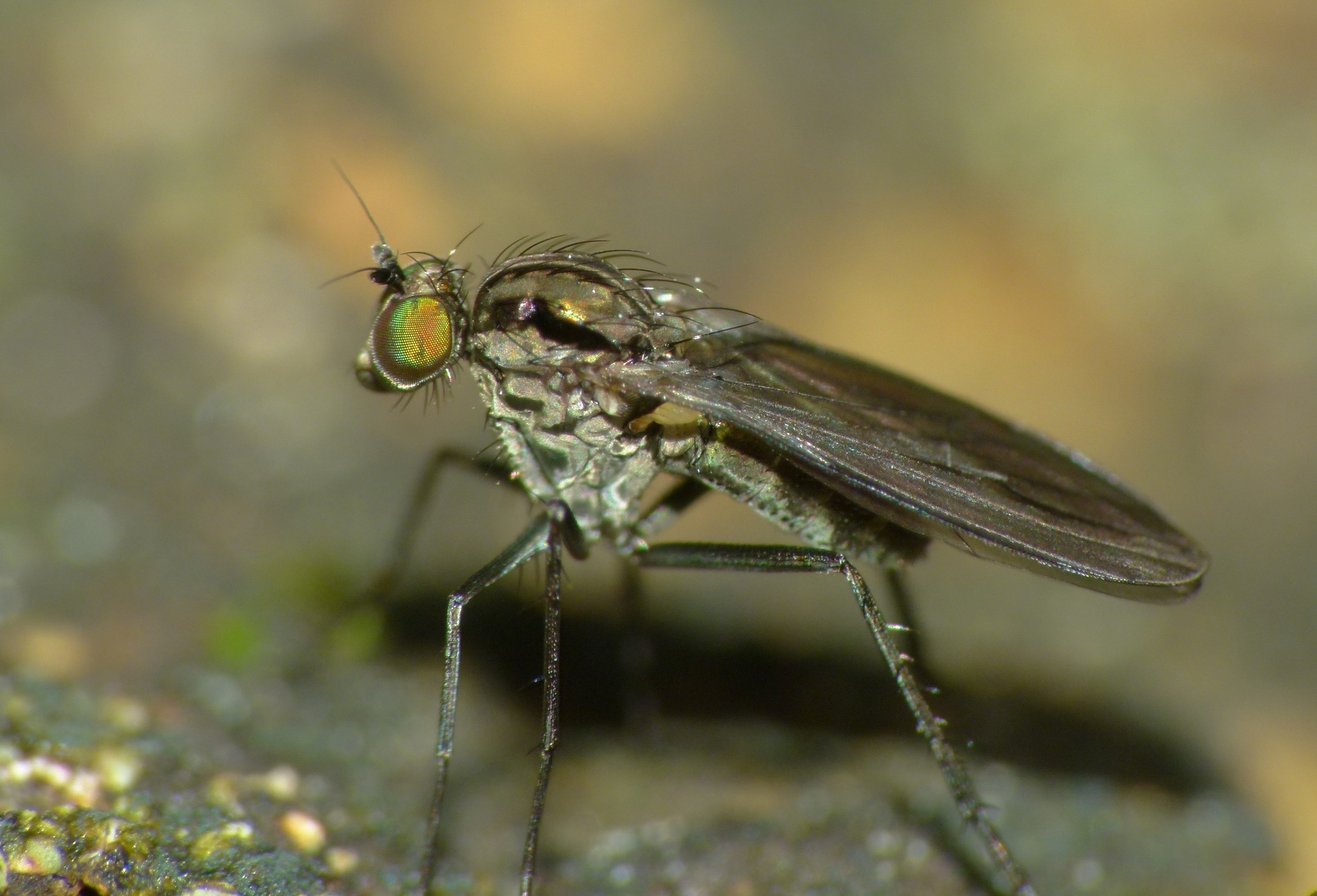
- Scelloides ornatipes

Scientific classification
- Kingdom: Animalia
- Phylum: Arthropoda
- Class: Insecta
- Order: Diptera
- Family: Dolichopodidae
- Subfamily: Sympycninae
- Genus: Scelloides; Bickel & Dyte, 1989

Type species
- Scelloides ornatipes Parent, 1933

Synonyms
- Scelloides Parent, 1933 (unavailable)

= Scelloides =

Genus of flies

Scelloides is a genus of flies in the family Dolichopodidae, found in New Zealand. The genus was originally named by Octave Parent in 1933. However, as the genus was not designated a type species, this name was unavailable until 1989, when Daniel J. Bickel and C. E. Dyte designated Scelloides ornatipes as the type species.

== Species ==
- Scelloides armatus Parent, 1933
- Scelloides brunneifrons Parent, 1933
- Scelloides conspicuus Parent, 1933
- Scelloides fulvifrons Parent, 1933
- Scelloides maculatus Parent, 1933
- Scelloides ornatipes Parent, 1933
- Scelloides parcespinosus Parent, 1933
- Scelloides parvus Parent, 1933
- Scelloides pollinosus Parent, 1933
- Scelloides raptorius Parent, 1933
- Scelloides spinosus Parent, 1933
- Scelloides vicinus Parent, 1933
