= Nothorhaphium =

Scientific classification
- Kingdom: Animalia
- Phylum: Arthropoda
- Clade: Pancrustacea
- Class: Insecta
- Order: Diptera
- Family: Dolichopodidae
- Subfamily: Sympycninae
- Genus: Nothorhaphium; Bickel, 1999

Type species
- Syntormon aemulans Becker, 1922

Genus of flies

Nothorhaphium is a genus of flies belonging to the family Dolichopodidae. It includes four species from Australia and a single species from New Guinea. Nothorhaphium superficially resembles the genus Rhaphium, but it belongs in the subfamily Sympycninae and is thought to be closely related to the genera Syntormon and Parasyntormon. The name of the genus is derived from the Greek νόθος (nóthos, "false"), and Rhaphium.

== Species ==
- Nothorhaphium aemulans (Becker, 1922) – widespread in Australia, Norfolk Island
- Nothorhaphium callosum Bickel, 1999 – West Australia, Victoria
- Nothorhaphium curalo Bickel, 1999 – New South Wales, Victoria, Tasmania
- Nothorhaphium nudicorne Bickel, 1999 – Tasmania, South Australia, West Australia
- Nothorhaphium oro Bickel, 1999 – Papua New Guinea
