= Yumbera =

Scientific classification
- Kingdom: Animalia
- Phylum: Arthropoda
- Clade: Pancrustacea
- Class: Insecta
- Order: Diptera
- Family: Dolichopodidae
- Subfamily: Sympycninae
- Genus: Yumbera; Bickel, 1992

Type species
- Sympycnus callidus Parent, 1932

Genus of flies

Yumbera is a genus of flies in the family Dolichopodidae, known from eastern mainland Australia and Tasmania. The generic name is an Australian aboriginal word meaning "fly".

== Species ==
- Yumbera athertonia Bickel, 1992 – Queensland
- Yumbera callida (Parent, 1932) – New South Wales; Queensland
- Yumbera conica Bickel, 1992 – New South Wales; Queensland
- Yumbera nudicornis Bickel, 1992 – Queensland
- Yumbera signata Bickel, 1992 – New South Wales; Queensland; Victoria
- Yumbera trisignata Bickel, 2012 – Tasmania
