= Rhynchoschizus =

Scientific classification
- Kingdom: Animalia
- Phylum: Arthropoda
- Clade: Pancrustacea
- Class: Insecta
- Order: Diptera
- Family: Dolichopodidae
- Subfamily: Hydrophorinae
- Tribe: Hydrophorini
- Genus: Rhynchoschizus; Dyte, 1980
- Species: R. imbellis

Binomial name
- Rhynchoschizus imbellis (Parent, 1927)

Synonyms
- Genus: Schizorhynchus Parent, 1927 (nec Hallez, 1894); Rhinchoschizus (misspelling); Species: Schizorhynchus imbellis Parent, 1927

Genus of flies

Rhynchoschizus is a genus of flies in the family Dolichopodidae. It contains only one species, Rhynchoschizus imbellis, and it is found in Albania. It was originally named Schizorhynchus by Octave Parent in 1927, but was renamed to Rhynchoschizus by C. E. Dyte in 1980 after it was found to be preoccupied by the flatworm genus Schizorhynchus (Hallez, 1894).
