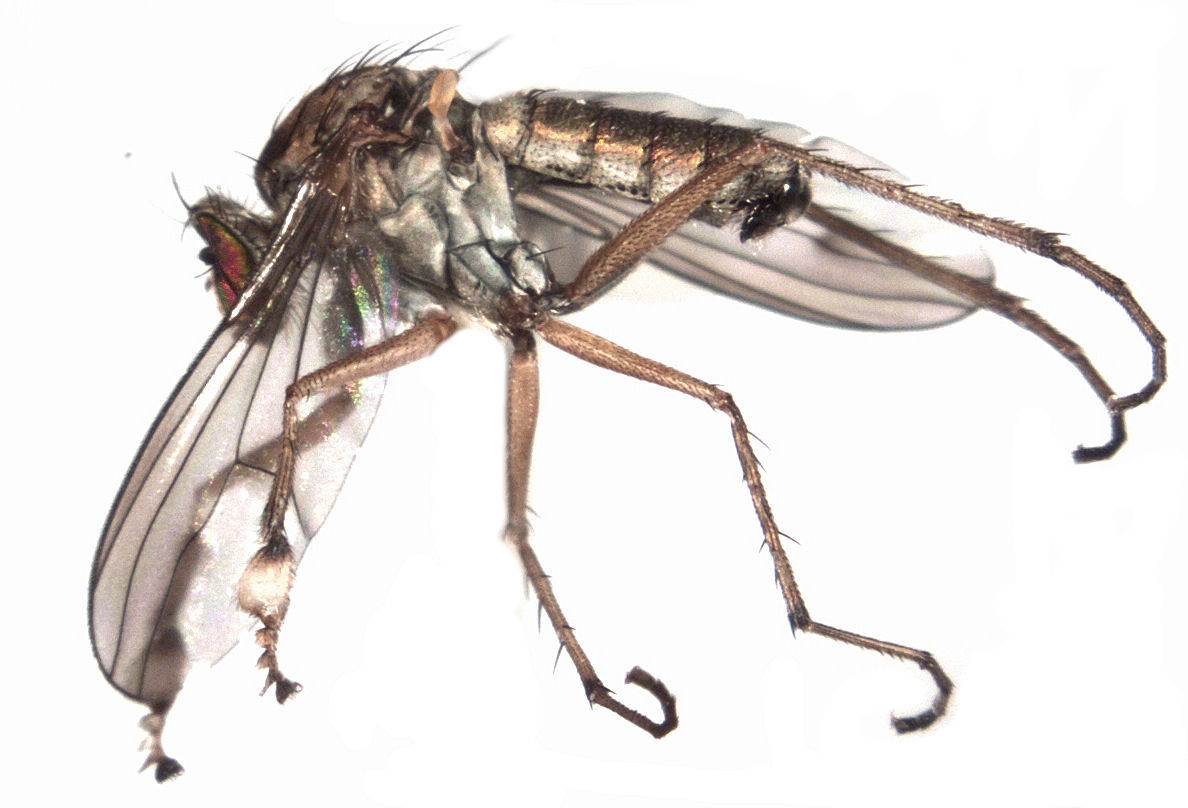
- Male Helichochaetus discifer

Scientific classification
- Kingdom: Animalia
- Phylum: Arthropoda
- Clade: Pancrustacea
- Class: Insecta
- Order: Diptera
- Family: Dolichopodidae
- Subfamily: Hydrophorinae
- Tribe: Hydrophorini
- Genus: Helichochaetus; Parent, 1933
- Species: H. discifer

Binomial name
- Helichochaetus discifer Parent, 1933

= Helichochaetus =

Genus of flies

Helichochaetus is a genus of flies in the family Dolichopodidae. It contains only one species, Helichochaetus discifer, and is found in New Zealand.
