= Suschania =

Scientific classification
- Kingdom: Animalia
- Phylum: Arthropoda
- Class: Insecta
- Order: Diptera
- Family: Dolichopodidae
- Subfamily: Sympycninae
- Genus: Suschania; Negrobov, 2003
- Species: S. stackelbergi

Binomial name
- Suschania stackelbergi Negrobov, 2003

Genus of flies

Suschania is a genus of flies belonging to the family Dolichopodidae. It contains one species, Suschania stackelbergi, described from Primorsky Krai in the Russian Far East.
