= Septocellula =

Septocellula Temporal range: Eocene, 55.8–48.6 Ma

Scientific classification
- Kingdom: Animalia
- Phylum: Arthropoda
- Class: Insecta
- Order: Diptera
- Family: Dolichopodidae
- Subfamily: †Eodolichopoditinae
- Genus: †Septocellula; Hong, 1981
- Species: †S. asiatica

Binomial name
- †Septocellula asiatica Hong, 1981

Extinct genus of flies

Septocellula is an extinct genus of fly in the family Dolichopodidae. It contains only one species, Septocellula asiatica, described from Eocene amber found near Fushun, China.

The genus Septocellula was first described in 1981 by Hong Youchong, who assigned to it three species: Septocellula asiatica, Septocellula fera and Septocellula trichopoda. In 2002, the latter two species were transferred by Hong to their own genera – Orbilabia and Wangia (later renamed Fushuniregis), respectively.
