= Sigmatineurum =

Scientific classification
- Kingdom: Animalia
- Phylum: Arthropoda
- Class: Insecta
- Order: Diptera
- Family: Dolichopodidae
- Subfamily: incertae sedis
- Genus: Sigmatineurum; Parent, 1938

Type species
- Sigmatineurum chalybeum Parent, 1938

Genus of flies

Sigmatineurum is a genus of fly in the family Dolichopodidae. It is endemic to Hawaii, occurring on all the main islands in the archipelago. It is part of the Eurynogaster complex of genera.

== Species ==
- Sigmatineurum binodatum (Parent, 1939)
- Sigmatineurum chalybeum Parent, 1938
- Sigmatineurum englundi Evenhuis, 2000
- Sigmatineurum iao Evenhuis, 1994
- Sigmatineurum meaohi Evenhuis, 1997
- Sigmatineurum mnemogagne Evenhuis, 1994
- Sigmatineurum napali Evenhuis, 1994
- Sigmatineurum nigrum Evenhuis, 1997
- Sigmatineurum omega Evenhuis, 1994
- Sigmatineurum parenti Evenhuis, 1997
- Sigmatineurum puleloai Englund & Evenhuis, 2005
