= Babindella =

Scientific classification
- Kingdom: Animalia
- Phylum: Arthropoda
- Clade: Pancrustacea
- Class: Insecta
- Order: Diptera
- Family: Dolichopodidae
- Subfamily: Babindellinae; Bickel, 1987
- Genus: Babindella; Bickel, 1987

Type species
- Babindella physoura Bickel, 1987

Genus of flies

Babindella is a genus of flies in the family Dolichopodidae from Australia. It is the only genus in the subfamily Babindellinae.

== Discovery and research ==
Specimens of Babindella were first discovered within the Australian National Insect Collection in Canberra and the Australian Museum in Sydney. They were recognised as unusual because of the inflated and symmetrical male postabdomen (the terminal segments of the abdomen containing the anal and genital segments) with the seventh and eighth abdominal segments fused, unlike all other dolichopodids known at the time which had an asymmetrical postabdomen with unfused seventh and eighth abdominal segments. This distinctive postabdomen led Daniel J. Bickel in 1987 to describe a new genus, Babindella, and place it within its own subfamily, Babindellinae. The genus was named after Babinda, the type locality of the type species, B. physoura.

According to Grichanov (2018), Babindella belongs to a group of genera mainly in the subfamily Medeterinae with a symmetrical or nearly symmetrical postabdomen, such as Udzungwomyia, and there may be no basis for a separate subfamily for Babindella, though molecular data is needed to confirm if Babindellinae should be included in Medeterinae or if the latter subfamily should be split up.

== Description ==
Adults of Babindella are tiny yellowish flies, about 1 millimetre (0.039 in) long.

== Species ==
The genus contains two species:

- Babindella physoura Bickel, 1987 – Queensland (Babinda Boulders and Mossman Gorge)
- Babindella whianensis Bickel, 1987 – New South Wales (Whian Whian State Forest)

== Habitat ==
Both species of Babindella were collected from tropical or subtropical closed forests.
