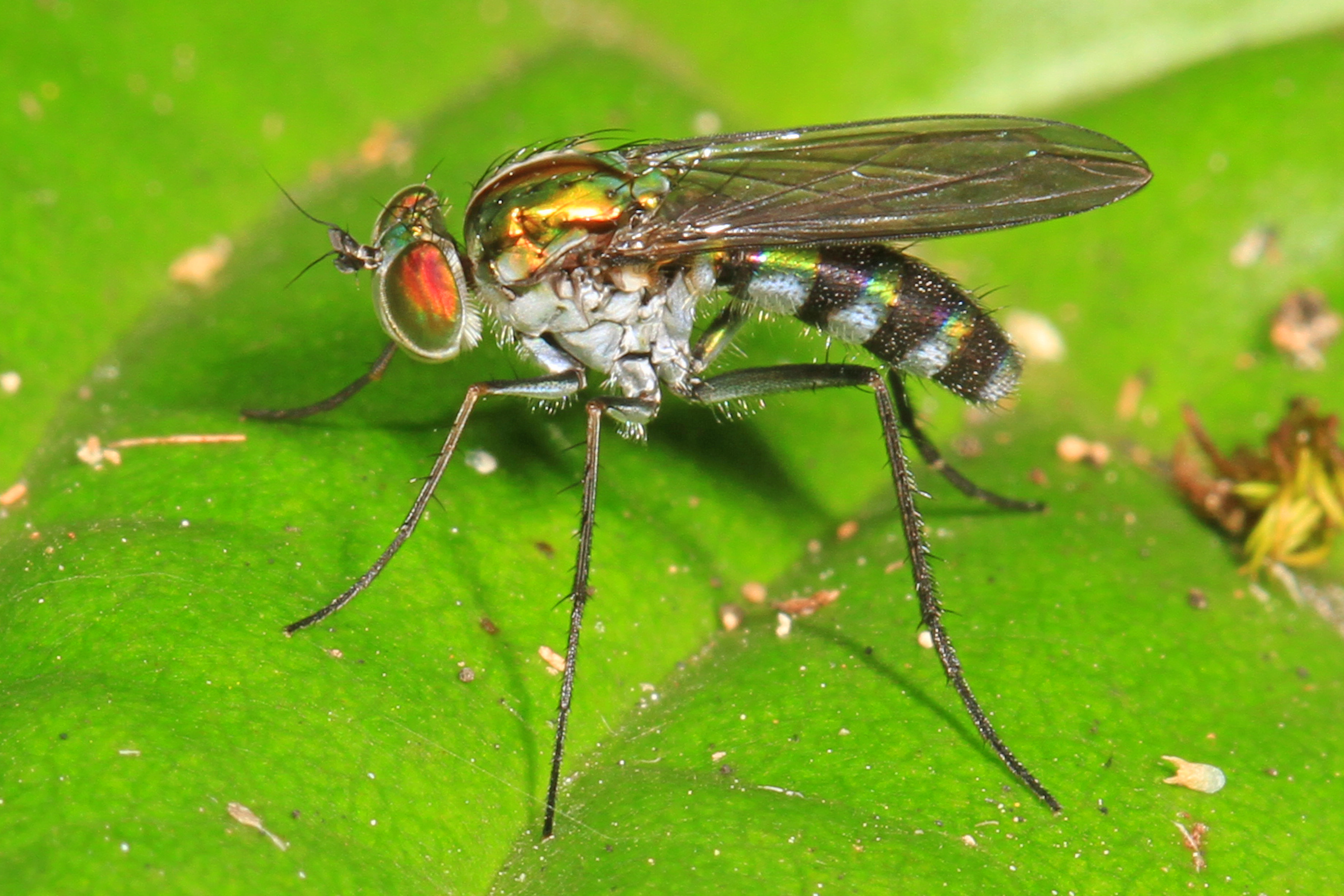

Scientific classification
- Kingdom: Animalia
- Phylum: Arthropoda
- Class: Insecta
- Order: Diptera
- Family: Dolichopodidae
- Subfamily: Plagioneurinae; Aldrich, 1905
- Genus: Plagioneurus; Loew, 1857
- Species: P. univittatus

Binomial name
- Plagioneurus univittatus Loew, 1857

= Plagioneurus =

Genus of flies

Plagioneurus is a genus of long-legged flies in the family Dolichopodidae. It contains only one species, Plagioneurus univittatus, and is the only member of the subfamily Plagioneurinae. The range of P. univittatus spans from the Eastern United States south to South America.

The genus name is derived from the Ancient Greek words πλάγιος (plágios, 'oblique') and νεῦρον (neûron, 'nerve'), referring to the unusual angle of the last part of the medial wing vein M, which converges with radial vein R_{4+5}.

In the adults, the thorax is a metallic green, with a strong black stripe in the center, and the abdomen is black with white pruinose posterior bands. The wings are hyaline.

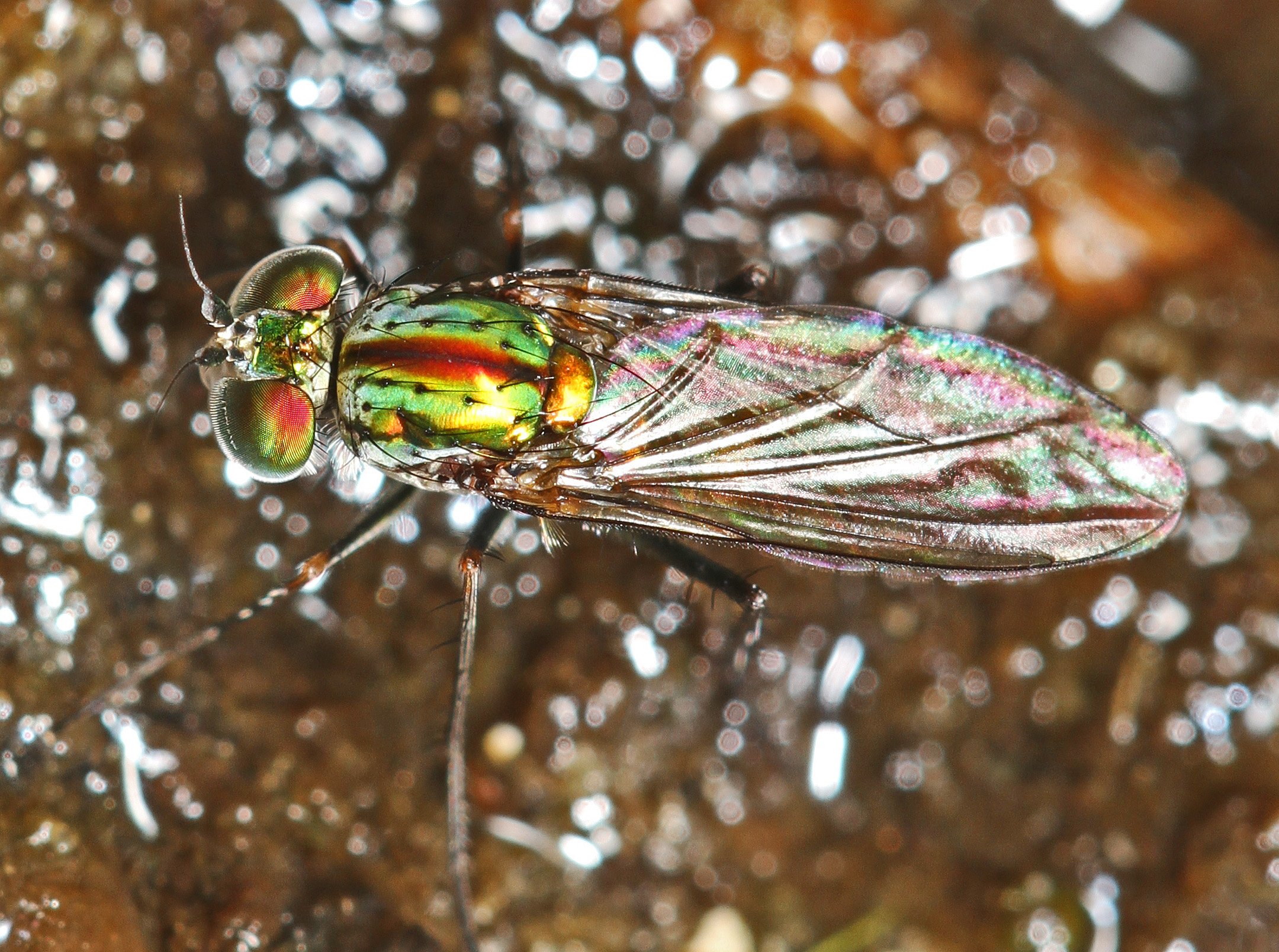
