= Prosystenus =

Prosystenus Temporal range: Middle Eocene

Scientific classification
- Kingdom: Animalia
- Phylum: Arthropoda
- Class: Insecta
- Order: Diptera
- Family: Dolichopodidae
- Genus: †Prosystenus; Negrobov, 1976
- Species: †P. zherichini

Binomial name
- †Prosystenus zherichini Negrobov, 1976

Extinct genus of flies

Prosystenus is an extinct genus of flies in the family Dolichopodidae, from the Middle Eocene of Sakhalin Island in the Russian Far East. It contains only one species, Prosystenus zherichini, described from Sakhalin amber. It is the oldest confirmed representative of the Dolichopodidae in its strict sense, excluding the subfamilies Microphorinae and Parathalassiinae.
