= Pinacocerus =

Scientific classification
- Kingdom: Animalia
- Phylum: Arthropoda
- Class: Insecta
- Order: Diptera
- Family: Dolichopodidae
- Subfamily: Sympycninae
- Genus: Pinacocerus; Van Duzee, 1930

Type species
- Pinacocerus nodicornis Van Duzee, 1930

Genus of flies

Pinacocerus is a genus of flies in the family Dolichopodidae, known from Chile and Argentina.

== Species ==
- Pinacocerus candiptorum Bickel, 2012 – Chile
- Pinacocerus nodicornis Van Duzee, 1930 – Argentina; Chile
