= Hyptiocheta =

Scientific classification
- Kingdom: Animalia
- Phylum: Arthropoda
- Clade: Pancrustacea
- Class: Insecta
- Order: Diptera
- Family: Dolichopodidae
- Subfamily: Sympycninae
- Genus: Hyptiocheta; Becker, 1922
- Species: H. convexa

Binomial name
- Hyptiocheta convexa Becker, 1922

Genus of flies

Hyptiocheta is a genus of flies in the family Dolichopodidae, known from Peru. It contains only one species, Hyptiocheta convexa.
