= Scotiomyia =

Scientific classification
- Kingdom: Animalia
- Phylum: Arthropoda
- Class: Insecta
- Order: Diptera
- Family: Dolichopodidae
- Subfamily: Sympycninae
- Genus: Scotiomyia; Meuffels & Grootaert, 1997

Type species
- Scotiomyia fusca Meuffels & Grootaert, 1997

Synonyms
- Paluda Wei, 2006 (nec DeLong, 1937)

Genus of flies

Scotiomyia is a genus of flies in the family Dolichopodidae. It is distributed in Papua New Guinea, Singapore and China.

== Species ==
- Scotiomyia flavicauda Wei & Yang, 2007 – China
- Scotiomyia fusca Meuffels & Grootaert, 1997 – Papua New Guinea
- Scotiomyia melanura Meuffels & Grootaert, 1997 – Papua New Guinea
- Scotiomyia opercula (Wei, 2006) – China
- Scotiomyia singaporensis Evenhuis & Grootaert, 2002 – Singapore
