= Humongochela =

Scientific classification
- Kingdom: Animalia
- Phylum: Arthropoda
- Class: Insecta
- Order: Diptera
- Family: Dolichopodidae
- Subfamily: Sympycninae
- Genus: Humongochela; Evenhuis, 2004

Type species
- Humongochela hardyi Evenhuis, 2004

Genus of flies

Humongochela is a genus of flies in the family Dolichopodidae. It is known from three of the Marquesas Islands, with one species on each. All three species are found on vertical surfaces near waterfalls. Flies in the genus have extremely long tarsal claws as well as extremely reduced pulvilli. These are presumed to be evolutionary adaptions to allow better grip on the slippery substrata near waterfalls. The generic name is derived from the American slang "humongous" (meaning large, monstrous) and the Latin chela ("claw"), referring to their extremely long claws.

== Species ==
- Humongochela englundi Evenhuis, 2004 – Fatu-Hiva
- Humongochela hardyi Evenhuis, 2004 – Nuku Hiva
- Humongochela polhemusi Evenhuis, 2004 – Hiva Oa
