= Negrobovia =

Scientific classification
- Kingdom: Animalia
- Phylum: Arthropoda
- Clade: Pancrustacea
- Class: Insecta
- Order: Diptera
- Family: Dolichopodidae
- Subfamily: Sciapodinae
- Tribe: Mesorhagini
- Genus: Negrobovia; Bickel, 1994

Type species
- Psilopus australensis Schiner, 1868

Genus of flies

Negrobovia is a genus of flies in the family Dolichopodidae found in Australia. It is named in honor of O.P. Negrobov.

== Species ==
The genus contains three species:

- Negrobovia aculicita Bickel, 1994
- Negrobovia australensis (Schiner, 1868)
- Negrobovia flavihalteralis Bickel, 1994
