= Chaetogonopteron =

Scientific classification
- Kingdom: Animalia
- Phylum: Arthropoda
- Clade: Pancrustacea
- Class: Insecta
- Order: Diptera
- Family: Dolichopodidae
- Subfamily: Sympycninae
- Genus: Chaetogonopteron; De Meijere, 1914

Type species
- Chaetogonopteron appendiculatum De Meijere, 1914

Synonyms
- Pycsymnus Frey, 1925; Hoplignusus Vaillant, 1953

Genus of flies

Chaetogonopteron is a genus of flies in the family Dolichopodidae.

== Species ==
- Chaetogonopteron acuticorne (Frey, 1928)
- Chaetogonopteron aechmophorum (Meuffels & Grootaert, 1987)
- Chaetogonopteron albifimbriatum (Parent, 1932)
- Chaetogonopteron albiserratum (Meuffels & Grootaert, 1987)
- Chaetogonopteron aldabricum Meuffels & Grootaert, 2009
- Chaetogonopteron alipes (Meuffels & Grootaert, 1987)
- Chaetogonopteron anacrostichum (Meuffels & Grootaert, 1987)
- Chaetogonopteron anae Wang, Yang & Grootaert, 2005
- Chaetogonopteron apicale (De Meijere, 1916)
- Chaetogonopteron appendicitum (Parent, 1932)
- Chaetogonopteron appendiculatum De Meijere, 1914
- Chaetogonopteron araneipes (Meuffels & Grootaert, 1987)
- Chaetogonopteron argentipes (De Meijere, 1916)
- Chaetogonopteron argyropus (Parent, 1932)
- Chaetogonopteron arunense (Hollis, 1964)
- Chaetogonopteron bartaki Olejníček & Kubík, 2007
- Chaetogonopteron basipunctatum Yang, 2002
- †Chaetogonopteron bethnorrisae Bickel, 2009
- Chaetogonopteron bisulcum (Becker, 1922)
- Chaetogonopteron campsicnemoides (Meuffels & Grootaert, 1987)
- Chaetogonopteron candidimanum (Meuffels & Grootaert, 1987)
- Chaetogonopteron capricorne Bickel, 2013
- Chaetogonopteron ceratophorum Yang & Grootaert, 1999
- Chaetogonopteron chaeturum Grootaert & Meuffels, 1999
- Chaetogonopteron cheesmanae Hollis, 1963
- Chaetogonopteron coei (Hollis, 1964)
- Chaetogonopteron collectum (Walker, 1857)
- Chaetogonopteron compressipes (Meuffels & Grootaert, 1987)
- Chaetogonopteron ctenophorum (Meuffels & Grootaert, 1987)
- Chaetogonopteron daweishanum Yang & Saigusa, 2001
- Chaetogonopteron dayaoshanum Liao, Zhou & Yang, 2008
- Chaetogonopteron fimbritibia Hollis, 1963
- Chaetogonopteron flavmarginatum Yang, 2002
- Chaetogonopteron gigas (Meuffels & Grootaert, 1987)
- Chaetogonopteron glaucum (Becker, 1924)
- Chaetogonopteron gloriosum (Frey, 1925)
- Chaetogonopteron guangdongense Zhang, Yang & Grootaert, 2003
- Chaetogonopteron guangxiense Zhang, Yang & Masunaga, 2004
- Chaetogonopteron guizhouense Yang & Saigusa, 2001
- Chaetogonopteron gummigutti (Becker, 1922)
- Chaetogonopteron hainanum Yang, 2002
- Chaetogonopteron hungshuichiense Wang, Yang & Masunaga, 2009
- Chaetogonopteron ictericum (Meuffels & Grootaert, 1987)
- Chaetogonopteron incomptum (Meuffels & Grootaert, 1987)
- Chaetogonopteron intermittens (Becker, 1924)
- Chaetogonopteron kaohsungense Wang, Yang & Masunaga, 2009
- Chaetogonopteron laetum (Becker, 1922)
- Chaetogonopteron leucotarsum (Meuffels & Grootaert, 1987)
- Chaetogonopteron liui Wang, Yang & Grootaert, 2005
- Chaetogonopteron longicercus Liao, Zhou & Yang, 2008
- Chaetogonopteron longum Yang & Saigusa, 2001
- Chaetogonopteron luteoviride (Parent, 1932)
- Chaetogonopteron maculatum (Parent, 1932)
- Chaetogonopteron magnificum (Parent, 1935)
- Chaetogonopteron majus (De Meijere, 1916)
- Chaetogonopteron menglonganum Yang & Grootaert, 1999
- Chaetogonopteron menglunense Yang & Grootaert, 1999
- Chaetogonopteron metallescens (De Meijere, 1916)
- Chaetogonopteron microclidium Bickel, 2016
- Chaetogonopteron millenarium Bickel, 2016
- Chaetogonopteron minutulum (Parent, 1932)
- Chaetogonopteron minutum Yang & Grootaert, 1999
- Chaetogonopteron miritarse (Meuffels & Grootaert, 1987)
- Chaetogonopteron mogiai Bickel, 2016
- Chaetogonopteron mutatum (Parent, 1932)
- Chaetogonopteron nanlingense Zhang, Yang & Grootaert, 2003
- Chaetogonopteron nectarophagum (Curran, 1924)
- Chaetogonopteron nepalense (Hollis, 1964)
- Chaetogonopteron nigrisquame (Meuffels & Grootaert, 1987)
- Chaetogonopteron nodicorne (Becker, 1922)
- Chaetogonopteron obscuratum (Becker, 1924)
- Chaetogonopteron oreibatum Bickel, 2016
- Chaetogonopteron pallantennatum Yang & Grootaert, 1999
- Chaetogonopteron pallipes (Meuffels & Grootaert, 1987)
- Chaetogonopteron pallipilosum Yang & Grootaert, 1999
- Chaetogonopteron plumipes (Parent, 1939)
- Chaetogonopteron plumitarse (De Meijere, 1916)
- Chaetogonopteron priapus (Meuffels & Grootaert, 1987)
- Chaetogonopteron prospicuum (Becker, 1922)
- Chaetogonopteron ripicola (Meuffels & Grootaert, 1987)
- Chaetogonopteron rutilum (Becker, 1922)
- Chaetogonopteron seriatum Yang & Grootaert, 1999
- Chaetogonopteron setigerum (Becker, 1922)
- Chaetogonopteron shettyi Olejníček, 2002
- †Chaetogonopteron sobrium (Meunier, 1910)
- Chaetogonopteron sticticum (Meuffels & Grootaert, 1987)
- Chaetogonopteron strenuum (Becker, 1922)
- Chaetogonopteron sublaetum Yang & Grootaert, 1999
- Chaetogonopteron taiwanense Wang, Yang & Masunaga, 2009
- Chaetogonopteron tanypteron Bickel, 2016
- Chaetogonopteron tarsale De Meijere, 1916
- Chaetogonopteron tarsatum (Schiner, 1868)
- Chaetogonopteron tenerum (Becker, 1922)
- Chaetogonopteron teuchophoroides (Meuffels & Grootaert, 1987)
- Chaetogonopteron thienemanni (Stackelberg, 1931)
- Chaetogonopteron tokoi Bickel, 2016
- Chaetogonopteron torrenticola (Meuffels & Grootaert, 1987)
- Chaetogonopteron tricornigerum (Meuffels & Grootaert, 1987)
- Chaetogonopteron vagum (Becker, 1922)
- Chaetogonopteron ventrale Yang & Saigusa, 2001
- Chaetogonopteron ventriseta Liao, Zhou & Yang, 2008
- Chaetogonopteron vexillum Bickel, 2013
- Chaetogonopteron vermiculatum (Parent, 1932)
- Chaetogonopteron wuhuaense Wang, Yang & Grootaert, 2005
- Chaetogonopteron zhangae Wang, Yang & Grootaert, 2005
- Chaetogonopteron zhuae Liao, Zhou & Yang, 2008
