= Haplopharyngomyia =

Scientific classification
- Kingdom: Animalia
- Phylum: Arthropoda
- Class: Insecta
- Order: Diptera
- Family: Dolichopodidae
- Subfamily: incertae sedis
- Genus: Haplopharyngomyia; Meuffels & Grootaert, 1999

Type species
- Haplopharynx mutilus Grootaert & Meuffels, 1998

Synonyms
- Haplopharynx Grootaert & Meuffels, 1998 (nec Meixner, 1938)

Genus of flies

Haplopharyngomyia is a genus of flies in the family Dolichopodidae. It is known from Thailand.

It was originally named Haplopharynx by H.J.G. Grootaert and Patrick Meuffels in 1998. Later, the same two authors found this name to be preoccupied by the flatworm genus Haplopharynx (Meixner, 1938), so it was renamed to Haplopharyngomyia in 1999.

The generic name is derived from the Greek words ᾰ̔πλόος (hăplóos, 'simple'), φᾰ́ρῠγξ (phắrŭnx, 'digestive tube') and μυῖᾰ (muîă, 'fly').

== Species ==
- Haplopharyngomyia mutilus (Grootaert & Meuffels, 1998)
- Haplopharyngomyia phangngensis (Grootaert & Meuffels, 1998)
