= Sympycnus =

- Sympycnus sp.

Scientific classification
- Kingdom: Animalia
- Phylum: Arthropoda
- Clade: Pancrustacea
- Class: Insecta
- Order: Diptera
- Family: Dolichopodidae
- Subfamily: Sympycninae
- Genus: Sympycnus; Loew, 1857

Type species
- Porphyrops annulipes ( = Dolichopus pulicarius Fallen, 1823) Meigen, 1824

Subgenera
- Subsympycnus Becker, 1922

Synonyms
- Gymnoceromyia Bigot, 1890

Genus of flies

Sympycnus is a genus of flies in the family Dolichopodidae.

== Species ==
Subgenus Sympycnus Loew, 1857:

- Sympycnus adustus Parent, 1932
- Sympycnus aeneicoxa (Meigen, 1824)
- Sympycnus aequalis Becker, 1922
- Sympycnus aequatoralis Becker, 1919
- Sympycnus albibarbus Parent, 1932
- Sympycnus albiciliatus Van Duzee, 1930
- Sympycnus albicinctus Parent, 1932
- Sympycnus albihirtus Van Duzee, 1930
- Sympycnus albinotatus Parent, 1933
- Sympycnus albisignatus (Becker, 1924)
- Sympycnus aldrichi Van Duzee, 1930
- Sympycnus allectorius Parent, 1932
- Sympycnus ambalamanakana Grichanov, 2008
- Sympycnus ambulator Parent, 1932
- Sympycnus amplitarsus Parent, 1933
- Sympycnus andicola (Bigot, 1890)
- Sympycnus angulinervis Parent, 1939
- Sympycnus angustipennis Aldrich, 1901
- Sympycnus annulatus Parent, 1929
- Sympycnus anomalipennis Becker, 1922
- Sympycnus anormalis Parent, 1932
- Sympycnus antarcticus (Walker, 1837)
- Sympycnus antennatus Becker, 1922
- Sympycnus anticus Becker, 1919
- Sympycnus antiquus Parent, 1935
- Sympycnus appendiculatus Van Duzee, 1930
- Sympycnus argentimanus Parent, 1932
- Sympycnus armatus Becker, 1922
- Sympycnus astutus Parent, 1932
- Sympycnus audax Parent, 1932
- Sympycnus aurifacies Van Duzee, 1923
- Sympycnus basilaris (Curran, 1924)
- Sympycnus basistylatus Parent, 1929
- Sympycnus bicoloripes Van Duzee, 1930
- Sympycnus bifidus Becker, 1919
- Sympycnus bipilus Van Duzee, 1929
- Sympycnus bredini Robinson, 1975
- Sympycnus brevicauda Van Duzee, 1932
- Sympycnus brevicornis Parent, 1933
- Sympycnus brevimanus Loew, 1857
- Sympycnus brevinervis De Meijere, 1916
- Sympycnus brevipes Van Duzee, 1933
- Sympycnus brevitalus Van Duzee, 1930
- Sympycnus brevitarsis Becker, 1922
- Sympycnus breviventris Van Duzee, 1930
- Sympycnus bullocki Van Duzee, 1933
- Sympycnus caffer Loew, 1858
- Sympycnus calcaratus Van Duzee, 1930
- Sympycnus campbelli Parent, 1933
- Sympycnus capilliger Parent, 1932
- Sympycnus changaicus Negrobov, 1973
- Sympycnus chawia Grichanov, 2008
- Sympycnus chilensis Parent, 1928
- Sympycnus ciliatus Becker, 1922
- Sympycnus cilifemoratus Parent, 1932
- Sympycnus cilitibia Parent, 1932
- Sympycnus cinctellus (Frey, 1928)
- Sympycnus cirripes (Haliday, 1851)
- Sympycnus claudicans Parent, 1932
- Sympycnus clavatus Van Duzee, 1913
- Sympycnus cleistogamus Parent, 1935
- Sympycnus colliepa Bickel, 2013
- Sympycnus comatus Van Duzee, 1931
- Sympycnus comorensis Grichanov, 2008
- Sympycnus congensis Curran, 1929
- Sympycnus contemptus Parent, 1933
- Sympycnus crassitarsus Parent, 1932
- Sympycnus crinipes Becker, 1922
- Sympycnus cuprinus Wheeler, 1899
- Sympycnus cylindricus Van Duzee, 1930
- Sympycnus dampfi Van Duzee, 1934
- Sympycnus davidyani Grichanov, 2008
- Sympycnus deserti Vaillant, 1953
- Sympycnus dichaetus Parent, 1932
- Sympycnus difficilis Van Duzee, 1930
- Sympycnus diluae Bickel in Bickel & Martin, 2016
- Sympycnus discolor (Bigot, 1890)
- Sympycnus discrepanoides Grichanov, 2008
- Sympycnus distinctus Parent, 1933
- Sympycnus diversipes Van Duzee, 1930
- Sympycnus dolosus Parent, 1934
- Sympycnus dominicensis Robinson, 1975
- Sympycnus dominulus Parent, 1932
- Sympycnus du Curran, 1929
- Sympycnus edwardsi Parent, 1933
- Sympycnus elangeli Becker, 1919
- Sympycnus elegans Parent, 1932
- Sympycnus ephydroides Bickel, 2013
- Sympycnus eremicus Bickel in Bickel & Martin, 2016
- Sympycnus erraneus Becker, 1922
- Sympycnus fasciventris Van Duzee, 1917
- Sympycnus fatuus Parent, 1932
- Sympycnus ferganicus Negrobov, Grichanov & Selivanova, 2017
- Sympycnus fernandezensis Harmston, 1955
- Sympycnus filiformis Van Duzee, 1929
- Sympycnus fimbriatus Parent, 1932
- Sympycnus flaviciliatus Van Duzee, 1931
- Sympycnus formosinus Becker, 1922
- Sympycnus fuscipennis Van Duzee, 1930
- Sympycnus fusciventris Van Duzee, 1930
- Sympycnus gauri Hollis, 1964
- Sympycnus geniculatus Parent, 1932
- Sympycnus gewai Bickel in Bickel & Martin, 2016
- Sympycnus globulicauda Van Duzee, 1930
- Sympycnus globulitarsis Becker, 1922
- Sympycnus gorodkovi Negrobov, Barkalov, Selivanova & Grichanov, 2016
- Sympycnus gracilipes Parent, 1933
- Sympycnus gracilis Parent, 1934
- Sympycnus grandicornis Van Duzee, 1930
- Sympycnus gregori Olejnichek & Stark, 1999
- Sympycnus hamatus Becker, 1922
- Sympycnus hamulitarsus Bickel, 2013
- Sympycnus harrisi Parent, 1933
- Sympycnus hispidus Becker, 1908
- Sympycnus humilis Parent, 1933
- Sympycnus ignavus Parent, 1933
- Sympycnus ignotus Parent, 1928
- Sympycnus infimus Parent, 1932
- Sympycnus inornatus (Botosaneanu & Vaillant, 1973)
- Sympycnus insolens Van Duzee, 1930
- Sympycnus integer Becker, 1922
- Sympycnus intermedius Becker, 1922
- Sympycnus kakamega Grichanov, 2008
- Sympycnus khola Hollis, 1964
- Sympycnus kinangop Grichanov, 2008
- Sympycnus kowarzi Parent, 1925
- Sympycnus lacrimulus Bickel, 2013
- Sympycnus laevigatus Van Duzee, 1930
- Sympycnus latifacies Robinson, 1975
- Sympycnus latifasciatus Parent, 1935
- Sympycnus latitarsis Van Duzee, 1930
- Sympycnus leleji Negrobov, Grichanov & Selivanova, 2017
- Sympycnus liber Parent, 1932
- Sympycnus lineatus Loew, 1861
- Sympycnus lobatus Van Duzee, 1930
- Sympycnus longicornis Parent, 1933
- Sympycnus longinervis Van Duzee, 1932
- Sympycnus longipes Van Duzee, 1929
- Sympycnus longipilus Parent, 1933
- Sympycnus luctuosus (Bigot, 1888)
- Sympycnus luteinotatus Parent, 1933
- Sympycnus madagascaricus Grichanov, 2008
- Sympycnus magnus Van Duzee, 1930
- Sympycnus marcidus Wheeler, 1899
- Sympycnus marginatus Parent, 1932
- Sympycnus marronensis (Meuffels & Grootaert, 2007)
- Sympycnus medius Parent, 1932
- Sympycnus memorabilis Parent, 1932
- Sympycnus minor Parent, 1937
- Sympycnus minuticornis Van Duzee, 1932
- Sympycnus minutus Parent, 1932
- Sympycnus miricornis Parent, 1932
- Sympycnus modestus Parent, 1933
- Sympycnus moestus Parent, 1933
- Sympycnus montanus Van Duzee, 1930
- Sympycnus monticolus Becker, 1919
- Sympycnus montserratensis Runyon, 2020
- Sympycnus muscicolus (Vaillant, 1952)
- Sympycnus nemoralis (Philippi, 1865)
- Sympycnus neoplacidus Grichanov, 2008
- Sympycnus nephophilus Robinson, 1975
- Sympycnus nigriciliatus Becker, 1922
- Sympycnus nigricoxa Becker, 1922
- Sympycnus nitidifrons Parent, 1939
- Sympycnus normalis Parent, 1933
- Sympycnus nudus Becker, 1922
- Sympycnus obscuratus Brethes, 1920
- Sympycnus obscurus Parent, 1932
- Sympycnus olejnicheki Negrobov, Barkalov & Selivanova, 2013
- Sympycnus ornatipes Parent, 1933
- Sympycnus ornatus Parent, 1933
- Sympycnus pacificus Parent, 1932
- Sympycnus pahar Hollis, 1964
- Sympycnus pallidicornis Van Duzee, 1930
- Sympycnus pallidimanus Van Duzee, 1933
- Sympycnus parvulus Van Duzee, 1930
- Sympycnus patellatus Parent, 1928
- Sympycnus patellitaris Becker, 1922
- Sympycnus pauper Parent, 1932
- Sympycnus pectoralis Van Duzee, 1933
- Sympycnus peniculitarsus Hollis, 1964
- Sympycnus pennatus Van Duzee, 1930
- Sympycnus pentachaetus Robinson, 1975
- Sympycnus pessimplex Steyskal, 1967
- Sympycnus picticornis Van Duzee, 1930
- Sympycnus piltarsis Becker, 1922
- Sympycnus pistillus Bickel, 2013
- Sympycnus planipes Van Duzee, 1931
- Sympycnus platychirus Parent, 1932
- Sympycnus platypus Becker, 1922
- Sympycnus plexsim Dyte & Smith, 1980
- Sympycnus pollinosus Van Duzee, 1930
- Sympycnus praeteritus Parent, 1929
- Sympycnus prolatus Vanschuytbroeck, 1951
- Sympycnus proletarius Parent, 1932
- Sympycnus propinquus Parent, 1932
- Sympycnus puerulus Bezzi, 1928
- Sympycnus pugil Wheeler, 1899
- Sympycnus pugiopes Becker, 1908
- Sympycnus pulchritarsis Vanschuytbroeck, 1951
- Sympycnus pulicarius (Fallen, 1823)
- Sympycnus pulvillus Van Duzee, 1930
- Sympycnus purpurascens De Meijere, 1916
- Sympycnus residuus Becker, 1922
- Sympycnus rutiloides Hollis, 1964
- Sympycnus scitulus Parent, 1932
- Sympycnus septentrionalis Pollet in Pollet, Persson, Bøggild & Crossley, 2015
- Sympycnus seticosta Negrobov, 1973
- Sympycnus setifemoratus Parent, 1932
- Sympycnus setosipes Speiser, 1910
- Sympycnus setosus Van Duzee, 1930
- Sympycnus sierraleonensis Grichanov, 2008
- Sympycnus simplex De Meijere, 1916
- Sympycnus simplicitarsis Becker, 1900
- Sympycnus spiculatus Gerstacker, 1864
- Sympycnus spinipes Van Duzee, 1930
- Sympycnus spinitarsus Van Duzee, 1932
- Sympycnus stackelbergi Negrobov, Grichanov & Selivanova, 2017
- Sympycnus strobli Parent, 1927
- Sympycnus subaristalis Grichanov, 2008
- Sympycnus subdilatatus Van Duzee, 1930
- Sympycnus subjectus Becker, 1922
- Sympycnus sussexensis Grichanov, 2008
- Sympycnus taimyricus Negrobov, Barkalov, Selivanova & Grichanov, 2016
- Sympycnus takagii Hollis, 1964
- Sympycnus tamtiaii Bickel in Bickel & Martin, 2016
- Sympycnus tasmanicus Parent, 1932
- Sympycnus tenueciliatus Parent, 1933
- Sympycnus tenuifacies (Vaillant, 1973)
- Sympycnus tenuipes Becker, 1922
- Sympycnus terminalis Van Duzee, 1930
- Sympycnus tertianus Loew, 1864
- Sympycnus thrypticiformis (Frey, 1925)
- Sympycnus utahensis Harmston & Knowlton, 1939
- Sympycnus vadimi Negrobov, 1973
- Sympycnus varicolor Parent, 1932
- Sympycnus varipes Aldrich, 1901
- Sympycnus vermiculatus Parent, 1932
- Sympycnus violaceus Lamb, 1922
- Sympycnus vivus Becker, 1922
- Sympycnus weano Bickel, 2013
- Sympycnus yakutensis Negrobov, Grichanov & Selivanova, 2017
- Sympycnus zomba Grichanov, 2008

Subgenus Subsympycnus Becker, 1922:

- Sympycnus griseicollis (Becker, 1922)

The following are synonyms of other species:

- Sympycnus annulipes (Meigen, 1824): Synonym of Sympycnus pulicarius (Fallen, 1823)
- Sympycnus annulipes var. brunnitibialis Santos Abreu, 1929: Synonym of Sympycnus pulicarius (Fallen, 1823)
- Sympycnus cinerellus (Zetterstedt, 1838): Synonym of Sympycnus pulicarius (Fallen, 1823)
- Sympycnus desoutteri Parent, 1925: Synonym of Sympycnus pulicarius (Fallen, 1823)
- Sympycnus pygmaeus (Macquart, 1827): Synonym of Sympycnus pulicarius (Fallen, 1823)

The following species have been transferred to other genera:

- Sympycnus flaviantenna Tang, Wang & Yang, 2015: transferred to Campsicnemus
- Sympycnus longipilosus Tang, Wang & Yang, 2015: transferred to Campsicnemus
