= Erebomyia =

Scientific classification
- Kingdom: Animalia
- Phylum: Arthropoda
- Class: Insecta
- Order: Diptera
- Family: Dolichopodidae
- Subfamily: Sympycninae
- Genus: Erebomyia; Runyon & Hurley, 2004

Type species
- Erebomyia exalloptera Runyon & Hurley, 2004

Genus of flies

Erebomyia is a genus of flies in the family Dolichopodidae, known from the United States. Three species are known from Arizona, and one from California. The genus was first created in 2004 for Erebomyia exalloptera, a species whose males have uniquely asymmetrical wings – the left wing is larger and has a different shape compared to the right wing. The males of the remaining three species have modified but symmetrical wings.

== Species ==
- Erebomyia aetheoptera Hurley & Runyon, 2009
- Erebomyia exalloptera Runyon & Hurley, 2004
- Erebomyia inaequalis (Van Duzee, 1930) (Synonym: E. akidoptera Hurley & Runyon, 2009)
- Erebomyia ramseyensis Hurley & Runyon, 2009
