= Parasyntormon =

Scientific classification
- Kingdom: Animalia
- Phylum: Arthropoda
- Clade: Pancrustacea
- Class: Insecta
- Order: Diptera
- Family: Dolichopodidae
- Subfamily: Sympycninae
- Genus: Parasyntormon; Wheeler, 1899

Type species
- Parasyntormon asellus Wheeler, 1899

Synonyms
- Neosyntormon Curran, 1934

Genus of flies

Parasyntormon is a genus of flies in the family Dolichopodidae. It is closely related to Syntormon, and was formerly considered a synonym of it.

== Species ==
- Parasyntormon appendiculatus Harmston & Knowlton, 1943 – United States (Utah)
- Parasyntormon asellus Wheeler, 1899 – United States (California, Colorado)
- Parasyntormon classicus Harmston & Knowlton, 1943 – United States (Utah)
- Parasyntormon emarginatus Wheeler, 1899 – United States (California)
- Parasyntormon emarginicornis Curran, 1923 – Canada (British Columbia, Alberta, Saskatchewan, Manitoba)
- Parasyntormon flavicoxa Van Duzee, 1922 – United States (California)
- Parasyntormon fraterculus Van Duzee, 1922 – United States (California, Nevada)
- Parasyntormon hendersoni Harmston & Knowlton, 1939 – United States (Oregon, Utah)
- Parasyntormon hinnulus Wheeler, 1899 – United States (Wyoming, South Dakota)
- Parasyntormon inornatus Becker, 1919 – Ecuador
- Parasyntormon lagotis Wheeler, 1899 – United States (California)
- Parasyntormon lepus Van Duzee, 1918 – United States (California)
- Parasyntormon longicornis Van Duzee, 1933 – United States (Oregon)
- Parasyntormon montivagus Wheeler, 1899 – United States (California, Utah, Wyoming)
- Parasyntormon mulinus Van Duzee, 1922 – United States (California)
- Parasyntormon nigripes Harmston & Knowlton, 1943 – United States (Utah)
- Parasyntormon occidentalis (Aldrich, 1894) – United States (Nevada, Utah, Montana, Wyoming)
- Parasyntormon petiolatus Van Duzee, 1933 – United States (California)
- Parasyntormon rotundicornis Van Duzee, 1926 – Canada (Nova Scotia)
- Parasyntormon utahnus Van Duzee, 1933 – United States (Utah)
- Parasyntormon virens Harmston & Knowlton, 1943 – United States (Utah)
- Parasyntormon wheeleri Aldrich, 1901 – Mexico
