= David Miller (entomologist) =

New Zealand entomologist (1890–1973)

David Miller CBE
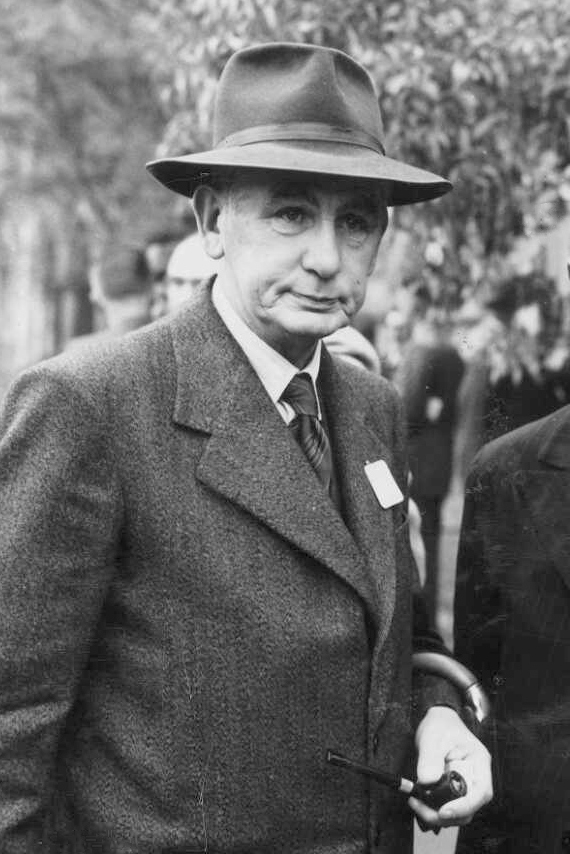
- Miller, c. 1956
- Born: 21 February 1890; Glasgow, Lanarkshire, Scotland
- Died: 28 April 1973 (aged 83); Nelson, New Zealand
- Education: Victoria University College
- Spouse: Lena Davies (m. 1916)
- Children: 2
- Scientific career
- Fields: Entomology
- Workplaces: Department of Agriculture; Cawthron Institute
- Thesis: (1928)

David Miller CBE (21 February 1890 – 28 April 1973) was a notable New Zealand entomologist, university lecturer and scientific administrator. He was born in Glasgow, Lanarkshire, Scotland, on 21 February 1890.

== Scientific contributions ==
Miller's career in entomology started at the Biological Laboratory in Levin, New Zealand, where he investigated the insect fauna of New Zealand flax for the New Zealand Department of Agriculture. Later, he worked with the Department of Health to study mosquitos. Miller's research was also fundamental to timber preservation, especially in controlling insect pests.

Miller spent the final years of his career as director of the Cawthron Institute. In 1953, he was awarded the Queen Elizabeth II Coronation Medal, and in the 1958 Queen's Birthday Honours, he was appointed a Commander of the Order of the British Empire.
