= Oleg Negrobov =

Russian entomologist (1941–2021)

Oleg Pavlovich Negrobov (Russian: Олег Павлович Негробов; 22 November 1941, Voronezh – 8 January 2021) was a Russian entomologist and professor, from Voronezh. He studied in Voronezh State University. He described more than 350 taxa of Dolichopodidae, a family of flies. The fly genera Negrobovia and Olegonegrobovia were named in his honor. He was a member of the Civic Chamber of Voronezh Oblast.

== Sources ==
- O. P. Negrobov
