= Igor Grichanov =

Russian entomologist and ecologist

Igor Yakovlevich Grichanov Игорь Яковлевич Гричанов
- Born: September 10, 1958 (age 67); Voronezh, USSR
- Citizenship: Soviet Union, Russia
- Education: Voronezh State University, Russia
- Known for: entomologist, dipterologist
- Awards: Member of Russian Entomological Society Presidium, 2012
- Scientific career
- Fields: Entomologist, ecologist
- Workplaces: All-Russian Institute of Plant Protection, Saint-Petersburg, Russia

Igor Yakovlevich Grichanov (Russian: Игорь Яковлевич Гричанов; born 10 September 1958) is a Russian entomologist and ecologist. As a taxonomist, he specialised on Diptera notably Dolichopodidae. He joined the staff of the All-Russian Institute of Plant Protection in 1981. In 1990, he became the Head of the Laboratory of Phytosanitary Diagnostics and Forecasts. He wrote over 470 scientific papers (1979-2016). Не has described 55 new genera and over 560 new species of flies.

== Selected works ==
- Sigvald R., Grichanov I. Ya. (Eds.). Crop Protection Conference - Pests, Diseases and Weeds, May 28–30, 2002. Conference Report 01, Uppsala: SLU, 2003. 292 p.
- Grichanov I. Ya. Review of Afrotropical Dolichopodinae (Diptera: Dolichopodidae). St.Petersburg: VIZR, 2004. 245 p.
- Grichanov I. Ya. A checklist and keys to North European genera and species of Dolichopodidae (Diptera). St.Petersburg: VIZR, 2006. 120 p.
- Grichanov I. Ya. A checklist and keys to Dolichopodidae (Diptera) of the Caucasus and East Mediterranean. St.Petersburg: VIZR, 2007. 160 p.
- Grichanov I. Ya. An illustrated synopsis and keys to afrotropical genera of the epifamily Dolichopodoidae (Diptera: Empidoidea). Priamus Supplement, Ankara, 2011, v. 24. 98 p., 305 figs.
- Grichanov I. Ya., Negrobov O. P. (Eds.). Fauna and taxonomy of Dolichopodidae (Diptera). Collection of papers. St.Petersburg: VIZR, 2013. 96 p.
- Grichanov I. Ya., Negrobov O. P. Palaearctic species of the genus Sciapus Zeller (Diptera: Dolichopodidae). St.Petersburg, VIZR, 2014. 84 p..
- Grichanov I. Ya. Alphabetic list of generic and specific names of predatory flies of the epifamily Dolichopodoidae (Diptera). St.Petersburg, VIZR, 2014. 544 p..
