= Octave Parent =

French entomologist

Abbé Octave Parent (15 June 1882, in Trescault – 9 February 1942, in Ambleteuse) was a French entomologist who specialized in Diptera, mostly the family Dolichopodidae. He became director of the Biological Station, Ambleteuse.

He published three papers, dated 1934, 1937 and 1940, concerning twenty-six new species of Hawaiian Campsicnemus. The type specimens of all the species described in the 1937 paper were deposited in the collection of the Hawaiian Entomological Society. The species Sigmatineurum parenti, found in Hawaii, is named in memory of Parent, "in honor of his foundational work with Hawaiian dolichopodids and for describing the genus Sigmatineurum".

== Publications ==
Parent published numerous works from 1913 onwards, including:

- Parent, O. (1928). Etude sur les diptères dolichopodides exotiques conservès au Zoologisches Staatsinstitut und Zoologisches Museum de Hambourg. Zoologisches Staatsinstitut u. Zoolog. Museum.
- Parent, O. (1928). Contribution à la faune diptérologique de l'Espagne. Museo.
- Parent, O. (1931). Diptères Dolichopodides de l'Amérique du Sud: espèces nouvelles figurant dans la collection Schnuse conservée aux Staatliche museen für tierkunde und völkerkunde zu Dresden (Vol. 18). BG Teubner.
- Parent, O. (1932). Etude sur les types de Bigot (Dipteres, Dolichopodides). In Annales de la Société Scientifique de Bruxelles ser. B (Vol. 52, No. pt 1, pp. 215–231).
- Parent, O. (1933). Nouvelle étude sur les Diptères Dolichopodides de la région Australienne.
- Parent, O. (1933). Étude monographique sur les diptères dolichopodides de Nouvelle-Zélande.
- Parent, O., & Parent, O. (1938). Diptères dolichopodidae. Lechevalier. Éditions Faune de France 35. 720 p., 1.002 fig. Bibliotheque Virtuelle Numerique pdf
