= List of Thrypticus species =

This is a list of 92 species in Thrypticus, a genus of long-legged flies in the family Dolichopodidae.

== Thrypticus species ==
- Thrypticus abditus Becker, 1922^{c g}
- Thrypticus abdominalis (Say, 1829)^{i c g}
- Thrypticus acuticauda Van Duzee, 1929^{c g}
- Thrypticus adauctus Parent, 1933^{c g}
- Thrypticus aequalis Robinson, 1975^{c g}
- Thrypticus afer Vanschuytbroeck, 1951^{c g}
- Thrypticus altaicus Negrobov in Negrobov & Stackelberg, 1971^{c g}
- Thrypticus amoenus Becker, 1922^{c g}
- Thrypticus analis Becker, 1922^{c g}
- Thrypticus aphroditus Negrobov & Tsurikov, 1986^{c g}
- Thrypticus arahakiensis Bickel, 1992^{c g}
- Thrypticus armatus Robinson, 1975^{c g}
- Thrypticus atomus Frey, 1915^{c g}
- Thrypticus aurinotatus Van Duzee, 1915^{i c g}
- Thrypticus australis Bickel, 1986^{c g}
- Thrypticus azuricola Bickel & Hernández, 2004^{c g}
- Thrypticus basalis Van Duzee, 1930^{c g}
- Thrypticus bellus Loew, 1869^{c g}
- Thrypticus bolevensis Kejval & Pollet, 2024
- Thrypticus brevicauda Van Duzee, 1930^{c g}
- Thrypticus caeruleus Naglis & Negrobov, 2020
- Thrypticus caudatus Parent, 1939^{c g}
- Thrypticus chanophallus Bickel & Hernández, 2004^{c g}
- Thrypticus circularis Bickel & Hernández, 2004^{c g}
- Thrypticus comosus Van Duzee, 1915^{i c g}
- Thrypticus crinipes Robinson, 1975^{c g}
- Thrypticus cuneatus (Becker, 1917)^{c g}
- Thrypticus cynicus Drake & Godfrey in Drake, Godfrey & Gibbs, 2023
- Thrypticus deficiens Robinson, 1980^{i c g}
- Thrypticus delicatus Robinson, 1975^{c g}
- Thrypticus dissectus Robinson, 1964^{i c g}
- Thrypticus divisus (Strobl, 1880)^{c g}
- Thrypticus edwardsi Van Duzee, 1931^{c g}
- Thrypticus emiliae Negrobov in Negrobov & Stackelberg, 1971^{c g}
- Thrypticus flavicornis Van Duzee, 1933^{c g}
- Thrypticus formosensis Bickel & Hernández, 2004^{c g}
- Thrypticus fortescuensis Bickel, 1986^{c g}
- Thrypticus fosteri Robinson, 1980^{i c g}
- Thrypticus fraterculus (Wheeler, 1890)^{i c g}
- Thrypticus grogani Robinson, 1980^{i c g}
- Thrypticus incanus Negrobov, 1967^{c g}
- Thrypticus intercedens Negrobov, 1967^{c g}
- Thrypticus kataevi Grichanov, 1998^{c g}
- Thrypticus laetus Verrall, 1912^{c g}
- Thrypticus lichanus Drake in Drake, Godfrey & Gibbs, 2023
- Thrypticus longicauda Van Duzee, 1921^{i c g}
- Thrypticus mediofuscus Runyon, 2020
- Thrypticus minor (Aldrich, 1896)^{c g}
- Thrypticus minutus Parent, 1929^{i c}
- Thrypticus mironovi Grichanov, 1998^{c g}
- Thrypticus mongoliensis Negrobov, Selivanova & Maslova, 2019
- Thrypticus muhlenbergiae Johannsen & Crosby, 1913^{i c g}
- Thrypticus nigricauda Wood, 1913^{c g}
- Thrypticus nigripes Van Duzee, 1921^{i c g}
- Thrypticus nigriseta Van Duzee, 1931^{c g}
- Thrypticus pallidicoxa Parent, 1928^{c g}
- Thrypticus paludicola Negrobov in Negrobov & Stackelberg, 1971^{c g}
- Thrypticus parabellus Grichanov, 2000^{c g}
- Thrypticus parvulus Van Duzee, 1930^{c g}
- Thrypticus penicillatus Van Duzee, 1931^{c g}
- Thrypticus politus Negrobov, 1967^{c g}
- Thrypticus pollinosus Verrall, 1912^{c g}
- Thrypticus pruinosus Parent, 1932^{c g}
- Thrypticus pusillus Aldrich, 1901^{c g}
- Thrypticus riparius Negrobov in Negrobov & Stackelberg, 1971^{c g}
- Thrypticus romus Bickel & Hernández, 2004^{c g}
- Thrypticus sagittatus Bickel & Hernández, 2004^{c g}
- Thrypticus schmidti Parent, 1928^{c g}
- Thrypticus scutellatus Van Duzee, 1931^{c g}
- Thrypticus senilis Robinson, 1975^{c g}
- Thrypticus sinevi Grichanov, 1998^{c g}
- Thrypticus singularis (Aldrich, 1896)^{c g}
- Thrypticus smaragdinus Gerstäcker, 1864^{g}
- Thrypticus spretus Parent, 1934^{c g}
- Thrypticus squamiciliatus Harmston & Rapp, 1968^{i c g}
- Thrypticus subdissectus Robinson, 1975^{c g}
- Thrypticus subtilis Negrobov in Negrobov & Stackelberg, 1971
- Thrypticus sumatranus Hollis, 1964^{c g}
- Thrypticus taragui Bickel & Hernández, 2004^{c g}
- Thrypticus tarsalis Parent, 1932^{c g}
- Thrypticus tectus Van Duzee, 1915^{i c g}
- Thrypticus tropicus Bickel, 1986^{c g}
- Thrypticus truncatus Bickel & Hernández, 2004^{c g}
- Thrypticus tsacasi Negrobov in Negrobov & Stackelberg, 1971^{c g}
- Thrypticus varipes Robinson, 1975^{c g}
- Thrypticus vestitus Negrobov in Negrobov & Stackelberg, 1971^{c g}
- Thrypticus vietus Van Duzee, 1915^{i c g}
- Thrypticus violaceus Van Duzee, 1927^{i c g b}
- Thrypticus virescens Negrobov, 1967^{c g}
- Thrypticus willistoni (Wheeler, 1890)^{i c g b}
- Thrypticus yanayacu Bickel & Hernández, 2004^{c g}
- Thrypticus zagulyaevi Grichanov, 1998^{c g}

Unrecognised species:

- Thrypticus aeneus (Meigen, 1838)^{c g}
- Thrypticus alpinus (Meigen, 1824)^{c g}
- Thrypticus bicolor (Macquart, 1827)^{c g}
- Thrypticus coeruleocephalus (Meigen, 1824)^{c}
- Thrypticus cupreus (Macquart, 1838)^{c g}
- Thrypticus cylindricum (Zetterstedt, 1838)^{c g}
- Thrypticus decoratus (Haliday, 1832)^{c g}
- Thrypticus exiguus (Zetterstedt, 1843)^{c g}
- Thrypticus festiva (Meigen, 1838)^{c g}
- Thrypticus fasciatus (Macquart, 1834)^{c g}
- Thrypticus fulgidus (Fallen, 1823)^{c g}
- Thrypticus inconspicuus (Zetterstedt, 1843)^{c g}
- Thrypticus longicollis (Meigen, 1824)^{c g}
- Thrypticus maculipes (Meigen, 1824)^{c g}
- Thrypticus magnicornis (Zetterstedt, 1843)^{c g}
- Thrypticus minuta (Fabricius, 1805)^{c g}
- Thrypticus misellus (Boheman, 1852)^{c g}
- Thrypticus obscuratus (Meigen, 1824)^{c g}
- Thrypticus parvus (Macquart, 1834)^{c g}
- Thrypticus rufipes (Meigen, 1838)^{c g}
- Thrypticus sublamellatus (Macquart, 1827)^{c g}
- Thrypticus suturalis (Meigen, 1830)^{c g}
- Thrypticus thoracicus (Meigen, 1824)^{c g}

Synonyms:

- Thrypticus cupulifer (Aldrich, 1896):^{c g} synonym of Thrypticus abdominalis (Say, 1829)
- Thrypticus fennicus Becker, 1917:^{c g} synonym of Thrypticus divisus (Strobl, 1880)
- Thrypticus insulanus Van Duzee, 1933:^{c g} synonym of Thrypticus minutus Parent, 1929
- Thrypticus kechevi Naglis & Negrobov, 2020: transferred to Corindia, synonym of Corindia viridis (Parent, 1932)
- Thrypticus tonsus Negrobov in Negrobov & Stackelberg, 1972:^{c g} synonym of Thrypticus subtilis Negrobov in Negrobov & Stackelberg, 1971
- Thrypticus viridis Parent, 1932:^{c g} transferred to Corindia
- †Thrypticus gestuosus Meunier, 1907: transferred to Medeterites
- †Thrypticus gulosus Meunier, 1907: transferred to Medeterites

The following species are unplaced in the family:

- †Thrypticus sobrius Meunier, 1907

The following are listed for the genus by online databases, but are actually placed in other genera:

- Thrypticus dissimilipes (Zetterstedt, 1843):^{c g} Actually in Dolichopus, synonym of Dolichopus lepidus Staeger, 1842
- Thrypticus flavicoxa (Meigen, 1824):^{c g} Actually in Anepsiomyia, synonym of Anepsiomyia flaviventris (Meigen, 1824)
- Thrypticus flaviventris (Macquart, 1827):^{c g} Actually in Argyra, synonym of Argyra ilonae Gosseries, 1989
- Thrypticus fulviventris (Macquart, 1827):^{c g} Actually in Argyra, synonym of Argyra leucocephala (Meigen, 1824)
- Thrypticus pygmaeus (Macquart, 1828):^{c g} Actually in Sympycnus, synonym of Sympycnus pulicarius (Fallen, 1823)
- Thrypticus ruficauda (Zetterstedt, 1859):^{c g} Actually in Hercostomus
- Thrypticus taeniomerus (Zetterstedt, 1843):^{c g} Actually in Chrysotus, possible synonym of Chrysotus pulchellus Kowarz, 1874
- Thrypticus thalassinus (Haliday, 1832):^{c g} Actually in Dolichopus, possible synonym of Dolichopus simplex Meigen, 1824
- Thrypticus tibialis (von Roser, 1840):^{c g} Actually in Rhaphium
- Thrypticus zonatulus (Zetterstedt, 1843):^{c g} Actually in Sciapus

Data sources: i = ITIS, c = Catalogue of Life, g = GBIF, b = Bugguide.net
