= Hurleyella =

Scientific classification
- Kingdom: Animalia
- Phylum: Arthropoda
- Class: Insecta
- Order: Diptera
- Family: Dolichopodidae
- Subfamily: incertae sedis
- Genus: Hurleyella; Runyon & Robinson, 2010

Type species
- Hurleyella cumberlandensis Runyon & Robinson, 2010

Genus of flies

Hurleyella is a genus of small flies in the family Dolichopodidae from the Nearctic and Neotropical realms. The genus belongs to the "micro-dolichopodids", an informal group of genera from the New World which have a body length of 1 mm or less. Hurleyella appears to be most closely related to the genera Microcyrtura, Microchrysotus and Micromedetera. The subfamily placement of this genus is currently uncertain, though in some aspects the genus fits into Medeterinae. The genus is named after the late dipterist Richard Hurley.

Adults of Hurleyella are found in relatively dry, open habitats, unlike other known micro-dolichopodids which prefer or are restricted to moist habitats.

== Species ==
Four species are currently included in the genus:

- Hurleyella belizensis Runyon, 2019 – Belize
- Hurleyella brooksi Runyon & Robinson, 2010 – Texas
- Hurleyella cumberlandensis Runyon & Robinson, 2010 – Virginia
- Hurleyella salina Runyon, 2019 – Idaho, Montana, Wyoming
