= Cyrturella =

Scientific classification
- Kingdom: Animalia
- Phylum: Arthropoda
- Class: Insecta
- Order: Diptera
- Family: Dolichopodidae
- Subfamily: Medeterinae
- Tribe: Medeterini
- Genus: Cyrturella; Collin, 1952

Type species
- Micromorphus albosetosus Strobl, 1909

Synonyms
- Cyrtura Parent, 1938 (nec Jaekel, 1904)

Genus of flies

Cyrturella is a genus of flies in the family Dolichopodidae. It comprises two species from the Palearctic realm, Cyrturella albosetosa and Cyrturella nigrosetosa, though the former is considered rare in its range and the latter is known from only one female collected in the Sinai Peninsula. Adults are tiny in size, having a body length of about 1 mm.

The genus was created by Octave Parent in 1938 for the species Micromorphus albosetosus, and was originally given the name Cyrtura. This name for the genus was already in use by the extinct stem-turtle genus Cyrtura, so Parent's genus was renamed to Cyrturella by James Edward Collin in 1952.

== Species ==
- Cyrturella albosetosa (Strobl, 1909) – Spain, England, Germany, Hungary, Portugal, ?France
- Cyrturella nigrosetosa Grichanov, 2016 – Egypt: Sinai Peninsula

Cyrturella orientalis Hollis, 1964 was moved to Paramedetera.
