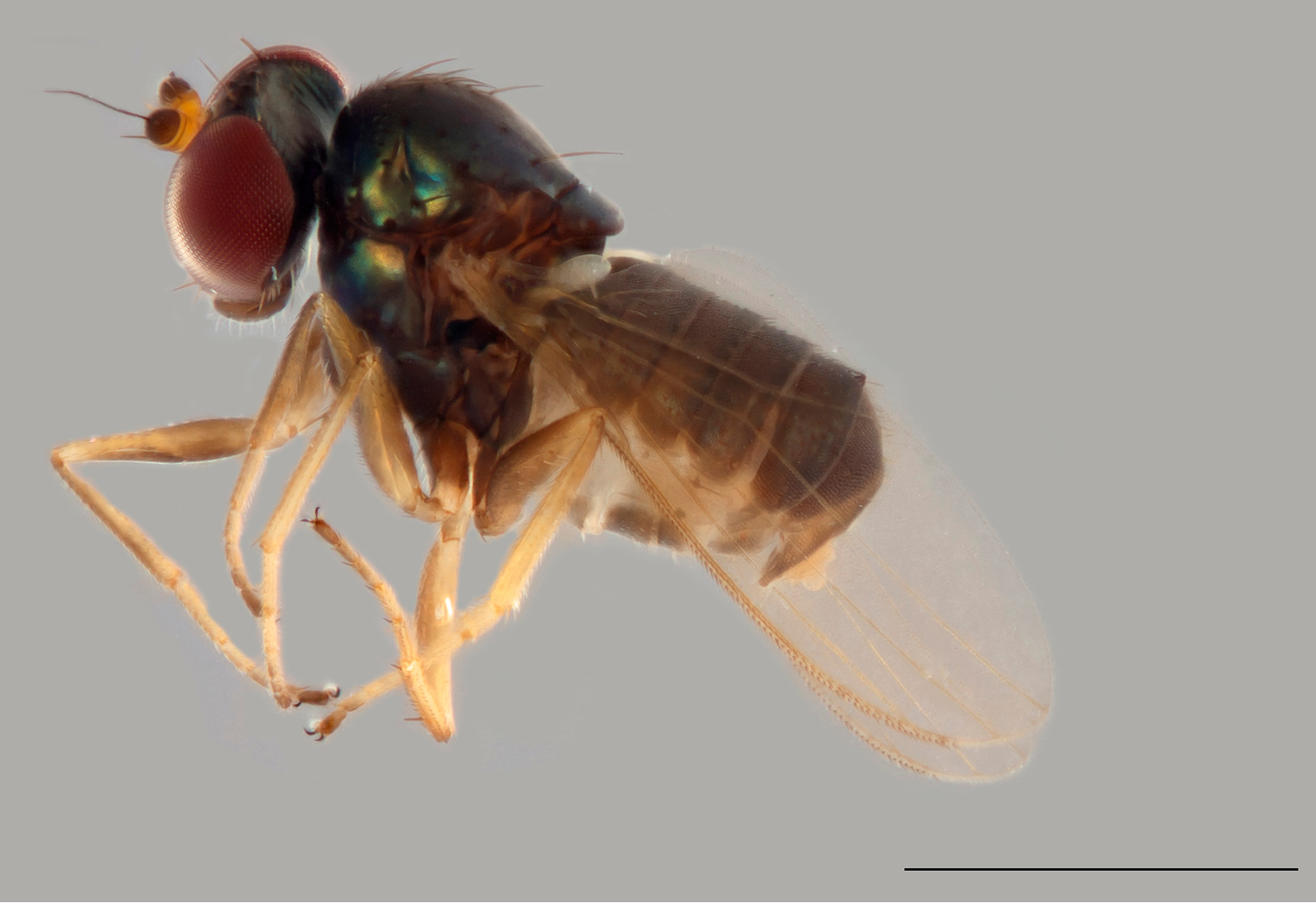
- Protomedetera singaporensis

Scientific classification
- Kingdom: Animalia
- Phylum: Arthropoda
- Class: Insecta
- Order: Diptera
- Family: Dolichopodidae
- Subfamily: Medeterinae
- Genus: Protomedetera; Tang, Grootaert & Yang, 2018

Type species
- Protomedetera singaporensis Grootaert & Tang, 2018

= Protomedetera =

Genus of flies

Protomedetera is a genus of flies in the family Dolichopodidae. The genus contains four species, and is found in Papua New Guinea, Singapore and Malaysia.

The generic name is a combination of proto and Medetera, referring to the genus looking like a small and simplified Medetera.

== Species ==
- Protomedetera biconvexa Tang, Grootaert & Yang, 2018 – Papua New Guinea, Malaysia
- Protomedetera biseta Tang, Grootaert & Yang, 2018 – Papua New Guinea
- Protomedetera glabra Tang, Grootaert & Yang, 2018 – Papua New Guinea
- Protomedetera singaporensis Grootaert & Tang, 2018 – Singapore
