= Palaeoargyra =

Palaeoargyra Temporal range: Eocene (Priabonian), 37.2–33.9 Ma

Scientific classification
- Kingdom: Animalia
- Phylum: Arthropoda
- Class: Insecta
- Order: Diptera
- Family: Dolichopodidae
- Subfamily: Diaphorinae
- Genus: †Palaeoargyra; Meunier, 1895

Type species
- Palaeoargyra dytei (= Argyra mutabilis Meunier, 1907) Evenhuis, 1994

Species
- Palaeoargyra mutabilis (Meunier, 1907); Palaeoargyra planipedia (Meunier, 1907)

Extinct genus of flies

Palaeoargyra is an extinct genus of flies in the family Dolichopodidae, known from Baltic amber. It contains two described species, Palaeoargyra mutabilis and Palaeoargyra planipedia. It was originally proposed as a subgenus of Argyra, but was later considered a separate genus.

No type species had been designated for the genus until 1994, when Neal Evenhuis described P. dytei. However, in 2014, Igor Grichanov found that the genus had apparently been proposed for Argyra mutabilis Meunier, 1907, and that P. dytei was a synonym of this species.

In 2024, the genus was expanded to include a second species, Palaeoargyra planipedia (Meunier, 1907), formerly placed in Anepsiomyia.
