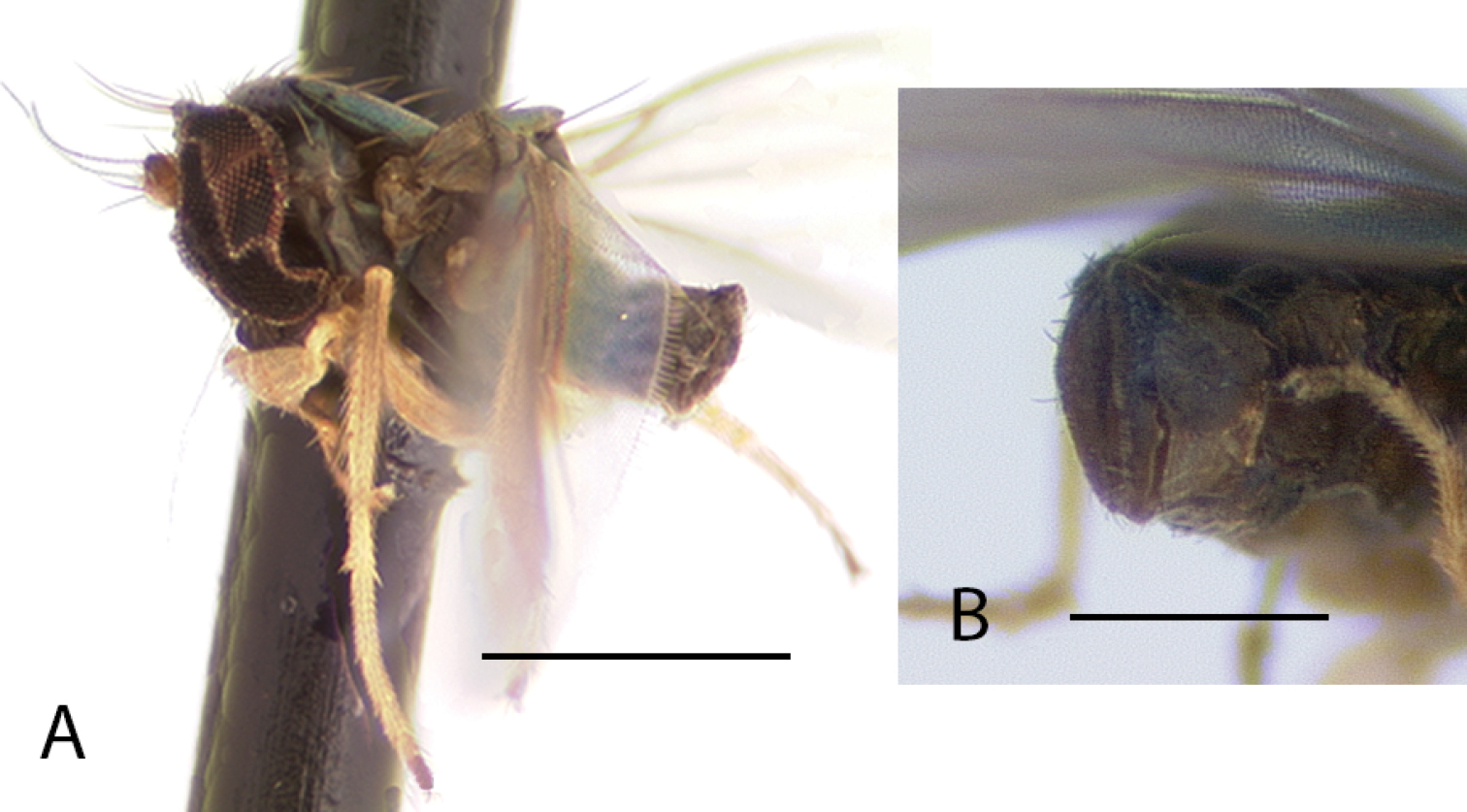
- Cryptopygiella musaphila Robinson, male A habitus, left lateral B tip of abdomen showing opening that encloses postabdomen, right lateral. Scale bars: 0.5 mm (A), 0.25 mm (B).

Scientific classification
- Kingdom: Animalia
- Phylum: Arthropoda
- Clade: Pancrustacea
- Class: Insecta
- Order: Diptera
- Family: Dolichopodidae
- Subfamily: Medeterinae
- Genus: Cryptopygiella; Robinson, 1975
- Species: C. musaphila

Binomial name
- Cryptopygiella musaphila Robinson, 1975

= Cryptopygiella =

Genus of flies

Cryptopygiella is a genus of flies in the family Dolichopodidae. It contains only one species, Cryptopygiella musaphila. The species is endemic to the Leeward Antilles of the Caribbean, where it has been recorded from the islands of Dominica and Montserrat. It is generally seen on the leaves of banana and Heliconia plants. It is a very small species growing to length of 1.2 mm (0.047 in), and has a bluish-green thorax and abdomen, glossy blue-green face, and yellow legs and antennae.

== Taxonomy ==
Cryptopygiella musaphila was formally described in 1975 by the American entomologist Harold E. Robinson based on an adult male specimen collected from the La Ronde River in Dominica. Robinson erected the genus Cryptopygiella in the same paper describing the species to accommodate it. It is closely related to the genus Dominicomyia.

== Description ==
Cryptopygiella musaphila is a very small fly, growing to a length of 1.2 mm (0.047 in) and has wings 1.3 mm (0.051 in) long. It has a bluish-green thorax and abdomen with yellow legs. Its head has a glossy blue-green face and brown palps and setae, while the antennae are yellow.

== Distribution and habitat ==
Cryptopygiella musaphila is endemic to the Leeward Antilles of the Caribbean, where it has been recorded from the islands of Dominica and Montserrat. On Dominica, it is known from the La Ronde River, Rosalie River, Clarke Hall, Springfield Estate, and South Chiltern Estate. On Montserrat, it is known from Bottomless Ghaut and the Big River, and seems to only be found in deep ghauts. It is generally seen on the leaves of banana and Heliconia plants.
