= Corindia =

Scientific classification
- Kingdom: Animalia
- Phylum: Arthropoda
- Clade: Pancrustacea
- Class: Insecta
- Order: Diptera
- Family: Dolichopodidae
- Subfamily: Medeterinae
- Genus: Corindia; Bickel, 1986

Type species
- Corindia major Bickel, 1986

Genus of flies

Corindia is a genus of flies in the family Dolichopodidae. It is known mainly from the Afrotropical and Australasian realms, with a single species from the Palaearctic realm and an undescribed species also known from the Neotropical realm. The genus was first described in 1986 by Daniel J. Bickel, who originally considered it to be the sister group of the genus Thrypticus. Bickel later suggested that Corindia may represent a plesiomorphic and paraphyletic assemblage from which Thrypticus arose.

In Australia, adults of the genus are often found on smooth-barked eucalypt trees, and display a stance similar to that of Medetera. The genus is named after Corindi, a geographical place name of aboriginal origin on the New South Wales northern coast.

== Species ==
Australasian realm:

- Corindia amieuensis Bickel, 2014 – New Caledonia
- Corindia capricornis Bickel, 1986 – Australia (Queensland, Western Australia)
- Corindia collessi Bickel, 1986 – Australia (Queensland, Western Australia, Northern Territory)
- Corindia cooloola Bickel, 1986 – Australia (Queensland: Cooloola National Park)
- Corindia flaviscuta Bickel, 2014 – New Caledonia
- Corindia gascoynensis Bickel, 2013 – Australia (Western Australia: near Gascoyne River)
- Corindia major Bickel, 1986 – Australia (New South Wales, Queensland, Tasmania, Western Australia)
- Corindia minor Bickel, 1986 – Australia (New South Wales)
- Corindia mulleri Bickel, 2014 – Papua New Guinea (New Ireland)
- Corindia nigricornis Bickel, 1986 – Australia (New South Wales, Queensland)
- Corindia robensis Bickel, 1986 – Australia (South Australia: Little Dip Conservation Park)
- Corindia torresiana Bickel, 1986 – Australia (Torres Strait Islands: Moa Island)
- Corindia trudis Bickel, 1986 – Australia (New South Wales)

Afrotropical realm:

- Corindia danielssoni Grichanov, 1998 – Gambia, DR Congo (Garamba National Park)
- Corindia demoulini Grichanov, 2000 – DR Congo (Garamba National Park)
- Corindia saegeri Grichanov, 1998 – DR Congo (Garamba National Park), Gabon, Namibia (Bwabwata National Park)
- Corindia verschureni Grichanov, 1998 – DR Congo (Garamba National Park)

Palaearctic realm:

- Corindia viridis (Parent, 1932) – France, Germany, Israel, Netherlands, Turkey, United Kingdom
