= Grootaertia =

Scientific classification
- Kingdom: Animalia
- Phylum: Arthropoda
- Class: Insecta
- Order: Diptera
- Family: Dolichopodidae
- Subfamily: Medeterinae
- Genus: Grootaertia; Grichanov, 1999

Type species
- Grootaertia kuznetsovi Grichanov, 1999

Genus of flies

Grootaertia is a genus of flies in the family Dolichopodidae from southern Africa. It is close in appearance to the genus Paramedetera. The genus is named after the Belgian entomologist Patrick Grootaert.

== Species ==
- Grootaertia anomalipennis Grichanov, 1999 – South Africa (Western Cape)
- Grootaertia anomalopyga Grichanov, 1999 – South Africa (Western Cape)
- Grootaertia asymmetrica Grichanov, 1999 – South Africa (Western Cape)
- Grootaertia bistylata Grichanov, 1999 – South Africa (Western Cape)
- Grootaertia brevipennis Grichanov, 2000 – South Africa (Western Cape)
- Grootaertia irwini Grichanov, 2000 – South Africa (Western Cape)
- Grootaertia kuznetsovi Grichanov, 1999 – South Africa (Western Cape, Eastern Cape)
- Grootaertia skorpionensis Grichanov, Kirk-Spriggs & Grootaert, 2006 – southern Namibia
