= Dolichophorus =

Scientific classification
- Kingdom: Animalia
- Phylum: Arthropoda
- Class: Insecta
- Order: Diptera
- Family: Dolichopodidae
- Subfamily: Medeterinae
- Tribe: Medeterini
- Genus: Dolichophorus; Lichtwardt, 1902

Type species
- Dolichophorus kerteszi Lichtwardt, 1902

Genus of flies

Dolichophorus is a genus of flies in the family Dolichopodidae. It includes eight species distributed in the Palaearctic and Afrotropical realms. The adults have a metallic green, green-black or blue-black body coloring, with some pruinescence.

Revisions of the genus Medetera by Bickel in 1985 and 1987 suggested that Dolichophorus is derived from Medetera (rendering Medetera paraphyletic) and is closely related to the Medetera aberrans and Medetera melanesiana species groups. This was confirmed by a 2011 molecular phylogenetic analysis of Medetera and related genera.

== Species ==
- Dolichophorus caucasicus Grichanov, 2009 – Azerbaijan (Lankaran)
- Dolichophorus friedmani Grichanov, 2009 – Madagascar
- Dolichophorus hamatus (Parent, 1936) – DR Congo
- Dolichophorus immaculatus Parent, 1944 – China
- Dolichophorus kerteszi Lichtwardt, 1902 – Europe
- Dolichophorus luteoscutatus (Parent, 1936) – DR Congo, Tanzania, Ivory Coast, Sierra Leone
- Dolichophorus madagascariensis Grichanov, 2009 – Madagascar
- Dolichophorus manukyani Grichanov, 2024 – Madagascar
