= Argyra flavipes =

Scientific classification
- Kingdom: Animalia
- Phylum: Arthropoda
- Class: Insecta
- Order: Diptera
- Family: Dolichopodidae
- Genus: Argyra
- Species: A. flavipes

Binomial name
- Argyra flavipes Van Duzee, 1925

Species of fly

Argyra flavipes is a species of long-legged fly in the family Dolichopodidae.
