= Palaeosystenus =

Palaeosystenus Temporal range: Upper Eocene–Lower Oligocene

Scientific classification
- Kingdom: Animalia
- Phylum: Arthropoda
- Class: Insecta
- Order: Diptera
- Family: Dolichopodidae
- Subfamily: Medeterinae
- Tribe: Systenini
- Genus: †Palaeosystenus; Grichanov, Negrobov & Selivanova, 2014
- Species: †P. succinorum

Binomial name
- †Palaeosystenus succinorum (Meunier, 1907)

Synonyms
- Argyra succinorum (Meunier, 1907); Porphyrops succinorum Meunier, 1907

Extinct genus of flies

Palaeosystenus is an extinct genus of flies in the family Dolichopodidae, known from Baltic amber. It contains only one species, Palaeosystenus succinorum.
