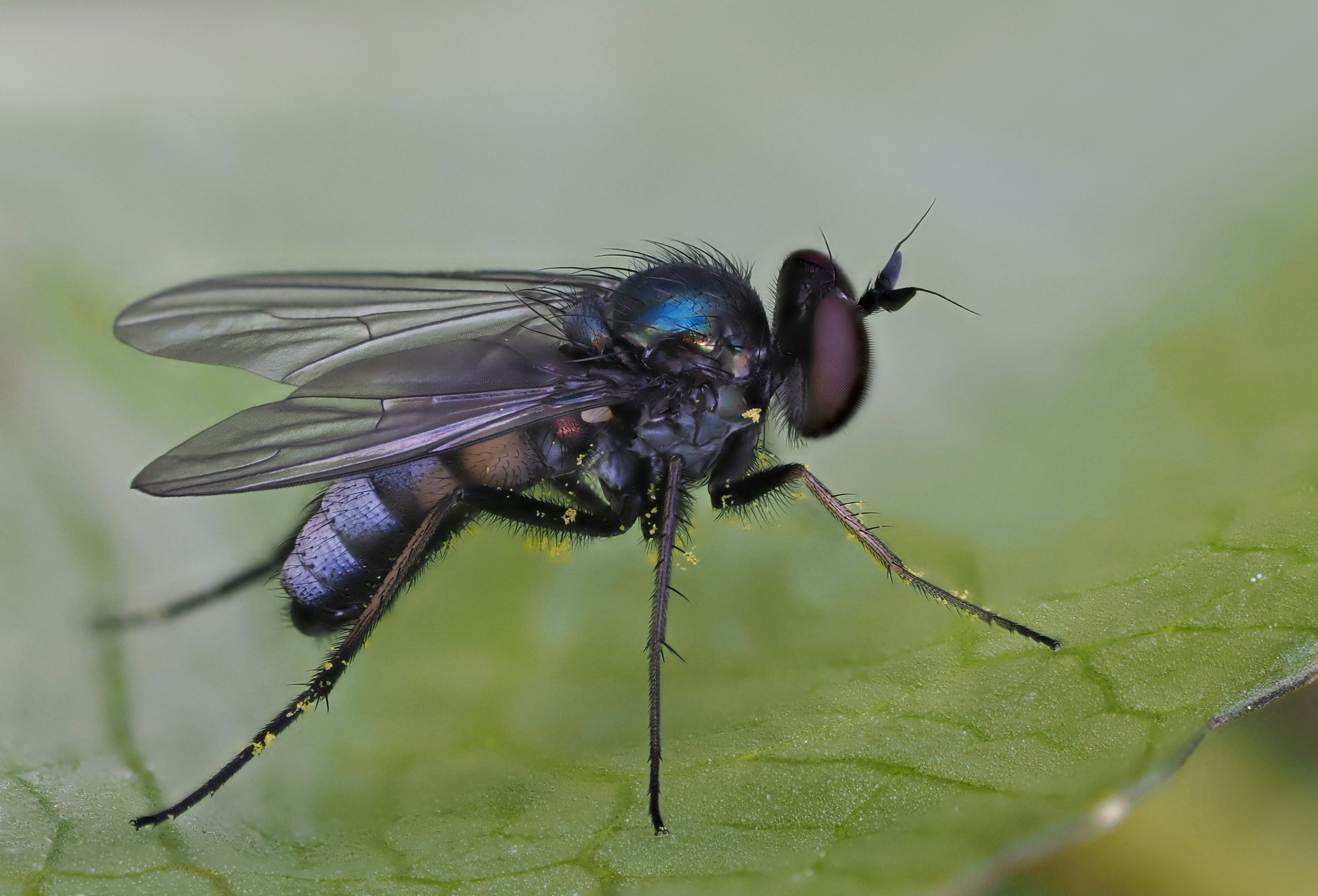
- Argyra diaphana Belgium

Scientific classification
- Kingdom: Animalia
- Phylum: Arthropoda
- Class: Insecta
- Order: Diptera
- Family: Dolichopodidae
- Subfamily: Diaphorinae
- Tribe: Argyrini
- Genus: Argyra
- Species: A. diaphana

Binomial name
- Argyra diaphana (Fabricius, 1775)

Synonyms
- Argyra hirtipes (Curtis, 1835); Argyra ludea (Harris, 1776); Argyra versicolor (Meigen, 1824); Dolichopus pellucens Fallén, 1823; Musca diaphana Fabricius, 1775; Musca ludea Harris, 1776; Porphyrops hirtipes Curtis, 1835; Porphyrops versicolor Meigen, 1824

= Argyra diaphana =

Species of fly

Argyra diaphana is a species of fly in the family Dolichopodidae. It is distributed in Europe, except for the south.
