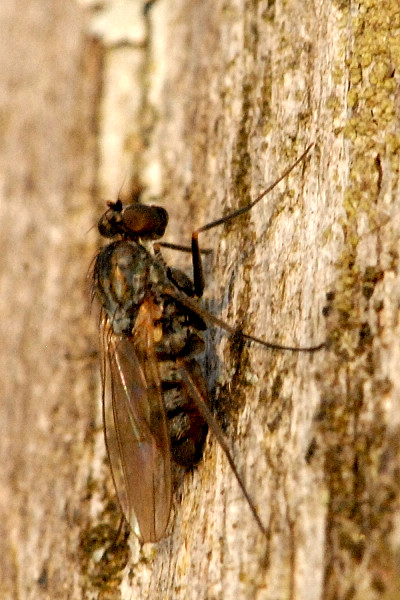
- Medetera jacula

Scientific classification
- Kingdom: Animalia
- Phylum: Arthropoda
- Class: Insecta
- Order: Diptera
- Family: Dolichopodidae
- Subfamily: Medeterinae; Lioy, 1864

Genera
- See text

Synonyms
- Systeninae Robinson, 1970

= Medeterinae =

Subfamily of flies

Medeterinae is a subfamily of flies in the family Dolichopodidae.

== Genera ==
- Atlatlia Bickel, 1986
- Cryptopygiella Robinson, 1975
- Dominicomyia Robinson, 1975
- †Eridanomyia Bickel in Bickel & Martin, 2025
- Grootaertia Grichanov, 1999
- Hurleyella Runyon & Robinson, 2010 (subfamily incertae sedis)
- †Kashubia Bickel in Bickel & Martin, 2025
- †Medeterites Grichanov, 2010
- Microchrysotus Robinson, 1964
- Microcyrtura Robinson, 1964
- Micromedetera Robinson, 1975
- Papallacta Bickel, 2006
- Pharcoura Bickel, 2007
- Pindaia Bickel, 2014
- †Plesiomedetera Grichanov, 2024
- Protomedetera Tang, Grootaert & Yang, 2018
- †Salishomyia Bickel, 2019
- Tribe Medeterini Lioy, 1864
  - Asioligochaetus Negrobov, 1966 (sometimes a synonym of Medetera)
  - Craterophorus Lamb, 1921
  - Cyrturella Collin, 1952
  - Demetera Grichanov, 2011 (= Medetera melanesiana species group)
  - Dolichophorus Lichtwardt, 1902
  - Medetera Fischer von Waldheim, 1819
  - Medeterella Grichanov, 2011 (= Medetera salomonis species group)
  - Nikitella Grichanov, 2011
  - Paramedetera Grootaert & Meuffels, 1997
  - Saccopheronta Becker, 1914 (= Medetera aberrans species group)
- Tribe Systenini Robinson, 1970
  - Euxiphocerus Parent, 1935
  - †Palaeosystenus Grichanov, Negrobov & Selivanova, 2014
  - †Systenites Grichanov, Negrobov & Selivanova, 2014
  - Systenomorphus Grichanov, 2010
  - Systenoneurus Grichanov, 2010
  - Systenus Loew, 1857
- Tribe Thrypticini Negrobov, 1986
  - Corindia Bickel, 1986
  - †Paleothrypticus Ngô-Muller, Garrouste & Nel, 2020
  - Thrypticus Gerstäcker, 1864
- Tribe Udzungwomyiini Grichanov, 2019
  - Cameroonomiya Grichanov, 2024
  - Maipomyia Bickel, 2004
  - Neomedetera Zhu, Yang & Grootaert, 2007
  - Udzungwomyia Grichanov, 2018
