= Argyra albicans =

Scientific classification
- Kingdom: Animalia
- Phylum: Arthropoda
- Class: Insecta
- Order: Diptera
- Family: Dolichopodidae
- Subfamily: Diaphorinae
- Tribe: Argyrini
- Genus: Argyra
- Species: A. albicans

Binomial name
- Argyra albicans Loew, 1861

Species of fly

Argyra albicans is a species of long-legged fly in the family Dolichopodidae.
