= Argyra auricollis =

Scientific classification
- Kingdom: Animalia
- Phylum: Arthropoda
- Class: Insecta
- Order: Diptera
- Family: Dolichopodidae
- Genus: Argyra
- Species: A. auricollis

Binomial name
- Argyra auricollis (Meigen, 1824)

Synonyms
- Dolichopus pellucens "var. β" Fallén, 1823; Porphyrops auricollis Meigen, 1824

Species of fly

Argyra auricollis is a species of fly in the family Dolichopodidae. It is found in the Palearctic.
