= Asioligochaetus =

Scientific classification
- Kingdom: Animalia
- Phylum: Arthropoda
- Class: Insecta
- Order: Diptera
- Family: Dolichopodidae
- Subfamily: Medeterinae
- Tribe: Medeterini
- Genus: Asioligochaetus; Negrobov, 1966
- Species: A. vlasovi

Binomial name
- Asioligochaetus vlasovi (Stackelberg, 1937)

Synonyms
- Oligochaetus vlasovi Stackelberg, 1937

Genus of flies

Asioligochaetus is a disputed genus of flies in the family Dolichopodidae. It contains only one species, Asioligochaetus vlasovi, which is distributed in Central Asia. Asioligochaetus was originally proposed as a subgenus of Medetera by Oleg Negrobov in 1966. In Bickel (1985)'s revision of the Nearctic Medetera species, Asioligochaetus was treated as a synonym of Medetera, with the only species (M. vlasovi) included as a member of the petulca species group. Alternatively, because of its peculiar combination of characters, Asioligochaetus was raised to genus rank by Igor Grichanov in 2009.
