= Demetera =

Scientific classification
- Kingdom: Animalia
- Phylum: Arthropoda
- Class: Insecta
- Order: Diptera
- Family: Dolichopodidae
- Subfamily: Medeterinae
- Tribe: Medeterini
- Genus: Demetera; Grichanov, 2011

Type species
- Medetera melanesiana Bickel, 1987

Genus of flies

Demetera is a genus of flies in the family Dolichopodidae. It contains eight species formerly included in Medetera in the M. melanesiana species group. The species are found in the Afrotropical, Oriental and Australasian regions. According to Naglis and Bickel (2012), it was unwarranted to establish a separate genus for this group of species.

== Species ==
- Demetera demeteri (Grichanov, 1997)
- Demetera kokodensis (Bickel, 1987)
- Demetera macalpinei (Bickel, 1987)
- Demetera malaisei (Bickel, 1987)
- Demetera melanesiana (Bickel, 1987)
- Demetera morobensis (Bickel, 1987)
- Demetera niuginiensis (Bickel, 1987)
- Demetera rhetheura (Bickel, 1987)
