= Maipomyia =

Scientific classification
- Kingdom: Animalia
- Phylum: Arthropoda
- Class: Insecta
- Order: Diptera
- Family: Dolichopodidae
- Subfamily: Medeterinae
- Tribe: Udzungwomyiini
- Genus: Maipomyia; Bickel, 2004

Type species
- Maipomyia insolita Bickel, 2004

Genus of flies

Maipomyia is a genus of flies in the family Dolichopodidae from the Chilean Central Valley. The genus is named after the Maipo River. It is placed in the subfamily Medeterinae, tribe Udzungwomyiini.

== Species ==
- Maipomyia insolita Bickel, 2004
- Maipomyia velata Bickel, 2004
