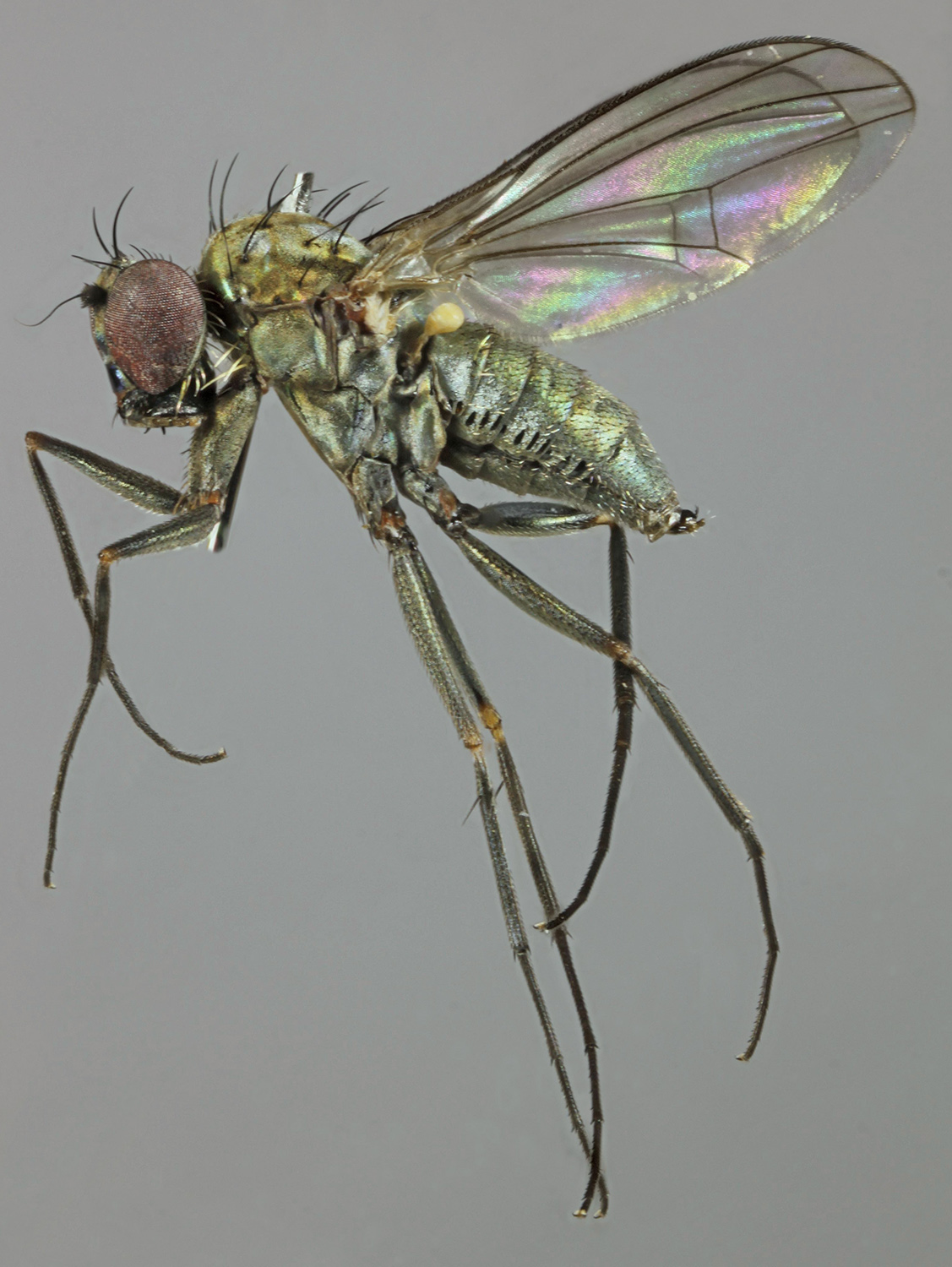
- Medetera petrophiloides North Wales

Scientific classification
- Kingdom: Animalia
- Phylum: Arthropoda
- Class: Insecta
- Order: Diptera
- Family: Dolichopodidae
- Genus: Medetera
- Species: M. petrophiloides

Binomial name
- Medetera petrophiloides Parent, 1925

= Medetera petrophiloides =

Species of fly

Medetera petrophiloides is a species of fly in the family Dolichopodidae. It is found in the Palearctic.

Medetera petrophiloides was treated as a junior synonym of Medetera petrophila by Grichanov (2002), but Negrobov (2010) gives arguments for retaining it as a valid species.
