= Pharcoura =

Scientific classification
- Kingdom: Animalia
- Phylum: Arthropoda
- Class: Insecta
- Order: Diptera
- Family: Dolichopodidae
- Subfamily: Medeterinae
- Genus: Pharcoura; Bickel, 2007

Type species
- Pharcoura newthayorum Bickel, 2007

Genus of flies

Pharcoura is a genus of flies in the family Dolichopodidae from Chile. It is the first genus in the subfamily Medeterinae to be described from Nothofagus forests.

The generic name is a combination of the Greek words pharkis (wrinkle) and oura (tail).

== Species ==
- Pharcoura biobio Bickel, 2007
- Pharcoura nahuelbuta Bickel, 2007
- Pharcoura newthayorum Bickel, 2007
