= Euxiphocerus =

Scientific classification
- Kingdom: Animalia
- Phylum: Arthropoda
- Class: Insecta
- Order: Diptera
- Family: Dolichopodidae
- Subfamily: Medeterinae
- Tribe: Systenini
- Genus: Euxiphocerus; Parent, 1935

Type species
- Euxiphocerus wulfi Parent, 1935

Genus of flies

Euxiphocerus is a genus of flies in the family Dolichopodidae from the Afrotropical realm. It was originally placed in the subfamily Rhaphiinae, but some authors now place it in Medeterinae, tribe Systenini.

== Species ==
The genus contains three species:

- Euxiphocerus disjunctus Grichanov, 2009 – South Africa (Eastern Cape), Namibia
- Euxiphocerus savannensis Grichanov, 2009
  - Euxiphocerus savannensis capensis Grichanov, 2009 – South Africa (Eastern Cape)
  - Euxiphocerus savannensis savannensis Grichanov, 2009 – Namibia
- Euxiphocerus wulfi Parent, 1935 – DR Congo
