= Udzungwomyia =

Scientific classification
- Kingdom: Animalia
- Phylum: Arthropoda
- Class: Insecta
- Order: Diptera
- Family: Dolichopodidae
- Subfamily: Medeterinae
- Tribe: Udzungwomyiini
- Genus: Udzungwomyia; Grichanov, 2018

Type species
- Udzungwomyia morogoro Grichanov, 2018

Genus of flies

Udzungwomyia is a genus of flies in the family Dolichopodidae, containing six species from Africa. All known species were found in mountainous habitats at a height of about 2000 m above sea level. The generic name comes from the Udzungwa Mountains National Park, where the type species (Udzungwomyia morogoro) was collected. The other five species were found along the Drakensberg escarpment in southern Africa. The genus is placed in the subfamily Medeterinae, tribe Udzungwomyiini.

== Species ==
Six species are included in the genus:

- Udzungwomyia brevitarsa Grichanov, 2024 – South Africa: KwaZulu-Natal
- Udzungwomyia lundeans Grichanov, 2024 – South Africa: Eastern Cape
- Udzungwomyia maseru Grichanov, 2024 – Lesotho
- Udzungwomyia morogoro Grichanov, 2018 – Tanzania
- Udzungwomyia simoni Grichanov, 2019 – South Africa: Limpopo
- Udzungwomyia spinitarsa Grichanov, 2024 – South Africa: KwaZulu-Natal
