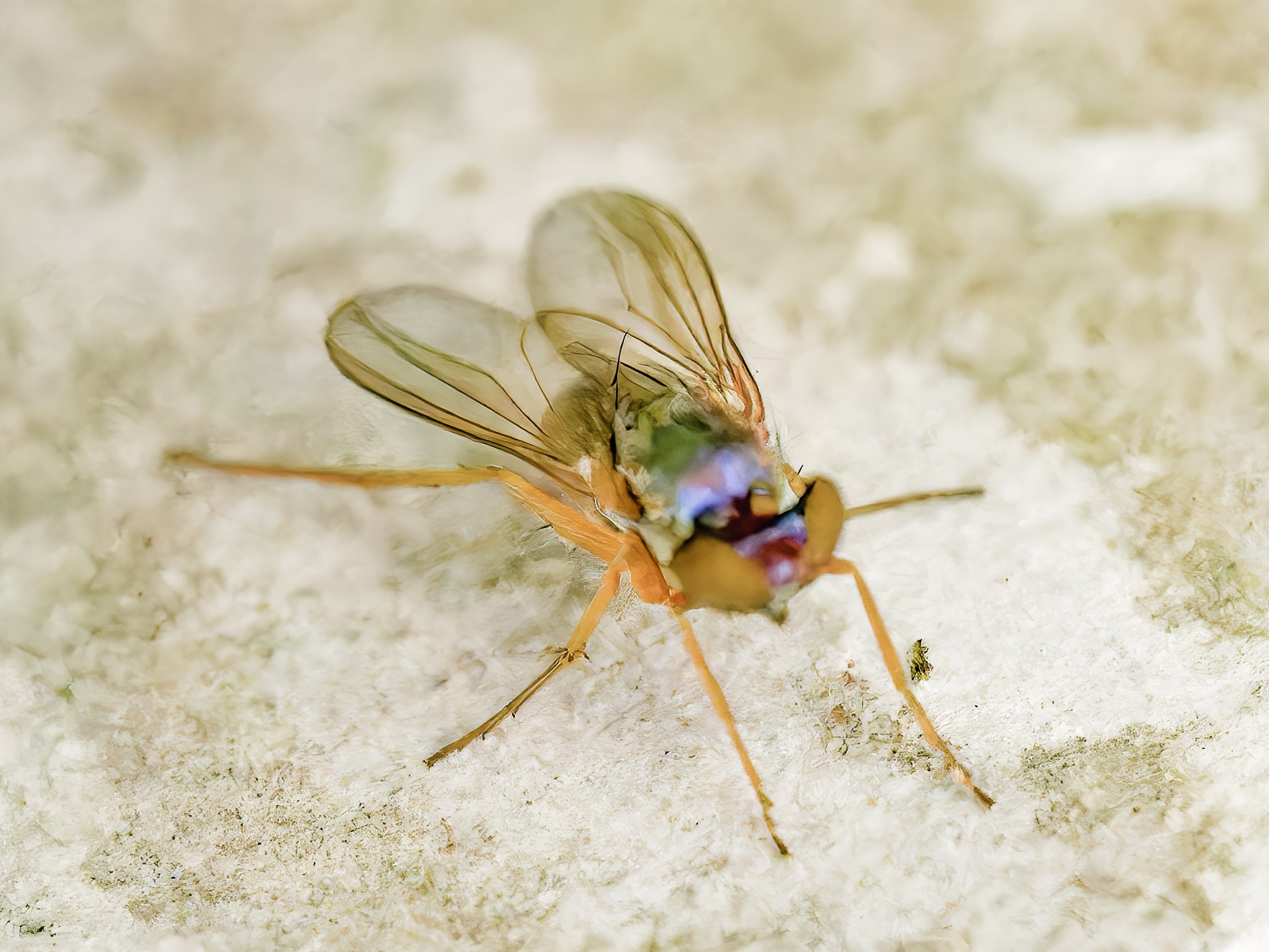

Scientific classification
- Kingdom: Animalia
- Phylum: Arthropoda
- Class: Insecta
- Order: Diptera
- Family: Dolichopodidae
- Genus: Medetera
- Species: M. aberrans

Binomial name
- Medetera aberrans Wheeler, 1899

Synonyms
- Medeterus flavicosta Van Duzee, 1932; Medeterus lobatus Van Duzee, 1914

= Medetera aberrans =

Species of fly

Medetera aberrans is a species of long-legged fly in the family Dolichopodidae. It is found in eastern North America. Adults of the species are generally colored a metallic green, with yellow legs. Not much is known about the biology of the species, but adults have frequently been collected from wet grasslands or marshes.

In Bickel (1985)'s revision of the genus Medetera in the Nearctic realm, M. aberrans is included as a member of the aberrans species group. Alternatively, this species group has been treated as a separate genus, Saccopheronta.
