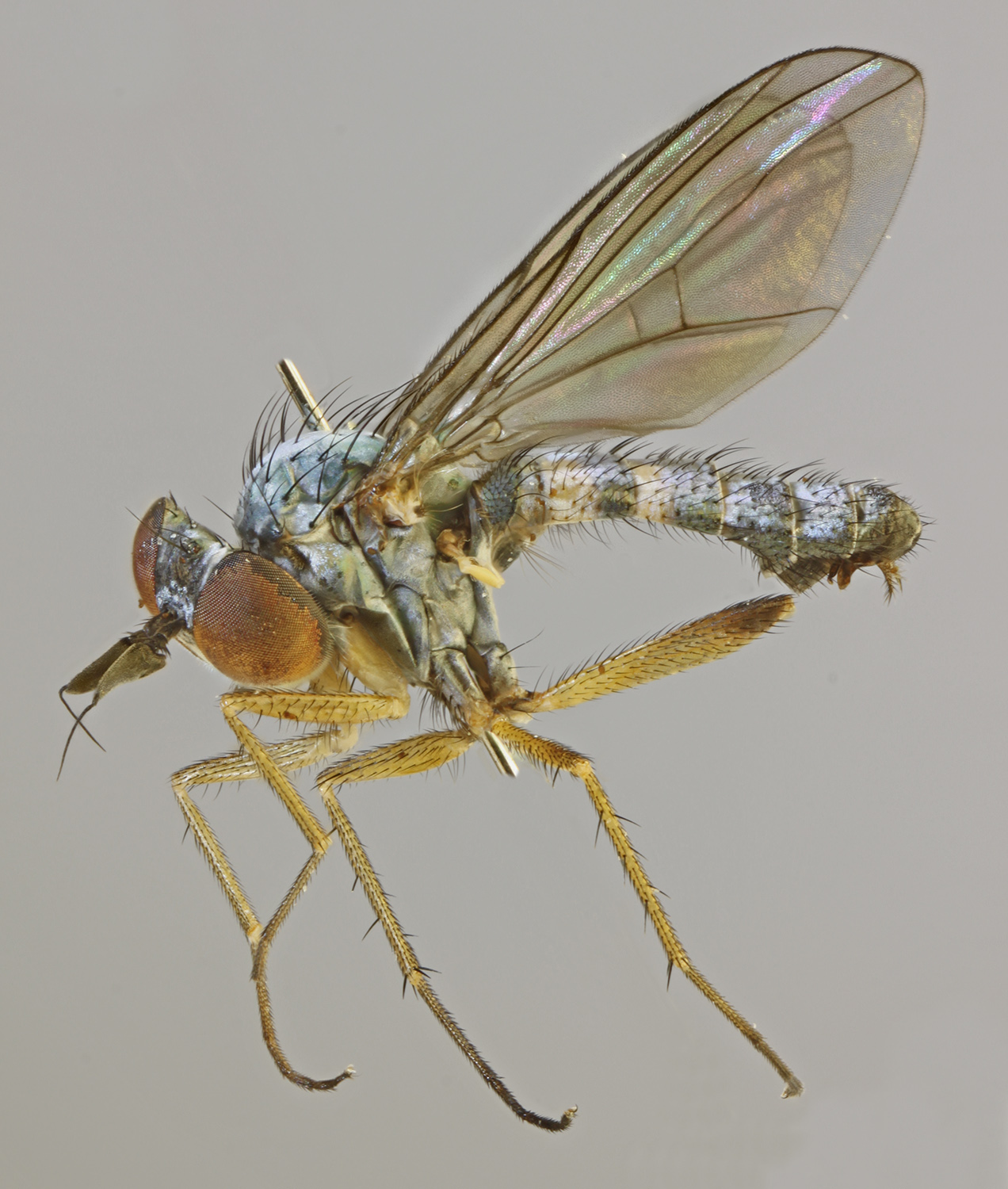
- Argyra perplexa male

Scientific classification
- Kingdom: Animalia
- Phylum: Arthropoda
- Class: Insecta
- Order: Diptera
- Family: Dolichopodidae
- Subfamily: Diaphorinae
- Tribe: Argyrini
- Genus: Argyra
- Species: A. perplexa

Binomial name
- Argyra perplexa Becker, 1918

= Argyra perplexa =

Species of fly

Argyra perplexa is a species of fly in the family Dolichopodidae. It is distributed in Northwestern Europe, Italy, Hungary and Portugal.
