= Systenites =

Systenites Temporal range: Upper Eocene–Lower Oligocene

Scientific classification
- Kingdom: Animalia
- Phylum: Arthropoda
- Clade: Pancrustacea
- Class: Insecta
- Order: Diptera
- Family: Dolichopodidae
- Subfamily: Medeterinae
- Tribe: Systenini
- Genus: †Systenites; Grichanov, Negrobov & Selivanova, 2014

Type species
- Porphyrops inclyta Meunier, 1907

Extinct genus of flies

Systenites is an extinct genus of flies in the family Dolichopodidae, known from Baltic amber.

== Species ==
The genus contains three species:

- Systenites argutus (Meunier, 1907)
- Systenites inclytus (Meunier, 1907)
- Systenites splendidus (Meunier, 1907)
