= Plesiomedetera =

Scientific classification
- Kingdom: Animalia
- Phylum: Arthropoda
- Clade: Pancrustacea
- Class: Insecta
- Order: Diptera
- Family: Dolichopodidae
- Subfamily: Medeterinae
- Genus: Plesiomedetera; Grichanov, 2024

Type species
- Medetera mustela Meunier, 1907

Extinct genus of flies

Plesiomedetera is an extinct genus of flies in the family Dolichopodidae, known from Baltic amber from the Eocene. It was established to house seven species that were described by Fernand Meunier between 1907 and 1908; five of them were originally placed in Medetera, and two of them were placed in Chrysotus.

== Species ==
- Plesiomedetera decora (Meunier, 1907) (= Chrysotus decorus Meunier, 1907)
- Plesiomedetera elegantula (Meunier, 1907) (= Medetera elegantula Meunier, 1907)
- Plesiomedetera flammea (Meunier, 1907) (= Medetera flammea Meunier, 1907)
- Plesiomedetera lasciva (Meunier, 1907) (= Medetera lasciva Meunier, 1907) (doubtful)
- Plesiomedetera lepida (Meunier, 1907) (= Chrysotus lepidus Meunier, 1907)
- Plesiomedetera mustela (Meunier, 1907) (= Medetera mustela Meunier, 1907)
- Plesiomedetera vana (Meunier, 1907) (= Medetera vana Meunier, 1907)
