= Thrypticus violaceus =

Scientific classification
- Domain: Eukaryota
- Kingdom: Animalia
- Phylum: Arthropoda
- Class: Insecta
- Order: Diptera
- Family: Dolichopodidae
- Genus: Thrypticus
- Species: T. violaceus

Binomial name
- Thrypticus violaceus Van Duzee, 1927

Synonyms
- Thrypticus setosus Robinson, 1964

Species of fly

Thrypticus violaceus is a species of long-legged fly in the family Dolichopodidae.
