= Argyra grata =

Scientific classification
- Kingdom: Animalia
- Phylum: Arthropoda
- Class: Insecta
- Order: Diptera
- Family: Dolichopodidae
- Genus: Argyra
- Species: A. grata

Binomial name
- Argyra grata Loew, 1857

Species of fly

Argyra grata is a species of fly in the family Dolichopodidae. It is found in the Palearctic.
