= Argyra argentina =

Scientific classification
- Kingdom: Animalia
- Phylum: Arthropoda
- Class: Insecta
- Order: Diptera
- Family: Dolichopodidae
- Subfamily: Diaphorinae
- Tribe: Argyrini
- Genus: Argyra
- Species: A. argentina

Binomial name
- Argyra argentina (Meigen, 1824)

Synonyms
- ?Musca semiargentata Donovan, 1795; Porphyrops argentina Meigen, 1824; Porphyrops geniculata Schummel, 1837

Species of fly

Argyra argentina is a species of fly in the family Dolichopodidae. It is found in the Palearctic.
