= Medetera apicalis =

Scientific classification
- Kingdom: Animalia
- Phylum: Arthropoda
- Class: Insecta
- Order: Diptera
- Family: Dolichopodidae
- Genus: Medetera
- Species: M. apicalis

Binomial name
- Medetera apicalis (Zetterstedt, 1843)

Synonyms
- Hydrophorus apicalis Zetterstedt, 1843; Medeterus aurivittatus Wheeler, 1899; Medeterus caerulescens Malloch, 1919; Medeterus distinctus Van Duzee, 1919; Medeterus frontalis Van Duzee, 1919; Medeterus bicolor Van Duzee, 1923 (nec Meigen, 1838); Medeterus parvus Van Duzee, 1923; Medeterus ciliatus Van Duzee, 1928; Medeterus simplicipes Curran, 1928; Medeterus venatus Curran, 1928; Medetera orbiculata Van Duzee, 1932; Medetera albiciliata Van Duzee, 1933; Medetera arctica Van Duzee, 1933

Species of fly

Medetera apicalis is a species of long-legged fly in the family Dolichopodidae. It is found in Europe and North America. This species is more common in old-growth forest habitats, where it can be found beneath bark or on the fruiting bodies of wood-decaying fungi such as Fomitopsis pinicola.
