= Nikitella =

Scientific classification
- Kingdom: Animalia
- Phylum: Arthropoda
- Class: Insecta
- Order: Diptera
- Family: Dolichopodidae
- Subfamily: Medeterinae
- Tribe: Medeterini
- Genus: Nikitella; Grichanov, 2011
- Species: N. vikhrevi

Binomial name
- Nikitella vikhrevi Grichanov, 2011

Genus of flies

Nikitella is a genus of flies in the family Dolichopodidae, found in Senegal. It contains only one species, Nikitella vikhrevi. Both the genus and species are named after the collector, Dr. Nikita Vikhrev.
