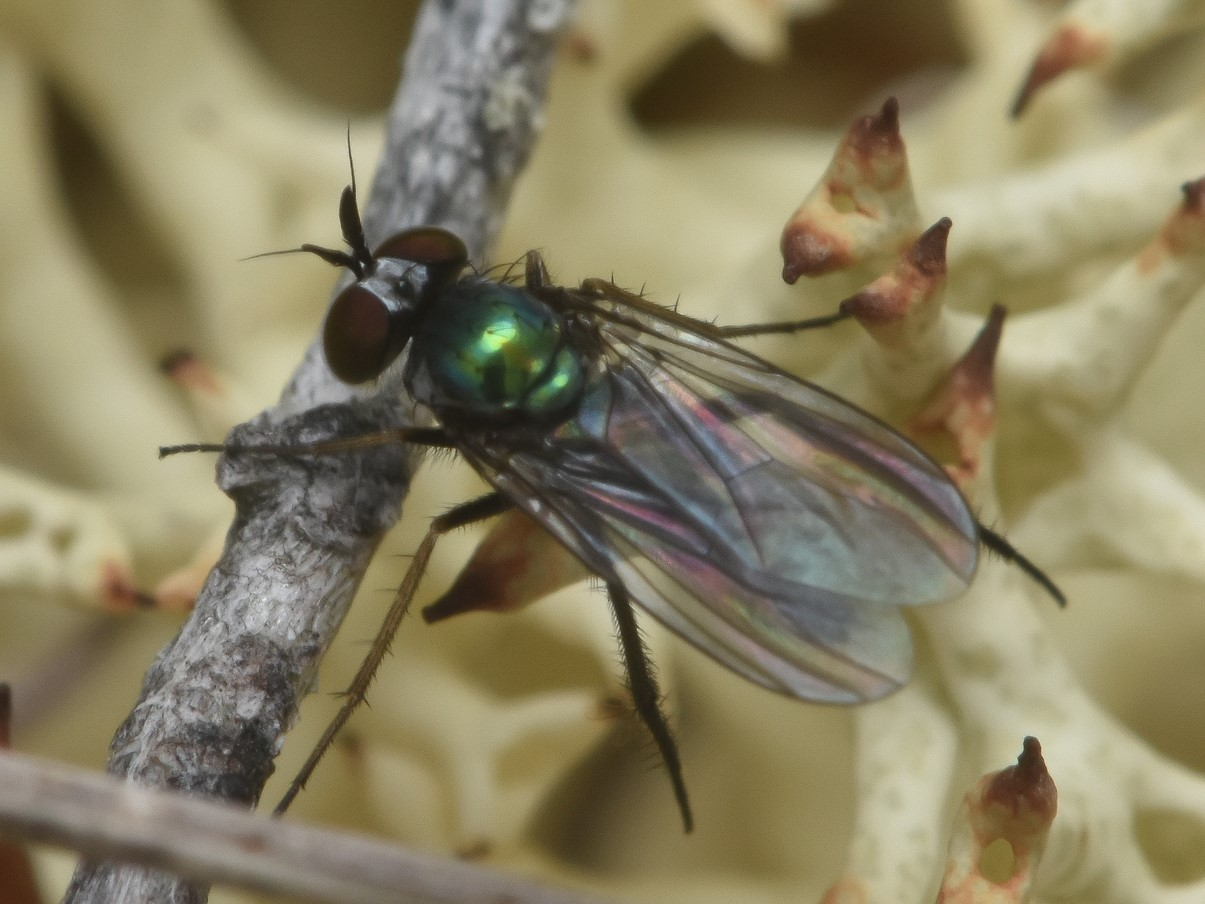

Scientific classification
- Kingdom: Animalia
- Phylum: Arthropoda
- Clade: Pancrustacea
- Class: Insecta
- Order: Diptera
- Family: Dolichopodidae
- Genus: Argyra
- Species: A. nigriventris

Binomial name
- Argyra nigriventris Van Duzee, 1925

= Argyra nigriventris =

Species of fly

Argyra nigriventris is a species of long-legged fly in the family Dolichopodidae.
