= Medeterella =

Scientific classification
- Kingdom: Animalia
- Phylum: Arthropoda
- Class: Insecta
- Order: Diptera
- Family: Dolichopodidae
- Subfamily: Medeterinae
- Tribe: Medeterini
- Genus: Medeterella; Grichanov, 2011

Type species
- Medetera salomonis Parent, 1941

Genus of flies

Medeterella is a genus of flies in the family Dolichopodidae. It contains nine species formerly included in Medetera in the M. salomonis species group. The species are found in the Afrotropical, Oriental and Australasian regions. According to Naglis and Bickel (2012), it was unwarranted to establish a separate genus for this group of species.

== Species ==
- Medeterella austrofemoralis (Bickel, 1987)
- Medeterella femoralis (Becker, 1922)
- Medeterella malayensis (Bickel, 1987)
- Medeterella mooneyensis (Bickel, 1987)
- Medeterella nigrohalterata (Parent, 1932)
- Medeterella olivacea (De Meijere, 1916)
- Medeterella pospelovi (Grichanov, 1997)
- Medeterella pseudofemoralis (Bickel, 1987)
- Medeterella salomonis (Parent, 1941)
