= Thrypticus willistoni =

Scientific classification
- Domain: Eukaryota
- Kingdom: Animalia
- Phylum: Arthropoda
- Class: Insecta
- Order: Diptera
- Family: Dolichopodidae
- Genus: Thrypticus
- Species: T. willistoni

Binomial name
- Thrypticus willistoni (Wheeler, 1890)

Synonyms
- Aphantotimus willistoni Wheeler, 1890

Species of fly

Thrypticus willistoni is a species of long-legged fly in the family Dolichopodidae.
