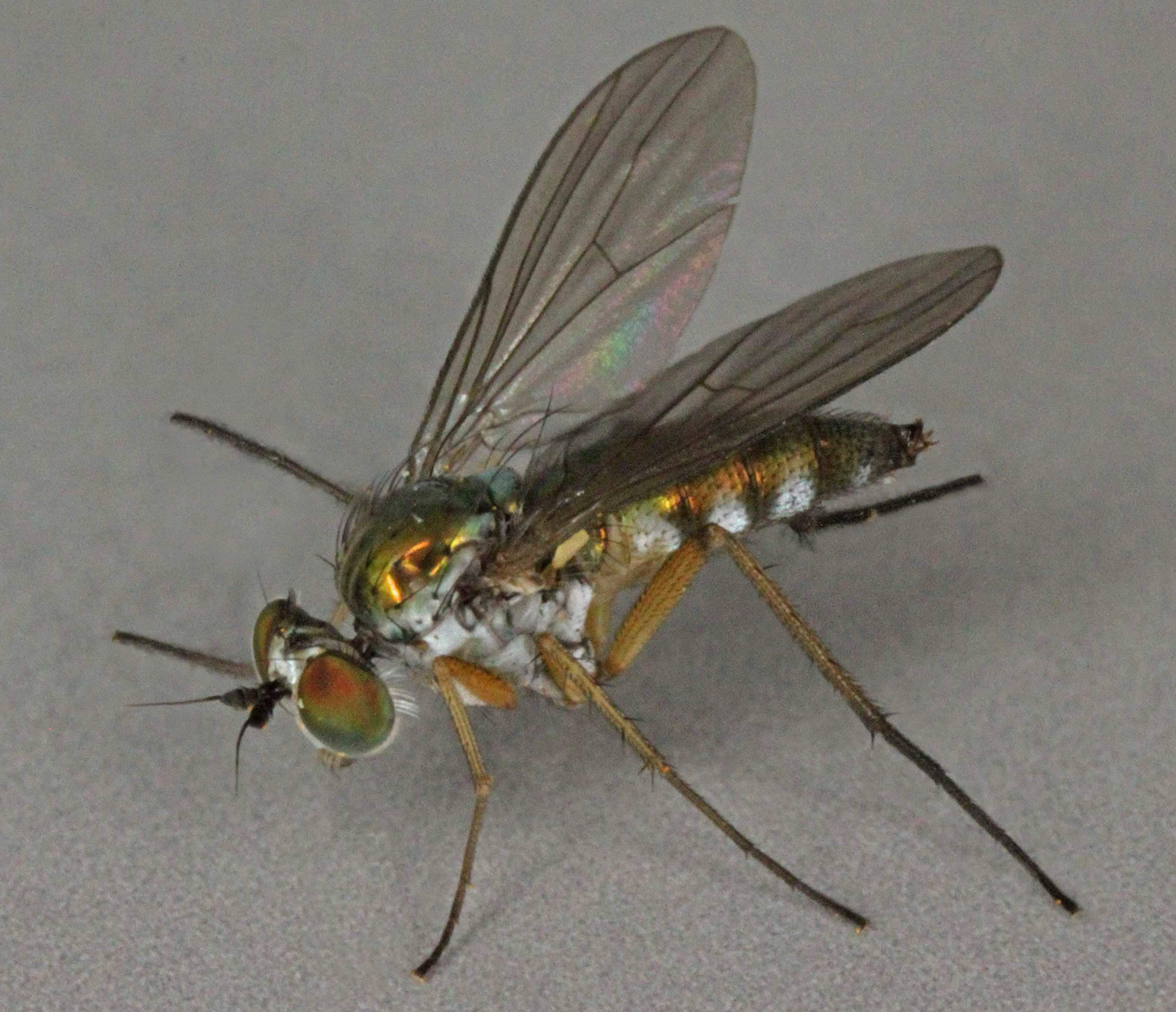
- Argyra argyria North Wales

Scientific classification
- Kingdom: Animalia
- Phylum: Arthropoda
- Class: Insecta
- Order: Diptera
- Family: Dolichopodidae
- Subfamily: Diaphorinae
- Tribe: Argyrini
- Genus: Argyra
- Species: A. argyria

Binomial name
- Argyra argyria (Meigen, 1824)

Synonyms
- Argyra argentata Macquart, 1834; Argyra argentella (Zetterstedt, 1843); Argyra discedens Parent, 1938; Argyra divergens Parent, 1926; Dolichopus argentatus (Macquart, 1834); Dolichopus argentella Zetterstedt, 1843; ?Dolichopus vividus Meigen, 1824; Porphyrops argyria Meigen, 1824

= Argyra argyria =

Species of fly

Argyra argyria is a species of fly in the family Dolichopodidae. It is distributed in Europe and North Africa.

== Distribution ==
Austria, Belarus, Belgium, Canary Islands, Corsica, Croatia, Czech Republic, Denmark, Finland, France, Germany, Hungary, Italy, Morocco, Norway, Poland, Portugal, Romania, Russia, Slovakia, Spain, Sweden, Switzerland, Netherlands, Ukraine, United Kingdom.
