= Medetera bistriata =

Scientific classification
- Kingdom: Animalia
- Phylum: Arthropoda
- Class: Insecta
- Order: Diptera
- Family: Dolichopodidae
- Genus: Medetera
- Species: M. bistriata

Binomial name
- Medetera bistriata Parent, 1929

Species of fly

Medetera bistriata is a species of longlegged fly in the family Dolichopodidae. It is widely distributed in North America, spanning from the pine forests of boreal Canada south to Honduras, and it is common in the pine forests of the Atlantic and Gulf costal plains. The larvae are predators of bark beetles in the genera Dendroctonus and Ips, and have been noted as important predators of the southern pine beetle, Dendroctonus frontalis.

In Bickel (1985)'s revision of the genus Medetera in the Nearctic realm, M. bistriata is included as a member of the signaticornis-pinicola species group.
