= Medetera arnaudi =

Scientific classification
- Kingdom: Animalia
- Phylum: Arthropoda
- Class: Insecta
- Order: Diptera
- Family: Dolichopodidae
- Genus: Medetera
- Species: M. arnaudi

Binomial name
- Medetera arnaudi Harmston, 1951

Species of fly

Medetera arnaudi is a species of long-legged fly in the family Dolichopodidae. It is known from the Central Valley and Coast Ranges of California. It is named after the entomologist Paul H. Arnaud, Jr., who collected the type specimens.

In Bickel (1985)'s revision of the genus Medetera in the Nearctic realm, M. arnaudi is included as a member of the diadema-veles species group.
