= Medeterites =

Medeterites Temporal range: Upper Eocene–Lower Oligocene

Scientific classification
- Kingdom: Animalia
- Phylum: Arthropoda
- Clade: Pancrustacea
- Class: Insecta
- Order: Diptera
- Family: Dolichopodidae
- Subfamily: Medeterinae
- Genus: †Medeterites; Grichanov, 2010

Type species
- Thrypticus molestus Meunier, 1907

Extinct genus of flies

Medeterites is an extinct genus of flies in the family Dolichopodidae, known from Baltic amber and Belorussian amber. It was originally established for one species, Medeterites molestus, formerly placed in the genus Thrypticus. In 2024, the genus was expanded to include four more species originally placed in the genera Thrypticus, Achalcus and Anepsiomyia. All five species were described by Fernand Meunier between 1907 and 1908.

== Species ==
- Medeterites atterraneus (Nazarov, 1994) (= Anepsiomyia atterranea Nazarov, 1994) – Belorussian amber
- Medeterites gestuosus (Meunier, 1907) (= Thrypticus gestuosus Meunier, 1907) – Baltic amber
- Medeterites gulosus (Meunier, 1907) (= Thrypticus gulosus Meunier, 1907) – Baltic amber
- Medeterites latipennis (Meunier, 1907) (= Achalcus latipennis Meunier, 1907) – Baltic amber
- Medeterites molestus (Meunier, 1907) (= Thrypticus molestus Meunier, 1907) – Baltic amber
