= Neomedetera =

Scientific classification
- Kingdom: Animalia
- Phylum: Arthropoda
- Class: Insecta
- Order: Diptera
- Family: Dolichopodidae
- Subfamily: Medeterinae
- Tribe: Udzungwomyiini
- Genus: Neomedetera; Zhu, Yang & Grootaert, 2007
- Species: N. membranacea

Binomial name
- Neomedetera membranacea Zhu, Yang & Grootaert, 2007

Genus of flies

Neomedetera is a genus of flies belonging to the family Dolichopodidae. It contains only a single species, Neomedetera membranacea, described from China. It is placed in the subfamily Medeterinae, tribe Udzungwomyiini.
