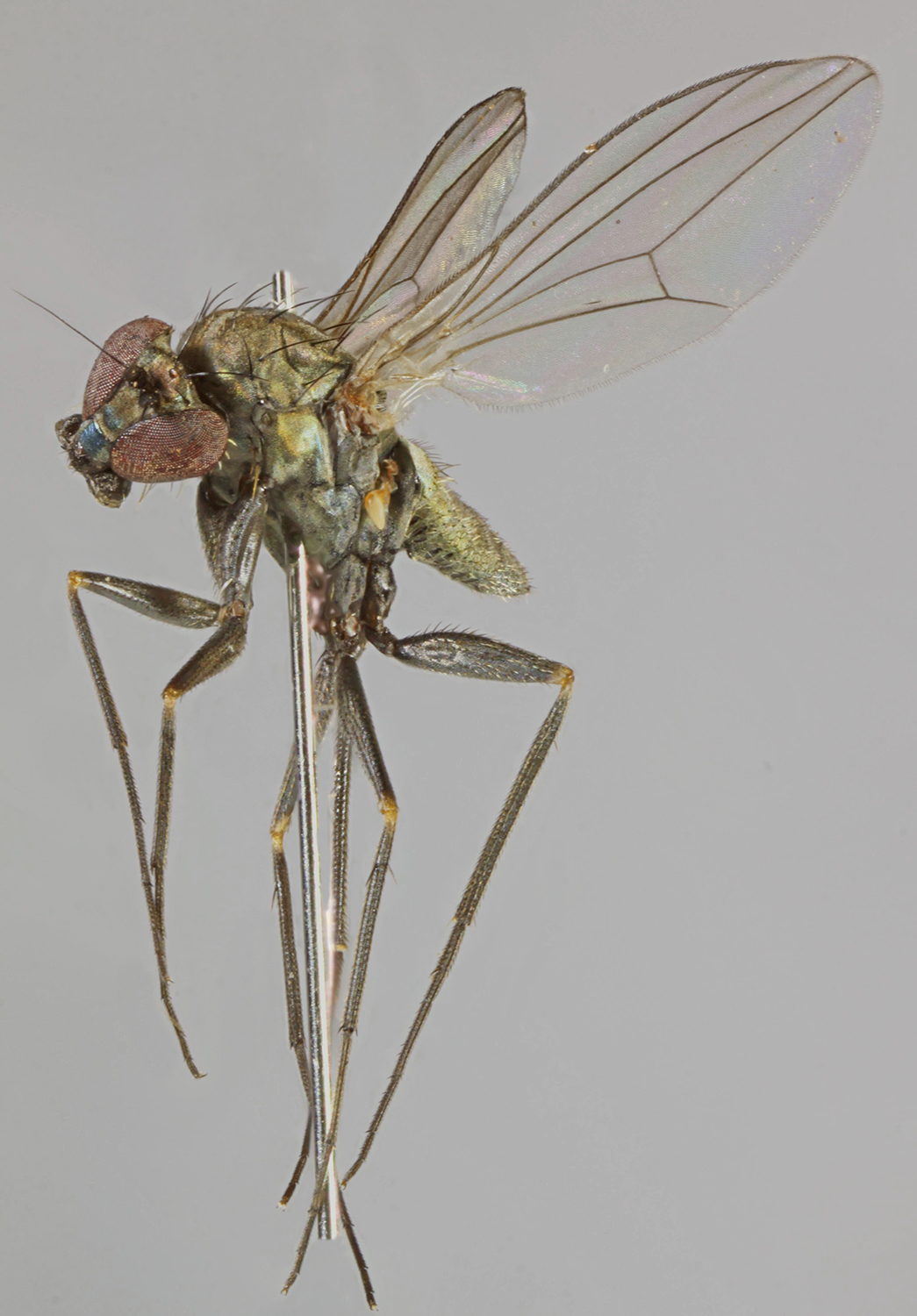
- Medetera truncorum North Wales

Scientific classification
- Kingdom: Animalia
- Phylum: Arthropoda
- Clade: Pancrustacea
- Class: Insecta
- Order: Diptera
- Family: Dolichopodidae
- Genus: Medetera
- Species: M. truncorum

Binomial name
- Medetera truncorum Meigen, 1824

= Medetera truncorum =

Species of fly

Medetera truncorum is a species of fly in the family Dolichopodidae. It is widely distributed in the Western Palaearctic. It also occurs in the Pacific Northwest in North America, where it may be an introduced species.

In Bickel (1985)'s revision of the genus Medetera in the Nearctic realm, M. truncorum is included as a member of the diadema-veles species group.
