= Craterophorus =

Scientific classification
- Kingdom: Animalia
- Phylum: Arthropoda
- Class: Insecta
- Order: Diptera
- Family: Dolichopodidae
- Subfamily: Medeterinae
- Genus: Craterophorus; Lamb, 1921

Type species
- Craterophorus mirus Lamb, 1921

Genus of flies

Craterophorus is a genus of flies in the family Dolichopodidae from the Afrotropical realm. It is endemic to the islands of the western Indian Ocean.

== Species ==
- Craterophorus currani Grichanov, 1998 – Mauritius
- Craterophorus mirabilis Lamb, 1922 – Seychelles
- Craterophorus mirus Lamb, 1921 – Seychelles
- Craterophorus parenti Grichanov, 1998 – Madagascar
- Craterophorus permirus Lamb, 1922 – Seychelles
