= Argyra elongata =

Scientific classification
- Kingdom: Animalia
- Phylum: Arthropoda
- Class: Insecta
- Order: Diptera
- Family: Dolichopodidae
- Genus: Argyra
- Species: A. elongata

Binomial name
- Argyra elongata (Zetterstedt, 1843)

Synonyms
- Dolichopus elongata Zetterstedt, 1843

Species of fly

Argyra elongata is a species of fly in the family Dolichopodidae. It is found in the Palearctic.
