= Saccopheronta =

Scientific classification
- Kingdom: Animalia
- Phylum: Arthropoda
- Class: Insecta
- Order: Diptera
- Family: Dolichopodidae
- Subfamily: Medeterinae
- Genus: Saccopheronta; Becker, 1914

Type species
- Saccopheronta nudipes Becker, 1914

Genus of flies

Saccopheronta is a genus of flies in the family Dolichopodidae. It is considered a synonym of Medetera by some authors (with its species treated as the Medetera aberrans group), and a valid genus by others.

== Species ==
- Saccopheronta aberrans (Wheeler, 1899)
- Saccopheronta abrupta (Van Duzee, 1919)
- Saccopheronta albitarsis (Van Duzee, 1931)
- Saccopheronta amplimanus (Van Duzee, 1931)
- Saccopheronta aperta Negrobov, Vanschuytbroeck & Grichanov, 1981
- Saccopheronta archboldi (Robinson, 1975)
- Saccopheronta arnaudi Negrobov, Vanschuytbroeck & Grichanov, 1981
- Saccopheronta bella (Van Duzee, 1929)
- Saccopheronta caffra (Curran, 1927)
- Saccopheronta dilatata (Becker, 1922)
- Saccopheronta excavata (Becker, 1922)
- Saccopheronta flabellifera (Becker, 1922)
- Saccopheronta flavides (Negrobov & Thuneberg, 1970)
- Saccopheronta fletcheri Grichanov, 1997
- Saccopheronta glabra Negrobov, Vanschuytbroeck & Grichanov, 1981
- Saccopheronta gomwa (Bickel, 1987)
- Saccopheronta hirsuticosta Parent, 1935
- Saccopheronta jamaicensis (Curran, 1928)
- Saccopheronta luzonensis (Bickel, 1987)
- Saccopheronta maai (Bickel, 1987)
- Saccopheronta metallina (Becker, 1922)
- Saccopheronta mindanensis (Bickel, 1987)
- Saccopheronta minor (Becker, 1922)
- Saccopheronta nigra Vanschuytbroeck, 1960
- Saccopheronta nigrimanus (Van Duzee, 1931)
- Saccopheronta nigritibia Negrobov, Vanschuytbroeck & Grichanov, 1981
- Saccopheronta nudipes Becker, 1914
- Saccopheronta occidentalis (Schiner, 1868)
- Saccopheronta ovata (Van Duzee, 1931)
- Saccopheronta pallidicornis (Van Duzee, 1929)
- Saccopheronta parvilamellata Parent, 1938
- Saccopheronta pedestris (Becker, 1922)
- Saccopheronta planipes (Van Duzee, 1919)
- Saccopheronta platychira (De Meijere, 1916)
- Saccopheronta pollinosa (Van Duzee, 1929)
- Saccopheronta pulchra Vanschuytbroeck, 1951
- Saccopheronta quinta Parent, 1936
- Saccopheronta scaura (Van Duzee, 1929)
- Saccopheronta setosa (Parent, 1931)
- Saccopheronta shatalkini Grichanov, 1997
- Saccopheronta spinulata (Parent, 1931)
- Saccopheronta steyskali (Robinson, 1975)
- Saccopheronta varipes (Van Duzee, 1929)
- Saccopheronta viridiventris (Van Duzee, 1933)
- Saccopheronta vockerothi (Bickel, 1985)
- Saccopheronta zicsiana Grichanov, 1997
