= Pindaia =

Scientific classification
- Kingdom: Animalia
- Phylum: Arthropoda
- Class: Insecta
- Order: Diptera
- Family: Dolichopodidae
- Subfamily: Medeterinae
- Genus: Pindaia; Bickel, 2014

Type species
- Pindaia dispersia Bickel, 2014

Genus of flies

Pindaia is a genus of fly in the family Dolichopodidae from the Australasian realm. It comprises three species known from rainforests and wet sclerophyll forests in New Caledonia and eastern Australia, as well as an undescribed species known from females found in montane Papua New Guinea. The genus is named after the New Caledonian place name "Pindai".

== Species ==
- Pindaia bellangrensis Bickel, 2014 – Australia (New South Wales)
- Pindaia dispersia Bickel, 2014 – New Caledonia
- Pindaia enoggera Bickel, 2014 – Australia (Queensland, New South Wales)
