= Papallacta stenoptera =

Scientific classification
- Kingdom: Animalia
- Phylum: Arthropoda
- Clade: Pancrustacea
- Class: Insecta
- Order: Diptera
- Family: Dolichopodidae
- Subfamily: Medeterinae
- Genus: Papallacta; Bickel, 2006
- Species: P. stenoptera

Binomial name
- Papallacta stenoptera Bickel, 2006

Species of fly

Papallacta stenoptera is a tiny, flightless species of fly in the family Dolichopodidae, and the only member of the genus Papallacta. It was described from mossy páramo habitat near 4000 m in the Andes of Ecuador. Its body measures 1.3 mm in length. Its wings are narrow and greatly reduced in size, and the halteres are also shortened. The arista of the male has a large black obovate flag at its apex, which is thought to be probably used in mate recognition and courtship. The genus is named after the Papallacta Pass, the locality where all known specimens were collected. The species name, stenoptera, is derived from the Greek for "narrow wing", referring to the narrow, reduced wings of the species.
