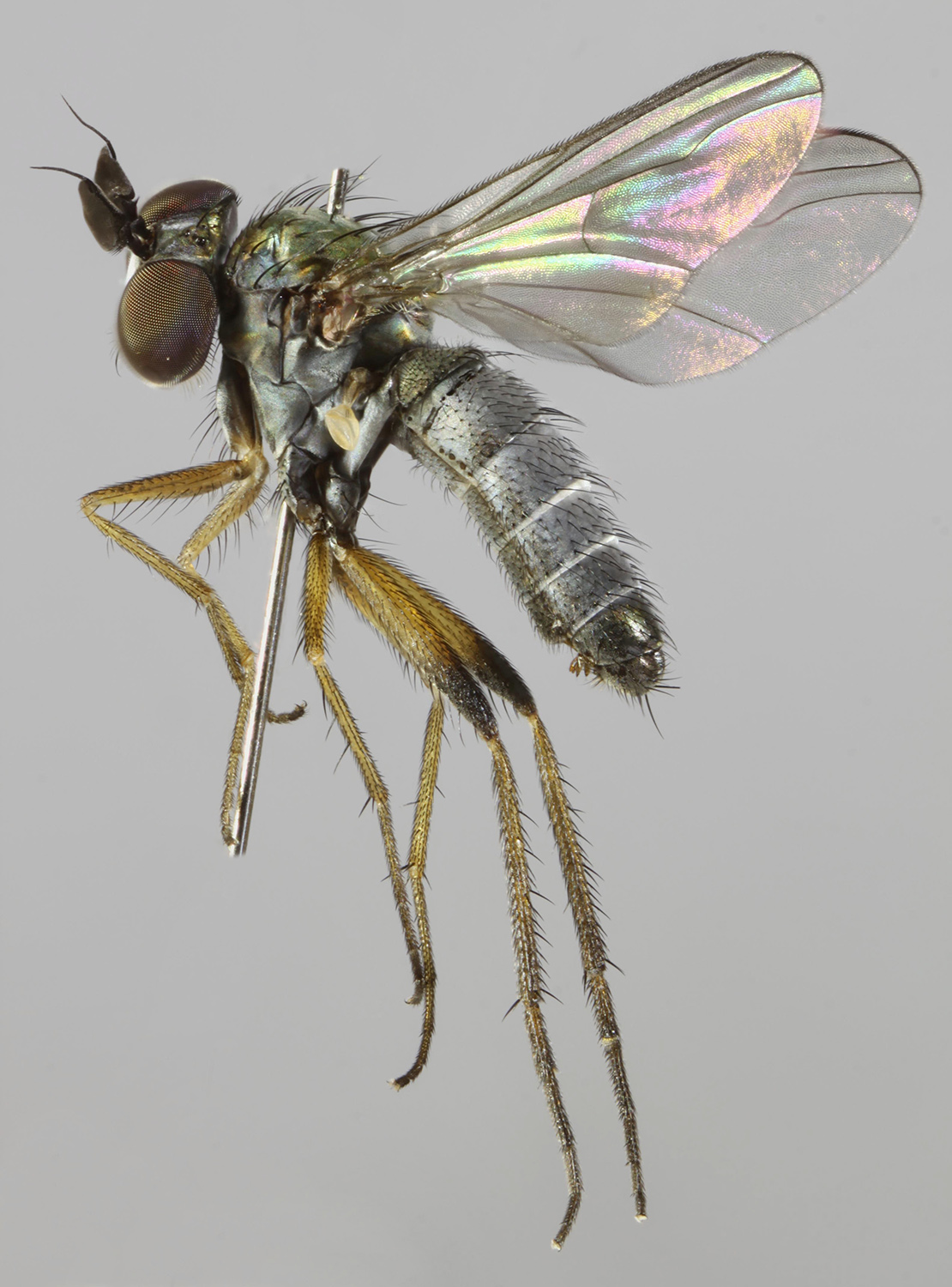
- Argyra vestita male

Scientific classification
- Kingdom: Animalia
- Phylum: Arthropoda
- Class: Insecta
- Order: Diptera
- Family: Dolichopodidae
- Subfamily: Diaphorinae
- Tribe: Argyrini
- Genus: Argyra
- Species: A. vestita

Binomial name
- Argyra vestita (Wiedemann, 1817)

Synonyms
- Dolichopus vestita Wiedemann, 1817

= Argyra vestita =

Species of fly

Argyra vestita is a species of fly in the family Dolichopodidae. It is distributed in Europe.
