= Atlatlia =

Atlatlia Temporal range: Eocene–Present

Scientific classification
- Kingdom: Animalia
- Phylum: Arthropoda
- Class: Insecta
- Order: Diptera
- Family: Dolichopodidae
- Subfamily: Medeterinae
- Genus: Atlatlia; Bickel, 1986

Type species
- Atlatlia grisea Bickel, 1986

Genus of flies

Atlatlia is a genus of flies in the family Dolichopodidae. It was originally established for two species found in eucalypt forests in Australia, and was later expanded to include a third Australian species, three species from New Caledonia, and a number of extinct species found in Baltic and Bitterfeld amber from the Paleogene. The appearance of Atlatlia in Baltic/Bitterfeld amber suggests that the genus once had a much wider distribution. In males of the Atlatlia grisea species group, the seventh segment of the abdomen is extremely elongated, forming a hypopygial peduncle. The name of the genus is derived from atlatl, the Nahuatl word for "spear-thrower", in reference to the male preabdomen which appears to act as an atlatl for the hypopygial peduncle.

== Species ==
The genus includes fifteen species, which are divided into two species groups:

Atlatlia grisea group:

- Atlatlia acra Bickel in Bickel & Martin, 2025 – New Caledonia
- Atlatlia argenticoxa Bickel in Bickel & Martin, 2025 – New Caledonia
- Atlatlia cowanae Bickel in Bickel & Martin, 2025 – New Caledonia
- Atlatlia flaviseta Bickel, 1986 – Australia (Western Australia)
- Atlatlia grisea Bickel, 1986 – Australia (New South Wales)
- Atlatlia isolata Bickel in Bickel & Martin, 2025 – Australia (New South Wales)
- †Atlatlia corynoura Bickel in Bickel & Martin, 2025 – Baltic amber, Eocene/Oligocene
- †Atlatlia electrica Bickel in Bickel & Martin, 2025 – Baltic amber and Bitterfeld amber, Eocene/Oligocene
- †Atlatlia licina Bickel in Bickel & Martin, 2025 – Baltic amber, Eocene/Oligocene

Atlatlia ulrichi group:

- †Atlatlia angulicauda Bickel in Bickel & Martin, 2025 – Baltic amber, Eocene/Oligocene
- †Atlatlia cryptica Bickel in Bickel & Martin, 2025 – Baltic amber, Eocene/Oligocene
- †Atlatlia penicillata Bickel in Bickel & Martin, 2025 – Baltic amber, Eocene/Oligocene
- †Atlatlia ramosa Bickel in Bickel & Martin, 2025 – Baltic amber, Eocene/Oligocene
- †Atlatlia tonsa Bickel in Bickel & Martin, 2025 – Baltic amber, Eocene/Oligocene
- †Atlatlia ulrichi Bickel in Bickel & Martin, 2025 – Baltic amber and Bitterfeld amber, Eocene/Oligocene
