= Argyra atriceps =

Scientific classification
- Kingdom: Animalia
- Phylum: Arthropoda
- Class: Insecta
- Order: Diptera
- Family: Dolichopodidae
- Genus: Argyra
- Species: A. atriceps

Binomial name
- Argyra atriceps Loew, 1857

Species of fly

Argyra atriceps is a species of fly in the family Dolichopodidae. It is found in the Palearctic.
