= Argyra leucocephala =

Scientific classification
- Kingdom: Animalia
- Phylum: Arthropoda
- Class: Insecta
- Order: Diptera
- Family: Dolichopodidae
- Genus: Argyra
- Species: A. leucocephala

Binomial name
- Argyra leucocephala (Meigen, 1824)

Synonyms
- ?Musca semiargentata Donovan, 1795; Porphyrops fulgens Haliday, 1832; Porphyrops leucocephala Meigen, 1824; Dolichopus vivida Meigen, 1824; Dolichopus argentella Zetterstedt, 1843

Species of fly

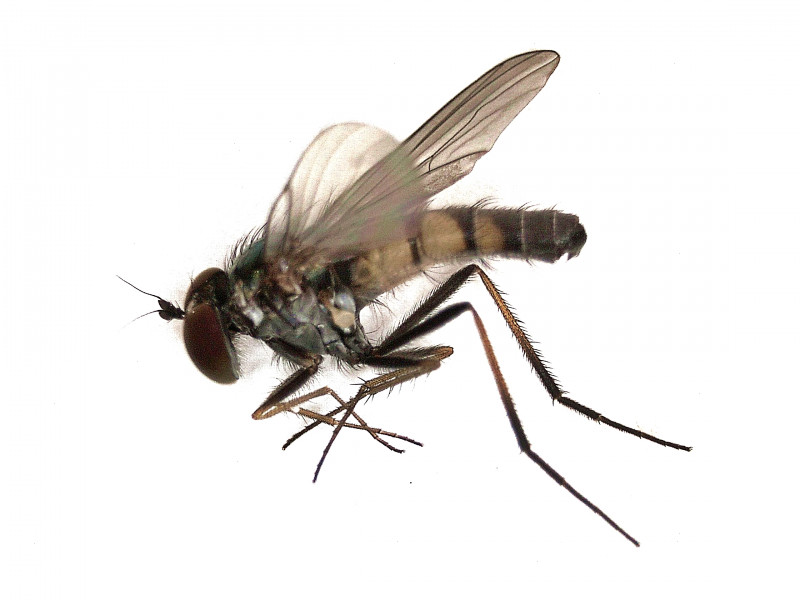

Argyra leucocephala is a species of fly in the family Dolichopodidae. It is distributed in Europe, except for the southeast.
