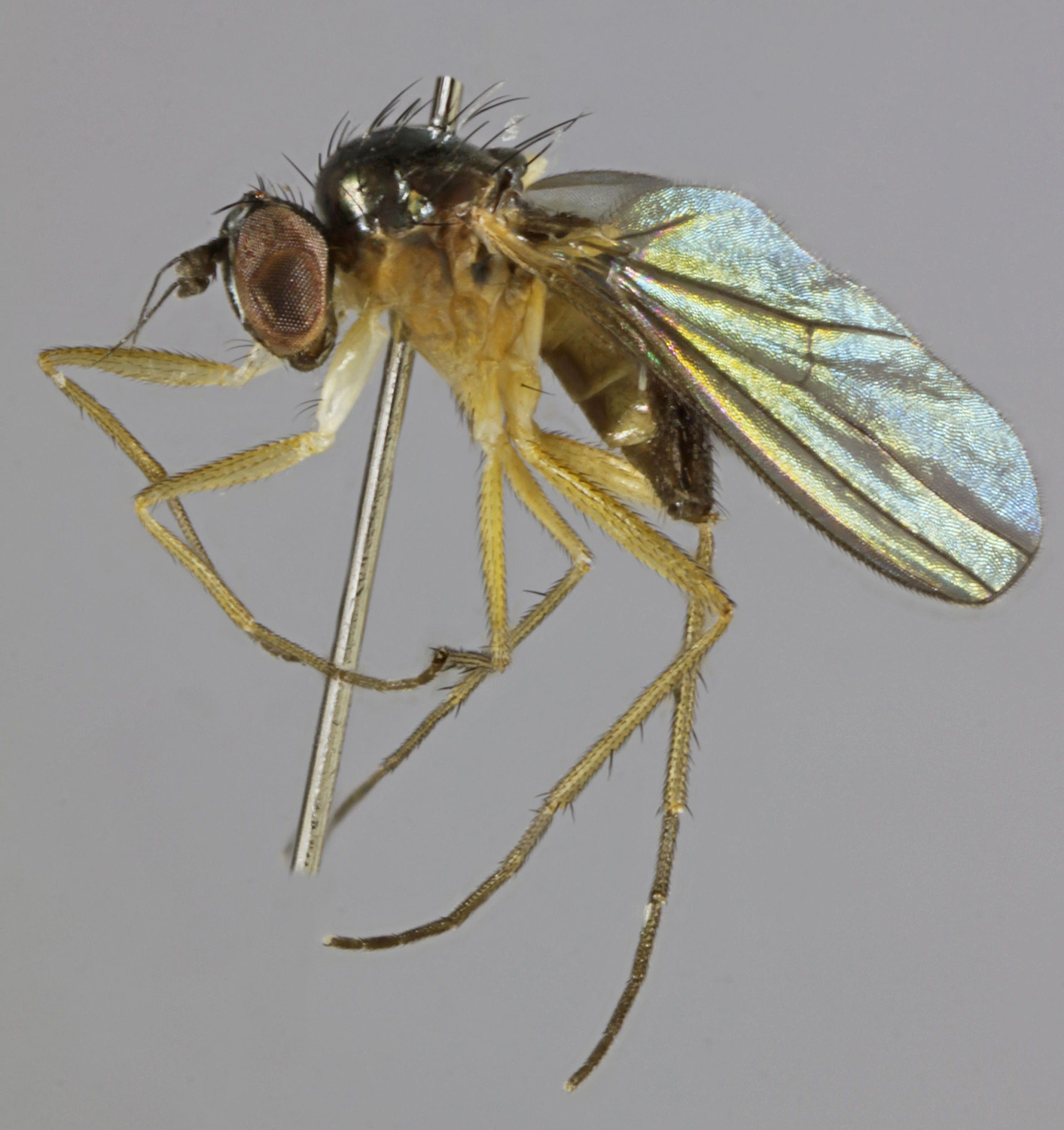
- Anepsiomyia flaviventris, North Wales

Scientific classification
- Kingdom: Animalia
- Phylum: Arthropoda
- Class: Insecta
- Order: Diptera
- Family: Dolichopodidae
- Subfamily: Peloropeodinae
- Genus: Anepsiomyia; Bezzi, 1902
- Species: A. flaviventris

Binomial name
- Anepsiomyia flaviventris (Meigen, 1824)

Synonyms
- Genus: Anepsius Loew, 1857 (nec LeConte, 1851); Species: Porphyrops flaviventris Meigen, 1824; Porphyrops flavicoxa Meigen, 1824

= Anepsiomyia =

Genus of flies

Anepsiomyia is a genus of flies in the family Dolichopodidae. It contains only one extant species from Europe, Anepsiomyia flaviventris. The systematic position of the genus is currently uncertain: it has been variously placed in subfamilies such as Sympycninae and Peloropeodinae.

== Taxonomic history ==
The species Anepsiomyia flaviventris was first described as Porphyrops flaviventris by Johann Wilhelm Meigen in 1824. In 1857, Hermann Loew classified the species as its own genus, Anepsius, which he considered to be most closely related to the genus Sympycnus; the name Anepsius is derived from the Ancient Greek word ἀνεψιός (anepsiós, 'cousin'), referring to this close relationship. Later, Mario Bezzi found this name to be preoccupied by the darkling beetle genus Anepsius (LeConte, 1851), so he renamed Loew's genus to Anepsiomyia in 1902.

Two fossil species from the Eocene of Russia and Belarus were formerly placed in this genus, Anepsiomyia planipedia (Meunier, 1907) and Anepsiomyia atterraneus Nazaraw, 1994; in 2024, they were transferred to the genera Medeterites and Palaeoargyra, respectively.

== Distribution ==
A. flaviventris is found in Northwestern and central Europe, as well as in Portugal.
