= Medetera =

- Medetera sp.

Scientific classification
- Kingdom: Animalia
- Phylum: Arthropoda
- Clade: Pancrustacea
- Class: Insecta
- Order: Diptera
- Family: Dolichopodidae
- Subfamily: Medeterinae
- Tribe: Medeterini
- Genus: Medetera; Fischer von Waldheim, 1819

Type species
- Medetera carnivora (= Musca diadema Linnaeus, 1767) Fischer von Waldheim, 1819

Synonyms
- Pachystoma Swinderen, 1822; Medeterus Meigen, 1824 (Missp.); Taechobates Haliday, 1832; Orthobates Wahlberg, 1844; Anorthus Loew, 1850; Oligochaetus Mik, 1878; ?Saccopheronta Becker, 1914 (disputed); Medeterus Bigot, 1890 (Missp.) (nec Meigen, 1824); Elongomedetera Hollis, 1964; ?Asioligochaetus Negrobov, 1966 (disputed); Lorea Negrobov, 1966

Genus of flies

Medetera is a large genus of flies in the family Dolichopodidae. It includes about 350 species worldwide. The adults are commonly found resting on vertical surfaces such as tree trunks, on which they have a characteristic vertical upright stance. Because of this stance, they are sometimes known as "woodpecker flies". Medetera adults are predators of soft-bodied arthropods, while the larvae are predators of bark beetle larvae.

A 2011 molecular phylogenetic analysis of Medetera and related genera found that Medetera is paraphyletic with respect to Dolichophorus, and that Thrypticus is a sister taxon to Medetera + Dolichophorus.

== Species ==
Taxonomy follows Bickel (1985, 1987), though some of the species groups are treated as separate genera by other authors.

- nova species group:
  - Medetera dominicensis Robinson, 1975
  - Medetera nova Van Duzee, 1919
  - Medetera xanthotricha Becker, 1922
  - one undescribed species from Chiapas, Mexico
- isobellae species group:
  - Medetera isobellae Bickel, 1985
  - Medetera pseudonigripes Robinson, 1975
- petulca species group:
  - Medetera aeneiventris Van Duzee, 1933
  - Medetera aequalis Van Duzee, 1919
  - Medetera albescens (Parent, 1925)
  - (?)Medetera araneipes Parent, 1929
  - Medetera chrysotimiformis Kowarz, 1868
  - Medetera dorycondylus Bickel, 1985
  - Medetera falcata Van Duzee, 1919
  - Medetera flavirostris Negrobov, 1966
  - Medetera leucarista Stackelberg, 1947
  - (?)Medetera perplexa (Becker, 1917) (sometimes a synonym of Acropsilus niger (Loew, 1869))
  - Medetera petulca Wheeler, 1899
  - Medetera physothrix Bickel, 1985
  - Medetera platythrix Bickel, 1985
  - Medetera postminima Steyskal, 1967
  - Medetera potomac Bickel, 1985
  - Medetera prjachinae Negrobov & Stackelberg, 1972
  - Medetera similis Van Duzee, 1919
  - (?)Medetera turkestanica (Stackelberg, 1926)
  - Medetera turkmenorum (Stackelberg, 1937)
  - Medetera utahensis Bickel, 1985
  - Medetera vlasovi (Stackelberg, 1937): see Asioligochaetus
  - Medetera walschaertsi Gosseries, 1989 (nom. nov. for Medetera alpina Harmston & Knowlton, 1941)
  - Medetera xerophila Wheeler, 1899
  - Medetera zimini Negrobov, 1966
- aberrans species group (= Saccopheronta Becker, 1914):
  - Medetera aberrans Wheeler, 1899
  - Medetera abrupta Van Duzee, 1919
  - Medetera albitarsis Van Duzee, 1931
  - †Medetera amissa Bickel & Solórzano Kraemer, 2016
  - Medetera amplimanus Van Duzee, 1931
  - Medetera archboldi Robinson, 1975
  - Medetera bella Van Duzee, 1929
  - Medetera caffra Curran, 1927
  - Medetera dilatata Becker, 1922
  - Medetera excavata Becker, 1922
  - Medetera flabellifera Becker, 1922
  - Medetera flavides Negrobov & Thuneberg, 1970
  - Medetera gomwa Bickel, 1987
  - Medetera hirsuticosta (Parent, 1935)
  - Medetera jamaicensis Curran, 1928
  - Medetera johnthomasi Bickel & Arnaud, 2011
  - Medetera kandyensis Naglis & Bickel, 2012
  - Medetera luzonensis Bickel, 1987
  - Medetera maai Bickel, 1987
  - Medetera metallina Becker, 1922
  - Medetera mindanensis Bickel, 1987
  - Medetera minor Becker, 1922
  - Medetera montserratensis Runyon, 2020
  - Medetera nigra (Vanschuytbroeck, 1960)
  - Medetera nigrimanus Van Duzee, 1931
  - Medetera nudipes (Becker, 1914)
  - Medetera occidentalis Schiner, 1868
  - Medetera ovata Van Duzee, 1931
  - Medetera pallidicornis Van Duzee, 1929
  - Medetera parvilamellata (Parent, 1938)
  - Medetera pedestris Becker, 1922
  - Medetera peradeniya Naglis & Bickel, 2012
  - Medetera planipes Van Duzee, 1919
  - Medetera platychira De Meijere, 1916
  - Medetera pollinosa Van Duzee, 1929
  - Medetera pulchra (Vanschuytbroeck, 1951)
  - Medetera quinta (Parent, 1936)
  - Medetera scaura Van Duzee, 1929
  - Medetera setosa Parent, 1931
  - Medetera spinulata Parent, 1931
  - Medetera steyskali Robinson, 1975
  - Medetera tarsata Parent, 1931
  - Medetera tritarsa Parent, 1928
  - Medetera varipes Van Duzee, 1929
  - Medetera viridiventris Van Duzee, 1933
  - Medetera vockerothi Bickel, 1985
- melanesiana species group (= Demetera Grichanov 2011):
  - Medetera demeteri (Grichanov, 1997)
  - Medetera kokodensis Bickel, 1987
  - Medetera macalpinei Bickel, 1987
  - Medetera malaisei Bickel, 1987
  - Medetera melanesiana Bickel, 1987
  - Medetera morobensis Bickel, 1987
  - Medetera niuginiensis Bickel, 1987
  - Medetera rhetheura Bickel, 1987
- signaticornis-pinicola species group:
  - signaticornis species subgroup:
    - Medetera aldrichi Wheeler, 1899
    - Medetera bistriata Parent, 1929
    - Medetera flinflon Bickel, 1985
    - Medetera signaticornis Loew, 1857
    - Medetera subsignaticornis Bickel, 1985
  - pinicola species subgroup:
    - Medetera adjaniae Gosseries, 1989 (nom. nov. for Medetera breviseta Parent, 1927)
    - Medetera fascinator Negrobov & Stackelberg, 1972
    - Medetera fumida Negrobov, 1967
    - Medetera gaspensis Bickel, 1985
    - Medetera kinabaluensis Bickel, 1987
    - Medetera maura Wheeler, 1899
    - Medetera melancholica Lundbeck, 1912
    - Medetera neomelancholia Bickel, 1985
    - Medetera obscura (Zetterstedt, 1838)
    - Medetera occultans Negrobov, 1970
    - Medetera pinicola Kowarz, 1878
    - Medetera polonica Negrobov & Capecki, 1977
    - Medetera ravida Negrobov, 1970
    - Medetera vidua Wheeler, 1899
- apicalis species group:
  - Medetera abstrusa Thuneberg, 1955
  - Medetera acanthura Negrobov & Thuneberg, 1970
  - Medetera albens Tang, Wang & Yang, 2016
  - Medetera apicalis (Zetterstedt, 1843)
  - Medetera apicipes De Meijere, 1916
  - Medetera austroapicalis Bickel, 1987
  - Medetera baicalica Negrobov, 1972
  - Medetera belgica Parent, 1936
  - Medetera betulae Ringdahl, 1949
  - Medetera bisecta Negrobov, 1967
  - Medetera bisetifera Tang, Wang & Yang, 2016
  - Medetera borealis Thuneberg, 1955
  - Medetera chandleri Bickel, 1987
  - Medetera curviloba Negrobov & Stackelberg, 1972
  - Medetera cuspidata Collin, 1941
  - Medetera cyanogaster Wheeler, 1899
  - Medetera delita Negrobov & Stackelberg, 1972
  - Medetera exornata Tang, Wang & Yang, 2015
  - Medetera feminina Negrobov, 1967
  - Medetera fissa Negrobov & Stackelberg, 1972
  - Medetera furcata Curran, 1928
  - Medetera furva Tang, Wang & Yang, 2015
  - Medetera glauca Loew, 1869
  - Medetera gracilicauda Parent, 1927
  - Medetera himalayensis Bickel, 1987
  - Medetera hissarica Negrobov & Stackelberg, 1972
  - Medetera incisa Negrobov & Stackelberg, 1972
  - Medetera impigra Collin, 1941
  - Medetera kowarzi Negrobov, 1972
  - Medetera liwo Bickel, 1987
  - Medetera longinervis Van Duzee, 1928
  - Medetera longitarsis De Meijere, 1916
  - Medetera morgei Negrobov, 1971
  - Medetera nepalensis Bickel, 1987
  - Medetera pallipes (Zetterstedt, 1843)
  - Medetera palmaris Negrobov & Stackelberg, 1972
  - Medetera parenti Stackelberg, 1925
  - Medetera peloria Negrobov, 1967
  - Medetera pseudoapicalis Thuneberg, 1955
  - Medetera pseudosibirica Bickel, 1985
  - Medetera pumila De Meijere, 1916
  - Medetera relicta Negrobov, 1967
  - Medetera saguaroicola Bickel, 1985
  - Medetera seguyi Parent, 1926
    - Medetera seguyi seguyi Parent, 1926
    - Medetera seguyi sphaeroidea Negrobov, 1967
  - Medetera sibirica Negrobov & Stackelberg, 1972
  - Medetera stomias Bickel, 1987
  - Medetera subtristis Negrobov, 1970
  - Medetera takagii Negrobov, 1970
  - Medetera taurica Negrobov & Stackelberg, 1972
  - Medetera triseta Tang, Wang & Yang, 2016
  - Medetera tristis (Zetterstedt, 1838)
  - Medetera tumidula Negrobov, 1967
  - Medetera zaitzevi Negrobov, 1972
- crassivenis species group:
  - Medetera asiatica Negrobov & Zaitzev, 1979
  - Medetera crassivenis Curran, 1928
  - Medetera excellens Frey, 1909
  - Medetera freyi Thuneberg, 1955
  - Medetera incrassata Frey, 1909
  - Medetera infuscata Negrobov & Stackelberg, 1972
  - Medetera inspissata Collin, 1952
  - Medetera marylandica Robinson, 1967
  - Medetera protuberans Negrobov, 1967
  - Medetera thunebergi Negrobov, 1967
  - Medetera tuberculosa Negrobov, 1972
- diadema-veles species group:
  - Medetera ambigua (Zetterstedt, 1843)
  - Medetera armeniaca Negrobov & Stackelberg, 1972
  - Medetera arnaudi Harmston, 1951
  - Medetera californiensis Wheeler, 1899
  - Medetera canadensis Bickel, 1985
  - Medetera capillata Negrobov & Stackelberg, 1972
  - Medetera dendrobaena Kowarz, 1877
  - Medetera deserticola (Stackelberg, 1926)
  - Medetera diadema (Linnaeus, 1767)
  - Medetera flava Tang, Wang & Yang, 2016
  - Medetera flavipes Meigen, 1824
  - Medetera ganshuiensis Tang, Wang & Yang, 2016
  - Medetera grisescens De Meijere, 1916
  - Medetera halteralis Van Duzee, 1919
  - Medetera infumata Loew, 1857
  - Medetera jacula (Fallén, 1823)
  - Medetera kerzhneri Negrobov, 1966
  - Medetera lamprostoma Loew, 1871
  - Medetera lihuae Tang, Wang & Yang, 2016
  - Medetera micacea Loew, 1857
  - Medetera mixta Negrobov, 1967
  - Medetera modesta Van Duzee, 1914
  - Medetera mongolica Negrobov, 1966
  - Medetera montana Negrobov, 1972
  - Medetera nebulosa Negrobov & Stackelberg, 1972
  - Medetera nigripes Loew, 1861
  - Medetera opaca De Meijere, 1916
  - Medetera paralamprostoma Negrobov & Stackelberg, 1972
  - Medetera pavlovskii Negrobov & Stackelberg, 1972
  - Medetera petrophila Kowarz, 1878
  - Medetera plumbella Meigen, 1824
  - Medetera shiae Tang, Wang & Yang, 2016
  - Medetera shuimogouensis Tang, Wang & Yang, 2016
  - Medetera spinulicauda Negrobov, 1970
  - Medetera sinuosa Tang, Wang & Yang, 2015
  - Medetera stylata Negrobov & Stackelberg, 1972
  - Medetera subgrisescens Naglis & Bickel, 2012
  - Medetera tenuicauda Loew, 1857
  - Medetera transformata Tang, Wang & Yang, 2016
  - Medetera truncorum Meigen, 1824
  - Medetera tuktoyaktuk Bickel, 1985
  - Medetera veles Loew, 1861
  - Medetera victoris Negrobov, 1972
  - Medetera vittata Van Duzee, 1919
  - Medetera xiquegouensis Tang, Wang & Yang, 2016
- chillcotti species group:
  - Medetera bishopae Bickel, 1987
  - Medetera chillcotti Bickel, 1987
- australiana species group:
  - Medetera australiana Bickel, 1987
  - Medetera mosmanensis Bickel, 1987
  - Medetera queenslandensis Bickel, 1987
  - Medetera wongabelensis Bickel, 1987
- toxopeusi species group:
  - Medetera cheesmanae Bickel, 1987
  - Medetera gressitti Bickel, 1987
  - Medetera irianensis Bickel, 1987
  - Medetera papuensis Bickel, 1987
  - Medetera toxopeusi Parent, 1932
  - Medetera vivida Becker, 1922
  - Medetera waris Bickel, 1987
- gracilis species group:
  - Medetera borneensis Bickel, 1987
  - Medetera gracilis Parent, 1935
  - Medetera penangensis Bickel, 1987
  - Medetera sandakanensis Bickel, 1987
- flaviscutellum species group:
  - Medetera athertonensis Bickel, 1987
  - Medetera bunyensis Bickel, 1987
  - Medetera colombensis Naglis & Bickel, 2012
  - Medetera dorrigensis Bickel, 1987
  - Medetera flaviscutellum Bickel, 1987
  - Medetera gingra Bickel, 1987
  - Medetera killertonensis Bickel, 1987
  - Medetera philippinensis Bickel, 1987
  - Medetera uda Bickel, 1987
- salomonis species group (= Medeterella Grichanov 2011):
  - Medetera austrofemoralis Bickel, 1987
  - Medetera femoralis Becker, 1922
  - Medetera malayensis Bickel, 1987
  - Medetera mooneyensis Bickel, 1987
  - Medetera nigrohalterata Parent, 1932
  - Medetera olivacea De Meijere, 1916
  - Medetera pospelovi Grichanov, 1997
  - Medetera pseudofemoralis Bickel, 1987
  - Medetera salomonis Parent, 1941

Unsorted:

- Medetera abnormis Yang & Yang, 1995
- Medetera adsumpta Becker, 1922
- Medetera africana Grichanov, 2000
  - Medetera africana africana Grichanov, 2000
  - Medetera africana senegalensis Grichanov, 2000
- Medetera aglaops Pollet in Pollet et al., 2022
- Medetera albiseta Parent, 1927
- Medetera albisetosa (Parent, 1925)
- Medetera alexandri Negrobov, 1979
- Medetera alpicola Naglis & Negrobov, 2014
- Medetera altra Parent, 1931
- Medetera anjudanica Grichanov & Ahmadi, 2017
- Medetera annulitarsus von Roser, 1840
- Medetera anus Becker, 1922
- Medetera arrogans (Parent, 1927)
- Medetera babelthaup Bickel, 1995
- Medetera bargusinica Negrobov, 1972
- Medetera bidentata Negrobov & Golubtsov, 1991
- Medetera bilineata Frey, 1915
- Medetera bispinosa Negrobov, 1967
- Medetera brevispina Yang & Saigusa, 2001
- Medetera brevitarsa Parent, 1927
- Medetera brunea Negrobov, 1970
- Medetera bweza Grichanov, 2000
- Medetera caeruleifacies Naglis & Negrobov, 2014
- Medetera calvinia Grichanov, 2000
- Medetera campestris Naglis & Negrobov, 2014
- Medetera capensis Curran, 1926
- Medetera capitiloba Negrobov & Stackelberg, 1972
- Medetera cederholmi Grichanov, 1997
- Medetera chumakovi Grichanov, 1997
- Medetera cimbebasia Grichanov, 2000
- Medetera collarti Negrobov, 1967
- Medetera complicata Negrobov, 1967
- Medetera compressa Yang & Saigusa, 2001
- Medetera corsicana Pollet in Pollet et al., 2022
- Medetera crassicauda Robinson, 1975
- Medetera curvata Yang & Saigusa, 2000
- Medetera curvipyga Naglis & Negrobov, 2014
- Medetera despecta Parent, 1927
- Medetera dichrocera Kowarz, 1878
- Medetera ealensis Parent, 1936
- Medetera educata Negrobov, 1979
- Medetera edwardsi Grichanov, 1997
- Medetera emeljanovi Negrobov & Naglis, 2015
- Medetera evenhuisi Yang & Yang, 1995
- Medetera excipiens Becker, 1922
- Medetera excisa Parent, 1914
- Medetera exigua Aldrich, 1902
- Medetera fasciata Frey, 1915
- Medetera flavichaeta Naglis, 2013
- Medetera flavicornis Becker, 1922
- Medetera flavigena Masunaga & Saigusa, 1998
- Medetera flaviseta Van Duzee, 1929
- Medetera flavitarsis Van Duzee, 1930
- Medetera galapagensis Bickel & Sinclair, 1997
- Medetera ghesquierei Grichanov, 1999
- Medetera gibbosipyga Pollet in Pollet et al., 2022
- Medetera glaucella Kowarz, 1878
- Medetera glaucelloides Naglis, 2013
- Medetera gotohorum Masunaga & Saigusa, 1998
- Medetera grunini Negrobov, 1966
- Medetera gussakovskii Negrobov, 1966
- Medetera helvetica Naglis & Negrobov, 2014
- Medetera hispanica Pollet in Pollet et al., 2022
- Medetera hymera Negrobov & Stackelberg, 1972
- Medetera insignis Girschner, 1888
- Medetera iviei Runyon, 2020
- Medetera jakuta Negrobov & Stackelberg, 1972
- Medetera japonica Negrobov, 1970
- Medetera jugalis Collin, 1941
- Medetera junensis Bickel, 2013
- Medetera kaszabi Negrobov, 1970
- Medetera krivolutskiji Negrobov, 1991
- Medetera krivosheinae Negrobov, 1968
- Medetera lamprostomoides Negrobov & Stackelberg, 1972
  - Medetera lamprostomoides kasachstanica Negrobov & Stackelberg, 1972
  - Medetera lamprostomoides lamprostomoides Negrobov & Stackelberg, 1972
- Medetera latipennis Negrobov, 1970
- Medetera londti Grichanov, 2000
- Medetera longa Negrobov & Thuneberg, 1970
- Medetera longicauda Becker, 1917
- Medetera longisurstylata Maslova, Negrobov & Obona, 2018
- Medetera lorea Negrobov, 1967
- Medetera lusitana Pollet in Pollet et al., 2022
- Medetera luteipes Masunaga & Saigusa, 1998
- Medetera lvovskii Grichanov, 1999
- Medetera maynei Curran, 1925
- Medetera media Parent, 1925
- Medetera meridionalis Negrobov, 1967
- Medetera miki Negrobov, 1972
- Medetera minima De Meijere, 1916
- Medetera mucronata Negrobov & Golubtzov, 1991
- Medetera munroi Curran, 1925
- Medetera muralis Meigen, 1824
- Medetera murina Becker, 1917
- Medetera nakamurai Masunaga & Saigusa, 1998
- Medetera negrobovi Gosseries, 1989
- Medetera neixiangensis Yang & Saigusa, 1999
- Medetera neopavlovskii Grichanov & Gilasian, 2023
- Medetera nitida (Macquart, 1834)
- Medetera nocturna Curran, 1927
- Medetera norlingi Grichanov, 1997
- Medetera normalis Curran, 1924
- Medetera nubilans Negrobov & Tsurikov, 1991
- Medetera nudicoxa Becker, 1922
- Medetera nuwarensis Naglis & Bickel, 2012
- Medetera obesa Kowarz, 1878
- Medetera olegi Naglis, 2013
- Medetera otiosa Parent, 1934
- Medetera pachyneura Meuffels & Grootaert, 2007
- Medetera pallens Negrobov, 1967
- Medetera pallidior (Stackelberg, 1937)
- Medetera pallidotiosa Grichanov, 2000
- Medetera parva Pollet in Pollet et al., 2022
- Medetera parvicornis Santos Abreu, 1929
- Medetera penicillata Negrobov, 1970
- Medetera penura Curran, 1926
- Medetera perfida Parent, 1932
- Medetera petrophiloides Parent, 1925
- Medetera plebeia Parent, 1928
- Medetera polita Parent, 1936
- Medetera polleti Grichanov, 1997
- Medetera praedator Curran, 1926
  - Medetera praedator aequatorialis Grichanov, 2000
  - Medetera praedator praedator Curran, 1926
- Medetera pseudotiosa Grichanov, 1999
- Medetera pulchrifacies Santos Abreu, 1929
- Medetera rara Negrobov, 1991
- Medetera rectipyga Pollet in Pollet et al., 2022
- Medetera rhombomium (Stackelberg, 1937)
- Medetera rikhterae Grichanov, 1997
- Medetera roghii Rampini & Canzoneri, 1979
- Medetera rufipes Negrobov & Stackelberg, 1972
- Medetera sakhalinensis Negrobov & Naglis, 2015
- Medetera saxatilis Collin, 1941
- Medetera seksyaevae Grichanov, 1999
- Medetera senicula Kowarz, 1878
- Medetera seriata Robinson, 1975
- Medetera setiventris Thuneberg, 1955
- Medetera sfax Grichanov, 2010
- Medetera simplicis Curran, 1924
- Medetera sphaeropyga Negrobov, 1972
- Medetera spinigera (Stackelberg, 1937)
- Medetera stackelbergiana Negrobov, 1967
- Medetera stoltzei Grichanov, 1999
- Medetera storai Frey, 1936
- Medetera striata Parent, 1927
- Medetera subchevi Grichanov, 1997
- Medetera subviridis Parent, 1939
- Medetera sutshanica Negrobov & Stackelberg, 1972
- Medetera sylvestris (Becker, 1908)
- Medetera tarasovae Negrobov, 1972
- Medetera ticinensis Naglis & Negrobov, 2014
- †Medetera totolapa Bickel & Solórzano Kraemer, 2016
- Medetera tropica Negrobov, 1991
- Medetera tuberculata Negrobov, 1966
- Medetera unicolor Becker, 1922
- Medetera unisetosa Collin, 1941
- Medetera ussuriana Negrobov, 1972
- Medetera vaalensis Grichanov, 2000
- Medetera vagans Becker, 1917
- Medetera valaisensis Naglis & Negrobov, 2014
- Medetera varitibia Parent, 1935
- Medetera varvara Grichanov & Vikhrev, 2009
- Medetera verae Negrobov, 1967
- Medetera viridicolor Becker, 1922
- Medetera xizangensis Yang, 1999
- Medetera yangi Zhu, Yang & Masunaga, 2006
- Medetera yunnanensis Yang & Saigusa, 2001
- Medetera zhejiangensis Yang & Yang, 1995
- Medetera zinovjevi Negrobov, 1967

The following species are nomina dubia:

- Medetera comes Hardy, 1939 (type material lost, possibly a member of the australiana group)
- Medetera extranea Becker, 1922 (type material lost, unplaced to genus)

The following species are synonyms of other species:

- Medetera afra Curran, 1927: Synonym of Medetera simplicis Curran, 1924
- Medetera carnivora Fischer von Waldheim, 1819: Synonym of Medetera diadema (Linnaeus, 1767)
- Medetera cilifemorata Van Duzee, 1933: Synonym of Medetera grisescens De Meijere, 1916
- Medetera collini Thuneberg, 1955: Synonym of Medetera parenti Stackelberg, 1925
- Medetera cryophora Séguy, 1963: Synonym of Medetera murina Becker, 1917
- Medetera dendrophila Becker, 1917: Synonym of Medetera pallipes (Zetterstedt, 1843)
- Medetera hawaiiensis Van Duzee, 1933: Synonym of Medetera grisescens De Meijere, 1916
- Medetera idahoensis Harmston & Knowlton, 1943: Synonym of Medetera crassivenis Curran, 1928
- Medetera intermedia Van Duzee, 1928: Synonym of Medetera veles Loew, 1861
- Medetera lachaisei Couturier, 1986: Synonym of Dolichophorus luteoscutatus (Parent, 1936)
- Medetera longimana Van Duzee, 1933: Synonym of Medetera californiensis Wheeler, 1899
- Medetera minuta von Roser, 1840: Synonym of Medetera plumbella Meigen, 1824
- Medetera nigricans Meigen, 1824: Synonym of Medetera jacula (Fallén, 1823)
- Medetera nuortevai Thuneberg, 1955: Synonym of Medetera pinicola Kowarz, 1878
- Medetera obsoleta Negrobov & Thuneberg, 1971: Synonym of Medetera aeneiventris Van Duzee, 1933
- Medetera orbiculata Van Duzee, 1932: Synonym of Medetera apicalis (Zetterstedt, 1843)
- Medetera oscillans Allen, 1976: synonym of Medetera feminina Negrobov, 1967
- Medetera palmae Hardy, 1939: Synonym of Medetera grisescens De Meijere, 1916
- Medetera piceae Ounap, 1997: Synonym of Medetera pinicola Kowarz, 1878
- Medetera robusta Loew, 1857: Synonym of Medetera obscura (Zetterstedt, 1838)
- Medetera robusta Ounap, 1997: Synonym of Medetera obscura (Zetterstedt, 1838)
- Medetera ruficornis Strobl, 1898: Renamed to Medetera negrobovi Gosseries, 1989
- Medetera rutilans Parent, 1935: Synonym of Medetera maynei Curran, 1925
- Medetera sinuata Parent, 1928: Synonym of Coeloglutus concavus Aldrich, 1896
- Medetera subglauca Becker, 1917: Synonym of Medetera signaticornis Loew, 1857
- Medetera tertia Becker, 1917: Synonym of Medetera muralis Meigen, 1824
- Medetera turneri Parent, 1934: Synonym of Medetera caffra (Curran, 1927)
- Medetera vanschuytbroecki Gosseries, 1989: Synonym of Saccopheronta arnaudi Negrobov, Vanschuytbroeck & Grichanov 1981
- Medetera wheeleri Foote, Coulson & Robinson, 1965: Synonym of Medetera veles Loew, 1861
- Medetera zairensis Dyte & Smith, 1980: Synonym of Medetera caffra (Curran, 1927)

The following species have been transferred to other genera:

- Medetera hamata Parent, 1936: transferred to Dolichophorus
- Medetera luteoscutata Parent, 1936: transferred to Dolichophorus
- Medetera vegrandis Frey, 1925: transferred to Micromorphus
- †Medetera elegantula Meunier, 1907: transferred to Plesiomedetera
- †Medetera flammea Meunier, 1907: transferred to Plesiomedetera
- †Medetera lasciva Meunier, 1907: transferred to Plesiomedetera
- †Medetera mustela Meunier, 1907: transferred to Plesiomedetera
- †Medetera vana Meunier, 1907: transferred to Plesiomedetera

The following species are unplaced in the family:

- †Medetera frauenfeldi Giebel, 1856
