= Dominicomyia =

Scientific classification
- Kingdom: Animalia
- Phylum: Arthropoda
- Clade: Pancrustacea
- Class: Insecta
- Order: Diptera
- Family: Dolichopodidae
- Subfamily: Medeterinae
- Genus: Dominicomyia; Robinson, 1975

Type species
- Dominicomyia chrysotimoides Robinson, 1975

Genus of flies

Dominicomyia is a genus of flies in the family Dolichopodidae. It has two described species, Dominicomyia chrysotimoides and Dominicomyia brasiliensis. This Neotropical genus has only been documented from the countries of Dominica and Brazil. Species in the genus are fairly minute flies, growing to a length of 2 mm (0.079 in), and are glossy green or brownish in their general coloration. They inhabit cement structures, palm trunks, and decomposing vegetative matter.

== Taxonomy ==
The genus Dominicomyia was erected in 1975 by the American entomologist Harold E. Robinson for the species Dominicomyia chrysotimoides, which he described in the same paper based on specimens collected from Dominica. Robinson subsequently described another species of the genus, Dominicomyia brasiliensis, in 1977 based on specimens collected from Brazil. Dominicomyia is closely related to the genus Cryptopygiella.

=== Species ===
- Dominicomyia brasiliensis Robinson, 1977
- Dominicomyia chrysotimoides Robinson, 1975

== Description ==
Dominicomyia species are fairly minute flies, growing to a length of 2 mm (0.079 in). D. chrysotimoides has a glossy green thorax, brownish abdomen with green highlights, and yellow legs. Its head has a glossy green face and yellow palps and antennae. D. brasiliensis is mostly brown in its colouration, although the back of the head is glossy blue and the legs are yellow.

== Distribution and habitat ==
Dominicomyia is a Neotropical genus that has only been documented from the countries of Dominica and Brazil. On Dominica, it is known from the Blenheim River and Clarke Hall. In Brazil, it is known from Itabuna in Bahia state. The two species in the genus seem to have varying habitat preferences; D. chrysotimoides has been collected from cement structures and palm trunks, while D. brasiliensis is known from decomposing banana stems and cacao pods.
