= Argyra ilonae =

Scientific classification
- Kingdom: Animalia
- Phylum: Arthropoda
- Class: Insecta
- Order: Diptera
- Family: Dolichopodidae
- Genus: Argyra
- Species: A. ilonae

Binomial name
- Argyra ilonae Gosseries, 1989

Synonyms
- Dolichopus confinis Zetterstedt, 1843 (nec Walker, 1849)

Species of fly

Argyra ilonae is a species of fly in the family Dolichopodidae. It is found in the Palearctic.
