= Cyrtura =

Cyrtura Temporal range: Tithonian

Scientific classification
- Domain: Eukaryota
- Kingdom: Animalia
- Phylum: Chordata
- Class: Reptilia
- Clade: Pantestudines
- Clade: Testudinata
- Clade: †Thalassochelydia
- Genus: †Cyrtura; Jaekel, 1904
- Species: †C. temnospondyla

Binomial name
- †Cyrtura temnospondyla Jaekel, 1904

Extinct genus of turtles

Cyrtura is a dubious genus of extinct Testudinata from the Late Jurassic (early Tithonian) of the Solnhofen Formation of Bavaria, Germany. Cyrtura was originally described as a temnospondyl amphibian by Otto Jaekel in 1904 on the basis of MNB 1890, the distal portion of a tail with 14 caudal vertebrae. Most authors overlooked the genus, although those who mentioned Cyrtura dismissed it as either undiagnostic or referable to Testudines rather than Temnospondyli. Warren and Hutchinson (1983) rejected the temnospondyl classification of the genus based on examination of a cast of the holotype, and subsequent studies showed that Cyrtura is actually a marine turtle, although the lack of diagnostic characters renders it a nomen dubium.
