= Micromedetera =

Scientific classification
- Kingdom: Animalia
- Phylum: Arthropoda
- Class: Insecta
- Order: Diptera
- Family: Dolichopodidae
- Subfamily: Medeterinae (?)
- Genus: Micromedetera; Robinson, 1975

Type species
- Micromedetera archboldi Robinson, 1975

Genus of flies

Micromedetera is a genus of flies in the family Dolichopodidae from the Caribbean and Panama. The genus belongs to the "micro-dolichopodids", an informal group of genera from the New World which have a body length of 1 mm or less. The genus was originally assigned to the subfamily Medeterinae, but more recently its placement in the subfamily is considered uncertain.

== Species ==
- Micromedetera archboldi Robinson, 1975 – Dominica
- Micromedetera shannoni Robinson, 1975 – Panama
- Micromedetera wirthi Robinson, 1975 – Jamaica
