= Microchrysotus =

Scientific classification
- Kingdom: Animalia
- Phylum: Arthropoda
- Class: Insecta
- Order: Diptera
- Family: Dolichopodidae
- Subfamily: Medeterinae (?)
- Genus: Microchrysotus; Robinson, 1964

Type species
- Microchrysotus mirabilis Robinson, 1964

Genus of flies

Microchrysotus is a genus of flies in the family Dolichopodidae from Mexico. The genus belongs to the "micro-dolichopodids", an informal group of genera from the New World which have a body length of 1 mm or less. The genus was originally assigned to the subfamily Medeterinae, but more recently its placement in the subfamily is considered uncertain.

== Species ==
- Microchrysotus mirabilis Robinson, 1964
- Microchrysotus tarsalis Robinson, 1964
