= Paramedetera =

Scientific classification
- Kingdom: Animalia
- Phylum: Arthropoda
- Class: Insecta
- Order: Diptera
- Family: Dolichopodidae
- Subfamily: Medeterinae
- Genus: Paramedetera; Grootaert & Meuffels, 1997

Type species
- Paramedetera papuensis Grootaert & Meuffels, 1997

Genus of flies

Paramedetera is a genus of flies in the family Dolichopodidae. It is distributed from southern China and Southeast Asia to Papua New Guinea, with a single species from the Afrotropical realm. It is placed in the subfamily Medeterinae, though molecular phylogenetic analyses suggest it may not belong in that subfamily. Unlike most members of Medeterinae, which are arboreal, Paramedetera is soil-dwelling and lives near aquatic habitats.

== Species ==
- Paramedetera ankarum Grootaert & Meuffels, 1997 – Thailand, Singapore
- Paramedetera borneensis Grootaert & Meuffels, 1997 – Brunei
- Paramedetera bruneiensis Grootaert & Meuffels, 1997 – Brunei
- Paramedetera chelata Grootaert, 2006 – Singapore
- Paramedetera digitata Grootaert, 2006 – Singapore
- Paramedetera elongata Zhu, Yang & Grootaert, 2006 – China
- Paramedetera horrorifera Grootaert & Meuffels, 1997 – Thailand
- Paramedetera jinxiuensis Yang & Saigusa, 2001 – China (Guangxi)
- Paramedetera medialis Yang & Saigusa, 1999 – China (Henan)
- Paramedetera micropyga Grootaert, 2006 – Singapore
- Paramedetera obscura Grootaert, 2006 – Singapore
- Paramedetera orientalis (Hollis, 1976) – Sumatra
- Paramedetera papuensis Grootaert & Meuffels, 1997 – Papua New Guinea
- Paramedetera sierraleonensis Grichanov, 1999 – Sierra Leone
- Paramedetera sumatrensis Grootaert & Meuffels, 1997 – Sumatra
- Paramedetera turschi Grootaert & Meuffels, 1997 – Thailand
