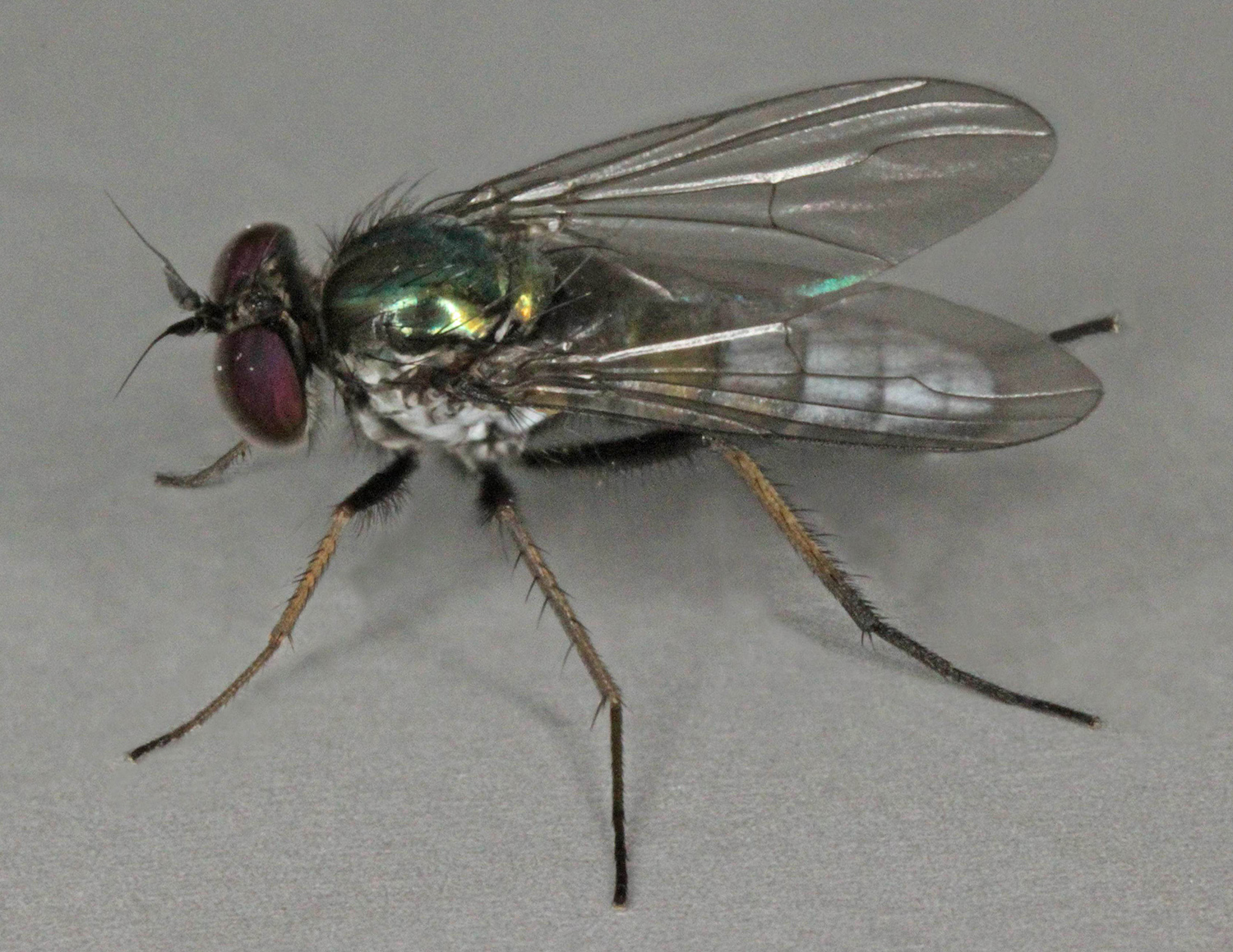
- Argyra diaphana

Scientific classification
- Kingdom: Animalia
- Phylum: Arthropoda
- Clade: Pancrustacea
- Class: Insecta
- Order: Diptera
- Family: Dolichopodidae
- Subfamily: Diaphorinae
- Tribe: Argyrini
- Genus: Argyra; Macquart, 1834

Type species
- Musca diaphana Fabricius, 1775

Synonyms
- Porphyrops Meigen, 1824 (name suppressed); Porphirops Macquart, 1838 (unjustified emendation of Porphyrops); Leucostola Loew, 1857; Lasiargyra Mik, 1878

= Argyra =

Genus of flies

Argyra is a genus of flies in the family Dolichopodidae. The name "Argyra" comes from the Greek word for "silver", referring to the silver pruinescence found on the males of many of the species.

== Species ==
- Argyra albicans Loew, 1861
- Argyra albicoxa Van Duzee, 1925
- Argyra albiventris Loew, 1864
- Argyra aldrichi Johnson, 1904
- Argyra amicta (Wiedemann, 1824)
- Argyra angustata Van Duzee, 1925
- Argyra apicalis Van Duzee, 1930
- Argyra argentina (Meigen, 1824)
- Argyra argentiventris Van Duzee, 1925
- Argyra argyria (Meigen, 1824)
- Argyra aripontia Negrobov, 2005
- Argyra arrogans Takagi, 1960
- Argyra atriceps Loew, 1857
- Argyra auricollis (Meigen, 1824)
- Argyra badjaginae Negrobov & Maslova, 2003
- Argyra barbipes Van Duzee, 1925
- Argyra basalis Van Duzee, 1932
- Argyra beijingensis Wang & Yang, 2004
- Argyra bickeliana Negrobov, Barkalov & Selivanova, 2010
- Argyra bimaculata Van Duzee, 1925
- Argyra biseta Parent, 1929
- Argyra brevipes Van Duzee, 1925
- Argyra calceata Loew, 1861
- Argyra calcitrans Loew, 1861
- Argyra californica Van Duzee, 1925
- Argyra canariensis Becker, 1918
- Argyra ciliata Van Duzee, 1924
- Argyra cingulata (Loew, 1861)
- Argyra condomina Harmston & Knowlton, 1946
- Argyra corsica Parent, 1929
- Argyra currani Van Duzee, 1925
- Argyra cylindrica Loew, 1864
- Argyra dakotensis Harmston & Knowlton, 1939
- Argyra diaphana (Fabricius, 1775)
- Argyra discedens Becker, 1907
- Argyra elongata (Zetterstedt, 1843)
- Argyra fasciventris Van Duzee, 1930
- Argyra femoralis Van Duzee, 1925
- Argyra flabellifera Becker, 1891
- Argyra flavicornis Van Duzee, 1925
- Argyra flavicoxa Van Duzee, 1925
- Argyra flavida Negrobov, 1973
- Argyra flavipes Van Duzee, 1925
- Argyra gorodkovi Negrobov & Selivanova, 2009
- Argyra grata Loew, 1857
- Argyra grayi Robinson, 1964
- Argyra hirta Van Duzee, 1925
- Argyra hoffmeisteri (Loew, 1850)
- Argyra hokkaidoensis Negrobov & Satô, 2009
- Argyra idahona Harmston & Knowlton, 1946
- Argyra igori Negrobov, Satô & Selivanova, 2012
- Argyra ilonae Gosseries, 1989
- Argyra inaequalis Van Duzee, 1925
- Argyra involuta Van Duzee, 1925
- Argyra javanensis Van Duzee, 1931
- Argyra johnsoni Van Duzee, 1925
- Argyra kireichuki Grichanov, 1998
- Argyra leucocephala (Meigen, 1824)
- Argyra loewii Kowarz, 1879
- Argyra longicornis Qilemoge, Wang, & Yang, 2018
- Argyra magnicornis (Zetterstedt, 1838)
- Argyra medusae Gosseries, 1989
- Argyra miki (Kowarz, 1882)
- Argyra minuta Loew, 1861
- Argyra negrobovi Grichanov & Shamshev, 1993
- Argyra nigricoxa Van Duzee, 1925
- Argyra nigripes Loew, 1864
- Argyra nigripilosa Yang & Saigusa, 2002
- Argyra nigriventris Van Duzee, 1925
- Argyra obscura Van Duzee, 1925
- Argyra oreada Negrobov, 1973
- Argyra pallipilosa Yang & Saigusa, 2002
- Argyra perplexa Becker, 1918
- Argyra pingwuensis Qilemoge, Wang, & Yang, 2018
- Argyra pseudosuperba Hollis, 1964
- Argyra pulata Negrobov & Maslova, 2003
- Argyra robinsoni Grichanov, 1998
- Argyra robusta Johnson, 1906
- Argyra scutellaris Van Duzee, 1925
- Argyra sericata Van Duzee, 1925
- Argyra serrata Yang & Saigusa, 2002
- Argyra setimana Loew, 1859
- Argyra setipes Van Duzee, 1925
- Argyra setulipes Becker, 1918
- Argyra shamshevi Selivanova & Negrobov, 2006
- Argyra sichuanensis Qilemoge, Wang, & Yang, 2018
- Argyra similis Harmston & Knowlton, 1940
- Argyra sinensis Yang & Grootaert, 1999
- Argyra skufjini Negrobov, 1965
- Argyra spina Van Duzee, 1925
- Argyra splendens Van Duzee, 1933
- Argyra splendida De Meijere, 1919
- Argyra spoliata Kowarz, 1879
- Argyra striaticollis Becker, 1918
- Argyra subarctica Ringdahl, 1920
- Argyra submontana Negrobov & Selivanova, 2006
- Argyra superba Takagi, 1960
- Argyra sviridovae Selivanova & Negrobov, 2006
- Argyra takagii Negrobov & Satô, 2009
- Argyra thoracica Van Duzee, 1925
- Argyra tibetensis Wang, Chen & Yang, 2015
- Argyra ussuriana Negrobov, 1973
- Argyra utahna Harmston, 1951
- Argyra vanoyei (Parent, 1926)
- Argyra velutina Van Duzee, 1925
- Argyra venevitinovensis Selivanova & Negrobov, 2007
- Argyra vestita (Wiedemann, 1817)
- Argyra xanthopyga Negrobov & Grichanov, 2006
- Argyra xiaolongmensis Wang & Yang in Yang, Zhang, Wang & Zhu, 2011
- Argyra zlobini Negrobov, Satô & Selivanova, 2012

The following extinct species were originally placed in Argyra, but are currently considered unplaced in Dolichopodidae:

- †Argyra debellata Meunier, 1907
- †Argyra debilis Meunier, 1907
- †Argyra deceptoria Meunier, 1907

Other unrecognised species:

- Argyra diaphana (Fabricius, 1805) (junior homonym of Argyra diaphana (Fabricius, 1775))
- Argyra festivus Meigen, 1838
- Argyra spinipes (Meigen, 1830)
- Argyra spinipes Doleschall, 1856 (homonym of above)

The following species were renamed:

- Argyra splendida Van Duzee, 1925 (preoccupied by Argyra splendida De Meijere, 1919): renamed to Argyra splendens Van Duzee, 1933
- Dolichopus abdominalis Say, 1829 (preoccupied by Dolichopus abdominalis Fallén, 1823): renamed to Argyra medusae Gosseries, 1989
- Dolichopus confinis Zetterstedt, 1843 (preoccupied by Dolichopus confinis Walker, 1849): renamed to Argyra ilonae Gosseries, 1989
