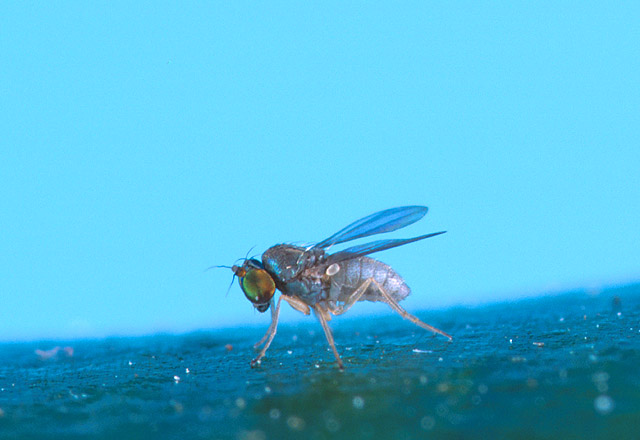

Scientific classification
- Kingdom: Animalia
- Phylum: Arthropoda
- Class: Insecta
- Order: Diptera
- Family: Dolichopodidae
- Subfamily: Medeterinae
- Genus: Thrypticus; Gerstäcker, 1864

Type species
- Thrypticus smaragdinus Gerstäcker, 1864

Diversity
- at least 90 species

Synonyms
- Aphantotimus Wheeler, 1890; Submedeterus Becker, 1917; Thripticus Loew, 1869; Xanthotricha Aldrich, 1896

= Thrypticus =

Genus of flies

Thrypticus is a genus of long-legged flies in the family Dolichopodidae. There are about 90 described species in Thrypticus. All known larvae of the genus are phytophagous stem-miners of plants in the families Cyperaceae, Poaceae, Juncaceae, and Pontederiaceae. Female adults have a strong, pointed ovipositor used to pierce and insert eggs in the stems of the plants.

== See also ==
- List of Thrypticus species
