= Ngirhaphium =

Scientific classification
- Kingdom: Animalia
- Phylum: Arthropoda
- Class: Insecta
- Order: Diptera
- Family: Dolichopodidae
- Subfamily: Rhaphiinae
- Genus: Ngirhaphium; Evenhuis & Grootaert, 2002

Type species
- Ngirhaphium murphyi Evenhuis & Grootaert, 2002

Genus of flies

Ngirhaphium is a genus of flies in the family Dolichopodidae. It includes six species known from mangroves in Southeast Asia. Ngirhaphium closely resembles the genus Rhaphium and was originally placed in the subfamily Rhaphiinae, though several molecular phylogenetic analyses were unable to resolve its phylogenetic position. The genus is named after Peter Kee Lin Ng, a professor at the National University of Singapore; the genus name combines the family name "Ng" and the generic name Rhaphium.

== Species ==
- Ngirhaphium caeruleum Grootaert & Puniamoorthy, 2014 – Singapore, Brunei (South China Sea)
- Ngirhaphium chutamasae Samoh, Boonrotpong & Grootaert, 2015 – Thailand (Satun) (Andaman Sea)
- Ngirhaphium meieri Samoh & Grootaert in Samoh, Satasook & Grootaert, 2019 – Thailand (Phang Nga, Ranong) (Andaman Sea)
- Ngirhaphium murphyi Evenhuis & Grootaert, 2002 – Singapore, southern Thailand (Andaman Sea)
- Ngirhaphium sivasothii Grootaert & Puniamoorthy, 2014 – Singapore, southern Thailand (Andaman Sea)
- Ngirhaphium thaicum Samoh & Grootaert in Samoh, Satasook & Grootaert, 2019 – Thailand (Trat, Prachuap Khiri Khan, Chumphon, Surat Thani), Cambodia (Gulf of Thailand)
