= Haromyia =

Scientific classification
- Kingdom: Animalia
- Phylum: Arthropoda
- Clade: Pancrustacea
- Class: Insecta
- Order: Diptera
- Family: Dolichopodidae
- Subfamily: incertae sedis
- Genus: Haromyia; Runyon, 2015
- Species: H. iviei

Binomial name
- Haromyia iviei Runyon, 2015

Genus of flies

Haromyia is a genus of flies in the family Dolichopodidae. It contains only one species, Haromyia iviei, known from Dominica. Flies in the genus and species have a small body size measuring between 1.0 and 1.5 mm in length, a bulging clypeus with six large setae, and wing veins that are nearly straight and evenly diverge from the base of the wing to the tip.

The genus does not currently fit into any established subfamily, although it superficially resembles both the Enliniinae and Achalcinae.

The genus is named after the botanist and entomologist Harold E. Robinson, for his works on Dolichopodidae. The species is named after the coleopterist Dr. Michael Ivie, who provided the only known specimens of the species.
