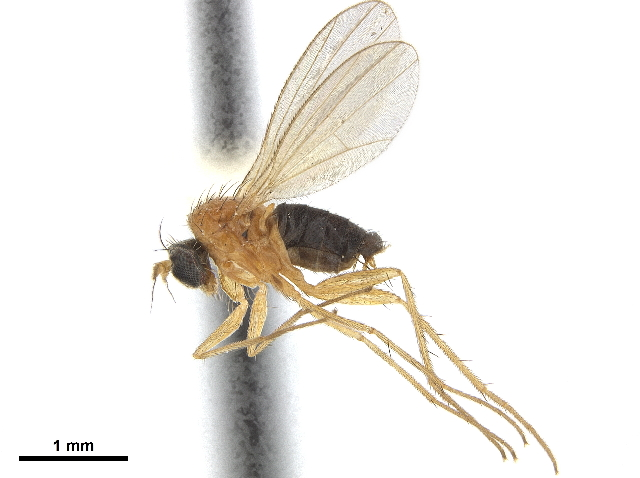
- Achalcus dytei

Scientific classification
- Domain: Eukaryota
- Kingdom: Animalia
- Phylum: Arthropoda
- Class: Insecta
- Order: Diptera
- Family: Dolichopodidae
- Subfamily: Achalcinae
- Genus: Achalcus; Loew, 1857

Type species
- Porphyrops flavicollis Meigen, 1824

Synonyms
- Clinocampsicnemus Vaillant & Brunhes, 1980

= Achalcus =

Genus of flies

Achalcus is a genus of flies in the family Dolichopodidae.

== Species ==
- Achalcus bicolor Pollet, 2005
- Achalcus bilineatus Pollet, 2005
- Achalcus bimaculatus Pollet, 1996
- Achalcus brevicornis Pollet, 2005
- Achalcus britannicus Pollet, 1996
- Achalcus californicus Pollet & Cumming, 1998
- Achalcus cinereus (Haliday, 1851)
- Achalcus costaricensis Pollet, 2005
- Achalcus cyanocephalus Pollet, 2005
- Achalcus dytei Pollet & Cumming, 1998
- Achalcus flavicollis (Meigen, 1824)
- Achalcus longicercus Pollet, 2005
- Achalcus maculipennis Pollet, 2005
- Achalcus micromorphoides Pollet, 2005
- Achalcus niger Pollet, 2005
- Achalcus nigropunctatus Pollet & Brunhes, 1996
- Achalcus oregonensis (Harmston & Miller, 1966)
- Achalcus phragmitidis Pollet, 1996
- Achalcus polleti Negrobov & Selivanova, 2010
- Achalcus similis Pollet & Cumming, 1998
- Achalcus thalhammeri Lichtwardt, 1913
- Achalcus tibialis Pollet, 2005
- Achalcus utahensis (Harmston & Miller, 1966)
- Achalcus vaillanti Brunhes, 1987

Unrecognised species:

- Achalcus scutellaris Van der Wulp, 1891

Nomina dubia:

- Achalcus thoracicus (Philippi, 1865)

The following species were transferred to the genus Australachalcus:

- Achalcus albipalpus Parent, 1931: now Australachalcus albipalpus (Parent, 1931)
- Achalcus brevinervis Van Duzee, 1930: now Australachalcus brevinervis (Van Duzee, 1930)
- Achalcus longicornis Van Duzee, 1930: now Australachalcus longicornis (Van Duzee, 1930)
- Achalcus edwardsae Van Duzee, 1930 (originally transferred to Enlinia): now Australachalcus edwardsae (Van Duzee, 1930)
- Achalcus melanotrichus Mik, 1878: now Australachalcus melanotrichus (Mik, 1878)
- Achalcus chaetifemoratus Parent, 1933: now Australachalcus chaetifemoratus (Parent, 1933)
- Achalcus luteipes Parent, 1933: now Australachalcus luteipes (Parent, 1933)
- Achalcus medius Parent, 1933: now Australachalcus medius (Parent, 1933)
- Achalcus minor Parent, 1933: now Australachalcus minor (Parent, 1933)
- Achalcus minusculus Parent, 1933: now Australachalcus minusculus (Parent, 1933)
- Achalcus minutus Parent, 1933: now Australachalcus minutus (Parent, 1933)
- Achalcus nigroscutatus Parent, 1933: now Australachalcus nigroscutatus (Parent, 1933)
- Achalcus relictus Parent, 1933: now Australachalcus relictus (Parent, 1933)
- Achalcus separatus Parent, 1933: now Australachalcus separatus (Parent, 1933)

Other synonyms:

- Achalcus atratus Van Duzee, 1930: transferred to Enlinia
- Achalcus caudatus Aldrich, 1902: synonym of Micromorphus albipes (Zetterstedt, 1843)
- Achalcus depuytoraci (Vaillant & Brunhes, 1980): synonym of A. cinereus (Haliday, 1851)
- Achalcus pallidus (Zetterstedt, 1843): synonym of A. flavicollis (Meigen, 1824)
- Achalcus pygmaeus (Zetterstedt, 1855): synonym of A. cinereus (Haliday, 1851)
- Achalcus sordidus Aldrich, 1896: transferred to Enlinia
- †Achalcus latipennis Meunier, 1907: transferred to Medeterites

The following species have been placed by some authors in this genus in error:

- Achalcus calcaratus Becker, 1918: actually Eutarsus calcaratus (a synonym of Syntormon (Drymonoeca) aulicus) in Syntormon
- Achalcus pallipes Olejnichek & Bartak, 1997: actually Systenus pallipes in Systenus
