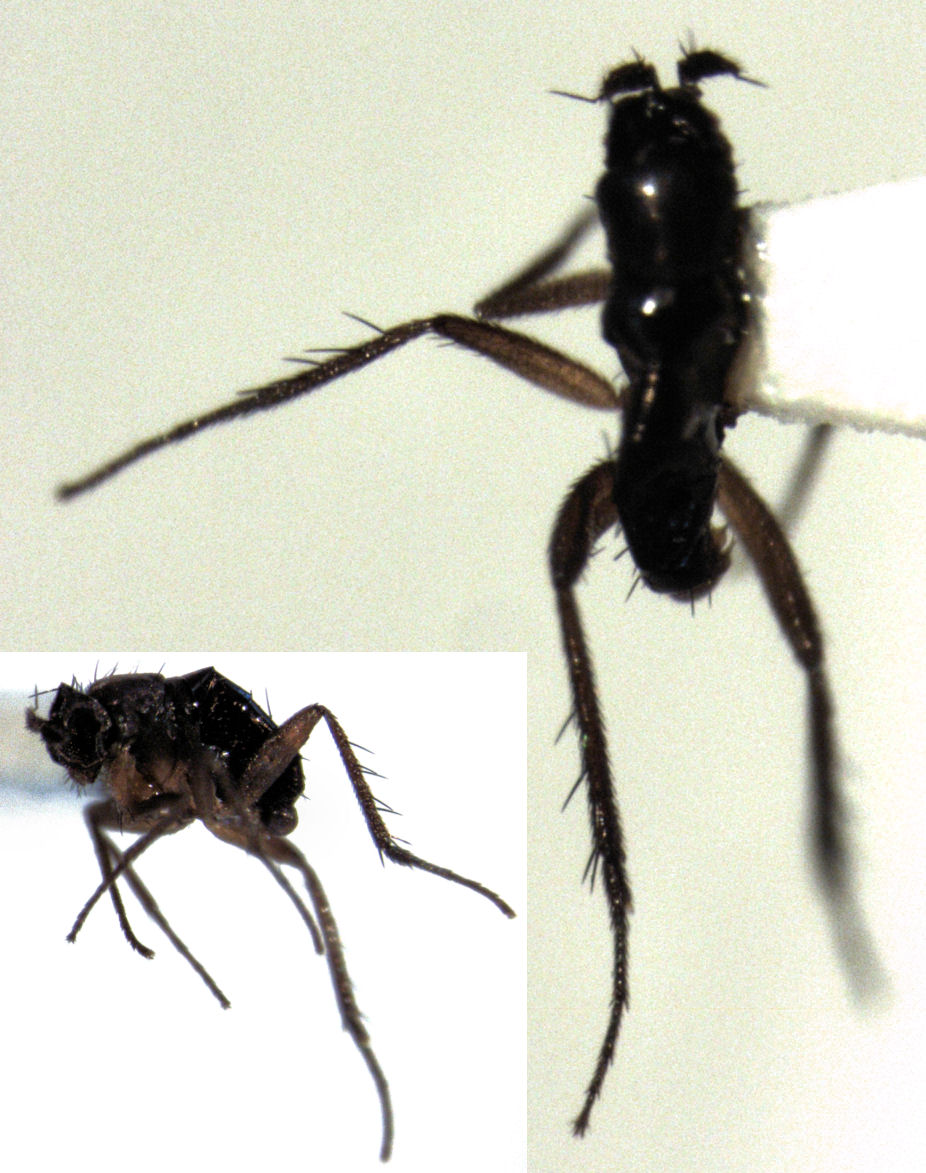
- Apterachalcus borboroides, male (body length about 1.2 mm)

Conservation status
- Naturally Uncommon (NZ TCS)

Scientific classification
- Kingdom: Animalia
- Phylum: Arthropoda
- Class: Insecta
- Order: Diptera
- Family: Dolichopodidae
- Subfamily: Achalcinae
- Genus: Apterachalcus; Bickel, 1992
- Species: A. borboroides

Binomial name
- Apterachalcus borboroides (Oldroyd, 1955)

Synonyms
- Acropsilus borboroides Oldroyd, 1955

= Apterachalcus =

Genus of flies

Apterachalcus is a genus of flies in the family Dolichopodidae. It has only one described species, Apterachalcus borboroides, known from New Zealand. It was originally described by Harold Oldroyd in 1955, who placed the species in Acropsilus. However, Daniel J. Bickel determined that the species did not belong to Acropsilus, and created a new genus for it in 1991.

It is wingless and somewhat laterally compressed, giving it a somewhat flea-like appearance. It has been found in the Auckland Islands and Campbell Island in the New Zealand subantarctic. This or closely related undescribed species have also been found at high altitude above the Paparoa Range and Stewart Island.

The generic name is derived from the stem apter- of apteros (Greek for "wingless") and Achalcus, the name of a closely related genus.
