= Poecilobothrus majesticus =

Conservation status
- Extinct (after 1907) (IUCN 3.1)

Scientific classification
- Kingdom: Animalia
- Phylum: Arthropoda
- Class: Insecta
- Order: Diptera
- Family: Dolichopodidae
- Genus: Poecilobothrus
- Species: †P. majesticus

Binomial name
- †Poecilobothrus majesticus d'Assis-Fonseca, 1976

Extinct species of fly

Poecilobothrus majesticus is an extinct species of fly in the family Dolichopodidae that was endemic to Great Britain. The species is known from a single male specimen collected near the Essex coast in Walton-on-the-Naze in 1907, and it was formally described by E. C. M. d'Assis-Fonseca in 1976. It has not been recorded for over 100 years, so it is therefore considered to be extinct.

== History of research ==
The holotype and only known specimen of P. majesticus, an adult male, was collected from Walton-on-the-Naze in 1907. Many years later, D'Assis-Fonseca rediscovered this specimen deposited in the Oxford University Museum of Natural History, in the Verrall-Collin collection of the Hope Department. In 1976, D'Assis-Fonseca published a formal description of a new species based on the specimen, named Poecilobothrus majesticus. He reported that it had a label identifying it as Poecilobothrus bigoti, but stated that it didn't fit Josef Mik's original description of that species. He also stated that the only Palaearctic species of Poecilobothrus that the specimen resembled was Poecilobothrus basilicus, but that it differed enough from it to be considered a distinct species.

A 2018 report reviewing the conservation status of Dolichopodidae in Great Britain concluded that P. majesticus was "Regionally Extinct", justifying the status by stating that the species had not been recorded for over 100 years despite the recording effort within the Essex coast. In 2022, the species was classified on the IUCN Red List as extinct.
