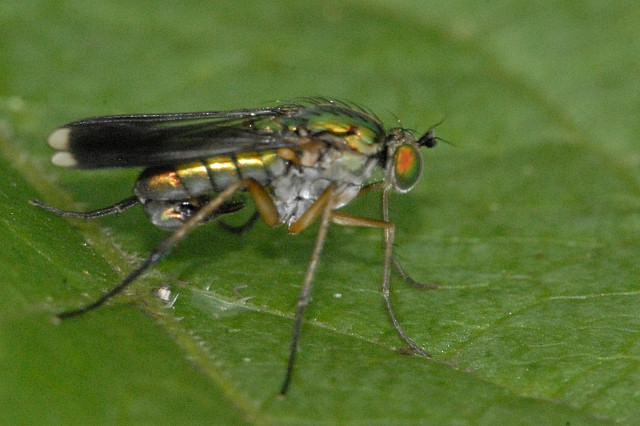
- P. nobilitatus

Scientific classification
- Kingdom: Animalia
- Phylum: Arthropoda
- Clade: Pancrustacea
- Class: Insecta
- Order: Diptera
- Family: Dolichopodidae
- Subfamily: Dolichopodinae
- Genus: Poecilobothrus; Mik, 1878

Type species
- Dolichopus regalis Meigen, 1824

Synonyms
- Achanthipodus Rondani, 1856 (nomen oblitum); Pterostylus Mik, 1878; Acanthipodus Bigot, 1890 (unjustified emendation of Achanthipodus); Acanthipodus Kertész, 1909 (unjustified emendation of Achanthipodus); Chaetosphyria Enderlein, 1936

= Poecilobothrus =

Genus of flies

Poecilobothrus is a genus of flies in the family Dolichopodidae.

== Species ==
- Poecilobothrus aberrans (Loew, 1871) – Tajikistan
- Poecilobothrus annulitarsis Kazerani, Pollet & Khaghaninia in Kazerani, Khaghaninia, Talebi, Persson & Pollet, 2017 – Iran
- Poecilobothrus appendiculatus (Loew, 1859) – France, Spain, Czech Republic, Algeria, Morocco, Tunisia
- Poecilobothrus armeniorum (Stackelberg, 1933) – Armenia, Azerbaijan, Russia
- Poecilobothrus basilicus (Loew, 1869) – Azerbaijan, Iran, Israel, Italy, Turkey
- Poecilobothrus bigoti Mik, 1883 – France, Romania, Russia, Spain, Turkey
- Poecilobothrus brunus (Wei, 1997) – China (Guizhou)
- Poecilobothrus caucasicus (Stackelberg, 1933) – Armenia, Georgia, Kyrgyzstan, Southern Russia, Turkey
- Poecilobothrus chrysozygos (Wiedemann, 1817) – Europe
- †Poecilobothrus ciliatus Meunier, 1907 – Baltic amber, Eocene
- Poecilobothrus clarus (Loew, 1871) – Tajikistan
- Poecilobothrus comitialis (Kowarz, 1867) – Europe, Iran
- Poecilobothrus cucullus (Wei, 1997) – China (Guizhou)
- Poecilobothrus cyaneculus (Wei, 1997) – China (Guizhou, Yunnan)
- Poecilobothrus ducalis (Loew, 1857) – Europe, North Africa
- Poecilobothrus flaveolus (Negrobov & Chalaya, 1987) – China, Japan, Russian Far East
- Poecilobothrus flavifemoratus Grichanov & Tonguc, 2010 – Turkey
- Poecilobothrus innotabilis Kazerani, Pollet & Khaghaninia in Kazerani, Khaghaninia, Talebi, Persson & Pollet, 2017 – Iran
- Poecilobothrus lii (Yang, 1996) – China, Nepal
- Poecilobothrus longipilosus (Yang & Saigusa, 2001) – China (Guizhou)
- Poecilobothrus lorestanicus Grichanov & Ahmadi, 2016 – Iran
- Poecilobothrus luchunensis (Yang & Saigusa, 2001) – China (Yunnan)
- †Poecilobothrus majesticus d'Assis-Fonseca, 1976 – England
- Poecilobothrus mentougouensis (Zhang, Yang & Grootaert, 2003) – China (Beijing)
- Poecilobothrus nobilitatus (Linnaeus, 1767) – Europe
- Poecilobothrus palustris (Wei, 2006) – China (Guizhou)
- Poecilobothrus potanini (Stackelberg, 1933) – China (Sichuan)
- Poecilobothrus principalis (Loew, 1861) – Europe, Turkey, Israel
- Poecilobothrus pterostichoides (Stackelberg, 1934) – China, Russian Far East
- Poecilobothrus regalis (Meigen, 1824) – Europe, Turkey, Iran
- Poecilobothrus saetosus (Yang & Saigusa, 2002) – China (Shaanxi)
- Poecilobothrus singularis (Yang & Saigusa, 2001) – China (Yunnan)
- Poecilobothrus varicoloris (Becker, 1917) – Armenia, Georgia, South Russia, Turkey
- Poecilobothrus zhejiangensis (Yang, 1997) – China (Zhejiang)

Unrecognised species:

- Poecilobothrus fumipennis (Stannius, 1831)
- Poecilobothrus infuscatus (Stannius, 1831)
