= Xanthina =

Scientific classification
- Domain: Eukaryota
- Kingdom: Animalia
- Phylum: Arthropoda
- Class: Insecta
- Order: Diptera
- Family: Dolichopodidae
- Subfamily: Achalcinae
- Genus: Xanthina; Aldrich, 1902

Type species
- Xanthina plumicauda Aldrich, 1902

Genus of flies

Xanthina is a genus of flies in the family Dolichopodidae.

== Species ==
- Xanthina acuticornis Robinson, 1975
- Xanthina attenuata Robinson, 2003
- Xanthina dominicensis Robinson, 1975
- Xanthina flagellifera Robinson, 2003
- Xanthina flava (Aldrich, 1896)
- Xanthina nigromaculata Van Duzee, 1931
- Xanthina persetosa Robinson, 1975
- Xanthina plumicauda Aldrich, 1902
- Xanthina rubromarginata Robinson, 1975
- Xanthina schildi Robinson, 2003
- Xanthina squamifera Robinson, 2003
- Xanthina subcurva Van Duzee, 1931
- Xanthina turrialbae Robinson, 2003
