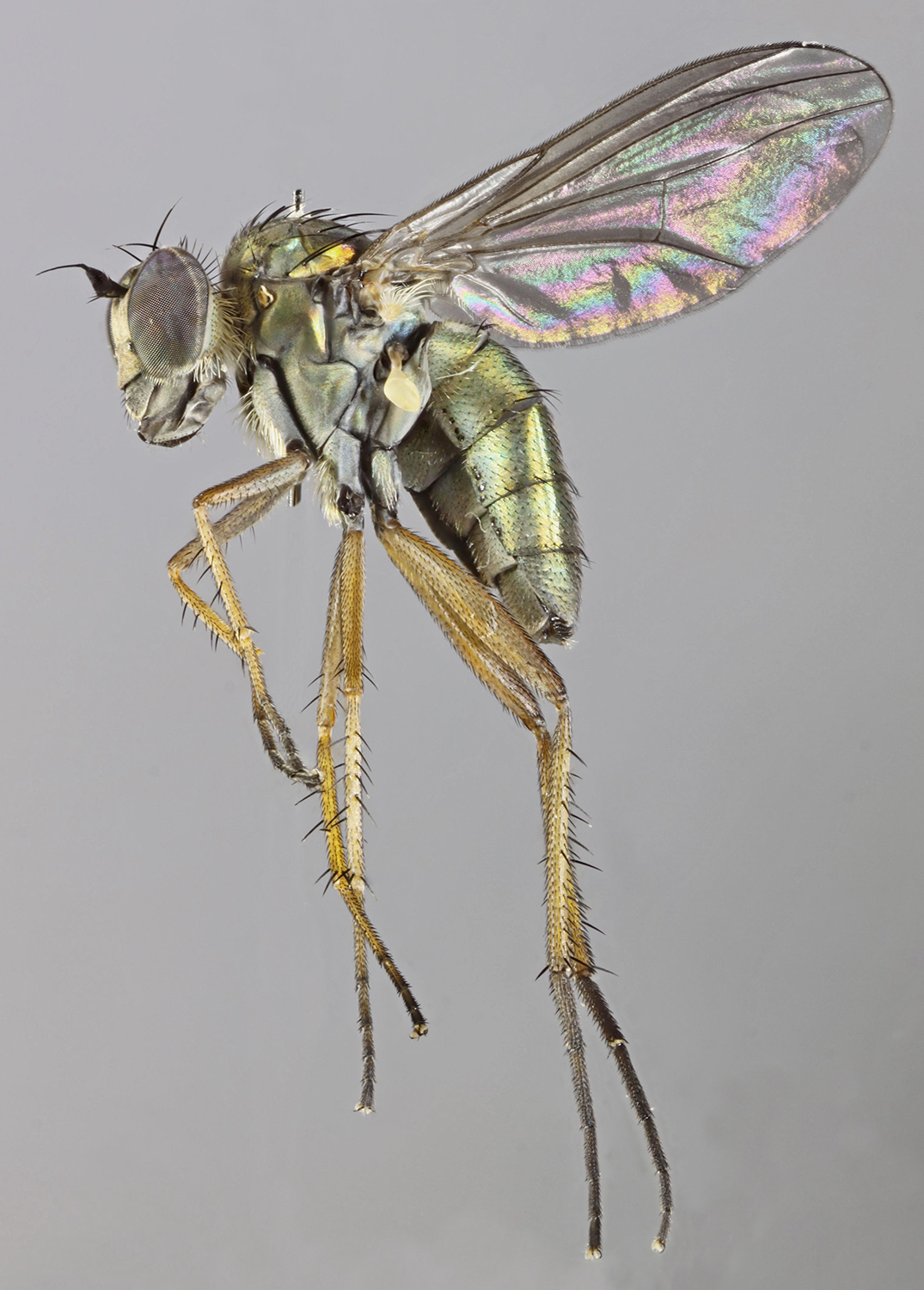
- Rhaphium discolor North Wales

Scientific classification
- Kingdom: Animalia
- Phylum: Arthropoda
- Class: Insecta
- Order: Diptera
- Family: Dolichopodidae
- Genus: Rhaphium
- Species: R. discolor

Binomial name
- Rhaphium discolor Zetterstedt, 1838

Synonyms
- Rhaphium riparium Parent, 1938; Rhaphium fulvipes Haliday, 1851; Porphyrops consobrinus Zetterstedt, 1843; Rhaphium consobrinum Zetterstedt, 1843; Porphyrops rufipes Haliday, 1832; Rhaphium rufipes (Haliday, 1832)

= Rhaphium discolor =

Species of fly

Rhaphium discolor is a species of fly in the family Dolichopodidae. It is found in the Palearctic.
