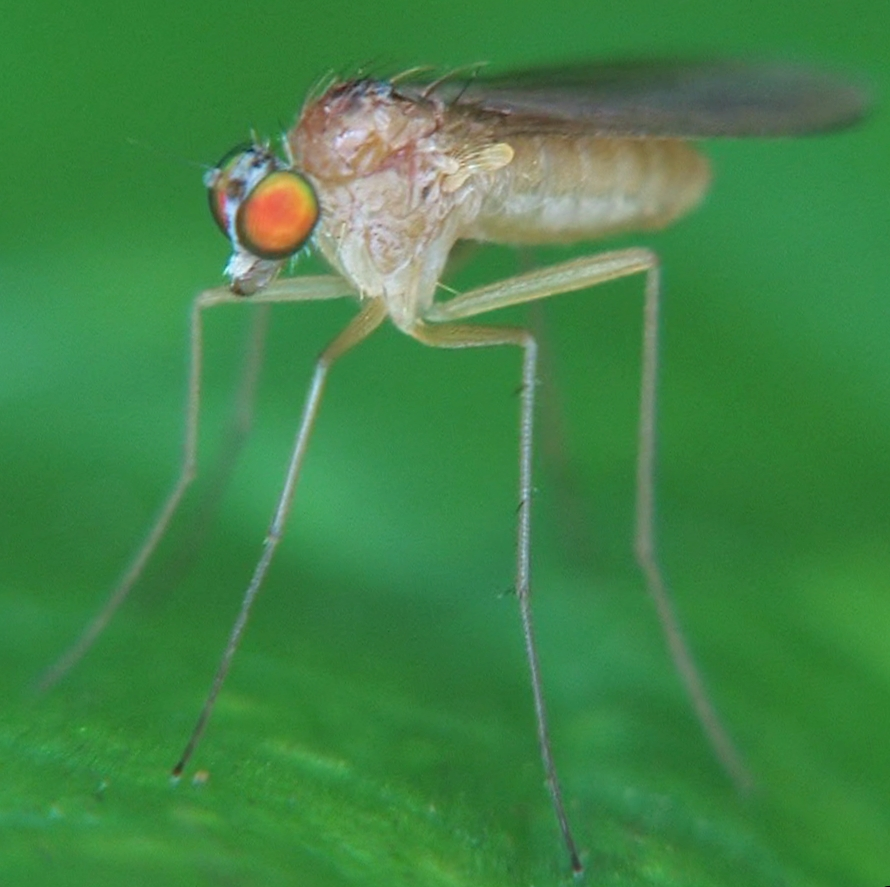
- Xanthochlorus sp.

Scientific classification
- Kingdom: Animalia
- Phylum: Arthropoda
- Clade: Pancrustacea
- Class: Insecta
- Order: Diptera
- Family: Dolichopodidae
- Subfamily: Xanthochlorinae; Aldrich, 1905
- Genus: Xanthochlorus; Loew, 1857

Type species
- Porphyrops ornata Haliday, 1832

Synonyms
- Medeterus (Leptopus) Haliday, 1832 (nec Latreille, 1809, nec Fallén, 1823)

= Xanthochlorus =

Xanthochlorus Temporal range: Upper Oligocene–Present

Genus of flies

Xanthochlorus sp. on Impatiens

Xanthochlorus is a genus of flies in the family Dolichopodidae. It is the only member of the subfamily Xanthochlorinae. In some classifications, the genus is included in the subfamily Sympycninae.

== Species ==
- Xanthochlorus chinensis Yang & Saigusa, 2005 – China (Shaanxi)
- Xanthochlorus flavicans Negrobov, 1978 – Tajikistan
- Xanthochlorus fulvus Negrobov, 1978 – South Russia
- Xanthochlorus galbanus Chandler & Negrobov, 2008 – Belgium, Denmark, Hungary, Italy, Russia (Kaliningrad), Great Britain
- Xanthochlorus gansuensis Qilemoge, Chang & Yang, 2018 – China (Gansu)
- Xanthochlorus helvinus Loew, 1861 – United States, Canada
- Xanthochlorus henanensis Wang, Yang & Grootaert, 2008 – China (Henan)
- Xanthochlorus kustovi Grichanov, 2010 – Madagascar
- Xanthochlorus lucidulus Negrobov, 1978 – Kazakhstan, Uzbekistan, Tajikistan
- Xanthochlorus luridus Negrobov, 1978 – Abkhazia, South Russia
- Xanthochlorus nigricilius Olejníček, 2004 – China (Shaanxi)
- Xanthochlorus ochraceus Vaillant, 1952 – Algeria
- Xanthochlorus ornatus (Haliday, 1832) – Europe, Egypt, Canary Islands
- Xanthochlorus philippovi Negrobov, 1978 – Russia (Primorye)
- Xanthochlorus silaceus Chandler & Negrobov, 2008 – Great Britain
- †Xanthochlorus statzi Chandler & Negrobov, 2008 – Germany (Upper Oligocene) (replacement name for X. tenellus Statz, 1940)
- Xanthochlorus tenellus (Wiedemann, 1817) – Europe
- Xanthochlorus tewoensis Qilemoge, Chang & Yang, 2018 – China (Gansu)
- Xanthochlorus tibetensis Xi, Wang & Yang, 2015 – China (Tibet)
- Xanthochlorus ultramontanus Becker, 1918 – France

Synonyms:

- Xanthochlorus bicolorellus (Zetterstedt, 1843): moved to Syntormon
- Xanthochlorus flavellus (Zetterstedt, 1843): Synonym of Xanthochlorus tenellus (Wiedemann, 1817)
- Xanthochlorus tarsatus Schiner, 1868 [Type locality: Nicobar Islands: Pulomilo Island]: moved to Chaetogonopteron
- †Xanthochlorus tenellus Statz, 1940: renamed to Xanthochlorus statzi Chandler & Negrobov, 2008
- Xanthochlorus tenellus (Fallén, 1823): Synonym of Xanthochlorus ornatus (Haliday, 1832)

Nomen nudum:

- Xanthochlorus carthusianus Vaillant, 1978
