= Enliniinae =

Scientific classification
- Kingdom: Animalia
- Phylum: Arthropoda
- Class: Insecta
- Order: Diptera
- Family: Dolichopodidae
- Subfamily: Enliniinae; Robinson, 1970

Genera
- see text

Subfamily of flies

Enliniinae is a subfamily of flies in the family Dolichopodidae.

== Genera ==
- Enlinia Aldrich, 1933
- Harmstonia Robinson, 1964
- Haromyia Runyon, 2015 (incertae sedis – Eniliniinae or Achalcinae)
