= Physopyga =

Scientific classification
- Kingdom: Animalia
- Phylum: Arthropoda
- Class: Insecta
- Order: Diptera
- Family: Dolichopodidae
- Subfamily: Rhaphiinae
- Genus: Physopyga; Grootaert & Meuffels, 1990
- Species: P. miranda

Binomial name
- Physopyga miranda Grootaert & Meuffels, 1990

Genus of flies

Physopyga is a genus of flies in the family Dolichopodidae found in mangroves in Papua New Guinea. It contains a single species, Physopyga miranda.
