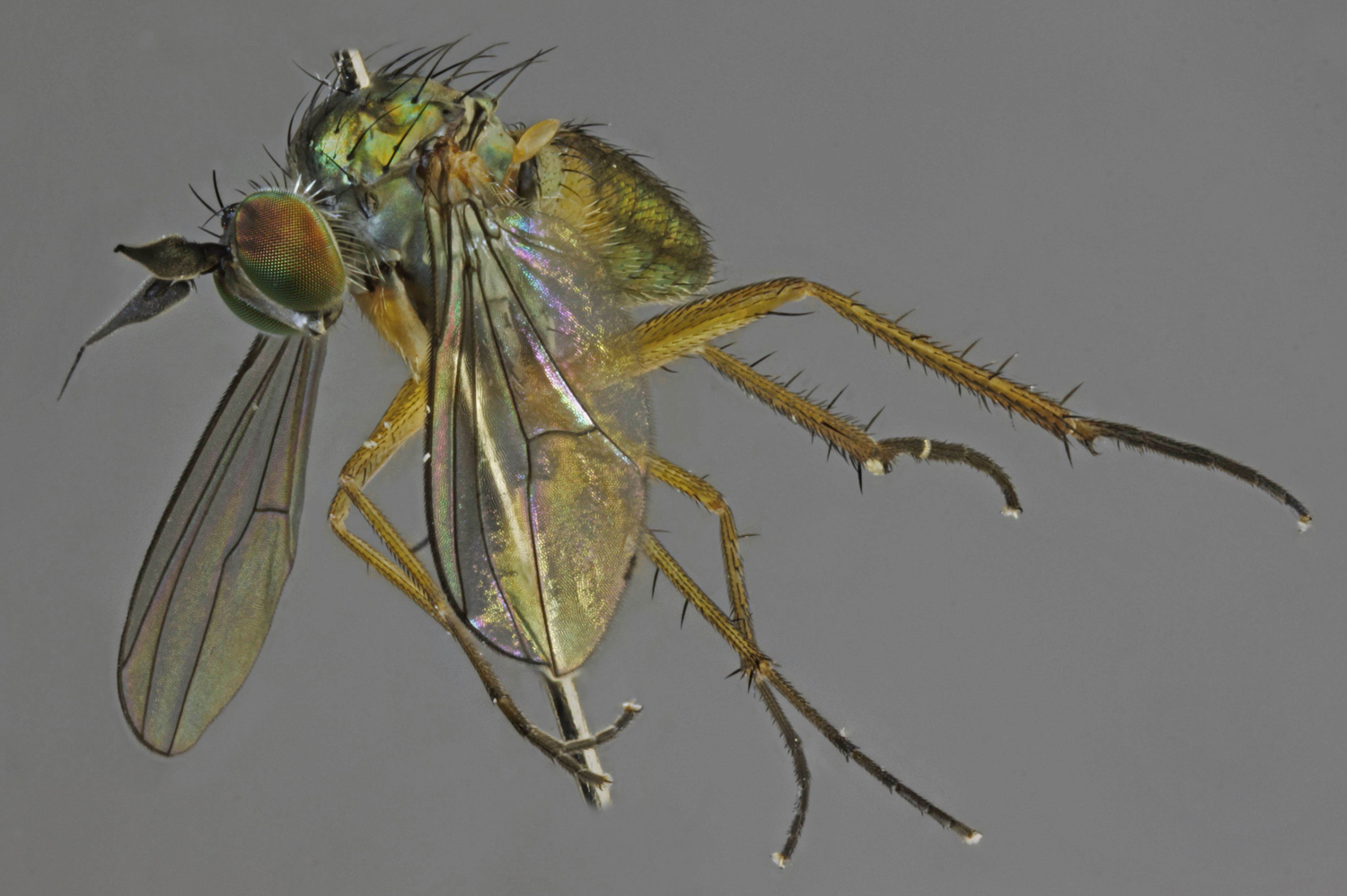
- Syntormon pallipes North Wales

Scientific classification
- Kingdom: Animalia
- Phylum: Arthropoda
- Class: Insecta
- Order: Diptera
- Family: Dolichopodidae
- Genus: Syntormon
- Species: S. pallipes

Binomial name
- Syntormon pallipes (Fabricius, 1794)

Synonyms
- Musca pallipes Fabricius, 1794; Rhaphium hamatus Zetterstedt, 1843; Syntormon pallipes var. immaculatus Santos Abreu, 1929; ?Syntormon pallipes var. uncitarsis Becker, 1902

= Syntormon pallipes =

Species of fly

Syntormon pallipes is a species of fly in the family Dolichopodidae. It is found in the Palearctic, Oriental and Afrotropical realms. In 2019, the mitochondrial genome of S. pallipes was sequenced, as the first representative of the subfamily Sympycninae.

Syntormon pseudospicatus is sometimes treated as a synonym of S. pallipes, but they are argued by Drake (2020) to be distinct species.

A subspecies named Syntormon pallipes longistylus was described by Igor Grichanov from Madagascar in 2001. In 2020, it was determined that this subspecies was in fact a distinct species, Syntormon longistylus.
