= Enlinia =

Scientific classification
- Kingdom: Animalia
- Phylum: Arthropoda
- Class: Insecta
- Order: Diptera
- Family: Dolichopodidae
- Subfamily: Enliniinae
- Genus: Enlinia; Aldrich, 1933

Type species
- Collinellula magistri Aldrich, 1932

Synonyms
- Collinellula Aldrich, 1932 (nec Strand, 1928)

Genus of flies

Enlinia is a genus of flies in the family Dolichopodidae. Flies in the genus are tiny, with a body length of around 1 mm. The genus is restricted to the New World. There are about 89 species described in the genus.

The genus was originally known as Collinellula, named by John Merton Aldrich in 1932. It was named in honor of J. E. Collin, who collected a specimen of the type species, Collinellula magistri (the specific name was also chosen to celebrate the ability of this collector). However, Collinellula was found to be preoccupied, so the genus was renamed to Enlinia by Aldrich in 1933, in honor of G. Enderlein, another collector of the type species.

== Species ==
- Enlinia acuticornis Robinson, 1969
- Enlinia albipes Robinson, 1969
- Enlinia angustifacies Robinson, 1969
- Enlinia anomalipennis Robinson, 1969
- Enlinia arborea Robinson, 1975
- Enlinia arizonica Robinson, 1973
- Enlinia armata Robinson, 1969
- Enlinia atrata (Van Duzee, 1930)
- Enlinia biobio Runyon & Pollet, 2019
- Enlinia bova Runyon & Pollet, 2018
- Enlinia brachychaeta Robinson, 1969
- Enlinia bredini Robinson, 1975
- Enlinia brevipes Robinson, 1969
- Enlinia caburnica (Botosaneanu & Vaillant, 1973)
- Enlinia californica Robinson & Arnaud, 1970
- Enlinia cataractarum Robinson, 1975
- Enlinia caudata Robinson, 1969
- Enlinia chaetophora Robinson, 1969
- Enlinia chilensis Runyon & Pollet, 2019
- Enlinia ciliata Robinson, 1964
- Enlinia ciliifemorata Robinson, 1969
- Enlinia clavulifera Robinson, 1969
- Enlinia colossicornis Runyon & Pollet, 2018
- Enlinia convergens Robinson, 1969
- Enlinia crassipes Robinson, 1975
- Enlinia crassitibia Robinson, 1975
- Enlinia crinita Robinson, 1969
- Enlinia cristata Robinson, 1969
- Enlinia dalensi Runyon & Pollet, 2018
- Enlinia distincta Robinson, 1969
- Enlinia dominicensis Robinson, 1975
- Enlinia elegans Robinson, 1969
- Enlinia elongata Robinson, 1969
- Enlinia enormis Runyon & Pollet, 2019
- Enlinia escambraica Botosaneanu & Vaillant, 1973
- Enlinia exigua Robinson, 1969
- Enlinia farri Robinson, 1975
- Enlinia fasciata Robinson, 1969
- Enlinia femorata Robinson, 1969
- Enlinia fimbriata Robinson, 1969
- Enlinia flavicornis Robinson, 1969
- Enlinia frontalis Robinson, 1969
- Enlinia fusca Robinson, 1969
- Enlinia halteralis Robinson, 1969
- Enlinia hirtipes Robinson, 1969
- Enlinia hirtitarsis Robinson, 1969
- Enlinia interrupta Robinson, 1969
- Enlinia isoloba Runyon & Pollet, 2019
- Enlinia jamaicensis Robinson, 1975
- Enlinia lamellata Robinson, 1969
- Enlinia larondei Robinson, 1975
- Enlinia latifacies Robinson, 1969
- Enlinia latipennis Robinson, 1969
- Enlinia lobata Robinson, 1969
- Enlinia loboptera Runyon & Pollet, 2018
- Enlinia maculata Robinson, 1969
- Enlinia magistri (Aldrich, 1932)
- Enlinia magnicornis Robinson, 1969
- Enlinia marginata Robinson, 1969
- Enlinia maxima Robinson, 1969
- Enlinia media Robinson, 1969
- Enlinia mitarakensis Runyon & Pollet, 2018
- Enlinia montana Robinson, 1969
- Enlinia nigricans Robinson, 1969
- Enlinia obovata Robinson, 1969
- Enlinia ornata Robinson, 1969
- Enlinia panamensis Robinson, 1975
- Enlinia patellitarsis Robinson, 1975
- Enlinia piedrana Botosaneanu & Vaillant, 1973
- Enlinia plumicauda Robinson, 1969
- Enlinia ramosa Robinson, 1969
- Enlinia robinsoni Steyskal, 1975
- Enlinia saxicola Robinson, 1964
- Enlinia scabrida Robinson, 1969
- Enlinia scutitarsis Robinson, 1969
- Enlinia seriata Robinson, 1969
- Enlinia seticauda Robinson, 1969
- Enlinia setosa Robinson, 1969
- Enlinia simplex Robinson, 1969
- Enlinia sordida (Aldrich, 1896)
- Enlinia spinimana Botosaneanu & Vaillant, 1973
- Enlinia taeniocaudata Robinson & Arnaud, 1970
- Enlinia texana Robinson, 1973
- Enlinia tibialis Robinson, 1969
- Enlinia touroulti Runyon & Pollet, 2018
- Enlinia tuberosa Botosaneanu & Vaillant, 1973
- Enlinia unisetosa Robinson, 1969
- Enlinia ventralis Robinson, 1969
- Enlinia wirthi Robinson, 1975

Enlinia edwardsae (Van Duzee, 1930) (originally from Achalcus) is now a synonym of Australachalcus edwardsae (Van Duzee, 1930)
