= Rhaphium pectinatum =

Scientific classification
- Kingdom: Animalia
- Phylum: Arthropoda
- Class: Insecta
- Order: Diptera
- Family: Dolichopodidae
- Genus: Rhaphium
- Species: R. pectinatum

Binomial name
- Rhaphium pectinatum (Loew, 1859)

Synonyms
- Porphyrops pectinata Loew, 1859

Species of fly

Rhaphium pectinatum is a species of long-legged fly in the family Dolichopodidae. It is distributed in Europe.

== Distribution ==
R. pectinatum has been recorded from Austria, England, France, Hungary, Italy, Poland, Romania, Russia and Sweden.

On 25 June 2015, a single male specimen was caught by Robert J. Wolton at the Devon Wildlife Trust's Old Sludge Beds reserve, on the outskirts of Exeter in Devon, England. The species was previously presumed to be extinct in Britain, as it had not been recorded in the country since 1868, when George Henry Verrall caught a male and female at Richmond in south-west London.
