= Achalcus flavicollis =

Scientific classification
- Kingdom: Animalia
- Phylum: Arthropoda
- Class: Insecta
- Order: Diptera
- Family: Dolichopodidae
- Genus: Achalcus
- Species: A. flavicollis

Binomial name
- Achalcus flavicollis (Meigen, 1824)

Synonyms
- Achalcus pallidus (Zetterstedt, 1843); Porphyrops flavicollis Meigen, 1824; Rhaphium pallidum Zetterstedt, 1843

Species of fly

Achalcus flavicollis is a species of fly belonging to the family Dolichopodidae. It is native to Europe.
