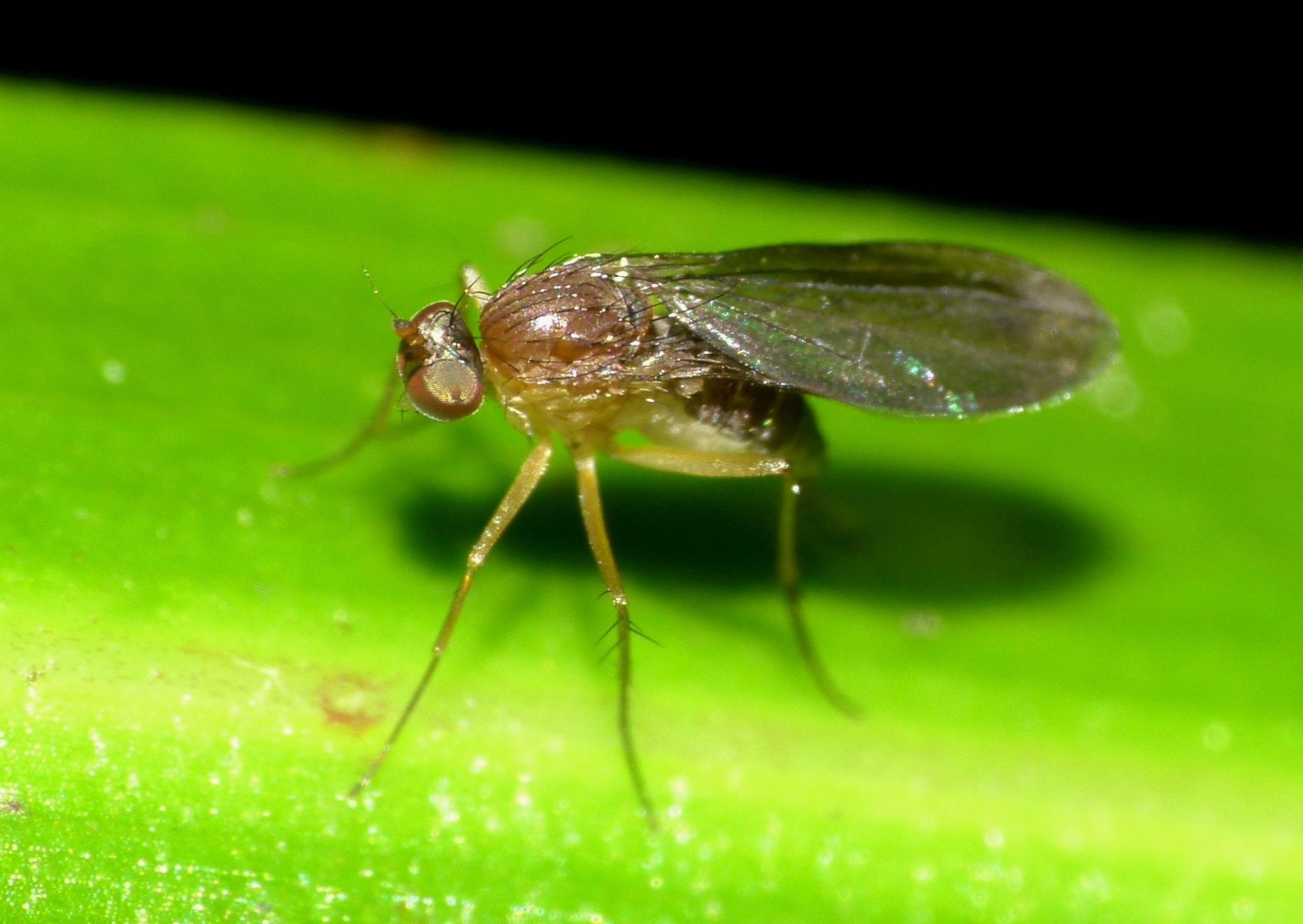
- Australachalcus medius

Scientific classification
- Kingdom: Animalia
- Phylum: Arthropoda
- Class: Insecta
- Order: Diptera
- Family: Dolichopodidae
- Subfamily: Achalcinae
- Genus: Australachalcus; Pollet, 2005

Type species
- Achalcus albipalpus Parent, 1931

= Australachalcus =

Genus of flies

Australachalcus is a genus of flies in the family Dolichopodidae. It is very closely related to the genus Achalcus, in which some of its species were originally placed. The name Australachalcus ("southern Achalcus") refers to the southern hemisphere, where the genus reaches its highest levels of species richness.

== Species ==
- Australachalcus acornis Pollet, 2005
- Australachalcus albipalpus (Parent, 1931)
- Australachalcus brevinervis (Van Duzee, 1930)
- Australachalcus browni Pollet, 2005
- Australachalcus chaetifemoratus (Parent, 1933)
- Australachalcus cummingi Pollet, 2005
- Australachalcus edwardsae (Van Duzee, 1930)
- Australachalcus incisicornis Pollet, 2005
- Australachalcus japonicus Pollet & Stark, 2005
- Australachalcus latipennis Pollet, 2005
- Australachalcus longicornis (Van Duzee, 1930)
- Australachalcus luteipes (Parent, 1933)
- Australachalcus medius (Parent, 1933)
- Australachalcus melanotrichus (Mik, 1878)
- Australachalcus minor (Parent, 1933)
- Australachalcus minusculus (Parent, 1933)
- Australachalcus minutus (Parent, 1933)
- Australachalcus nigroscutatus (Parent, 1933)
- Australachalcus pseudorobustus Pollet, 2005
- Australachalcus relictus (Parent, 1933)
- Australachalcus robustus Pollet, 2005
- Australachalcus separatus (Parent, 1933)
- Australachalcus setosus Pollet, 2005
- Australachalcus variabilis Pollet, 2005
