= Phacaspis =

Scientific classification
- Kingdom: Animalia
- Phylum: Arthropoda
- Class: Insecta
- Order: Diptera
- Family: Dolichopodidae
- Subfamily: Kowmunginae
- Genus: Phacaspis; Meuffels & Grootaert, 1988

Type species
- Phacaspis petiolata Meuffels & Grootaert, 1988

Genus of flies

Phacaspis is a genus of flies in the family Dolichopodidae. It is known from Southeast Asia, Papua New Guinea and Micronesia. Flies in the genus are small (less than 2 mm long), with metallic green coloring. They are marine, and are commonly found on mudflats in front of mangroves.

The generic name is derived from the Ancient Greek phaktós ("lens") and aspís ("round shield" or clypeus), referring to the swollen lens-shaped clypeus.

The genus was originally regarded as incertae sedis within the family Dolichopodidae. In the World Catalog of Dolichopodidae (Insecta: Diptera) by Yang et al. (2006), the new subfamily Kowmunginae was proposed to include both Kowmungia and Phacaspis. This placement was later criticized by Sinclair et al. (2008), who suggested that the genus would have been better placed as incertae sedis until a later phylogenetic study determines its placement.

== Species ==
The genus contains four species:

- Phacaspis mitis Grootaert & Meuffels, 2001 – Thailand
- Phacaspis ornata Meuffels & Grootaert, 1988 – Papua New Guinea
- Phacaspis palauensis Bickel, 2023 – Federated States of Micronesia (Yap), Palau
- Phacaspis petiolata Meuffels & Grootaert, 1988 – Papua New Guinea, Thailand
