= Harmstonia =

Scientific classification
- Kingdom: Animalia
- Phylum: Arthropoda
- Class: Insecta
- Order: Diptera
- Family: Dolichopodidae
- Subfamily: Enliniinae
- Genus: Harmstonia; Robinson, 1964

Type species
- Harmstonia intricata Robinson, 1964

Genus of flies

Harmstonia is a genus of flies in the family Dolichopodidae.

== Species ==
- Harmstonia acuta Robinson, 1975
- Harmstonia attenuata Robinson, 1967
- Harmstonia clavicauda Robinson, 1967
- Harmstonia costaricensis Robinson, 1967
- Harmstonia ichilo Robinson & Woodley, 2005
- Harmstonia intricata Robinson, 1964
- Harmstonia jamaicensis Robinson, 1975
- Harmstonia megalopyga Robinson, 1967
- Harmstonia obscura Robinson, 1967
- Harmstonia ornata Robinson, 1967
- Harmstonia pallida Robinson, 1967
- Harmstonia panamensis Robinson, 1975
- Harmstonia pectinicauda Robinson, 1964
- Harmstonia pubescens Robinson, 1967
- Harmstonia recta Robinson, 1967
- Harmstonia setosa Robinson, 1967
- Harmstonia simplex Robinson, 1967
- Harmstonia wirthi Robinson, 1975
