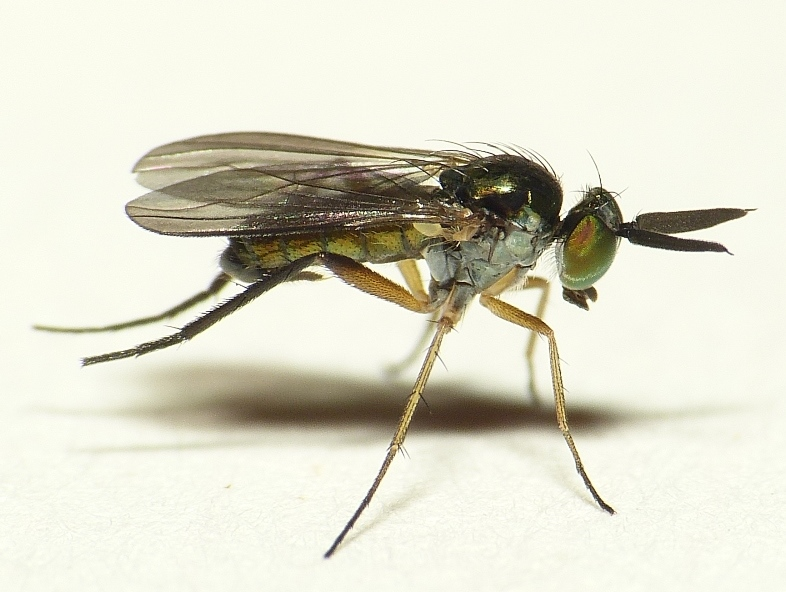
- Rhaphium appendiculatum

Scientific classification
- Kingdom: Animalia
- Phylum: Arthropoda
- Class: Insecta
- Order: Diptera
- Family: Dolichopodidae
- Subfamily: Rhaphiinae; Bigot, 1852

Genera
- see text

= Rhaphiinae =

Subfamily of flies

Rhaphiinae is a subfamily of flies in the family Dolichopodidae.

== Genera ==
- Haplopharyngomyia Meuffels & Grootaert, 1999 (subfamily incertae sedis)
- Nematoproctus Loew, 1857 (Diaphorinae or Rhaphiinae)
- Ngirhaphium Evenhuis & Grootaert, 2002
- Physopyga Grootaert & Meuffels, 1990
- Rhaphium Meigen, 1803
- Urodolichus Lamb, 1922 (Diaphorinae or Rhaphiinae)
