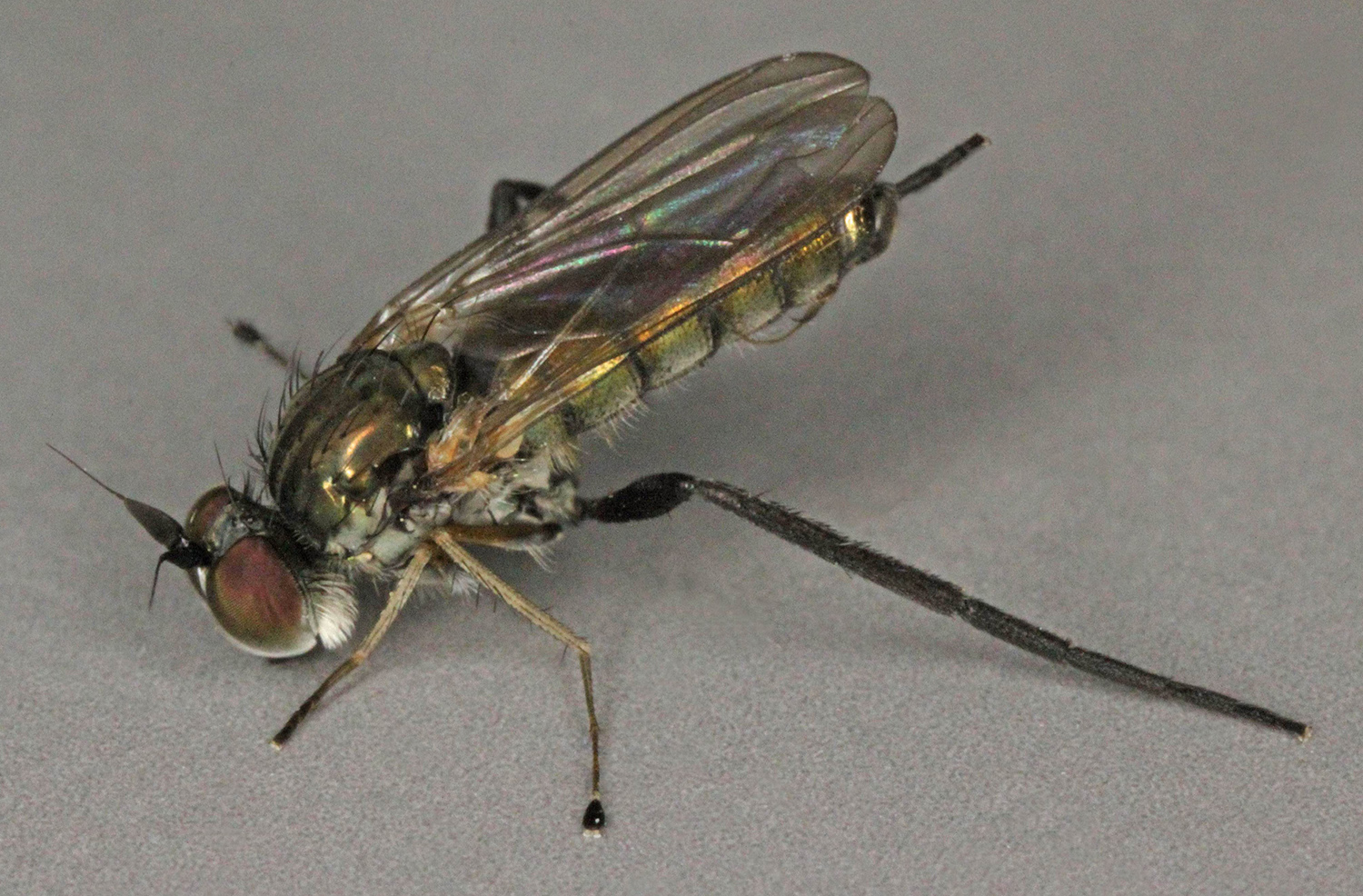
- Rhaphium crassipes North Wales

Scientific classification
- Kingdom: Animalia
- Phylum: Arthropoda
- Class: Insecta
- Order: Diptera
- Family: Dolichopodidae
- Genus: Rhaphium
- Species: R. crassipes

Binomial name
- Rhaphium crassipes Meigen, 1824

= Rhaphium crassipes =

Species of fly

Rhaphium crassipes is a species of fly in the family Dolichopodidae. It is found in the Palearctic.
