= Scepastopyga =

Scientific classification
- Domain: Eukaryota
- Kingdom: Animalia
- Phylum: Arthropoda
- Class: Insecta
- Order: Diptera
- Family: Dolichopodidae
- Subfamily: Achalcinae
- Genus: Scepastopyga; Grootaert & Meuffels, 1997
- Species: S. semiflava

Binomial name
- Scepastopyga semiflava Grootaert & Meuffels, 1997

Genus of flies

Scepastopyga is a genus of flies in the family Dolichopodidae. There is only one described species, Scepastopyga semiflava, which was described from Papua New Guinea by Patrick Grootaert and Henk J. G. Meuffels in 1997. An unidentified species of Scepastopyga was reported from Singapore in 2002, which is thought to show that the genus may be distributed across the Malesian Archipegalo. The fly is small, with a body length of about 2 mm, and is coloured yellow or brown without a metallic gloss.

The generic name is derived from the Ancient Greek words σκεπαστός (skepastós, "covered") and πυγή (pūgḗ, "rump").
