= Kowmungia =

Scientific classification
- Kingdom: Animalia
- Phylum: Arthropoda
- Clade: Pancrustacea
- Class: Insecta
- Order: Diptera
- Family: Dolichopodidae
- Subfamily: Kowmunginae
- Genus: Kowmungia; Bickel, 1987

Type species
- Kowmungia nigrifemorata Bickel, 1987

Genus of flies

Kowmungia is a genus of flies in the family Dolichopodidae. It is known from Australia.

The genus was originally regarded as incertae sedis within the family Dolichopodidae, as it did not fit into any previously described subfamily. In the World Catalog of Dolichopodidae (Insecta: Diptera) by Yang et al. (2006), the new subfamily Kowmunginae was proposed to include both Kowmungia and Phacaspis. This placement was later criticized by Sinclair et al. (2008), who suggested that the genus would have been better placed as incertae sedis until a later phylogenetic study determines its placement.

== Species ==
The genus contains four species:

- Kowmungia angustifrons Bickel, 1987
- Kowmungia crassitarsus Bickel, 1987
- Kowmungia flaviseta Bickel, 1987
- Kowmungia nigrifemorata Bickel, 1987
