= Xanthochlorus helvinus =

Scientific classification
- Kingdom: Animalia
- Phylum: Arthropoda
- Clade: Pancrustacea
- Class: Insecta
- Order: Diptera
- Family: Dolichopodidae
- Genus: Xanthochlorus
- Species: X. helvinus

Binomial name
- Xanthochlorus helvinus Loew, 1861

Species of fly

Xanthochlorus helvinus is a species of long-legged fly in the family Dolichopodidae.
