= Urodolichus =

Scientific classification
- Kingdom: Animalia
- Phylum: Arthropoda
- Class: Insecta
- Order: Diptera
- Family: Dolichopodidae
- Subfamily: incertae sedis
- Genus: Urodolichus; Lamb, 1922

Type species
- Urodolichus porphyropoides Lamb, 1922

Synonyms
- Mischopyga Grootaert & Meuffels, 1990; Ounyana Hollis, 1964

Genus of flies

Urodolichus is a genus of fly in the family Dolichopodidae. It is known from the Afrotropical realm (Seychelles and Madagascar), Indomalayan realm and Australasian realm (New Guinea). It has been placed in either Rhaphiinae or Diaphorinae, though Grichanov & Brooks (2017) consider the genus to be incertae sedis within the family Dolichopodidae.

== Species ==
- Urodolichus artifacies (Grootaert & Meuffels, 1990) – Papua New Guinea
- Urodolichus caudatus Lamb, 1922 – Seychelles
- Urodolichus gracilis Lamb, 1922 – Seychelles
- Urodolichus iulilamellatus (Wei, 2006) – China (Guizhou)
- Urodolichus javanus (De Meijere, 1916) – Indonesia (Java)
- Urodolichus keiseri (Hollis, 1964) – India (Goa), Malaysia (Sabah), Philippines, Sri Lanka, Vietnam
- Urodolichus kubani (Olejníček, 2002) – Cambodia, Laos
- Urodolichus lambi Grichanov, 1998 – Madagascar
- Urodolichus ninae Grichanov, 1998 – Madagascar
- Urodolichus porphyropoides Lamb, 1922 – Seychelles
- Urodolichus villosiceps Grichanov, Capellari & Bickel, 2016 – Indonesia (West Papua), Papua New Guinea
