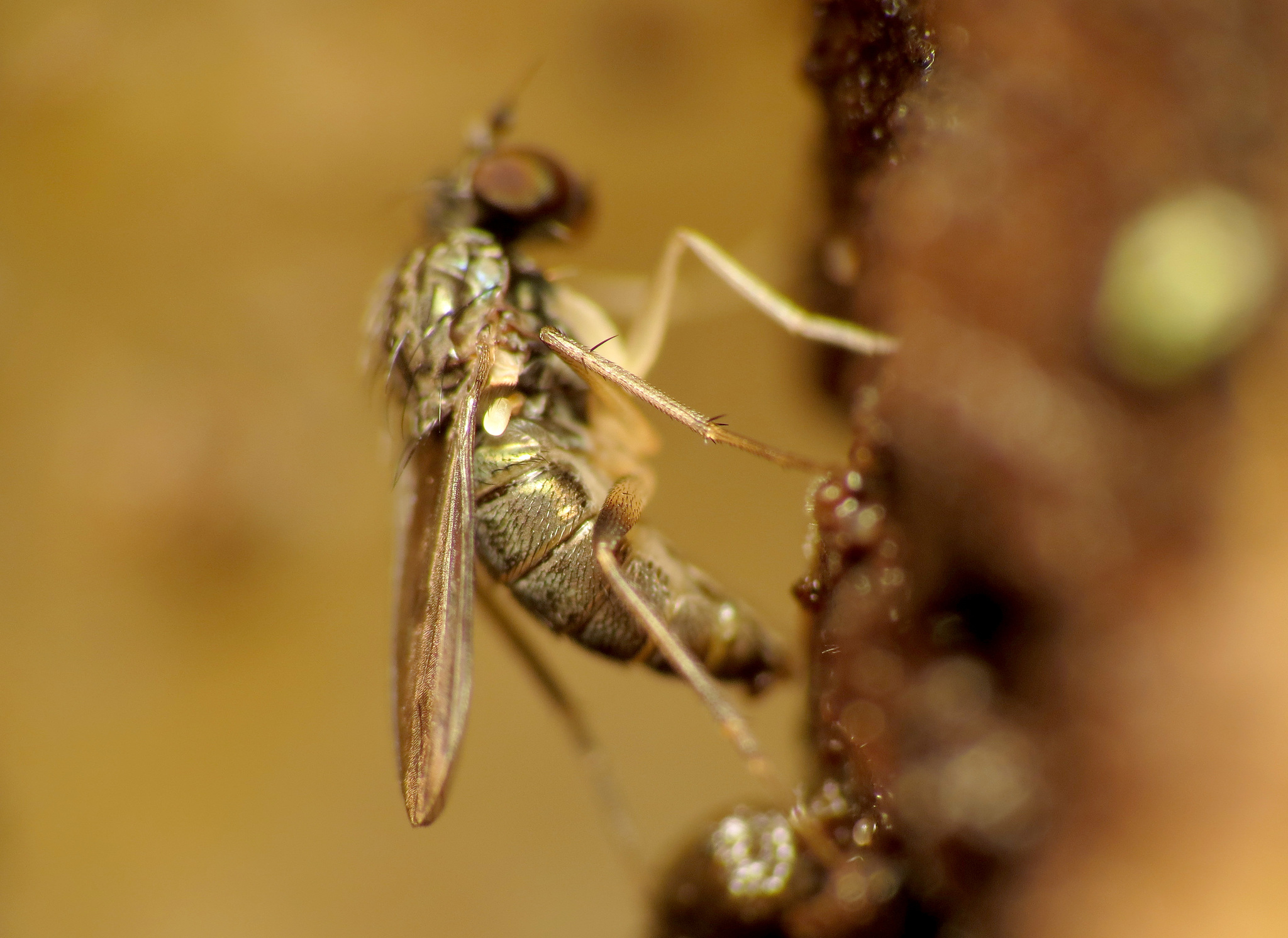
- Systenus albimanus

Scientific classification
- Kingdom: Animalia
- Phylum: Arthropoda
- Class: Insecta
- Order: Diptera
- Family: Dolichopodidae
- Subfamily: Medeterinae
- Tribe: Systenini
- Genus: Systenus; Loew, 1857

Type species
- Rhaphium adpropinquans Loew, 1857

= Systenus =

Genus of flies

Systenus is a genus of flies in the family Dolichopodidae.

== Species ==
- Systenus africanus Grichanov in Grichanov & Mostovski, 2009
- Systenus albimanus Wirth, 1952
- Systenus amazonicus Naglis, 2000
- Systenus apicalis Wirth, 1952
- Systenus australis Bickel, 1986
- Systenus bartaki Naglis, 2017
- Systenus beatae Naglis, 2000
- Systenus bipartitus (Loew, 1850)
- Systenus californicus Harmston, 1968
- Systenus curryi Bickel, 1986
- Systenus divericatus Bickel, 2015
- Systenus eboritibia Bickel, 2015
- Systenus emusorum Bickel, 2015
- Systenus eucercus Steyskal, 1970
- Systenus flaviatus Naglis, 2000
- Systenus flavifemoratus Bickel, 2015
- Systenus flavimaculatus Negrobov, 2005
- Systenus ladonnae Runyon, 2020
- Systenus leucurus Loew, 1859
- Systenus maculipennis Bickel, 2015
- Systenus mallochi MacGowan, 1997
- Systenus minutus (Van Duzee, 1913)
- Systenus naranjensis Bickel, 2015
- Systenus nigriatus Naglis, 2000
- Systenus pallipes (von Roser, 1840)
- Systenus parkeri Bickel, 2015
- †Systenus penicillatus Meunier, 1907
- Systenus rafaeli Naglis, 2000
- Systenus raptor Becker, 1922
- Systenus rarus Naglis, 2000
- Systenus sachalinensis Negrobov & Shamshev, 1985
- Systenus scholtzi (Loew, 1850)
- Systenus shannoni Wirth, 1952
- Systenus sinensis Yang & Gaimari, 2004
- Systenus slovaki Olejníček & Kozánek, 1997
- Systenus slovakiensis Negrobov, Manko & Oboňa, 2020
- Systenus tener Loew, 1859
- Systenus tenorio Bickel, 2015
- Systenus vasilii Grichanov, 2002
- Systenus zurqui Bickel, 2015

Unplaced species in Dolichopodidae:

- †Systenus ciliatus Meunier, 1907

Synonyms:

- Systenus alpinus Vaillant, 1978: Synonym of Systenus scholtzi (Loew, 1850)
- Systenus americanus Van Duzee, 1914: Synonym of Rhaphium melampus (Loew, 1861)
- Systenus lamelliger Muller, 1924: Synonym of Sybistroma inornatus (Loew, 1857)
- Systenus obscurior Becker, 1918: Synonym of Sybistroma inornatus (Loew, 1857)
- Systenus ornatus Mik, 1866: Synonym of Oncopygius distans (Loew, 1857)
- Systenus pallidus Vaillant, 1978: Synonym of Systenus pallipes (von Roser, 1840)
