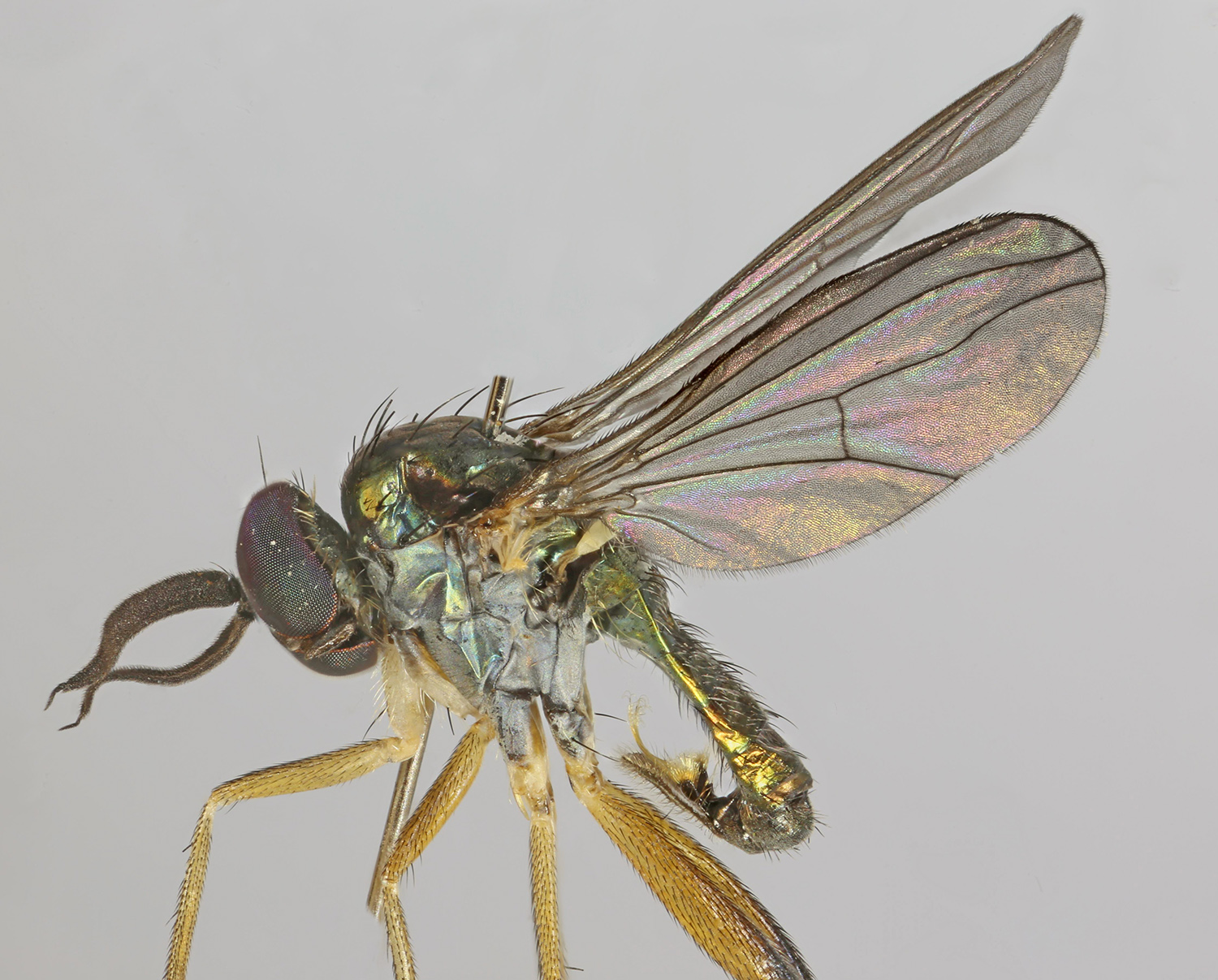
- Rhaphium appendiculatum North Wales

Scientific classification
- Kingdom: Animalia
- Phylum: Arthropoda
- Class: Insecta
- Order: Diptera
- Family: Dolichopodidae
- Genus: Rhaphium
- Species: R. appendiculatum

Binomial name
- Rhaphium appendiculatum Zetterstedt, 1849

Synonyms
- Xiphandrium anale Becker, 1918; Rhaphium macrocerum Meigen, 1824 sensu Parent, 1925 (misidentification)

= Rhaphium appendiculatum =

Species of fly

Rhaphium appendiculatum is a species of fly in the family Dolichopodidae. It is found in the Palearctic.
