= Kowmunginae =

Scientific classification
- Domain: Eukaryota
- Kingdom: Animalia
- Phylum: Arthropoda
- Class: Insecta
- Order: Diptera
- Family: Dolichopodidae
- Subfamily: Kowmunginae; Yang, Zhu, Wang & Zhang, 2006

Genera
- see text

Subfamily of flies

Kowmunginae is a subfamily of flies in the family Dolichopodidae. It was proposed in the World Catalog of Dolichopodidae (Insecta: Diptera) by Yang et al. (2006) to include two genera previously placed as incertae sedis within the family. However, the validity of this new subfamily was later criticized by Sinclair et al. (2008). According to them, the subfamily's erection by Yang et al. (2006) was not justified by their phylogenetic analysis, and the genera included would have been better placed as incertae sedis until a later phylogenetic study determines their placement.

== Genera ==
The subfamily contains two genera:

- Kowmungia Bickel, 1987
- Phacaspis Grootaert & Meuffels, 1988
