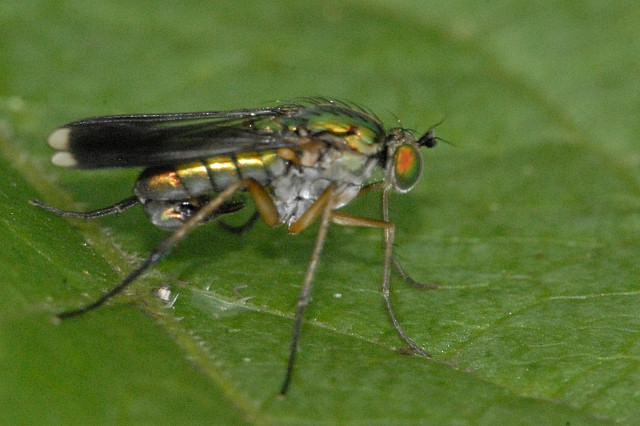
- P. nobilitatus

Scientific classification
- Kingdom: Animalia
- Phylum: Arthropoda
- Clade: Pancrustacea
- Class: Insecta
- Order: Diptera
- Family: Dolichopodidae
- Genus: Poecilobothrus
- Species: P. nobilitatus

Binomial name
- Poecilobothrus nobilitatus (Linnaeus, 1767)

Synonyms
- Musca joco Harris, 1780; Musca ludicra Harris, 1780; Musca nobilitata Linnaeus, 1767; Dolichopus plumicornis Meigen, 1824

= Poecilobothrus nobilitatus =

Species of fly

Poecilobothrus nobilitatus or semaphore fly is a species of fly in the highly studied family Dolichopodidae. P. nobilitatus flies are popular study subjects because they are easy to recognize and are of large size. They mainly reside around ponds and wet lands, where most of their hunting and mating take place. Their mating ritual is highly studied due to their distinctive mate selection behaviors.

== Range ==
P. nobilitatus has been found in Austria, Belgium, Czech Republic, Denmark, France, Germany, Hungary, Ireland, Italy, Luxembourg, Netherlands, Poland, Romania, Russia, Slovakia, Spain, Sweden, Switzerland, and the UK.

== Appearance ==
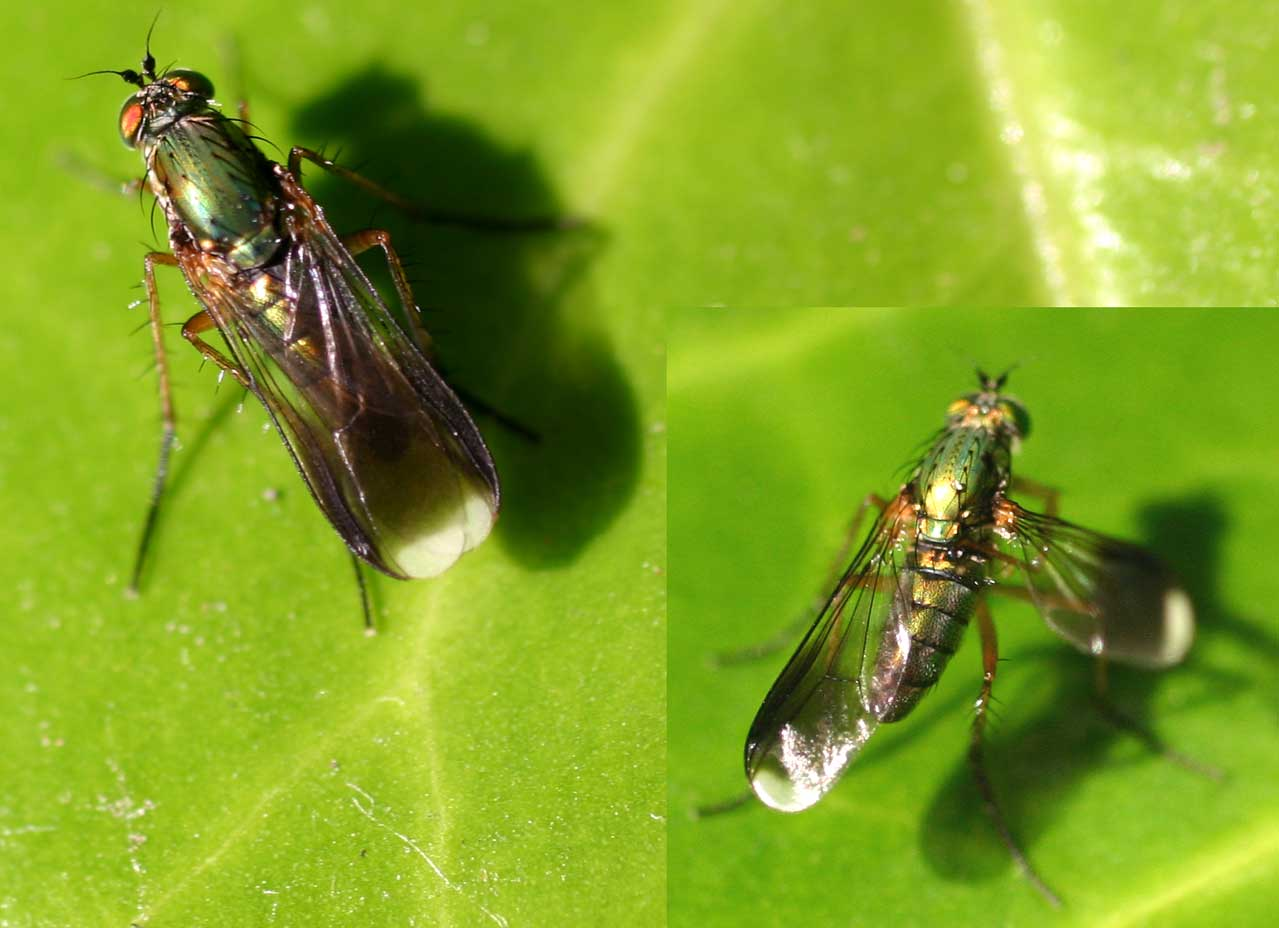
Poecilobothrus nobilitatus sitting on leaf

Many flies in the Dolichopodidae family have metallic green reflections in their cornea due to the cornea's wavelength-selective spectral reflectance. Their cornea is built like a multi-layered mirror that reduces the transmission of green light to the cornea's light receptors. This results in distinctive green iridescent eyes that many of the flies have.

=== Sexual dimorphism ===
The P. nobilitatus species exhibits sexual dimorphism; females and males have distinctive wing markings. Males are usually 7mm long and are smoky black on the distal half of their wings and white on the tips. Their thorax and abdomen are a shiny golden green. Males tend to be bigger than the females and usually have a wing length of 5.7± 0.4mm, whereas females have a wingspan of 5.2± .03mm. The wing spread of males is about 1mm larger than that of similarly sized females. Reproducing males have a larger wingspan length of 6.0±0.3mm compared to randomly caught males that have a wingspan length of 5.7±0.4mm. In the Dolichopodidae family, there is a lot of diversity in the male signaling organs. The differences in the signaling organs can be found on the antennae, all legs, the wings, the cerci, and certain abdominal projections.

== Reproductive behaviors ==
=== Courtship ===
Poecilobothrus nobilitatus has one of the most complicated courtships studied by researchers. Courtship for males is focused on a single female, and the presence of other males can strongly affect a female's choice. This can cause courtship to be a mutual choice rather than a combination of successive choices. The length of the courtship display is determined by individual courtship phases, less repetition of the courtship phases, and possible interruption by male competition. For example, in the presence of many females and males, the courting males might delay courtship in favor of time-consuming, male-male interactions. If the female is feeding on prey, the male will court the female for a longer amount of time.

During this courtship males perform an aerial display just for the female they are interested in. The courtship starts with the male doing short intervals of wing waving, and then he hovers in front of the female. This display is then followed by two types of aerial displays, one where the male will make a circle arc around one side of the area and in the second aerial display the male will fly over the females rotating 180 degrees.

Females take no obvious part in the courtship, except to terminate it by flying away. Females prefer to mate with larger males.

==== Stages of courtship ====
The courtship has several stages. Mating is initiated when the walking male makes a quick turn to face the female. The male then extends and vibrates his wings. There can be up to 20 wing-waving displays, punctuated by rests where the male might take a small side step if the female isn’t moving. After wing waving the male will take off and he then hovers for a little in front of the female or starts to display flight.

=== Male chasing ===
Male chasing is a part of courtship for the Poecilobothrus nobilitatus species. Males pursue members of both sexes during courtship displays around the edges of ponds. Male Poecilobothrus nobilitatus participate in two types of male chasing. There are "flat out chases" with other males, in which males chase other males using rotation and fast forward flight. There are also less aggressive chasing methods that males do to females for courtship called “shadowing”. They follow the females at a distance of a couple of centimeters doing rotational and lateral movements during flight.

=== Reproduction ===
Successful reproduction requires cooperation from the female that has been courted. She has to slightly spread her wings so that copulation can start. Similar to other flies in the Dolichopodidae family, the males' hypopygium is very prominent and movable by an intra-abdominal joint linked with a 180° inversion and the bending of the abdomen to start copulation.

== Hunting ==
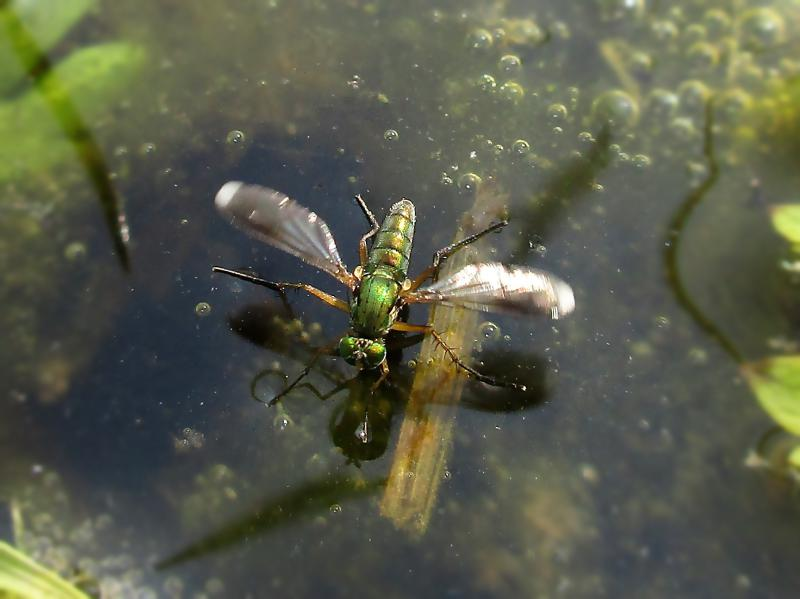
P. nobilitatus capturing prey on the water's surface

P. nobilitatus flies are considered predators and hunt on the surface of ponds and wetlands. Both males and females settle on the surface of the water, and they do a series of short flights hovering about 3-6 inches over the water. They settle on the water after each flight. Males are more likely to detect possible prey before females, but females are more likely to start feeding on prey before males. In studies, the flies don't seem particularly interested in the food source and only tend to capture the larvae when they are close by.

=== Food sources ===
P. nobilitatus' diet consists of small crustaceans, insects, potworms and Culex pipiens larvae. Most of their food sources are found in the water.

=== Hunting strategy ===
When the Culex larvae break the water's surface to get air, the P. nobilitatus will attack with its mouth. After a short struggle the larvae will be carried on the wing of the fly and put into the mud where the fly will eat it.

== Popular study subjects ==
The Poecilobothrus nobilitatus is a popular fly for animal study because of its relatively large size, evident sexual dimorphism in wing markings, and its courtship and hunting displays on a 2-dimensional surface (water), allowing for more accurate and easy studying of the species. Most of the study surrounding Poecilobothrus nobilitatus is filmed and the size and the habitat of the fly makes it easier to study them on film.
