= Rhaphium melampus =

Scientific classification
- Domain: Eukaryota
- Kingdom: Animalia
- Phylum: Arthropoda
- Class: Insecta
- Order: Diptera
- Family: Dolichopodidae
- Genus: Rhaphium
- Species: R. melampus

Binomial name
- Rhaphium melampus (Loew, 1861)

Synonyms
- Porphyrops melampus Loew, 1861; Systenus americanus Van Duzee, 1914

Species of fly

Rhaphium melampus is a species of long-legged fly in the family Dolichopodidae.
