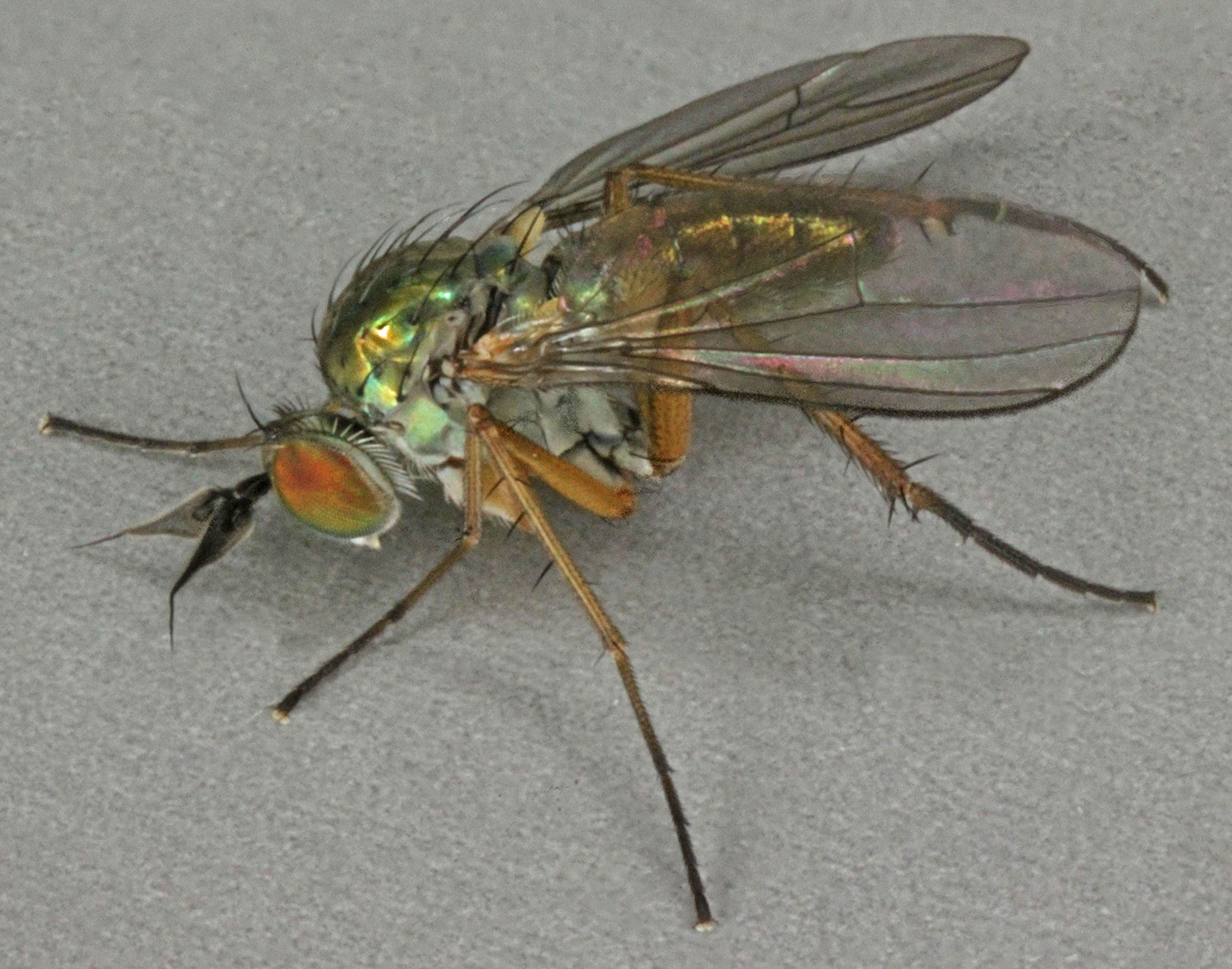
- Syntormon pallipes, North Wales

Scientific classification
- Kingdom: Animalia
- Phylum: Arthropoda
- Clade: Pancrustacea
- Class: Insecta
- Order: Diptera
- Family: Dolichopodidae
- Subfamily: Sympycninae
- Genus: Syntormon; Loew, 1857

Type species
- Rhaphium metathesis Loew, 1857

Synonyms
- Bathycranium Strobl, 1892; Eutarsus Loew, 1857 (nec Hessling, 1852); Plectropus Haliday, 1832 (nec Kirby, 1826); Synarthrus Loew, 1857; Ceratopos Vaillant, 1952

= Syntormon =

Genus of flies

Syntormon is a genus of flies in the family Dolichopodidae. It includes about 110 species worldwide, more than 50 of which were described from the Palaearctic realm.

== Etymology ==
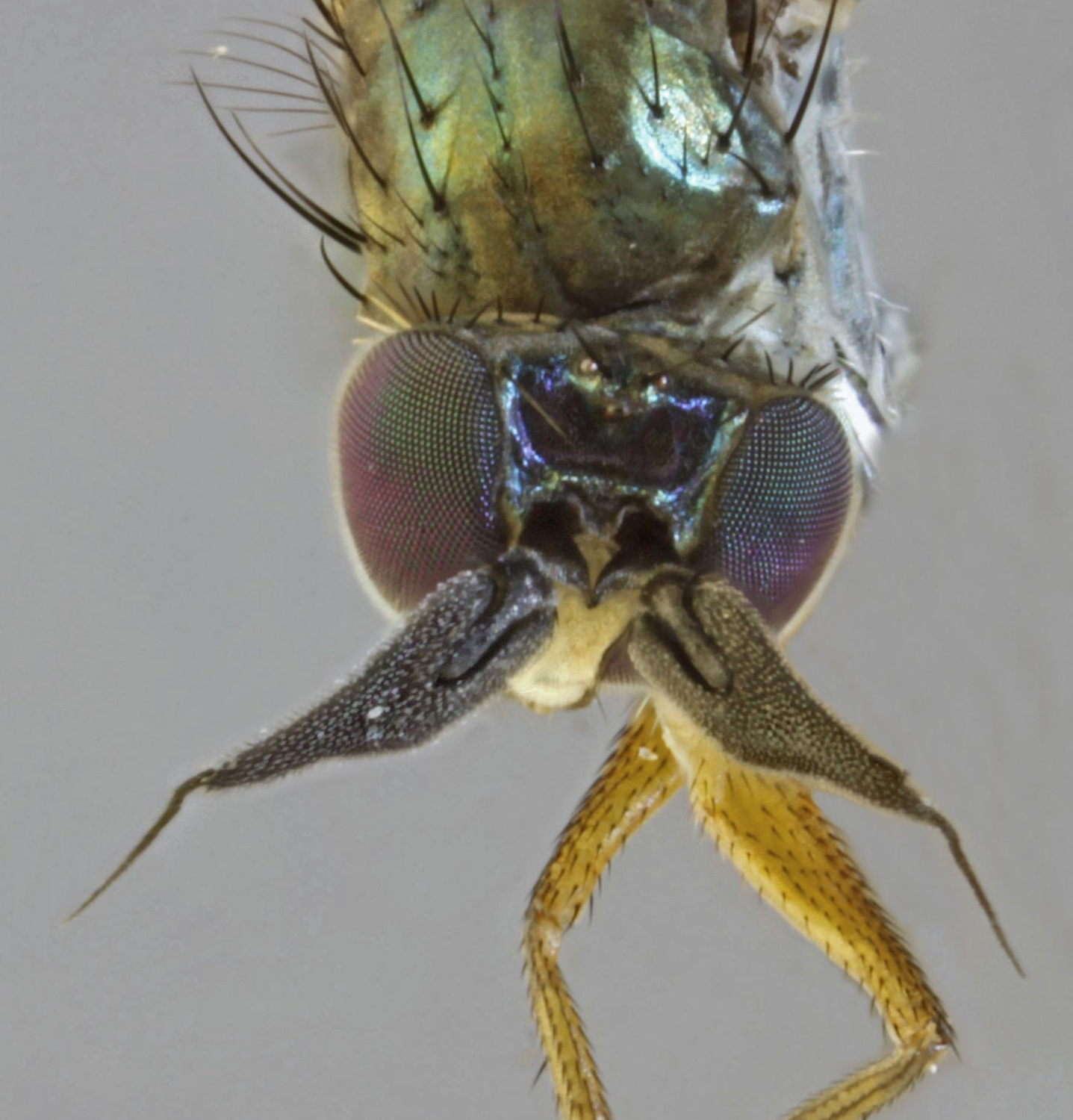
Front view of the head of S. pallipes. The small thumb-shaped projection of the second segment of the antennae, after which the genus is named, is visible.

The name Syntormon is derived from the Ancient Greek word συντορμόω (syntormóō, "I connect by inserted pins"); it refers to the second segment of the antennae, the pedicel, which has a small thumb-shaped projection going into the inner side of the postpedicel (the first unit of the third segment, the flagellum), appearing as if it were a pin inserted into a socket.

== Species ==
The following species are included in the genus: (Note: Masculine name endings are used in this list following Grichanov (2013, 2026), who argued that Syntormon has masculine gender because Loew originally treated it as masculine. Alternatively, the genus has been argued to have neuter gender, based on the name ending in "-on". This would mean the species names would instead have neuter endings, e.g. "tarsatum" instead of "tarsatus". This does not apply to species names using nouns in apposition, such as aotearoa and macula, which retain the original spelling regardless of gender. A case on the subject of the gender of Syntormon has been submitted to the International Commission on Zoological Nomenclature.)

Subgenus Syntormon Loew, 1857:

- Syntormon abbreviatus Becker, 1918
- Syntormon affinis (Wheeler, 1899)
- Syntormon ama Hollis, 1964
- Syntormon aotearoa Bickel, 1999
- Syntormon babu Hollis, 1964
- Syntormon beijingensis Yang, 1998
- Syntormon bicolorellus (Zetterstedt, 1843)
- Syntormon bisinuatus Van Duzee, 1925
- Syntormon boninensis Bickel, 1994
- Syntormon brevicornis Frey, 1936
- Syntormon bulgariensis Negrobov & Kechev, 2012
- Syntormon caffer Curran, 1925
- Syntormon californicus Harmston, 1951
- Syntormon cilitarsis Becker, 1922
- Syntormon cilitibia Stackelberg, 1947
- Syntormon cinereiventris (Loew, 1861)
- Syntormon clavatus Van Duzee, 1925
- Syntormon codinai Parent, 1924
- Syntormon curvisetus Negrobov, Kumazawa & Tago in Negrobov, Kumazawa, Tago & Selivanova, 2015
- Syntormon cyanescens (Loew, 1858)
- Syntormon denticulatus (Zetterstedt, 1843)
- Syntormon detritus Becker, 1922
- Syntormon dissimilipes Van Duzee, 1925
- Syntormon dorsalis Vanschuytbroeck, 1951
- Syntormon drakei Grichanov, 2023
- Syntormon dukha Hollis, 1964
- Syntormon edwardsi Van Duzee, 1930
- Syntormon elongatus Becker, 1922
- Syntormon emeiensis Yang & Saigusa, 1999
- Syntormon eutarsiformis Negrobov, 1975
- Syntormon femoratus Van Duzee, 1925
- Syntormon filiger Verrall, 1912
- Syntormon flavicoxus Negrobov, Kumazawa & Tago in Negrobov, Kumazawa, Tago & Selivanova, 2015
- Syntormon flexibilis Becker, 1922
- Syntormon francoisi Meuffels & Grootaert, 1999
- Syntormon freymuthae Loew, 1873
- Syntormon frivolus Becker, 1922
- Syntormon fuscipes (von Roser, 1840)
- Syntormon giordanii Negrobov, 1974
- Syntormon grootaerti Maslova, Negrobov & Selivanova, 2017
- Syntormon henanensis Yang & Saigusa, 2000
- Syntormon iranicus Negrobov, 1974
- Syntormon janelithae Bickel, 1999
- Syntormon kennedyi Harmston & Knowlton, 1942
- Syntormon latitarsis Negrobov & Shamshev, 1984
- Syntormon longipes Parent, 1938
- Syntormon longistylus Grichanov, 2001
- Syntormon lucaris Bickel, 1999
- Syntormon luchunensis Yang & Saigusa, 2001
- Syntormon luishuiensis Yang & Saigusa, 2001
- Syntormon luteicornis Parent, 1927
- Syntormon macula Parent, 1927
  - Syntormon macula macula Parent, 1927
  - Syntormon macula mediterraneus Grichanov, 2013
- Syntormon medogensis Wang, Yang & Masunaga, 2006
- Syntormon metathesis (Loew, 1850)
- Syntormon miki Strobl, 1899
- Syntormon monile (Haliday, 1851)
- Syntormon monochaetus Negrobov, 1975
- Syntormon mutillatus Becker, 1918
- Syntormon nubilus Van Duzee, 1933
- Syntormon obscurior Parent, 1938
- Syntormon opimus Vanschuytbroeck, 1951
- Syntormon oregonensis Harmston & Knowlton, 1942
- Syntormon ornatipes Van Duzee, 1925
- Syntormon pallipes (Fabricius, 1794)
- Syntormon palmaris (Loew, 1864)
- Syntormon papei Grichanov, 2001
  - Syntormon papei madagascarensis Grichanov, 2001
  - Syntormon papei papei Grichanov, 2001
- Syntormon parvus Vanschuytbroeck, 1951
- Syntormon pennatus Ringdahl, 1920
- Syntormon peregrinus Parent, 1954
- Syntormon pilitibia Grichanov, 2013
- Syntormon pseudopalmarae Negrobov & Shamshev, 1985
- Syntormon pseudospicatus Strobl, 1899 (Note: This species is sometimes treated as a synonym of Syntormon pallipes.)
- Syntormon pumilus (Meigen, 1824)
- Syntormon punctatus (Zetterstedt, 1843)
- Syntormon qianus Wei & Yang, 2007
- Syntormon quadratus Aldrich, 1901
- Syntormon rhodani Vaillant, 1983
- Syntormon rotundicornis Van Duzee, 1931
- Syntormon samarkandi Negrobov, 1975
- Syntormon seguyi (Vaillant, 1952)
- Syntormon setosus Parent, 1938
- Syntormon simplicitarsis Van Duzee, 1925
- Syntormon singaporensis Grootaert, Yang & Wang, 2006
- Syntormon singularis Bickel, 1999
- Syntormon sinicus Qian, Tang, Wang & Yang, 2024
- Syntormon siplivinskii Negrobov, 1975
- Syntormon smirnovi Stackelberg, 1952
- Syntormon straeleni Vanschuytbroeck, 1951
- Syntormon strataegus (Wheeler, 1899)
- Syntormon subinermis (Loew, 1869)
  - Syntormon subinermis asiaticus Negrobov, 1975
  - Syntormon subinermis subinermis (Loew, 1869)
- Syntormon submonilis Negrobov, 1975
- Syntormon sulcipes (Meigen, 1824)
- Syntormon tabarkae Becker, 1918
- Syntormon tamatave Grichanov, 2001
- Syntormon tarsatus (Fallén, 1823)
- Syntormon tasmanensis Bickel, 1999
- Syntormon triangulipes Becker, 1902
- Syntormon tricoloripes Curran, 1923
- Syntormon trisetus Yang, 1998
- Syntormon uintaensis Harmston & Knowlton, 1940
- Syntormon utahensis Harmston & Knowlton, 1942
- Syntormon valae Negrobov & Zhilina, 1986
- Syntormon vanduzeei Curran, 1931
- Syntormon variegatus Harmston, 1952
- Syntormon violovitshi Negrobov, 1975
- Syntormon wittei Vanschuytbroeck, 1951
- Syntormon xinjiangensis Yang, 1999
- Syntormon xiphandroides Parent, 1932
- Syntormon xishuiensis Wang, Yang & Grootaert, 2008
- Syntormon xizangensis Yang, 1999
- Syntormon zelleri (Loew, 1850)
- Syntormon zhengi Yang, 1998

Subgenus Drymonoeca Becker, 1907:

- Syntormon aulicus (Meigen, 1824)

Unrecognised species:

- Syntormon decoratus (Haliday, 1832)

Synonyms:

- Syntormon dobrogicus Pârvu, 1985: synonym of Syntormon metathesis (Loew, 1850)
- Syntormon praeteritus (Parent, 1929): moved to Sympycnus
- Syntormon silvianus Pârvu, 1989: synonym of Syntormon submonilis Negrobov, 1975

Syntormon guizhouensis Wang & Yang, 2006 is an unavailable name, as it does not satisfy ICZN Articles 16.1 and 16.4: the original publication does not explicitly indicate the name to be intentionally new, and the fixation of name-bearing types for the species is not explicit.
