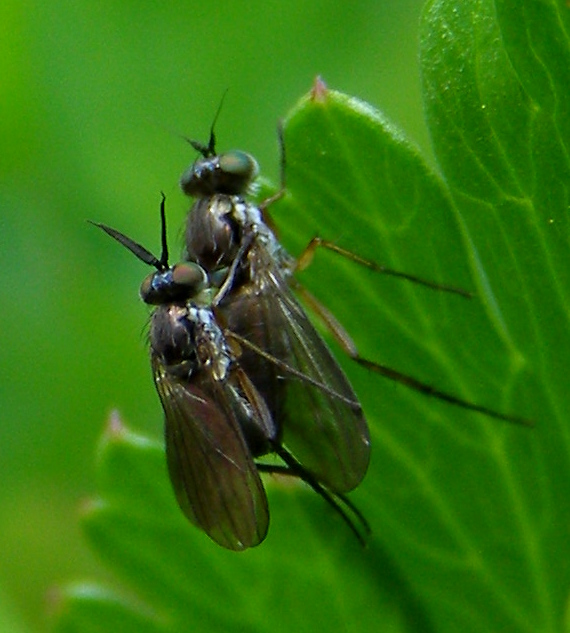
- Rhaphium sp.

Scientific classification
- Kingdom: Animalia
- Phylum: Arthropoda
- Class: Insecta
- Order: Diptera
- Family: Dolichopodidae
- Subfamily: Rhaphiinae
- Genus: Rhaphium; Meigen, 1803

Type species
- Rhaphium macrocerum Meigen, 1824

Synonyms
- Hydrochus Fallen, 1823 (nec Leach, 1817); Raphium Latreille, 1829 (unjustified emendation); Perithinus Haliday, 1832; Anglearia Carlier, 1835; Xiphandrium Loew, 1857

= Rhaphium =

Genus of flies

Rhaphium is a genus of flies in the family Dolichopodidae. It is the largest genus within the subfamily Rhaphiinae, with over 200 species currently known.

== Etymology ==
The generic name Rhaphium is derived from the Ancient Greek word ῥάφιον (rháphion, "a small needle"), referring to the shape of the antennae.

== Species ==
- Rhaphium aequale Van Duzee, 1927
- Rhaphium albibarbum (Van Duzee, 1924)
- Rhaphium albifrons Zetterstedt, 1843
- Rhaphium albomaculatum (Becker, 1891)
- Rhaphium aldrichi (Van Duzee, 1922)
- Rhaphium antennatum (Carlier, 1835)
- Rhaphium apicinigrum Yang & Saigusa, 1999
- Rhaphium apophysatum Tang, Wang & Yang, 2016
- Rhaphium appendiculatum Zetterstedt, 1849
- Rhaphium arboreum Curran, 1924
- Rhaphium armatum Curran, 1924
- Rhaphium atkinsoni Curran, 1926
- Rhaphium auctum Loew, 1857
- Rhaphium baihuashanum Yang, 1998
- Rhaphium banksi Van Duzee, 1926
- Rhaphium barbipes (Van Duzee, 1923)
- Rhaphium basale Loew, 1850
- Rhaphium beringiense Negrobov & Vockeroth, 1979
- Rhaphium bidilatatum (Parent, 1954)
- Rhaphium bilobum Tang, Wang & Yang, 2016
- Rhaphium bisectum Tang, Wang & Yang, 2016
- Rhaphium boreale (Van Duzee, 1923)
- Rhaphium borisovi Negrobov, Barkalov & Selivanova, 2012
- Rhaphium brachyceras Meuffels & Grootaert, 1999
- Rhaphium brevicorne Curtis, 1835
- Rhaphium brevilamellatum Van Duzee in Curran, 1926
- Rhaphium brooksi Negrobov, Barkalov & Selivanova, 2011
- Rhaphium browni Curran, 1931
- Rhaphium bukzeevae Grichanov, 1995
- Rhaphium bulyginskayae Grichanov, 1995
- Rhaphium calcaratum Van Duzee, 1928
- Rhaphium caliginosum Meigen, 1824
- Rhaphium campestre Curran, 1924
- Rhaphium canadense Curran, 1924
- Rhaphium canniccii Grootaert, Taylor & Guénard, 2019
- Rhaphium caucasicum Negrobov, Grichanov & Selivanova, 2013
- Rhaphium caudatum Van Duzee in Curran, 1926
- Rhaphium ciliatum Curran, 1929
- Rhaphium coloradense Curran, 1926
- Rhaphium colute Harmston & James in Harmston & Knowlton, 1942
- Rhaphium commune (Meigen, 1824)
- Rhaphium confine Zetterstedt, 1843
- Rhaphium crassipes (Meigen, 1824)
- Rhaphium crinitum Negrobov & Onishchenko, 1991
- Rhaphium currani (Parent, 1939)
- Rhaphium curvitarsus Negrobov, Maslova & Selivanova, 2020
- Rhaphium daqinggouense Tang, Wang & Yang, 2016
- Rhaphium dichromum Negrobov, 1976
- Rhaphium discigerum Stenhammar, 1850
- Rhaphium discolor Zetterstedt, 1838
- Rhaphium dispar Coquillett, 1898
- Rhaphium doroninae Grichanov, 1995
- Rhaphium doroteum Negrobov, 1979
- Rhaphium dorsiseta Tang, Wang & Yang, 2016
- Rhaphium dubium (Van Duzee, 1922)
- Rhaphium eburnea (Parent, 1926)
- Rhaphium effilatum (Wheeler, 1899)
- Rhaphium elegantulum (Meigen, 1824)
- Rhaphium elongatum Van Duzee, 1933
- Rhaphium ensicorne Meigen, 1824
- Rhaphium essoense Negrobov, 1979
- Rhaphium exile Curran, 1926
- Rhaphium fasciatum Meigen, 1824
- Rhaphium fascipes (Meigen, 1824)
- Rhaphium femineum (Van Duzee, 1922)
- Rhaphium femoratum (Van Duzee, 1922)
- Rhaphium firsovi Stackelberg & Negrobov in Negrobov, 1976
- Rhaphium fissum Loew, 1850
- Rhaphium flavicoxa (Van Duzee, 1922)
- Rhaphium flavilabre Negrobov, 1979
- Rhaphium foliatum Curran, 1926
- Rhaphium furcatum Yang & Saigusa, 2000
- Rhaphium furciferum Curran, 1931
- Rhaphium gangchanum Qilemoge, Wang & Yang, 2019
- Rhaphium gansuanum Yang, 1998
- Rhaphium gibsoni Curran, 1926
- Rhaphium glaciale (Ringdahl, 1920)
- Rhaphium gracile Curran, 1924
- Rhaphium grandicercum Negrobov, 1979
- Rhaphium grande (Curran, 1923)
- Rhaphium gravipes Haliday in Walker, Stainton & Wilkinson, 1851
- Rhaphium gruniniani Negrobov, 1979
- Rhaphium gussakovskii Stackelberg & Negrobov in Negrobov, 1976
- Rhaphium heilongjiangense Wang, Yang & Masunaga, 2005
- Rhaphium hirtimanum Van Duzee, 1933
- Rhaphium holmgreni (Mik, 1878)
- Rhaphium hongkongense Grootaert, Taylor & Guénard, 2019
- Rhaphium hungaricum (Becker, 1918)
- Rhaphium huzhuense Qilemoge, Lin, Qi, Li & Yang, 2020
- Rhaphium impetuum Curran, 1926
- Rhaphium insolitum Curran, 1926
- Rhaphium intermedium (Becker, 1918)
- Rhaphium jamalense Negrobov, 1986
- Rhaphium johnrichardi Negrobov & Grichanov, 2010
- Rhaphium johnsoni (Van Duzee, 1923)
- Rhaphium lanceolatum Loew, 1850
- Rhaphium latifacies Van Duzee, 1930
- Rhaphium latimanum Kahanpaa, 2007
- Rhaphium lehri Negrobov, 1977
- Rhaphium longibara Van Duzee, 1930
- Rhaphium longicorne (Fallen, 1823)
- Rhaphium longipalpe Curran, 1926
- Rhaphium longipes (Loew, 1864)
- Rhaphium lugubre Loew, 1861
- Rhaphium lumbricum Wei, 2006
- Rhaphium macalpini Negrobov, 1986
- Rhaphium mcveighi Grichanov, 1995
- Rhaphium mediocre (Becker, 1922)
- Rhaphium melampus (Loew, 1861)
- Rhaphium mesasiaticum Negrobov, Selivanova & Maslova, 2013
- Rhaphium micans (Meigen, 1824)
- Rhaphium minhense Qilemoge, Lin, Qi, Li & Yang, 2020
- Rhaphium monotrichum Loew, 1850
- Rhaphium montanum (Van Duzee, 1920)
- Rhaphium nasutum (Fallen, 1823)
- Rhaphium neimengense Tang, Wang & Yang, 2016
- Rhaphium neolatifacies Yang & Wang, 2006
- Rhaphium nigribarbatum (Becker, 1900)
- Rhaphium nigricoxa (Loew, 1861)
- Rhaphium nigrociliatum Curran, 1926
- Rhaphium nigrovittatum Curran, 1926
- Rhaphium nigrum (Van Duzee, 1923)
- Rhaphium nubilum Van Duzee, 1930
- Rhaphium nudiusculum Negrobov, 1976
- Rhaphium nuortevai Negrobov, 1977
- Rhaphium obscuripes Zetterstedt, 1849
- Rhaphium obtusum Van Duzee, 1928
- Rhaphium occipitale Curran, 1927
- Rhaphium orientale Curran, 1926
- Rhaphium ovsyannikovae Grichanov, 1995
- Rhaphium palliaristatum Yang & Saigusa, 2001
- Rhaphium palpale Curran, 1926
- Rhaphium parentianum Negrobov, 1979
- Rhaphium patellitarse (Becker, 1900)
- Rhaphium patulum (Raddatz, 1873)
- Rhaphium paulseni Philippi, 1865
- Rhaphium pectinatum (Loew, 1859)
- Rhaphium pectinigerum (Parent, 1938)
- Rhaphium penicillatum Loew, 1850
- Rhaphium petchi Curran, 1924
- Rhaphium picketti Grichanov, 1995
- Rhaphium pitkini Grichanov, 1995
- Rhaphium pollex (Van Duzee, 1922)
- Rhaphium psilopodum (Becker, 1918)
- Rhaphium punctitarse Curran, 1924
- Rhaphium qinghaiense Yang, 1998
- Rhaphium quadrispinosum (Strobl, 1898)
- Rhaphium reaveyi Grichanov, 1995
- Rhaphium relatum (Becker, 1922)
- Rhaphium rhaphioides Zetterstedt, 1838
- Rhaphium richterae Negrobov, 1977
- Rhaphium riparium (Meigen, 1824)
- Rhaphium rivale (Loew, 1869)
- Rhaphium robustum Curran, 1926
- Rhaphium rossi Harmston & Knowlton, 1940
- Rhaphium rotundiceps (Loew, 1861)
- Rhaphium sachalinense Negrobov, 1979
- Rhaphium septentrionale Curran, 1931
- Rhaphium sexsetosum (Vanschuytbroeck, 1951)
- Rhaphium shaliuhense Qilemoge, Wang & Yang, 2019
- Rhaphium shamshevi Grichanov, 1995
- Rhaphium shannoni Curran, 1926
- Rhaphium sibiricum Negrobov, Barkalov & Selivanova, 2011
- Rhaphium sichotense Negrobov, 1979
- Rhaphium sichuanense Yang & Saigusa, 1999
- Rhaphium signifer (Osten Sacken, 1878)
- Rhaphium simplicipes Curran, 1926
- Rhaphium sinense Negrobov, 1979
- Rhaphium speciosum (S. Abreu, 1929)
- Rhaphium spinitarse Curran, 1924
- Rhaphium spinulatum Grootaert, Taylor & Guénard, 2019
- Rhaphium srilankense Naglis & Grootaert, 2011
- Rhaphium stackelbergi Negrobov, 1976
- Rhaphium steyskali Robinson, 1967
- Rhaphium suave (Loew, 1859)
- Rhaphium subarmatum Curran, 1924
- Rhaphium subfurcatum Van Duzee, 1932
- Rhaphium subtridactylum Negrobov, Barkalov & Selivanova, 2011
- Rhaphium temerarium (Becker, 1922)
- Rhaphium terminale (Van Duzee, 1924)
- Rhaphium tianshanicum Negrobov, Grichanov & Selivanova, 2013
- Rhaphium tianshuiense Qilemoge, Wang & Yang, 2019
- Rhaphium tibiale (von Roser, 1840)
- Rhaphium triangulatum (Van Duzee, 1922)
- Rhaphium tricaudatum (Van Duzee, 1923)
- Rhaphium tridactylum (Frey, 1915)
- Rhaphium tripartitum (Frey, 1913)
- Rhaphium tuberculatum (Negrobov, 1973)
- Rhaphium turanicola (Stackelberg, 1927)
- Rhaphium umbripenne (Frey, 1915)
- Rhaphium vanduzeei Curran, 1926
- Rhaphium venustum Negrobov, 1977
- Rhaphium vockerothi Robinson, 1964
- Rhaphium wheeleri Van Duzee, 1932
- Rhaphium wuduanum Wang, Yang & Masunaga, 2005
- Rhaphium xinjiangense Yang, 1998
- Rhaphium xipheres (Wheeler, 1899)
- Rhaphium xiphias Meigen, 1824
- Rhaphium zairense Negrobov, Grichanov & Bakary, 1982
- Rhaphium zakonnikovae Grichanov, 1995
- Rhaphium zhongdianum Yang & Saigusa, 2001

Unrecognised species:

- Rhaphium cupreum Macquart, 1827
- Rhaphium cylindricum Zetterstedt, 1838
- Rhaphium dilatatum Wiedemann, 1830
- Rhaphium fulvipes (Macquart, 1827)
- Rhaphium macrocerum Meigen, 1824
- Rhaphium maculipes (Meigen, 1824)
- Rhaphium magnicorne (Zetterstedt, 1843)
- Rhaphium obscuratum (Meigen, 1824)
- Rhaphium rufipes Meigen, 1824
- Rhaphium thoracicum (Meigen, 1824)

== Gallery ==
Rhaphium sp. in copula
