= E. C. M. d'Assis-Fonseca =

Evelyn Cecil Muschamp d'Assis Fonseca (1899–1993) was a British dipterist of Brazilian birth. His birth-place is given as Peri-peri. His mother, along with her other children, had come to Britain by 1911, and set up house in Bristol. Around 1920 he became a student of engineering at the University of Bristol, and then developed a career, also in Bristol, as an aeronautical engineer and designer, continuing to reside in Bristol up to his death in 1993. How he developed an interest in entomology is at present not known.

In 1932 he married Muriel Cressy Tucker (1906–2002). They had two children.

He was responsible for formally naming a number of fly species, including:

- Dolichopus subpennatus
- Fannia collini
- Fannia pseudonorvegica
- Fannia subatripes
- Alliopsis similaris
- Heterostylodes caledonicus

He authored two volumes in the Royal Entomological Society of London's Handbooks for the Identification of British Insects series:

- Handbooks for the Ident. of British Insects. Cyclorrhapha Calyptrata section (b) Muscidae (1968)
- Handbooks for the Ident. of British Insects. Brachycera : Dolichopodidae (1978)

His extensive Diptera collection is now in the Hope Entomological Collections of the Oxford University Museum of Natural History.

Fonseca's seed fly, the rarest endemic insect in the UK, is named after Fonseca, who described the type specimen.
