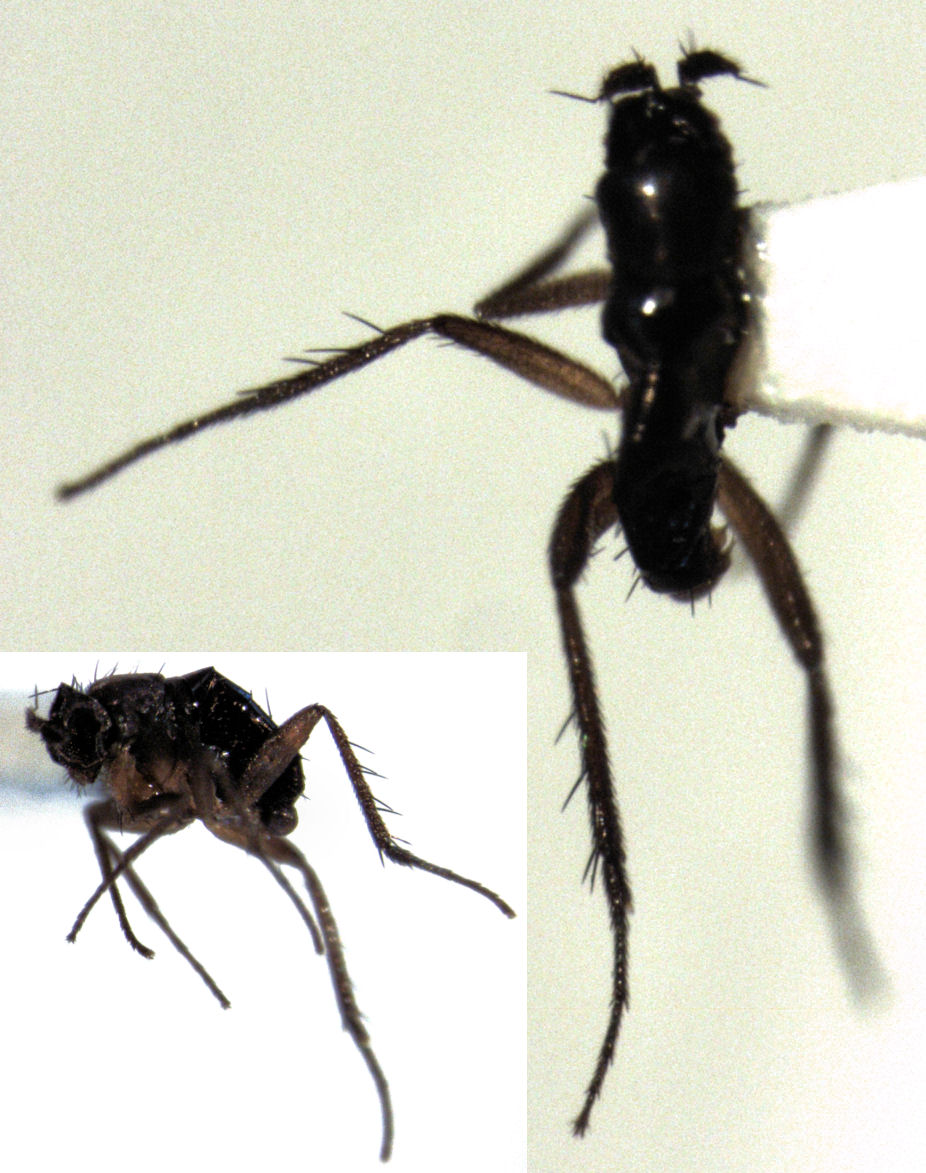
- Apterachalcus borboroides male

Scientific classification
- Domain: Eukaryota
- Kingdom: Animalia
- Phylum: Arthropoda
- Class: Insecta
- Order: Diptera
- Family: Dolichopodidae
- Subfamily: Achalcinae; Grootaert & Meuffels, 1997

Genera
- see text

= Achalcinae =

Subfamily of flies

Achalcinae is a subfamily of flies in the family Dolichopodidae. It is an ancestral group close to Medeterinae and Sciapodinae.

== Genera ==
- Achalcus Loew, 1857
- Apterachalcus Bickel, 1992
- Australachalcus Pollet, 2005
- Scepastopyga Grootaert & Meuffels, 1997
- Xanthina Aldrich, 1902
