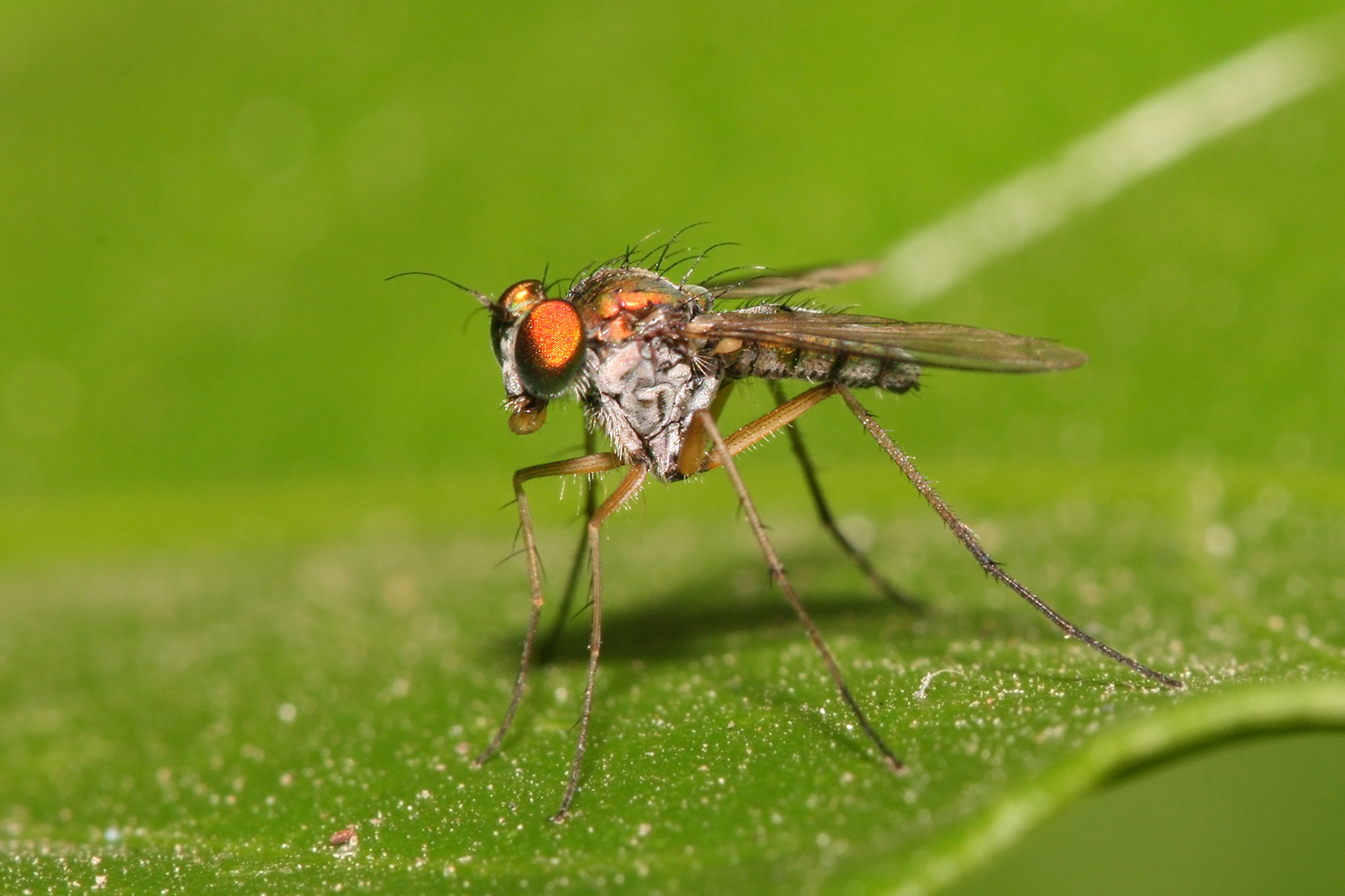
- Chrysosoma sp.

Scientific classification
- Kingdom: Animalia
- Phylum: Arthropoda
- Class: Insecta
- Order: Diptera
- Infraorder: Asilomorpha
- Superfamily: Empidoidea
- Family: Dolichopodidae; Latreille, 1809

Subfamilies
- sensu stricto: Achalcinae; Antyxinae; Babindellinae; Diaphorinae; Dolichopodinae; Enliniinae; †Eodolichopoditinae; Hydrophorinae; Kowmunginae; Medeterinae; Neurigoninae; Peloropeodinae; Plagioneurinae; Rhaphiinae; Sciapodinae; Stolidosomatinae; Sympycninae; Tenuopodinae; Xanthochlorinae; sensu lato: Microphorinae; Parathalassiinae

Diversity
- About 250 genera, more than 8,000 species

Synonyms
- Dolichopidae

= Dolichopodidae =

Dolichopodidae Temporal range: Cretaceous–Recent

Family of flies

Dolichopodidae, the long-legged flies, are a large, cosmopolitan family of true flies with more than 8,000 described species in about 250 genera. The genus Dolichopus is the most speciose, with some 600 species.

Dolichopodidae generally are small flies with large, prominent eyes and a metallic cast to their appearance, though there is considerable variation among the species. Most have long legs, though some do not. In many species, the males have unusually large genitalia which are taxonomically useful in identifying species. Most adults are predatory on other small animals, though some may scavenge or act as kleptoparasites of spiders or other predators.

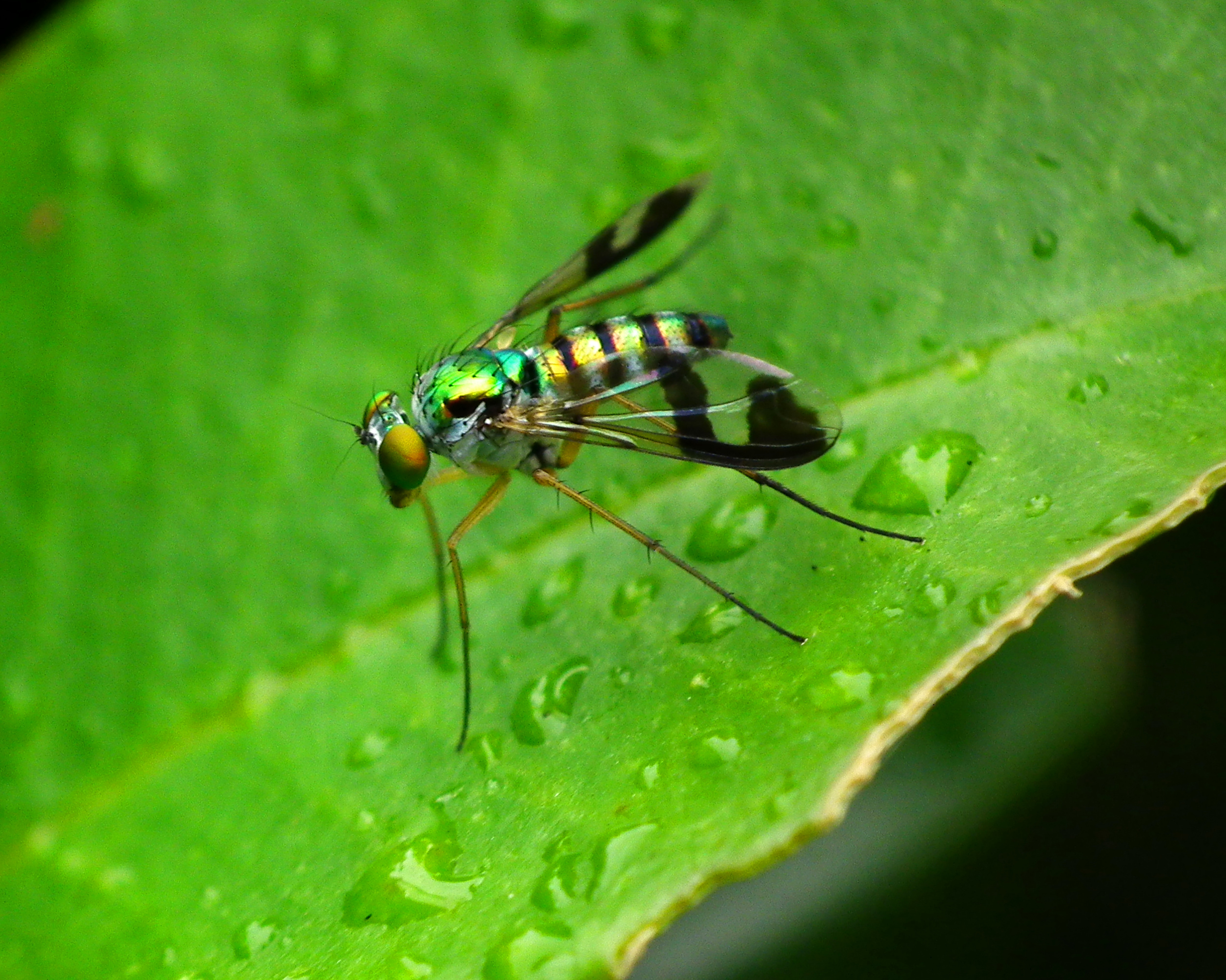
Austrosciapus connexus—a typical example of green Dolichopodidae

== Description ==
Dolichopodidae are a family of flies ranging in size from minute to medium-sized (1 mm to 9 mm). They have characteristically long and slender legs, though their leg length is not as striking as in families such as the Tipulidae. Their posture often is stilt-like standing high on their legs, with the body almost erect. In colour most species have a green-to-blue metallic lustre, but various other species are dull yellow, brown or black.

The frons in both sexes is broad. The eyes are separated on the frons of males, except in some species of Diaphorus and Chrysotus in which eyes touch above the antennal insertion. On the heads of most species the ocellar bristles and outer vertical bristles are well developed. The face of some species is entire; in others it is divided into two sections: the epistoma and the clypeus. The largest antennal segment is the third; in most species it bears a long arista, which is apical in some species, dorsal in others. In most species the mouthparts are short and have a wide aperture as an adaptation for sucking small prey.

The legs are gracile and the tibiae usually bear long bristles. In some genera the legs are raptorial. In some species the tibiae of the males have modifications.

Dolichopodidae wing veins. This is one major type, with M_{1} bent and M_{2} present, though often incomplete. In another type, M_{2} is absent and M_{1} more or less straight

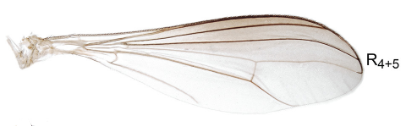
Photograph of a Dolichopodidae wing, showing the R_{4+5} vein

The wings of most species are clear or tinged, but some species have wings that are patterned in strong colours or with distinct spots. There are three radial veins (R_{1}, R_{2+3}, R_{4+5}). The medial vein M_{1+2} is simple or rarely furcate, as in the genus Sciapus. The anterior cross-vein is in the basal part of the wing. The posterior basal wing cell and the discoidal wing cell are always fused. The anal cell of the wing is always small. There are two veins branching from cross-vein DM-Cu in the direction of the wing margin; the upper one in some species curves strongly or forks into M_{1} and M_{2}. R_{4+5} are simple, and costa ends near or at M_{1}/M_{1+2,} or continues along the wing margin. The point of origin of R_{s} is at or very close to h.

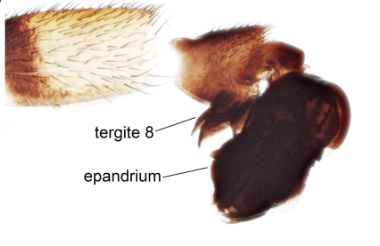
Photograph of genetalia of a male Empis vitripennis. Note the asymmetrical tergite 8 on the left side of the epiandrium

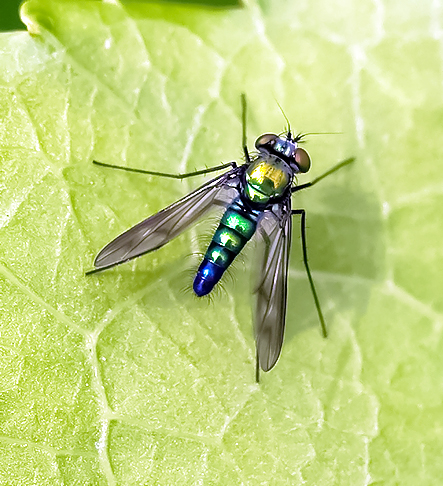
Condylostylus patibulatus

The abdomen is elongate-conical or flat. The genitalia of the male often are free and borne on a petiole, with tergite 8 being asymmetrical, lying on the left side of the epandrium. They are also rotated dextrally between 90° and 180°, including segment 8 and sometimes segment 7, which makes them distinguishable from the family Hybotidae. Males of most species have well-developed gonopods of two or three lobes on the distal margin of the epandrium. The gonopods may fuse with the epandrium in genera such as Hydrophorus, Thrypticus and Argyra, or there may be a suture, as in the genera Porphyrops, Xiphandrium and Rhaphium. In some genera, such as Hypophyllus and Tachytrechus, the surstyli are well-developed as secondary outgrowths of the epandrium. In genera such as Tachytrechus, there are two pairs of surstyli—one proximal and one distal. The hypandrium in most species is a small sclerite, which may be asymmetrical as in the genera Porphyrops and Tachytrechus. Males of many species have highly developed cerci. Development of the phallus varies considerably between genera.

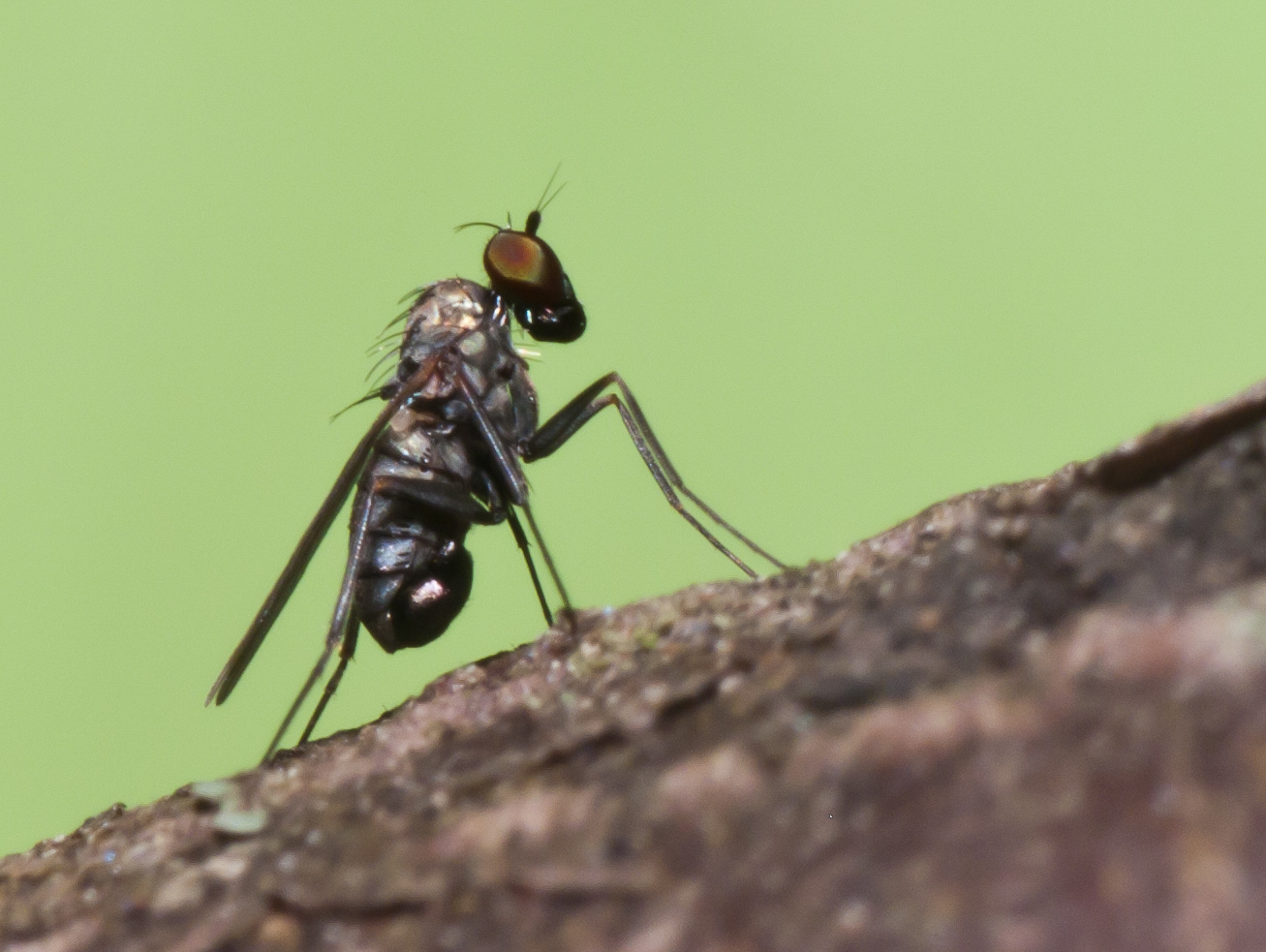
Dolichopodidae, cf. genus Medetera, typical of brown species inhabiting bark of damaged trees. Characteristic head-up, stilt-legged posture

== Biology ==
Adults of the Dolichopodidae live largely in grassy places and shrubbery. The flies occur in a wide range of habitats, near water or in meadows, woodland edges and in gardens. Some groups are confined to wet places including sands on the banks of water bodies; examples include genera such as Porphyrops, Tachytrechus, Campsicnemus, and Teuchophorus. No truly aquatic species have been described, but many are semi-aquatic and live in or near water margins. A small number of species develop on the shores of saline inland bodies of water or the intertidal zone of seashores. An example of a species that develop close to water is P. nobilitatus, they can be found congregating around lakes and ponds. Other groups are found on trunks of trees damaged by bark beetles. Adults often are seen in a characteristic predatory posture standing high on their legs on the ground or on vegetation, tree trunks or rocks, and some species walk about on the surface of still water.

The adults are predators, feeding on small invertebrates including Collembola, aphids, and the larvae of Oligochaeta. Species of the genus Dolichopus commonly prey on the larvae of mosquitoes.

The larvae occupy a wide range of habitats. Many are predators of small invertebrates and generally live in moist environments such as soil, moist sand, or rotting organic matter. Genera such as Medetera live as predators under tree bark or in the tunnels of bark beetles. Larvae of the genus Thrypticus are unusual among Dolichopodidae, in that they are phytophagous and live in the stems of reeds and other monocots near water.

== Behaviour ==
Foraging and nuptial behaviour of Poecilobothrus nobilitatus (video, 2m 58s)

Long-legged fly mating behavior.

Many studies have shown that Dolichopodidae give visual, rather than chemical or other signals during courtship. The males of many species exhibit elaborate secondary sexual characters assumed to aid in species recognition during courtship. These characters include flaglike flattening of the arista and tarsi, strongly modified setae and projections of the tarsi, the prolongation and deformation of podomeres, orientated silvery pruinosity, and maculation or modification of the wings.

== Evolution and systematics ==
Kleptoparasitic Microphor holosericeus (Microphorinae) feeding on captured prey of a spider

Dolichopodids are well represented in amber deposits throughout the world and the group has clearly been well distributed globally, at least since the Cretaceous. Together with the Empididae they are the most advanced members of the Empidoidea. They represent the bulk of Empidoidea diversity, and include more than two-thirds of the known species in their superfamily.

Taxonomic interrelationships within the Dolichopodidae, and their delimitation from the Empididae, are not yet satisfactorily resolved. It is likely that many of the subfamilies currently within the Dolichopodidae will undergo drastic revision.

An expanded concept of the family, Dolichopodidae sensu lato, includes the former family Micromorphidae as the subfamilies Microphorinae and Parathalassiinae, the latter forming a monophyletic group with the Dolichopodidae sensu stricto. Alternatively, Grichanov (2011) proposes that Dolichopodidae s.l. should be treated as an epifamily Dolichopodoidae, containing Dolichopodidae, Microphoridae and the subfamily Parathalassiinae.

Based on the most recent phylogenetic studies, the relationship between Dolichopodidae and other members of Empidoidea is as follows. The placement of Dolichopodidae is emphasized in bold formatting.

- Atelestidae
  - - Atelestinae
    - Nemedininae
- - Hybotidae
    - Bicellariinae
    - - - - - - Hybotinae
              - Oedaleinae
            - Ocydromiinae
          - Trichininae
        - Tachydromiinae
          - - Tachydromiini
            - Symballaphthalmini
          - Drapetini
  - - **Dolichopodidae**
    - - Ragadidae
        - Iteaphilinae
        - Ragadinae
      - Empididae
        - Clinocerinae
        - - Brachystomatinae
            - Brachystomatini
            - Ceratomerini
            - Trichopezini
          - Empidinae
            - - Chelipodini
              - Empidini
            - - Hemerodromiini
              - Hilarini

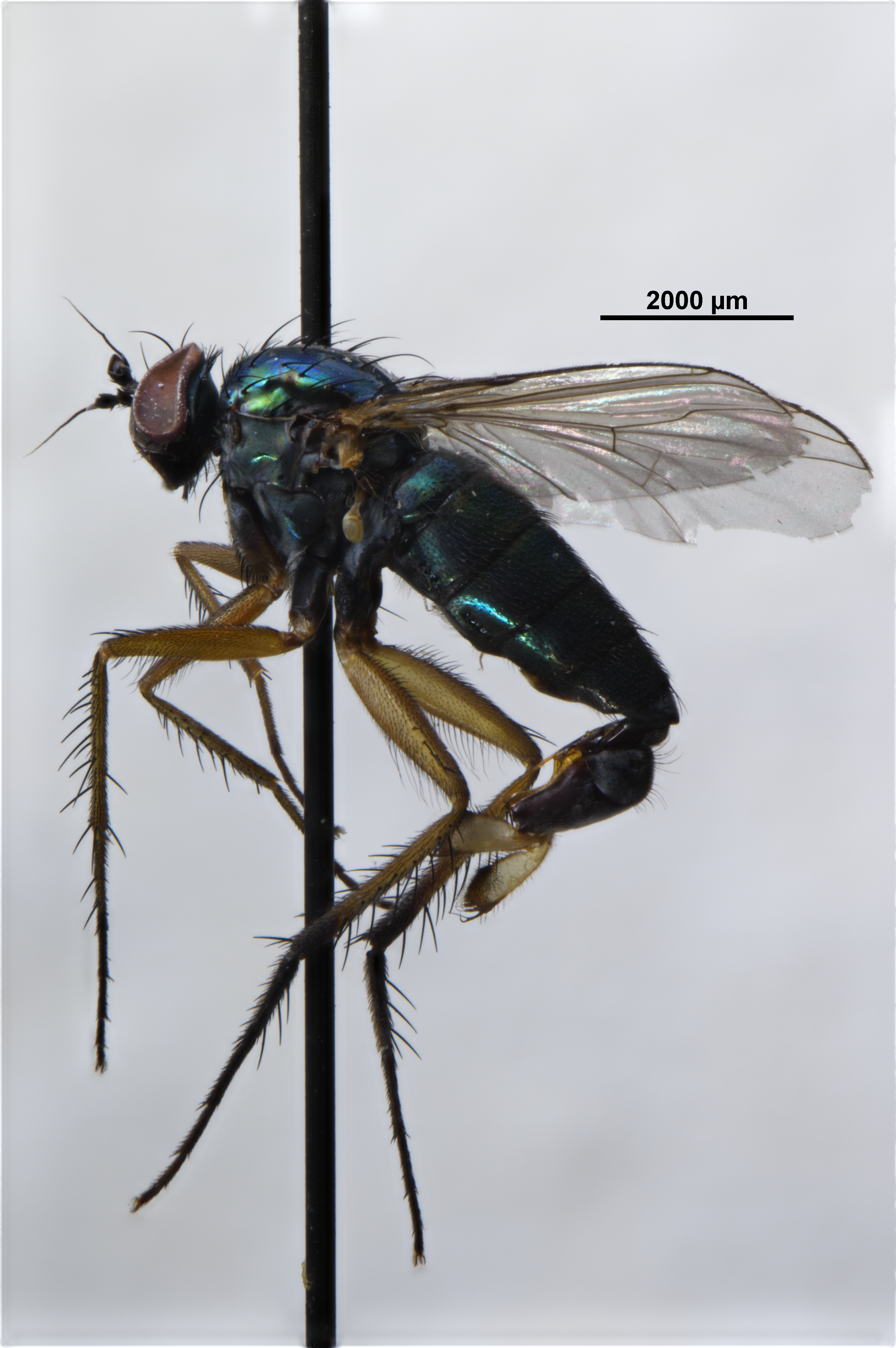
Dolichopus ungulatus

== Identification ==
- Negrobov, P. and Stackelberg, A. A. Family Dolichopodidae in Bei-Bienko, G. Ya, 1988 Keys to the insects of the European Part of the USSR Volume 5 (Diptera) Part 2 English edition. Keys to Palaearctic species but now needs revision.
- Parent, O., 1938 Diptères Dolichopodidae. Paris: Éditions Faune de France 35. virtuelle numérique

== See also ==
- List of dolichopodid genera

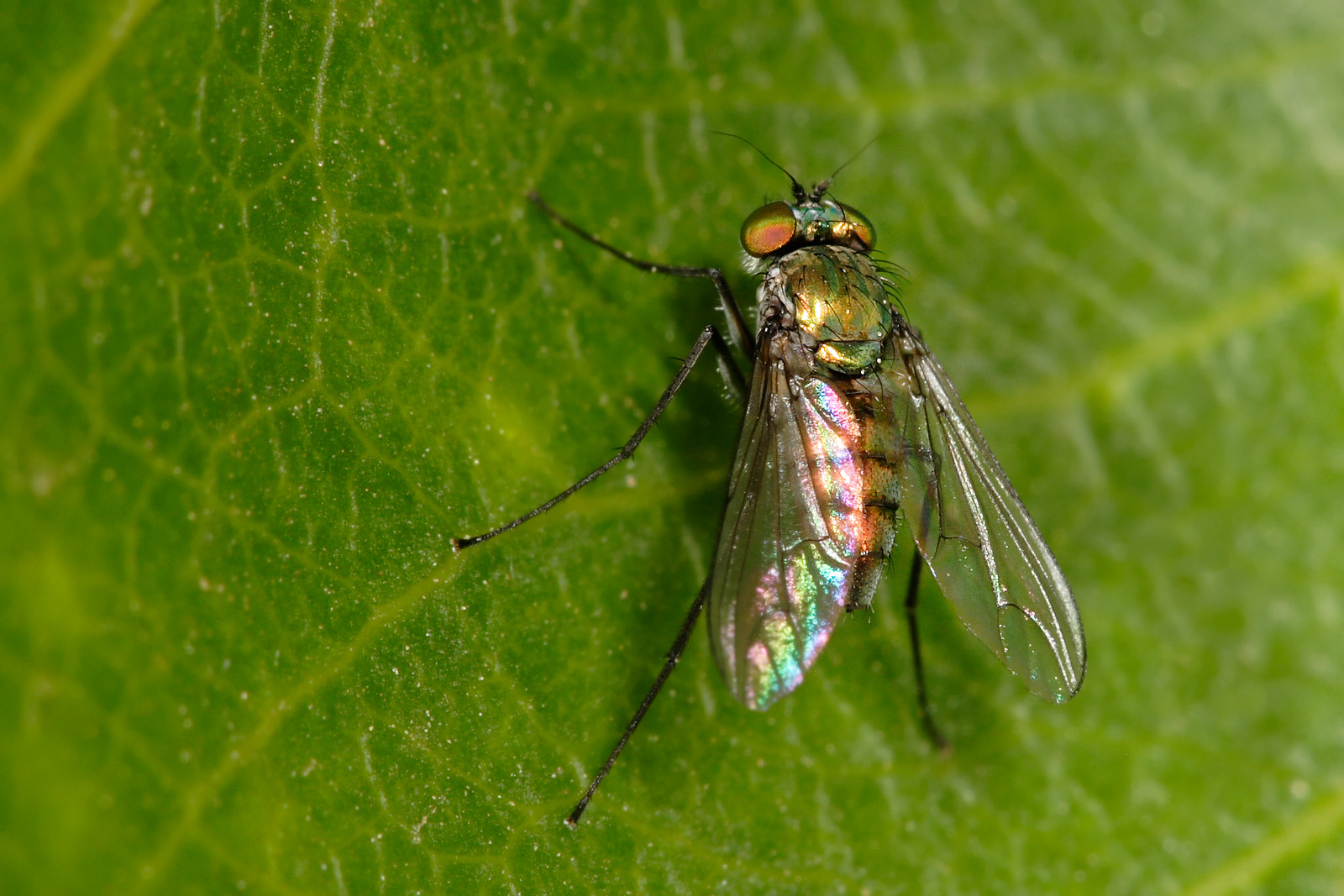
Sciapus sp.
