= List of Chrysotus species =

This is a list of 560 species in Chrysotus, a genus of long-legged flies in the family Dolichopodidae.

== Chrysotus species ==
- Chrysotus abatus Wei, Zhang & Zhou, 2014
- Chrysotus abditus Wei, Zhang & Zhou, 2014
- Chrysotus abdominus Wei, Zhang & Zhou, 2014
- Chrysotus ablutus Wei, Zhang & Zhou, 2014
- Chrysotus abnormus Wei, Zhang & Zhou, 2014
- Chrysotus acuminatus Wei, Zhang & Zhou, 2014
- Chrysotus acuticornis Becker, 1922
- Chrysotus acutus Aldrich, 1896
- Chrysotus adflictus Wei, Zhang & Zhou, 2014
- Chrysotus adsiduus Becker, 1922
- Chrysotus adunatus Wei & Zhang, 2010
- Chrysotus affinis Loew, 1861
- Chrysotus africanus (Parent, 1934)
- Chrysotus agalmus Harmston & Rapp, 1968
- Chrysotus agraulus Wei & Zhang, 2010
- Chrysotus albibarbus Loew, 1857
- Chrysotus albihirtipes Robinson, 1975
- Chrysotus albipalpus Aldrich, 1896
- Chrysotus albohirtus Van Duzee, 1924
- Chrysotus aldrichi (Van Duzee, 1915)
- Chrysotus alpicola Strobl, 1893
- Chrysotus altavaginas Liu, Wang & Yang, 2013
- Chrysotus alternus Becker, 1922
- Chrysotus amabilis Parent, 1931
- Chrysotus amicus (Parent, 1931)
- Chrysotus amplus Wei, Zhang & Zhou, 2014
- Chrysotus amurensis Negrobov, 1980
- Chrysotus anacolus Wei, Zhang & Zhou, 2014
- Chrysotus andrei Negrobov, 1986
- Chrysotus angulicornis Kowarz, 1874
- Chrysotus angulus Wei, Zhang & Zhou, 2014
- Chrysotus angustifrons (Robinson, 1975)
- Chrysotus angustus Wei, 2012
- Chrysotus annulipes Meigen, 1824
- Chrysotus anomalus Malloch, 1914
- Chrysotus anshunus Wei & Zhang, 2010
- Chrysotus anticus Wei, Zhang & Zhou, 2014
- Chrysotus antillensis Runyon, 2020
- Chrysotus aperturus Wei, 2018
- Chrysotus apicibifidus Wei, 2018
- Chrysotus apicicaudatus Wei & Zhang, 2010
- Chrysotus apicidentus Wei & Yang, 2007
- Chrysotus apicilobulus Wei, 2018
- Chrysotus apicirotundus Wei, 2018
- Chrysotus apicisetosus Wei, 2018
- Chrysotus apicispinus Wei, 2018
- Chrysotus apiculatus Wei, Zhang & Zhou, 2014
- Chrysotus aptus Wei, Zhang & Zhou, 2014
- Chrysotus araeobasus Wei, Zhang & Zhou, 2014
- Chrysotus arcticus Frey, 1915
- Chrysotus arcus Wei, Zhang & Zhou, 2014
- Chrysotus arduus Parent, 1934
- Chrysotus argentatus Van Duzee, 1924
- Chrysotus arkansensis Van Duzee, 1930
- Chrysotus artatus Wei, Zhang & Zhou, 2014
- Chrysotus artiosus Wei, Zhang & Zhou, 2014
- Chrysotus atopopterus Bickel in Bickel & Martin, 2016
- Chrysotus atratus Van Duzee, 1930
- Chrysotus auratus Loew, 1861
- Chrysotus austrotropicus Bickel, 2013
- Chrysotus badius Van Duzee, 1932
- Chrysotus baerti Bickel & Sinclair, 1997
- Chrysotus baicalensis Negrobov & Maslova, 1995
- Chrysotus bajaensis Harmston, 1968
- Chrysotus barbipes Van Duzee, 1932
- Chrysotus barretoi Becker, 1908
- Chrysotus basalus Wei, Zhang & Zhou, 2014
- Chrysotus beijingensis Wang & Yang, 2006
- Chrysotus bellax Parent, 1933
- Chrysotus bellulus Van Duzee, 1932
- Chrysotus bellus Van Duzee, 1924
- Chrysotus bermudensis Johnson, 1914
- Chrysotus bicercusi Liu & Yang, 2017
- Chrysotus bifurcatus Wang & Yang, 2008
- Chrysotus bigoti Parent, 1932
- Chrysotus binarius Wei, Zhang & Zhou, 2014
- Chrysotus biprojicienus Wei & Zhang, 2010
- Chrysotus biseta (Olejníček, 2004)
- Chrysotus blepharosceles Kowarz, 1874
- Chrysotus bracteatus Van Duzee, 1924
- Chrysotus brevicercus Wang & Yang, 2008
- Chrysotus brevicornis Van Duzee, 1933
- Chrysotus brevipulvillus Wei, 2018
- Chrysotus brevitibia Van Duzee, 1927
- Chrysotus brooksi Negrobov. Selivanova & Maslova, 2013
- Chrysotus caerulescens Negrobov, 1980
- Chrysotus caerulus Van Duzee, 1924
- Chrysotus calcaratus Van Duzee, 1930
- Chrysotus californicus Van Duzee, 1924
- Chrysotus callichromoides Runyon, 2020
- Chrysotus callichromus Robinson, 1975
- Chrysotus canadensis Van Duzee, 1924
- Chrysotus capellarii Soares & Carvalho-Filho in Soares, Carvalho-Filho & Ramos-Pastrana, 2023
- Chrysotus carolinensis Robinson, 1964
- Chrysotus caudadus Wei, 2018
- Chrysotus caudatulus Van Duzee, 1932
- Chrysotus caudatus Van Duzee, 1924
- Chrysotus cerciaffiliatus Liu, Wang & Yang, 2016
- Chrysotus chaetipalpus Parent, 1933
- Chrysotus chaetoproctus Parent, 1933
- Chrysotus chandleri Negrobov, Naglis & Maslova, 2016
- Chrysotus chetifer Parent, 1934
- Chrysotus chishuiensis Wei, 2018
- Chrysotus chlanoflavus Harmston & Knowlton, 1940
- Chrysotus chloricus Van Duzee, 1911
- Chrysotus choricus Wheeler, 1890
- Chrysotus chukotkensis Grichanov, 2012
- Chrysotus ciliatus (Becker, 1922)
- Chrysotus cilipes Meigen, 1824
- Chrysotus cilitibia Maslova & Negrobov, 2015
- Chrysotus clypeatus Robinson, 1967
- Chrysotus cockerellae Curran, 1929
- Chrysotus collini Parent, 1923
- Chrysotus coloradensis Van Duzee, 1924
- Chrysotus combinatus Zhou & Wei, 2017
- Chrysotus comminus Wei, 2018
- Chrysotus compactilus Wei, Zhang & Zhou, 2014
- Chrysotus concavus Wei, 2018
- Chrysotus concinnus Zetterstedt, 1843
- Chrysotus conicus Wei, Zhang & Zhou, 2014
- Chrysotus convergens Van Duzee, 1924
- Chrysotus coquitos Capellari, 2015
- Chrysotus corbieri Parent, 1934
- Chrysotus cordisus Wei, Zhang & Zhou, 2014
- Chrysotus corniger Negrobov & Maslova, 1995
- Chrysotus cornutus Loew, 1862
- Chrysotus costalis Loew, 1861
- Chrysotus crassitarsis Parent, 1939
- Chrysotus crassus Wei, Zhang & Zhou, 2014
- Chrysotus cressoni Van Duzee, 1924
- Chrysotus crosbyi Van Duzee, 1924
- Chrysotus cryptolobus Wei, 2018
- Chrysotus cubanus Botosaneanu & Vaillant, 1973
- Chrysotus cultellus Wei, Zhang & Zhou, 2014
- Chrysotus cupreus Macquart, 1827
- Chrysotus currani Van Duzee, 1924
- Chrysotus curvatus Wei, Zhang & Zhou, 2014
- Chrysotus curvisystylus Wei, Zhang & Zhou, 2014
- Chrysotus dakotensis Harmston, 1952
- Chrysotus daozhenus Wei, 2018
- Chrysotus decipiens Negrobov & Tsurikov, 2000
- Chrysotus defensus Negrobov & Maslova, 2000
- Chrysotus degener Frey, 1917
- Chrysotus denticornis Lamb, 1932
- Chrysotus dentus Wei, Zhang & Zhou, 2014
- Chrysotus diaoluoshanus Liu, Bian, Wang & Yang, 2016
- Chrysotus diaphorus Parent, 1939
- Chrysotus digitus Wei, Zhang & Zhou, 2014
- Chrysotus dischmaensis Naglis, 2010
- Chrysotus discolor Loew, 1861
- Chrysotus discretus Becker, 1922
- Chrysotus distalus Wei, Zhang & Zhou, 2014
- Chrysotus distinctus Van Duzee, 1924
- Chrysotus divergens Parent, 1941
- Chrysotus diversus Parent, 1933
- Chrysotus dividus Wei, Zhang & Zhou, 2014
- Chrysotus dividuus Van Duzee, 1924
- Chrysotus djaneti Vaillant, 1953
- Chrysotus dorli Negrobov, 1980
- Chrysotus dorsalis Van Duzee, 1924
- Chrysotus drakei Negrobov, Selivanova & Maslova, 2016
- Chrysotus duyunensis Wei, Zhang & Zhou, 2014
- Chrysotus duzeei Capellari & Almeida, 2024
- Chrysotus ealensis (Parent, 1936)
- Chrysotus elongatus Parent, 1934
- Chrysotus emarginatus Van Duzee, 1928
- Chrysotus emeiensis Wang & Yang, 2008
- Chrysotus eques Parent, 1931
- Chrysotus erectus Wei, 2018
- Chrysotus errans Parent, 1931
- Chrysotus exceptus Becker, 1922
- Chrysotus excisicornis Parent, 1935
- Chrysotus excisus Aldrich, 1896
- Chrysotus excretus Becker, 1922
- Chrysotus exilis Van Duzee, 1924
- Chrysotus fanjingshanus Wei & Zhang, 2010
- Chrysotus femoratus Zetterstedt, 1843
- Chrysotus flatus Wei, 2018
- Chrysotus flavicauda Van Duzee, 1928
- Chrysotus flavimaculatus Van Duzee, 1929
- Chrysotus flavipedus Wei, 2012
- Chrysotus flavipes (Aldrich, 1896)
- Chrysotus flavisetus Malloch, 1914
- Chrysotus flexilignus Wei, 2018
- Chrysotus flexus Wei, 2018
- Chrysotus foliosus Wei, Zhang & Zhou, 2014
- Chrysotus fortunatus Negrobov & Maslova, 2000
- Chrysotus frontalis Van Duzee, 1924
- Chrysotus fujianensis Wang & Yang, 2008
- Chrysotus fulvohirtus Van Duzee, 1915
- Chrysotus furcatus Robinson, 1964
- Chrysotus fuscitibialis Wei & Zhang, 2010
- Chrysotus fuscoluteus Negrobov & Zurikov, 1986
- Chrysotus fusiformus Wei, Zhang & Zhou, 2014
- Chrysotus fusiformusoides Wei, Zhang & Zhou, 2014
- Chrysotus ganpuensis Wei, Zhang & Zhou, 2014
- Chrysotus gaoligongshanus Wei, Zhang & Zhou, 2014
- Chrysotus giganteus Parent, 1931
- Chrysotus gilvipes Van Duzee, 1924
- Chrysotus givus Wei, 2018
- Chrysotus glebi Negrobov & Maslova, 1995
- Chrysotus globosus Wei, 2018
- Chrysotus gracilus Wei, Zhang & Zhou, 2014
- Chrysotus gramineus (Fallén, 1823)
- Chrysotus grandicornis Parent, 1930
- Chrysotus granus Wei, Zhang & Zhou, 2014
- Chrysotus gratiosus Becker, 1922
- Chrysotus guangxiensis Liu, Liang & Yang, 2017
- Chrysotus guanlingus Wei, 2012
- Chrysotus guizhouensis Wang & Yang, 2008
- Chrysotus guyanensis Parent, 1934
- Chrysotus hainanensis Liu, Bian, Wang & Yang, 2016
- Chrysotus halteralis Van Duzee, 1924
- Chrysotus halteratus Meuffels & Grootaert, 1996
- Chrysotus hamatus (Parent, 1931)
- Chrysotus harmstoni Meuffels & Grootaert, 1999
- Chrysotus hastatus Van Duzee, 1924
- Chrysotus herbus Wei, 2012
- Chrysotus heterophallus Wei, 2018
- Chrysotus heterosus Wei, 2018
- Chrysotus hiatus Wei, Zhang & Zhou, 2014
- Chrysotus hibernaculus Wei, Zhang & Zhou, 2014
- Chrysotus hilburni Woodley, 1996
- Chrysotus hirsutus Aldrich, 1896
- Chrysotus hirtipes Van Duzee, 1924
- Chrysotus hirtus Parent, 1931
- Chrysotus huangguoshus Wei, Zhang & Zhou, 2014
- Chrysotus hubeiensis Wang & Yang, 2008
- Chrysotus hubenovi Kechev, Naglis & Negrobov, 2022
- Chrysotus humilis Parent, 1928
- Chrysotus hypnususi Liu & Yang, 2017
- Chrysotus iconus Wei, Zhang & Zhou, 2014
- Chrysotus idahoensis Van Duzee, 1924
- Chrysotus imitator Becker, 1922
- Chrysotus impensus Wei, Zhang & Zhou, 2014
- Chrysotus incisus Parent, 1928
- Chrysotus inconspicuus Loew, 1858
- Chrysotus indifferens Curran, 1924
- Chrysotus inermis Aldrich, 1896
- Chrysotus infirmus Parent, 1933
- Chrysotus inflatus Wei, Zhang & Zhou, 2014
- Chrysotus inopus Wei, Zhang & Zhou, 2014
- Chrysotus inornatus Parent, 1933
- Chrysotus insolentus Wei, 2018
- Chrysotus insularis (Lamb, 1933)
- Chrysotus integer Robinson, 1975
- Chrysotus interfrons Runyon, 2020
- Chrysotus intrudus Harmston, 1951
- Chrysotus intumescuntus Wei, 2018
- Chrysotus ischnus Wei, Zhang & Zhou, 2014
- Chrysotus javanensis de Meijere, 1916
- Chrysotus jiaozishanus Zhou & Wei, 2017
- Chrysotus jindingensis Wang & Yang, 2008
- Chrysotus johnsoni Van Duzee, 1924
- Chrysotus junctus Van Duzee, 1924
- Chrysotus kallweiti Capellari & Amorim, 2014
- Chrysotus kansensis Harmston, 1952
- Chrysotus kerguelensis Enderlein, 1909
- Chrysotus keyensis Runyon & Capellari, 2018
- Chrysotus kholsa Hollis, 1964
- Chrysotus kirejtshuki Negrobov, Selivanova & Maslova, 2016
- Chrysotus komovi Negrobov, Barkalov & Selivanova, 2014
- Chrysotus krummus Wei, Zhang & Zhou, 2014
- Chrysotus kuankuoshuiensis Wei, 2018
- Chrysotus kumazawai Negrobov, Maslova & Fursov, 2015
- Chrysotus lacidus Wei, Zhang & Zhou, 2014
- Chrysotus laciniatus Becker, 1919
- Chrysotus lacustrus Wei, Zhang & Zhou, 2014
- Chrysotus laesus (Wiedemann, 1817)
- Chrysotus laetaminus Wei, Zhang & Zhou, 2014
- Chrysotus lamellicaudatus Robinson, 1975
- Chrysotus lamellifer Robinson, 1964
- Chrysotus laminatus Becker, 1922
- Chrysotus laminus Wei, 2018
- Chrysotus lanceolatus Wei, Zhang & Zhou, 2014
- Chrysotus lanciniatus Wei, 2018
- Chrysotus langfengguanus Wei, 2018
- Chrysotus larachensis Grichanov, Nourti & Kettani, 2020
- Chrysotus largipalpus Wei, 2012
- Chrysotus largitriangulus Wei, Zhang & Zhou, 2014
- Chrysotus larifugus Wei, 2018
- Chrysotus latealatus Vanschuytbroeck, 1951
- Chrysotus latilus Wei, Zhang & Zhou, 2014
- Chrysotus laxifacialus Wei & Zhang, 2010
- Chrysotus leigongshanus Wei & Yang, 2007
- Chrysotus leptysmus Wei, Zhang & Zhou, 2014
- Chrysotus leucosetus Harmston, 1971
- Chrysotus leucostoma (Loew, 1861)
- Chrysotus licinus Wei, Zhang & Zhou, 2014
- Chrysotus limosus Wei, Zhang & Zhou, 2014
- Chrysotus lingulatus Wei, Zhang & Zhou, 2014
- Chrysotus litoralis Robinson, 1964
- Chrysotus liui Wang & Yang, 2008
- Chrysotus ljutengensis Negrobov & Zurikov, 1986
- Chrysotus lobatus Wei, 2018
- Chrysotus lobipes Parent, 1934
- Chrysotus logvinovskii Negrobov & Tsurikov, 2000
- Chrysotus longaevus Wei, 2018
- Chrysotus longgongensis Wei, 2018
- Chrysotus longiconicus Wei, Zhang & Zhou, 2014
- Chrysotus longicornus Wei, 2012
- Chrysotus longihirtus Van Duzee, 1932
- Chrysotus longimanus Loew, 1861
- Chrysotus longinquus Wei, Zhang & Zhou, 2014
- Chrysotus longipalpus Aldrich, 1896
- Chrysotus longiprojicienus Wei, Zhang & Zhou, 2014
- Chrysotus longipulvillus Wei, 2018
- Chrysotus longisetus Wei, 2018
- Chrysotus longiventris Van Duzee, 1931
- Chrysotus longus Wei, Zhang & Zhou, 2014
- Chrysotus luoyangensis Wang & Yang, 2008
- Chrysotus luteipalpus (Parent, 1929)
- Chrysotus lvguantunus Wei, 2012
- Chrysotus lygistus Wei, Zhang & Zhou, 2014
- Chrysotus maculatus (Parent, 1934)
- Chrysotus madidus Wei & Yang, 2007
- Chrysotus magnus Wei, Zhang & Zhou, 2014
- Chrysotus magnuscaputus Liu, Bian, Wang & Yang, 2016
- Chrysotus major Van Duzee, 1924
- Chrysotus malachiticus Speiser, 1910
- Chrysotus masunagai Negrobov, Kumazawa & Tago, 2016
- Chrysotus mccreadiei Runyon & Capellari, 2018
- Chrysotus mediocaudatus Robinson, 1975
- Chrysotus mediotinctus (Becker, 1922)
- Chrysotus megaloceras Meuffels & Grootaert, 1999
- Chrysotus melampodius Loew, 1857
- Chrysotus metatarsatus Becker, 1922
- Chrysotus microtatus Meuffels & Grootaert, 1999
- Chrysotus micrus Wei, Zhang & Zhou, 2014
- Chrysotus millardi Meuffels & Grootaert, 1999
- Chrysotus milvadu Runyon, 2020
- Chrysotus minor Parent, 1931
- Chrysotus minusculus Wei, Zhang & Zhou, 2014
- Chrysotus minuticapillatus Liu, Przhiboro & Yang in Wang, Liu, Przhiboro & Yang, 2016
- Chrysotus minuticornis Van Duzee, 1927
- Chrysotus minutus Wei, Zhang & Zhou, 2014
- Chrysotus mirandus Van Duzee, 1927
- Chrysotus miripalpus Parent, 1928
- Chrysotus mobilis Becker, 1924
- Chrysotus modestus Parent, 1928
- Chrysotus monochaetus Kowarz, 1874
- Chrysotus monticola Negrobov & Maslova, 1995
- Chrysotus montserratensis Runyon, 2020
- Chrysotus morrisoni Van Duzee, 1924
- Chrysotus motuoensis Liu, Wang & Yang, 2013
- Chrysotus mucronatus Wei, Zhang & Zhou, 2014
- Chrysotus mundus (Loew, 1861)
- Chrysotus muricatus Wei, Zhang & Zhou, 2014
- Chrysotus mystax Runyon & Capellari, 2018
- Chrysotus namaicunensis Liu, Wang & Yang, 2013
- Chrysotus nanjiangus Wei, 2018
- Chrysotus nanjingensis Wang & Yang, 2008
- Chrysotus nanus Parent, 1928
- Chrysotus negansus Wei, Zhang & Zhou, 2014
- Chrysotus neglectus (Wiedemann, 1817)
- Chrysotus neimengguensis Liu, Wang & Yang, 2016
- Chrysotus neopedionomus Capellari, 2015
- Chrysotus neopicticornis Robinson, 1967
- Chrysotus neoselandensis Parent, 1933
- Chrysotus nigerus Wei, Zhang & Zhou, 2014
- Chrysotus nigerusoides Wei, Zhang & Zhou, 2014
- Chrysotus nigriciliatus Van Duzee, 1933
- Chrysotus nigrifrons Parent, 1929
- Chrysotus nigripalpis Van Duzee, 1924
- Chrysotus nigrisetus Zhou & Wei, 2017
- Chrysotus nitidus Zhou & Wei, 2017
- Chrysotus noctus Wei, Zhang & Zhou, 2014
- Chrysotus nudipes Van Duzee, 1924
- Chrysotus nudisetus Negrobov & Maslova, 1995
- Chrysotus nudus Becker, 1918
- Chrysotus obliquus Loew, 1861
- Chrysotus oblongus (Parent, 1928)
- Chrysotus obscuripes Zetterstedt, 1838
- Chrysotus occidentalis (Van Duzee, 1915)
- Chrysotus occultus Wei, Zhang & Zhou, 2014
- Chrysotus ochropus Thomson, 1869
- Chrysotus ochthus Wei, Zhang & Zhou, 2014
- Chrysotus olerus Wei, Zhang & Zhou, 2014
- Chrysotus opeatus Wei, Zhang & Zhou, 2014
- Chrysotus orichalceus Gosseries, 1989
- Chrysotus orientalis Negrobov & Tsurikov, 2000
- Chrysotus ovalicornis Parent, 1934
- Chrysotus ovarius Wei, Zhang & Zhou, 2014
- Chrysotus pachystoma Capellari, 2015
- Chrysotus pallidus Wei & Zhang, 2010
- Chrysotus pallipes Loew, 1861
- Chrysotus palmatus (Vanschuytbroeck, 1952)
- Chrysotus palparis Becker, 1922
- Chrysotus palpatus Parent, 1928
- Chrysotus palpiger (Wheeler, 1890)
- Chrysotus palustris Verrall, 1876
- Chrysotus pandanus Wei, 2018
- Chrysotus pandus Wei, 2018
- Chrysotus papuanus Meuffels & Grootaert, 1996
- Chrysotus paradoxus Aldrich, 1902
- Chrysotus parallelus Wei, Zhang & Zhou, 2014
- Chrysotus parapicalis Bickel & Dyte, 1989
- Chrysotus parastylus Wei, 2018
- Chrysotus paratinus Wei, Zhang & Zhou, 2014
- Chrysotus paratrullus Wei, 2018
- Chrysotus parilis Parent, 1926
- Chrysotus parvicornis Van Duzee, 1924
- Chrysotus parvipalpus Van Duzee, 1931
- Chrysotus parvulus (Aldrich, 1896)
- Chrysotus pasccus Wei, 2018
- Chrysotus pauli Meuffels & Grootaert, 1999
- Chrysotus pauliansulus Wei, Zhang & Zhou, 2014
- Chrysotus pectoralis Van Duzee, 1924
- Chrysotus peculiariter Negrobov & Maslova, 2000
- Chrysotus pengzhouensis Wei, Zhang & Zhou, 2014
- Chrysotus pennatus Lichtwardt, 1902
- Chrysotus peregrinus Parent, 1931
- Chrysotus petilus Wei, 2018
- Chrysotus philtrum Melander, 1903
- Chrysotus picticornis Loew, 1862
- Chrysotus pictipes Becker, 1922
- Chrysotus pilbarensis Bickel, 2013
- Chrysotus pilicornis Becker, 1914
- Chrysotus pilitibia Negrobov & Maslova, 1995
- Chrysotus piscicaudatus Wei, 2018
- Chrysotus plumarista Runyon & Capellari, 2018
- Chrysotus polaris Negrobov & Maslova, 2000
- Chrysotus polleti Olejníček, 1999
- Chrysotus polychaetus Frey, 1945
- Chrysotus pomeroyi Parent, 1934
- Chrysotus prominentus Wei, Zhang & Zhou, 2014
- Chrysotus propinquus (Becker, 1922)
- Chrysotus proximus Aldrich, 1896
- Chrysotus pseudexcisus Robinson, 1975
- Chrysotus pseudocilipes Hollis, 1964
- Chrysotus pseudoniger Robinson, 1975
- Chrysotus pudingus Wei, Zhang & Zhou, 2014
- Chrysotus pulchellus Kowarz, 1874
- Chrysotus pulcher Parent, 1926
- Chrysotus putus Wei, 2018
- Chrysotus pygmaeus Parent, 1934
- Chrysotus qianus Wei & Yang, 2007
- Chrysotus qingzhenus Zhou & Wei, 2017
- Chrysotus quadrangulus Wei, Zhang & Zhou, 2014
- Chrysotus quadratus (Van Duzee, 1915)
- Chrysotus rauterbergi (Wheeler, 1890)
- Chrysotus rectiserialus Wei, 2018
- Chrysotus rectisystylus Wei, 2012
- Chrysotus rectus Wei, Zhang & Zhou, 2014
- Chrysotus renhuaiensis Wei, Zhang & Zhou, 2014
- Chrysotus repandus (Van Duzee, 1915)
- Chrysotus ringdahli Parent, 1929
- Chrysotus robustus (Robinson, 1975):
- Chrysotus rostratus Bigot, 1890
- Chrysotus rubzovi Negrobov & Maslova, 1995
- Chrysotus runyoni Grichanov, 2017
- Chrysotus rutshuruensis (Vanschuytbroeck, 1951)
- Chrysotus sagittus Wei, 2018
- Chrysotus saigusai Negrobov, Kumazawa & Tago, 2016
- Chrysotus salientibus Wei, Zhang & Zhou, 2014
- Chrysotus separatus Wei, Zhang & Zhou, 2014
- Chrysotus serratus Wang & Yang, 2006
- Chrysotus setifemurus Wei, Zhang & Zhou, 2014
- Chrysotus setifer Parent, 1932
- Chrysotus setulitibius Wei, Zhang & Zhou, 2014
- Chrysotus seychellensis Lamb, 1922
- Chrysotus shamshevi Negrobov, Selivanova & Maslova, 2016
- Chrysotus shanxiensis Liu, Wang & Yang, 2015
- Chrysotus shuensis Liu & Yang in Liu, Zhong, Zhang & Yang, 2020
- Chrysotus sibiricus Negrobov & Maslova, 1995
- Chrysotus silvicola Harmston, 1951
- Chrysotus simplicibus Wei, 2018
- Chrysotus simulans Van Duzee, 1924
- Chrysotus singularis Parent, 1931
- Chrysotus sinuolatus Wang & Yang, 2008
- Chrysotus smithi Negrobov, 1980
- Chrysotus sodalis (Loew, 1861)
- Chrysotus soya Runyon, 2022
- Chrysotus soleatus Becker, 1922
- Chrysotus spectabilis (Loew, 1861)
- Chrysotus sphaericus Wei, Zhang & Zhou, 2014
- Chrysotus spinipes Van Duzee, 1924
- Chrysotus spoliaretus Wei, Zhang & Zhou, 2014
- Chrysotus squamae Liu & Yang, 2019
- †Chrysotus stanciui Parent, 1936
- Chrysotus straeleni Vanschuytbroeck, 1951
- Chrysotus suavis Loew, 1857
- Chrysotus subapicalis Becker, 1922
- Chrysotus subcaudatus Robinson, 1975
- Chrysotus subcostatus Loew, 1864
- Chrysotus subguanlingus Wei, 2012
- Chrysotus subjectus Van Duzee, 1924
- Chrysotus sublatus Wei, 2018
- Chrysotus sublongicornus Wei, 2012
- Chrysotus submuricatus Wei, Zhang & Zhou, 2014
- Chrysotus substrictus Wei, Zhang & Zhou, 2014
- Chrysotus suiyangus Wei, 2018
- Chrysotus supinatus Wei, Zhang & Zhou, 2014
- Chrysotus tagoi Negrobov, Maslova & Fursov, 2015
- Chrysotus tarsalis Van Duzee, 1924
- Chrysotus teapanus Aldrich, 1901
- Chrysotus tengchongus Wei, 2018
- Chrysotus tennesseensis Robinson, 1964
- Chrysotus terminalis Van Duzee, 1924
- Chrysotus thornpenis Liu, Wang & Yang, 2015
- Chrysotus thornus Wei, Zhang & Zhou, 2014
- Chrysotus tibetensis Liu, Wang & Yang, 2013
- Chrysotus tibialis Van Duzee, 1924
- Chrysotus tortus Wei, Zhang & Zhou, 2014
- Chrysotus transversus Wei, 2018
- Chrysotus trapezinus Wei & Zhang, 2010
- Chrysotus triangularis Van Duzee, 1924
- Chrysotus triangulatus (Van Duzee, 1915)
- Chrysotus triangulus Wei, Zhang & Zhou, 2014
- Chrysotus tricaudatus Negrobov, Barkalov & Selivanova, 2014
- Chrysotus tricolor Robinson, 1975
- Chrysotus triprojicienus Liu, Liang & Yang, 2017
- Chrysotus trullus Wei, 2018
- Chrysotus tumidipes Becker, 1922
- Chrysotus tumilus Wei, Zhang & Zhou, 2014
- Chrysotus uncus Wei, Zhang & Zhou, 2014
- Chrysotus undamus Wei, Zhang & Zhou, 2014
- Chrysotus unicolor Becker, 1919
- Chrysotus uniseriatus Parent, 1933
- Chrysotus unumprojicienus Liu & Yang, 2019
- Chrysotus upembaensis (Vanschuytbroeck, 1952)
- Chrysotus usitatus (Van Duzee, 1915)
- Chrysotus vanduzeei (Robinson, 1964)
- Chrysotus variabilis (Van Duzee, 1915)
- Chrysotus varipes Van Duzee, 1924
- Chrysotus velox Parent, 1931
- Chrysotus ventriprojicientus Wei, 2018
- Chrysotus verecundus Parent, 1933
- Chrysotus verralli Parent, 1923
- Chrysotus vicinus (Becker, 1922)
- Chrysotus viridifemoratus von Roser, 1840
- Chrysotus viridis Becker, 1922
- Chrysotus virtus Wei, 2018
- Chrysotus vividus Loew, 1864
- Chrysotus vladimiri Negrobov & Maslova, 1995
- Chrysotus vockerothi Pollet in Pollet, Brooks & Cumming, 2004
- Chrysotus vulgaris Van Duzee, 1924
- Chrysotus vulcanicola Frey, 1945
- Chrysotus weii Zhou, 2016
- Chrysotus wirthi (Robinson, 1975)
- Chrysotus wisconsinensis Wheeler, 1890
- Chrysotus wulfi (Parent, 1936)
- Chrysotus xanthocal Harmston & Knowlton, 1940
- Chrysotus xanthoprasius Bezzi, 1906
- Chrysotus xiaolongmensis Wang & Yang, 2006
- Chrysotus xiaominae Liu, Liang & Yang, 2017
- Chrysotus xinanus Wei & Zhang, 2010
- Chrysotus xinjiangensis Wang & Yang, 2008
- Chrysotus xiphostoma Robinson, 1975
- Chrysotus xishuangbannaensis Wei, 2018
- Chrysotus xishuiensis Wei, Zhang & Zhou, 2014
- Chrysotus zhangi Wang & Yang, 2008
- Chrysotus zhijinus Wei, 2018
- Chrysotus zhouae Liu, Bian, Wang & Yang, 2016
- Chrysotus zhuae Wang & Yang, 2008
- Chrysotus ziphus Wei, Zhang & Zhou, 2014
- Chrysotus ziyunus Wei, 2018
- Chrysotus zlobiniani Negrobov & Maslova, 1995
- Chrysotus zorus Wei, 2018
- Chrysotus zumbadoi Capellari, 2015

Unrecognised species:

- Chrysotus basalis Philippi, 1865
- Chrysotus bicolor Macquart, 1827
- Chrysotus chinensis Wiedemann, 1830
- Chrysotus concinnarius Say, 1829
- Chrysotus deremptus (Walker, 1849)
- Chrysotus incertus Walker, 1849
- Chrysotus nigripes (Fabricius, 1794)
- Chrysotus nubilus Say, 1829
- Chrysotus rufipes Meigen, 1838
- Chrysotus virescens von Roser, 1840
- Chrysotus viridifemora Macquart, 1850

The following species are synonyms of other species:

- Chrysotus albifacies (Parent, 1929): Synonym of C. aldrichi (Van Duzee, 1915)
- Chrysotus alterum Becker, 1922: Synonym of C. alternus Becker, 1922
- Chrysotus amplicornis Kowarz, 1874: Synonym of C. obscuripes Zetterstedt, 1838
- Chrysotus amplicornis Zetterstedt, 1849: Synonym of C. laesus (Wiedemann, 1817)
- Chrysotus andorrensis Parent, 1938: Synonym of C. gramineus (Fallén, 1823)
- Chrysotus andreji Negrobov, 1986: Synonym of C. andrei Negrobov, 1986
- Chrysotus angulicornis Buchmann, 1961: Synonym of C. gramineus (Fallén, 1823)
- Chrysotus approximatus (Aldrich, 1896): Synonym of C. spectabilis (Loew, 1861)
- Chrysotus arvernicus Vaillant & Brunhes, 1980: Synonym of C. gramineus (Fallén, 1823)
- Chrysotus atripes von Roser, 1840: Synonym of C. cupreus Macquart, 1827
- Chrysotus azoricus Frey, 1945: Synonym of C. elongatus Parent, 1934
- Chrysotus brevispina Van Duzee, 1933: Synonym of C. brevicornis Van Duzee, 1933
- Chrysotus callidus Parent, 1944: Synonym of C. cilipes Meigen, 1824
- Chrysotus ciliatus Malloch, 1914: Synonym of C. choricus Wheeler, 1890
- Chrysotus cobaltinus Van Duzee, 1924: Synonym of C. discolor Loew, 1861
- Chrysotus communis Van Duzee, 1932: Synonym of C. vanduzeei (Robinson, 1964)
- Chrysotus copiosus Meigen, 1824: Synonym of C. neglectus (Wiedemann, 1817)
- Chrysotus costatus Van Duzee, 1915: Synonym of C. costalis Loew, 1861
- Chrysotus diligens Parent, 1931: Synonym of C. viridis Becker, 1922
- Chrysotus dubius Van Duzee, 1924: Synonym of C. hirtipes Van Duzee, 1924
- Chrysotus enderleini Parent, 1938: Synonym of C. laesus (Wiedemann, 1817)
- Chrysotus exiguus Van Duzee, 1924: Synonym of C. parvicornis Van Duzee, 1924
- Chrysotus exunguis (Thomson, 1869): Synonym of C spectabilis (Loew, 1861)
- Chrysotus facialis Gerstäcker, 1864: Synonym of C. gramineus (Fallén, 1823)
- Chrysotus fascialis Becker, 1918: Synonym of C. gramineus (Fallén, 1823)
- Chrysotus femoralis Meigen, 1824: Synonym of C. neglectus (Wiedemann, 1817)
- Chrysotus flavipalpis Van Duzee, 1930: Synonym of C. ochropus Thomson, 1869
- Chrysotus flavohirtus Robinson, 1970: Synonym of C. fulvohirtus Van Duzee, 1915
- Chrysotus gramineus Meigen, 1838: Synonym of C. varians Kowarz, 1874
- Chrysotus infuscatus (Van Duzee, 1915): Synonym of C. leucostoma (Loew, 1861)
- Chrysotus insularis (Parent, 1933): Synonym of C. insularis (Lamb, 1933)
- Chrysotus intermedius Frey, 1945: Synonym of C. polychaetus Frey, 1945
- Chrysotus kowarzi Lundbeck, 1912: Synonym of C. obscuripes Zetterstedt, 1838
- Chrysotus laesus (Fallén, 1823): Synonym of C. gramineus (Fallén, 1823)
- Chrysotus latifacies Van Duzee, 1933: Synonym of C. brevicornis Van Duzee, 1933
- Chrysotus licenti Parent, 1944: Synonym of C. femoratus Zetterstedt, 1843
- Chrysotus longipalpus Edwards, 1932: Synonym of C. longipalpus Aldrich, 1896
- Chrysotus longipes Van Duzee, 1927: Synonym of C. parvulus (Aldrich, 1896)
- Chrysotus lundbladi Frey, 1939: Synonym of C. neglectus (Wiedemann, 1817)
- Chrysotus magnipalpus Van Duzee, 1927: Synonym of C. crosbyi Van Duzee, 1924
- Chrysotus melanopus Parent, 1926: Synonym of C. cupreus Macquart, 1827
- Chrysotus mexicanus Robinson, 1967: Synonym of C. brevicornis Van Duzee, 1933
- Chrysotus microcerus Kowarz, 1874: Synonym of C. gramineus (Fallén, 1823)
- Chrysotus minimus (Meigen, 1830): Synonym of C. gramineus (Fallén, 1823)
- Chrysotus minor Frey, 1945: Synonym of C. polychaetus Frey, 1945
- Chrysotus miritibia Parent, 1933: Synonym of C. brevitibia Van Duzee, 1927
- Chrysotus neotropicus Dyte, 1980: synonym of C. hirsutus Aldrich, 1896
- Chrysotus nigerrimus Becker, 1918: Synonym of C. alpicola Strobl, 1893
- Chrysotus nigripes Meigen, 1824: Mixed species – C. gramineus (Fallén, 1823), C. laesus (Wiedemann, 1817) and C. varians Kowarz, 1874
- Chrysotus pallidipalpus Van Duzee, 1933: Synonym of C. longipalpus Aldrich, 1896
- Chrysotus plagius (Vanschuytbroeck, 1952): Synonym of C. upembaensis (Vanschuytbroeck, 1952)
- Chrysotus pratincola Wheeler, 1890: Synonym of C. subcostatus Loew, 1864
- Chrysotus pulvillatus Parent, 1920: Synonym of C. varians Kowarz, 1874
- Chrysotus romanicus Pârvu, 1995: Synonym of C. viridifemoratus von Roser, 1840
- Chrysotus sagittarius Van Duzee, 1924: Synonym of C. longipalpus Aldrich, 1896
- Chrysotus setosus Van Duzee, 1931 (preoccupied by C. setosus Giebel, 1856): synonym of C. hirsutus Aldrich, 1896
- Chrysotus spinifer Malloch, 1914: Synonym of C. palpiger (Wheeler, 1890)
- Chrysotus subciliatus Frey, 1945: Synonym of C. elongatus Parent, 1934
- Chrysotus taeniomerus Meigen, 1830: Synonym of C. neglectus (Wiedemann, 1817)
- Chrysotus varians Kowarz, 1874: Synonym of C. gramineus (Fallén, 1823)
- Chrysotus viridulus (Fallén, 1823): Synonym of C. neglectus (Wiedemann, 1817)
- Chrysotus vittatas (Van Duzee, 1915): Synonym of C. leucostoma (Loew, 1861)
- Chrysotus vittatus (Van Duzee, 1915): Synonym of C. leucostoma (Loew, 1861)
- Chrysotus vulgaris Van Duzee, 1933 (preoccupied by C. vulgaris Van Duzee, 1924): Synonym of C. longipalpus Aldrich, 1896
- Chrysotus wisconensis Foot et al, 1965: Synonym of C. wisconsinensis Wheeler, 1890
- Chrysotus zlobini Negrobov, 2000: Synonym of C. zlobiniani Negrobov & Maslova, 1995

The following species were moved to other genera:

- Chrysotus abdominalis Say, 1829: moved to Thrypticus
- Chrysotus albisignatus Becker, 1924: moved to Sympycnus
- Chrysotus americanus (Wheeler, 1896): moved to Achradocera, synonym of Achradocera barbata (Loew, 1861)
- Chrysotus angustifacies (Becker, 1922): moved to Achradocera, synonym of Achradocera apicalis (Aldrich, 1896)
- Chrysotus annulatus Macquart, 1842: moved to Lyroneurus
- Chrysotus apicalis Aldrich, 1896: moved to Achradocera
- Chrysotus arcuatus Van Duzee, 1924: moved to Achradocera
- Chrysotus barbatus (Loew, 1861): moved to Achradocera
- Chrysotus basilaris Curran, 1924: moved to Sympycnus
- Chrysotus brasiliensis Van Duzee, 1933: moved to Micromorphus
- Chrysotus chilensis Van Duzee, 1930: moved to Achradocera
- Chrysotus cinerellus Zetterstedt, 1838: moved to Sympycnus, synonym of Sympycnus pulicarius (Fallén, 1823)
- Chrysotus concinnarius Say, 1829: moved to Diaphorus
- Chrysotus contractus Van Duzee, 1929: moved to Achradocera
- Chrysotus cupreus (Macquart, 1839): moved to Campsicnemus
- Chrysotus distendens Meigen, 1824: moved to Nematoproctus
- Chrysotus diversus Zetterstedt, 1843: moved to Chrysotimus, synonym of Chrysotimus molliculus (Fallén, 1823)
- Chrysotus divisus Strobl, 1880: moved to Thrypticus
- Chrysotus edwardsi Van Duzee, 1930: moved to Achradocera
- Chrysotus exactus Walker, 1859: moved to Asyndetus
- Chrysotus excavatus Van Duzee, 1924: moved to Achradocera
- Chrysotus femoralis (Becker, 1922): moved to Achradocera
- Chrysotus femoratus Bigot, 1890: moved to Achradocera
- Chrysotus flavipes von Roser, 1840: moved to Medetera, synonym of Medetera insignis Girschner, 1888
- Chrysotus flaviventris von Roser, 1840: moved to Chrysotimus
- Chrysotus flavus Aldrich, 1896: moved to Xanthina
- Chrysotus hawaiiensis Grimshaw, 1901: moved to Eurynogaster
- Chrysotus incumbens Becker, 1924: moved to Diaphorus
- Chrysotus insignis (Parent, 1933): moved to Achradocera
- Chrysotus laetus Meigen, 1824: moved to Chrysotimus, synonym of Chrysotimus molliculus (Fallén, 1823)
- Chrysotus lividiventris Becker, 1924: moved to Diaphorus
- Chrysotus longiseta (Parent, 1933): moved to Achradocera
- Chrysotus luctuosus Bigot, 1888: moved to Sympycnus
- Chrysotus magnicornis Zetterstedt, 1843: moved to Rhaphium
- Chrysotus meridionalis (Becker, 1922): moved to Achradocera
- Chrysotus molliculus (Fallén, 1823): moved to Chrysotimus
- Chrysotus niger Loew, 1869: moved to Acropsilus
- Chrysotus nigricilius Loew, 1871: moved to Melanostolus
- Chrysotus nigricosta von Roser, 1840: moved to Teuchophorus
- Chrysotus parthenus Hardy & Kohn, 1964: moved to Diaphorus
- Chrysotus parvus Van Duzee, 1924: moved to Telmaturgus
- Chrysotus pumilus (Meigen, 1824): moved to Syntormon
- Chrysotus quadratus Van Duzee, 1924: moved to Thinophilus, synonym of Thinophilus viridifacies Van Duzee, 1924
- Chrysotus rhaphioides Zetterstedt, 1838: moved to Hercostomus, synonym of Hercostomus metallicus (Stannius, 1831)
- Chrysotus satrapa (Wheeler, 1890): moved to Diaphorus
- Chrysotus saxatilis Grimshaw, 1901: moved to Elmoia
- Chrysotus shannoni Van Duzee, 1930: moved to Achradocera
- Chrysotus signatus Zetterstedt, 1849: moved to Telmaturgus, synonym of Teuchophorus nigricosta (von Roser, 1840)
- Chrysotus spiniger Grimshaw, 1901: moved to Eurynogaster
- Chrysotus superbus Vanschuytbroeck, 1951: moved to Telmaturgus, synonym of Telmaturgus munroi (Curran, 1925)
- Chrysotus thoracicus Philippi, 1865: moved to Achalcus
- Chrysotus tuberculatus Van Duzee, 1931: moved to Achradocera
- Chrysotus validus Loew, 1861: moved to Achradocera, synonym of Achradocera barbata (Loew, 1861)
- †Chrysotus decorus Meunier, 1907: moved to Plesiomedetera
- †Chrysotus lepidus Meunier, 1907: moved to Plesiomedetera
- †Chrysotus praeconcinnus Evenhuis, 1994 (= Chrysotus concinnus Meunier, 1907): moved to Palaeomedeterus

The following species were renamed:

- Chrysotus aldrichi Van Duzee, 1924: renamed to C. vockerothi Pollet in Pollet, Brooks & Cumming, 2004
- Chrysotus annulatus Van Duzee, 1924: renamed to C. millardi Meuffels & Grootaert, 1999
- Chrysotus apicalis Parent, 1932: renamed to C. parapicalis Bickel & Dyte, 1989
- Chrysotus bicolor Vanschuytbroeck, 1951: renamed to C. pauli Meuffels & Grootaert, 1999
- Chrysotus caudatus Van Duzee, 1931: renamed to C. caudatulus Van Duzee, 1932
- Chrysotus disjunctus Van Duzee, 1924: renamed to Diaphorus millardi Meuffels & Grootaert, 1999
- Chrysotus flavus Vanschuytbroeck, 1957: renamed to C. madagascariensis Dyte & Smith, 1980 (now in Peloropeodes)
- Chrysotus infirmus Wei, Zhang & Zhou, 2014: renamed to C. weii Zhou, 2016
- Chrysotus magnicornis Parent, 1928: renamed to C. grandicornis Parent, 1930
- Chrysotus magnicornis Van Duzee, 1924: renamed to C. megaloceras Meuffels & Grootaert, 1999
- Chrysotus minimus Robinson, 1975: renamed to C. microtatus Meuffels & Grootaert, 1999
- Chrysotus nudus Harmston & Knowlton, 1963: renamed to C. harmstoni Meuffels & Grootaert, 1999
- Chrysotus parvulus Van Duzee, 1924: renamed to C. milvadu Runyon, 2020
- Chrysotus quadratus Wang & Yang, 2006: renamed to C. liui Wang & Yang, 2008
- Chrysotus vicinus Parent, 1933: renamed to C. kallweiti Capellari & Amorim, 2014

The following species are unplaced in the family Dolichopodidae:

- †Chrysotus setosus Giebel, 1856

The following species are nomina nuda:

- †Chrysotus antipellus Keilbach, 1982
- †Chrysotus apicalis Keilbach, 1982
- †Chrysotus ciliatus Keilbach, 1982
- †Chrysotus dasycerus Keilbach, 1982
- †Chrysotus delecocerus Keilbach, 1982
- †Chrysotus furcatus Keilbach, 1982
- Chrysotus ringdahli Ringdahl, 1928
- Chrysotus rotundus Wei, Zhang & Zhou, 2014
- †Chrysotus semiciliatus Keilbach, 1982
- †Chrysotus stylatus Keilbach, 1982
- †Chrysotus terminaeus Keilbach, 1982
- Chrysotus tibialis Stephens, 1829
