= Aphasmaphleps =

Scientific classification
- Kingdom: Animalia
- Phylum: Arthropoda
- Class: Insecta
- Order: Diptera
- Family: Dolichopodidae
- Subfamily: Diaphorinae
- Genus: Aphasmaphleps; Grichanov, 2010

Type species
- Aphasmaphleps bandia Grichanov, 2010

Genus of flies

Aphasmaphleps is a genus of flies in the family Dolichopodidae from the Afrotropical realm. The genus was first described by Igor Grichanov in 2010. The name Aphasmaphleps refers to the genus Phasmaphleps, which was originally considered to be closely related to it. According to Capellari & Grichanov (2012), Aphasmaphleps more closely resembles Asyndetus and Cryptophleps.

== Species ==
The genus contains four species:

- Aphasmaphleps bandia Grichanov, 2010
- Aphasmaphleps bickeli Capellari & Grichanov, 2012
- Aphasmaphleps paulyi Capellari & Grichanov, 2012
- Aphasmaphleps stuckenbergi Capellari & Grichanov, 2012
