= Dactylonotus =

Scientific classification
- Kingdom: Animalia
- Phylum: Arthropoda
- Class: Insecta
- Order: Diptera
- Family: Dolichopodidae
- Subfamily: Diaphorinae
- Tribe: Argyrini
- Genus: Dactylonotus; Parent, 1934

Type species
- Dactylonotus grandicornis Parent, 1934

Genus of flies

Dactylonotus is a genus of flies in the family Dolichopodidae. Six of the species in the genus are found in southern Africa, though one species, Dactylonotus formosus, is found in New Zealand. The genus is recognised by its distinctive antennae, which have a finger-like projection on the pedicel (the second segment) that overlaps the top of the postpedicel (the first unit of the third segment, the flagellum).

== Taxonomy ==
When first described, Dactylonotus was provisionally included in the subfamily Rhaphiinae and considered to be related to Syntormon. However, Syntormon would later be transferred to the subfamily Sympycninae, while Dactylonotus itself was later determined to be related to Argyra, and is currently classified instead in the subfamily Diaphorinae in the tribe Argyrini. A cladistic analysis of the subfamily Diaphorinae published in 2013 suggested that a group of genera consisting of Anepsiomyia, Argyra, Dactylomyia, Somillus and Symbolia would be monophyletic and possibly deserves subfamily rank.

== Species ==
- Dactylonotus formosus (Parent, 1933) – New Zealand
- Dactylonotus frater Parent, 1939 – Zimbabwe
- Dactylonotus grandicornis Parent, 1934 – South Africa
- Dactylonotus nigricorpus Grichanov, 2016 – South Africa (Western Cape)
- Dactylonotus rudebecki Vanschuytbroeck, 1960 – South Africa (Western Cape)
- Dactylonotus tsitsikamma Grichanov, 2016 – South Africa (Eastern Cape)
- Dactylonotus univittatus (Loew, 1858) – South Africa

Dactylonotus meuffelsi Grichanov, 1998 is a synonym of D. rudebecki Vanschuytbroeck, 1960.
