= Falbouria =

Conservation status
- Data Deficient (IUCN 3.1)

Scientific classification
- Kingdom: Animalia
- Phylum: Arthropoda
- Class: Insecta
- Order: Diptera
- Family: Dolichopodidae
- Subfamily: Diaphorinae
- Tribe: Diaphorini
- Genus: Falbouria; Dyte, 1980
- Species: F. acorensis

Binomial name
- Falbouria acorensis (Parent, 1933)

Synonyms
- Genus: Balfouria Parent, 1933 (nec Crosse, 1884); Species: Balfouria acorensis Parent, 1933

Genus of flies

Falbouria is a genus of flies in the family Dolichopodidae. It contains only one species, Falbouria acorensis, which is endemic to the Azores. The genus was originally named Balfouria by Octave Parent in 1933; it was renamed to Falbouria by Peter Dyte in 1980, after the name Balfouria was found to be preoccupied by the snail genus Balfouria Crosse, 1884.

== Systematic position ==
The genus Falbouria was placed in the tribe Argyrini by Maslova and Negrobov (1996). Later, on re-describing the type species of the genus, Capellari and Amorim (2012) found the genus shares some features with Achradocera, Chrysotus, and Lyroneurus, so they place it in Diaphorini instead. Falbouria is placed close to Chrysotus by these authors, but is kept as a separate genus rather than becoming a synonym of Chrysotus (which is itself paraphyletic).

== Distribution ==
Falbouria acorensis is an endemic species to the Azores. It is known to be present on São Miguel Island. It was historically also recorded from Flores, Faial, Pico and São Jorge islands, though no recent information on the species exists for these islands.
