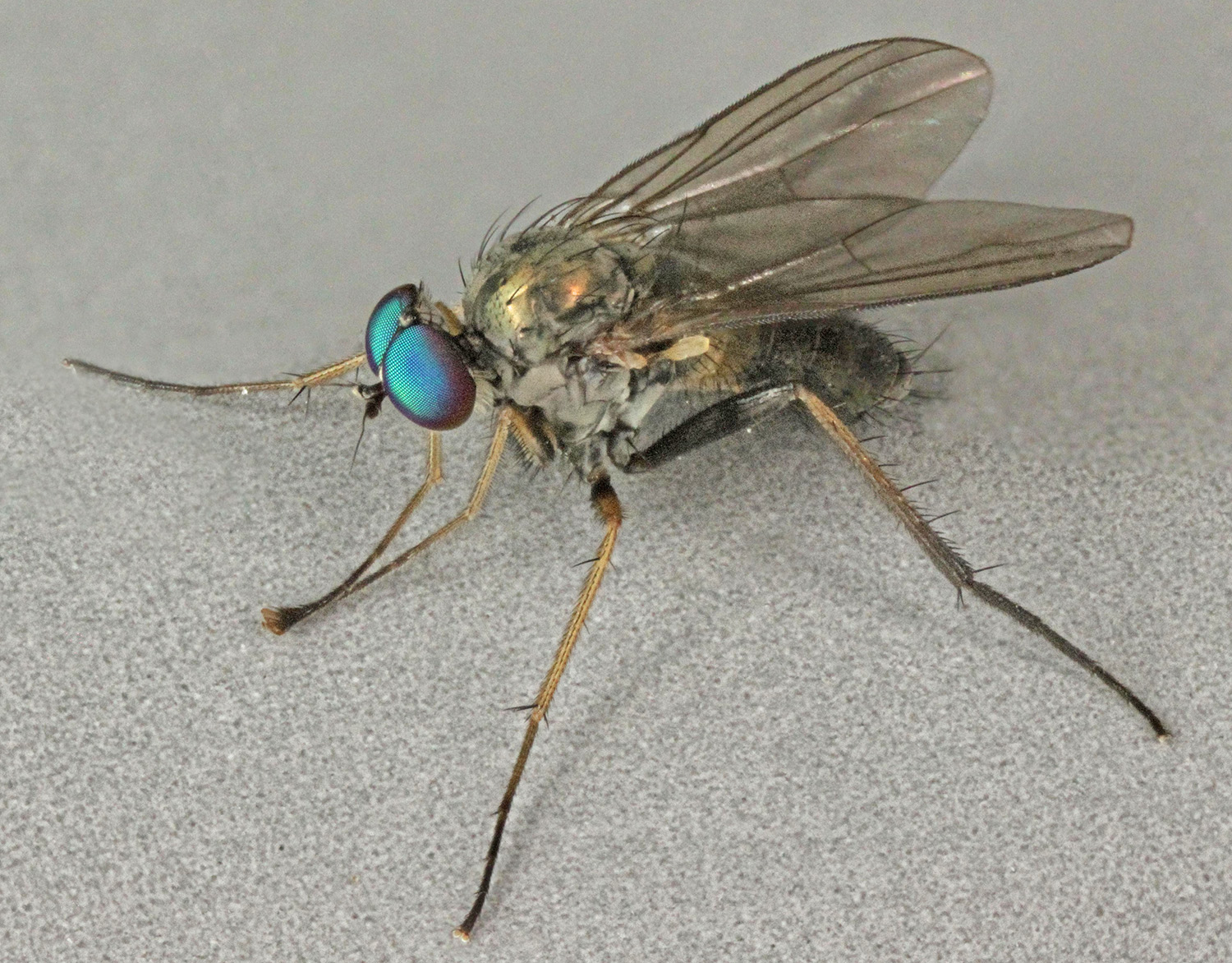
- Diaphorus oculatus

Scientific classification
- Kingdom: Animalia
- Phylum: Arthropoda
- Clade: Pancrustacea
- Class: Insecta
- Order: Diptera
- Family: Dolichopodidae
- Subfamily: Diaphorinae
- Tribe: Diaphorini
- Genus: Diaphorus; Meigen, 1824

Type species
- Diaphorus flavocinctus (= Dolichopus oculatus Fallén, 1823) Meigen, 1824

Synonyms
- Brachypus Meigen, 1824; Diaphora Macquart, 1834; Munroiana Curran, 1924

= Diaphorus =

Genus of flies

Diaphorus is a genus of flies in the family Dolichopodidae. Lyroneurus was formerly considered a subgenus, but is now either treated as a synonym of Chrysotus or treated as a distinct genus.

== Species ==
- Diaphorus abruptus Van Duzee, 1931
- Diaphorus adumbratus Parent, 1931
- Diaphorus africus Parent, 1924
- Diaphorus alacer Parent, 1934
- Diaphorus alamaculatus Yang & Grootaert, 1999
- Diaphorus albiciliatus Van Duzee, 1915
- Diaphorus alienus Van Duzee, 1915
- Diaphorus alligatus (Walker, 1856)
- †Diaphorus alsiosus (Meunier, 1910)
- Diaphorus amazonicus Parent, 1930
- Diaphorus amoenus Aldrich, 1902
- Diaphorus amplus Curran, 1926
- Diaphorus anatoli Negrobov, 1986
- Diaphorus angusticinctus De Meijere, 1916
- Diaphorus anomalus Parent, 1937
- Diaphorus antennatus Van Duzee, 1915
- Diaphorus apicalis De Meijere, 1910
- Diaphorus apiciniger Yang & Saigusa, 2001
- Diaphorus aptatus Becker, 1922
- Diaphorus argenteotomentosus (Kertész, 1901)
- Diaphorus argentifacies Van Duzee, 1932
- Diaphorus argentipalpis Van Duzee, 1923
- Diaphorus athenae Liu & Yang in Liu, Bian, Zhang & Yang, 2018
- Diaphorus australis Van Duzee, 1915
- Diaphorus baechlii Naglis, 2010
- Diaphorus baheensis Liu, Wang & Yang, 2015
- Diaphorus bakeri Robinson, 1967
- Diaphorus basalis Van Duzee, 1915
- Diaphorus basicinctus Parent, 1941
- Diaphorus basiniger Yang & Grootaert, 1999
- Diaphorus becvari Olejníček, 2005
- Diaphorus bezzii Parent, 1925
- Diaphorus biprojicientis Wei & Song, 2005
- Diaphorus biroi Kertész, 1901
- Diaphorus bisetus Yang & Grootaert, 1999
- Diaphorus blandus Parent, 1934
- Diaphorus brevimanus Van Duzee, 1931
- Diaphorus brevinervis Van Duzee, 1924
- Diaphorus brunneus Loew, 1858
- Diaphorus californicus Van Duzee, 1917
- Diaphorus canus Robinson, 1964
- Diaphorus centriflavus Yang & Grootaert, 1999
- Diaphorus chamaeleon Becker, 1922
- Diaphorus chrysotus Parent, 1928
- Diaphorus cilipes Olejníček, 2005
- Diaphorus cilitibia Parent, 1933
- Diaphorus cinctellus De Meijere, 1910
- Diaphorus coaptatus Parent, 1932
- Diaphorus comiumus Wei & Song, 2005
- Diaphorus communis White, 1916
- Diaphorus condignus Becker, 1922
- Diaphorus connexus Wei & Song, 2005
- Diaphorus consanguineus Harmston & Knowlton, 1963
- Diaphorus contiguus Aldrich, 1896
- Diaphorus costaricensis Parent, 1934
- Diaphorus dasycnemus Loew, 1858
- Diaphorus delegatus Walker, 1856
- Diaphorus deliquescens Loew, 1871
- Diaphorus denticulatus Wei & Song, 2006
- Diaphorus despectus Parent, 1939
- Diaphorus detectus Becker, 1922
- Diaphorus dimidiatus Aldrich, 1896
- Diaphorus dioicus Wei & Song, 2006
- Diaphorus discrepans Becker, 1922
- Diaphorus disjunctus Loew, 1857
- Diaphorus distinctus Parent, 1932
- Diaphorus distinguendus Parent, 1928
- Diaphorus divergens Parent, 1939
- Diaphorus dolichocerus Stackelberg, 1947
- Diaphorus dorsalis Verrall, 1876
- Diaphorus dubius Aldrich, 1896
- Diaphorus dyeri Van Duzee, 1931
- Diaphorus ealensis Parent, 1937
- Diaphorus edwardsi Van Duzee, 1930
- Diaphorus elongatus Yang & Grootaert, 1999
- Diaphorus emeiensis Liu & Yang in Liu, Tang, Liang & Yang, 2017
- Diaphorus exarmatus Parent, 1932
- Diaphorus exunguiculatus Parent, 1925
- Diaphorus exungulatus Parent, 1935
- Diaphorus felinus Parent, 1939
- Diaphorus femoratus Walker, 1852
- †Diaphorus fernandi Meuffels & Grootaert, 1999
- Diaphorus flavipilus Becker, 1922
- Diaphorus fulvifrons Parent, 1939
- Diaphorus funeralis Parent, 1929
- Diaphorus fuscus Van Duzee, 1921
- Diaphorus garnetensis Bickel, 2013
- Diaphorus genuinus Parent, 1927
- Diaphorus gibbosus Van Duzee, 1915
- Diaphorus gracilis Parent, 1929
- Diaphorus graecus Parent, 1932
- Diaphorus gredleri Mik, 1881
- Diaphorus guangdongensis Wang, Yang & Grootaert, 2006
- Diaphorus habilis Becker, 1922
- Diaphorus hadesusi Liu & Yang, 2017
- Diaphorus hainanensis Yang & Saigusa, 2001
- Diaphorus halteralis Loew, 1869
- Diaphorus hebeiensis Yang & Grootaert, 1999
- Diaphorus henanensis Yang & Saigusa, 2000
- Diaphorus hilaris Meuffels & Grootaert, 1985
- Diaphorus hirsutipes Becker, 1922
- Diaphorus hirsutus Van Duzee, 1921
- Diaphorus hoffmannseggi Meigen, 1830
- Diaphorus impiger Becker, 1922
- Diaphorus incumbens (Becker, 1924)
- Diaphorus infumatus Parent, 1933
- Diaphorus inglorius Parent, 1933
- Diaphorus inornatus Van Duzee, 1917
- Diaphorus insufficiens Curran, 1925
- Diaphorus insulanus Van Duzee, 1930
- Diaphorus intactus Becker, 1922
- Diaphorus intermedius Robinson, 1964
- Diaphorus intermixtus Becker, 1922
- Diaphorus iowensis Robinson, 1964
- Diaphorus jacobsi Parent, 1922
- Diaphorus jeanae Hollis, 1964
- Diaphorus jinghongensis Wang, Yang & Grootaert, 2006
- Diaphorus jingpingensis Yang & Saigusa, 2002
- Diaphorus junctus Van Duzee, 1917
- Diaphorus karijini Bickel, 2013
- Diaphorus laffooni Robinson, 1964
- Diaphorus lamellatus Loew, 1864
- Diaphorus lateniger Parent, 1939
- Diaphorus latifacies Van Duzee, 1932
- Diaphorus lautus Loew, 1869
- Diaphorus lavinia Curran, 1926
- Diaphorus lawrencei Curran, 1926
- Diaphorus leigongshanus Wei & Yang, 2007
- Diaphorus lichtwardti Parent, 1925
- Diaphorus lividiventris (Becker, 1924)
- Diaphorus lividus Parent, 1941
- Diaphorus livingstonei Vanschuytbroeck, 1964
- Diaphorus longicornis Olejníček, 2005
- Diaphorus longilamellus Harmston, 1971
- Diaphorus longinervis Van Duzee, 1931
- Diaphorus longiseta Wang, Yang & Grootaert, 2006
- Diaphorus longrenensis Liu, Wang & Yang, 2015
- Diaphorus ludibundis Parent, 1932
- Diaphorus luteipes Parent, 1925
- Diaphorus magnipalpis Van Duzee, 1930
- Diaphorus mandarinus Wiedemann, 1830
- Diaphorus maurus Osten Sacken, 1882
- Diaphorus medusae Liu & Yang in Liu, Bian, Zhang & Yang, 2018
- Diaphorus meijeri Parent, 1933
- Diaphorus melanopterus Selivanova & Negrobov, 2009
- Diaphorus menglunanus Yang & Grootaert, 1999
- Diaphorus mengyanganus Yang & Grootaert, 1999
- Diaphorus merlimontensis Parent, 1922
- Diaphorus millardi Meuffels & Grootaert, 1999
- Diaphorus minor De Meijere, 1916
- Diaphorus minos Liu & Yang in Liu, Zhong, Liang & Yang, 2021
- Diaphorus modestus Parent, 1931
- Diaphorus monyx Meuffels & Grootaert, 1985
- Diaphorus morio De Meijere, 1924
- Diaphorus nanpingensis Yang & Saigusa, 2001
- Diaphorus neimengguensis Liu & Yang in Liu, Bian, Zhang & Yang, 2018
- Diaphorus neotropicus Parent, 1928
- Diaphorus niger Vanschuytbroeck, 1951
- Diaphorus nigerrimus De Meijere, 1913
- Diaphorus nigrescens Aldrich, 1901
- Diaphorus nigribarbatus Parent, 1932
- Diaphorus nigricans Meigen, 1824
- Diaphorus nigrihalteralis Van Duzee, 1931
- Diaphorus nigripedus Liu, Wang & Yang, 2015
- Diaphorus nigripennis Van Duzee, 1932
- Diaphorus nigrotibia Strobl, 1893
- Diaphorus nitidulus Parent, 1927
- Diaphorus nudus Van Duzee, 1917
- Diaphorus obscurus Parent, 1933
- Diaphorus ochripes Becker, 1924
- Diaphorus oculatus (Fallén, 1823)
- Diaphorus oldenbergi Parent, 1925
- Diaphorus ozerovi Selivanova, Negrobov & Maslova, 2011
- Diaphorus parapraestans Dyte, 1980
- Diaphorus parenti Stackelberg, 1928
- Diaphorus parmatus Van Duzee, 1915
- Diaphorus parthenus (Hardy & Kohn, 1964)
- Diaphorus pauperculus Parent, 1935
- Diaphorus pilitibius Negrobov & Maslova, 2005
- Diaphorus pilosus Parent, 1932
- Diaphorus plumicornis De Meijere, 1913
- Diaphorus pollinosus De Meijere, 1910
- Diaphorus praeustus Meuffels & Grootaert, 1985
- Diaphorus protervus Becker, 1922
- Diaphorus pruinosus Parent, 1930
- Diaphorus pseudopacus Robinson, 1964
- Diaphorus pulvillatus Meuffels & Grootaert, 1985
- Diaphorus pusio De Meijere, 1916
- Diaphorus putatus Parent, 1925
- Diaphorus qingchengshanus Yang & Grootaert, 1999
- Diaphorus qinlingensis Yang & Saigusa, 2005
- Diaphorus quadridentatus Yang & Saigusa, 2000
- Diaphorus remulus Van Duzee, 1915
- Diaphorus repletus Parent, 1928
- Diaphorus resumens Walker, 1858
- Diaphorus rita Curran, 1926
- Diaphorus robinsoni Runyon, 2020
- Diaphorus rostratus (Bigot, 1890)
- Diaphorus ruiliensis Wang, Yang & Grootaert, 2006
- Diaphorus salticus Yang & Saigusa, 2002
- Diaphorus sanguensis Hollis, 1964
- Diaphorus satellus Becker, 1922
- Diaphorus schoutedeni Curran, 1925
- Diaphorus secundus Becker, 1922
- Diaphorus sequens Becker, 1922
- Diaphorus serenus Becker, 1922
- Diaphorus setifer De Meijere, 1916
- Diaphorus setosus White, 1916
- Diaphorus seyrigi Parent, 1934
- Diaphorus shaanxiensis Liu & Yang in Liu, Bian, Zhang & Yang, 2018
- Diaphorus siamensis Parent, 1935
- Diaphorus similis Van Duzee, 1915
- Diaphorus simulans Becker, 1922
- Diaphorus slossonae Van Duzee, 1932
- Diaphorus snowi Van Duzee, 1917
- Diaphorus sparsus Van Duzee, 1917
- Diaphorus spinitalus Van Duzee, 1923
- Diaphorus stylifer Parent, 1933
- Diaphorus suae Liu & Yang in Liu, Tang, Liang & Yang, 2017
- Diaphorus subjacobsi Negrobov, 2005
- Diaphorus sublautus Negrobov, 2007
- Diaphorus submixtus Becker, 1922
- Diaphorus subsejunctus Loew, 1866
- Diaphorus tadzhikorum Negrobov & Grichanov, 2005
- Diaphorus tangens Parent, 1935
- Diaphorus tenebricoflavus Liu & Yang in Liu, Tang, Liang & Yang, 2017
- Diaphorus tenuipes Parent, 1929
- Diaphorus tetrachaetus Parent, 1933
- Diaphorus texanus Van Duzee, 1932
- Diaphorus translucens De Meijere, 1916
- Diaphorus triangulatus Yang & Saigusa, 2002
- Diaphorus tridentatus Yang & Saigusa, 2000
- Diaphorus tristis (Loew, 1858)
- Diaphorus trivittatus Van Duzee, 1915
- Diaphorus ultimus Becker, 1922
- Diaphorus unguiculatus Parent, 1925
- Diaphorus unicolor Becker, 1922
- Diaphorus ussuriensis Stackelberg, 1928
- Diaphorus vagans Becker, 1922
- Diaphorus varifrons Becker, 1918
- Diaphorus varipes Van Duzee, 1929
- Diaphorus varitibia Parent, 1932
- Diaphorus ventralis Van Duzee, 1915
- Diaphorus versicolor Van Duzee, 1932
- Diaphorus viduus Parent, 1930
- Diaphorus virescens Thomson, 1869
- Diaphorus vitripennis Loew, 1859
- Diaphorus vulsus Van Duzee, 1917
- Diaphorus walkeri Parent, 1934
- Diaphorus winthemi Meigen, 1824
- Diaphorus wonosobensis De Meijere, 1916
- Diaphorus xizangensis Yang & Grootaert, 1999
- Diaphorus zlobini Negrobov & Dukhanina, 1987

Unrecognised species:

- Diaphorus concinnarius (Say, 1829)
- Diaphorus cyanocephalus Meigen, 1824 (= Brachypus coeruleocephalus Megerle (nomen nudum))
- Diaphorus proveniens (Walker, 1859)

The following species are synonyms or have been moved to other genera:

- Diaphorus amicus Parent, 1931: Moved to Chrysotus
- Diaphorus angustifrons Robinson, 1975: Moved to Chrysotus
- Diaphorus bimaculatus Macquart, 1827: synonym of D. oculatus (Fallén, 1823)
- Diaphorus ciliatus Becker, 1922: Moved to Chrysotus
- Diaphorus consimilis Parent, 1937: synonym of D. nigricans Meigen, 1824
- Diaphorus flavipes Aldrich, 1896: moved to Chrysotus
- Diaphorus flavocinctus Meigen, 1824: synonym of D. oculatus (Fallén, 1823)
- Diaphorus hamatus Parent, 1931: Moved to Chrysotus
- Diaphorus inversus Curran, 1924: Synonym of D. dasycnemus Loew, 1858
- Diaphorus latifrons Loew, 1857: Moved to Asyndetus
- Diaphorus leucostoma Loew, 1861: Moved to Chrysotus
- Diaphorus lugubris Loew, 1857: synonym of D. nigricans Meigen, 1824 (?)
- Diaphorus luteipalpus Parent, 1929: Moved to Chrysotus
- Diaphorus maculatus (Parent, 1930): Moved to Chrysotus
- Diaphorus maculipennis Robinson, 1970: Synonym of Chrysotus maculatus (Parent, 1934)
- Diaphorus mediotinctus Becker, 1922: Moved to Chrysotus
- Diaphorus minimus Meigen, 1830: Synonym of Chrysotus gramineus (Fallén, 1823)
- Diaphorus mundus Loew, 1861: Moved to Chrysotus
- Diaphorus munroi Curran, 1926: Moved to Trigonocera
- Diaphorus oblongus Parent, 1928: Moved to Chrysotus
- Diaphorus parvulus Aldrich, 1896: moved to Chrysotus
- Diaphorus propinquus Becker, 1922: Moved to Chrysotus
- Diaphorus robustus Robinson, 1975: Moved to Chrysotus
- Diaphorus rutshuruensis Vanschuytbroeck, 1951: Synonym of D. niger Vanschuytbroeck, 1951
- Diaphorus superbiens Parent, 1931: Synonym of Chrysotus ciliatus (Becker, 1922)
- Diaphorus upembaensis Vanschuytbroeck, 1952: Synonym of D. insufficiens Curran, 1925
- Diaphorus vicinus Becker, 1922: Moved to Chrysotus
- Diaphorus vittatus Van Duzee, 1915: Synonym of Chrysotus leucostoma (Loew, 1861)
- Diaphorus wirthi Robinson, 1975: Moved to Chrysotus
- †Diaphorus tertiarius Meunier, 1907: moved to Palaeomedeterus

The following species were renamed:

- †Dolichopus soccatus Meunier, 1899, nec Walker, 1849: renamed to D. fernandi Meuffels & Grootaert, 1999

The following species are unplaced in the family:

- †Diaphorus venustus (Meunier, 1907)

The following species are considered nomina nuda:

- †Diaphorus modestus Keilbach, 1982 (also preoccupied by D. modestus Parent, 1931)
