= Dubius (fly) =

Scientific classification
- Domain: Eukaryota
- Kingdom: Animalia
- Phylum: Arthropoda
- Class: Insecta
- Order: Diptera
- Family: Dolichopodidae
- Subfamily: Diaphorinae
- Genus: Dubius; Wei, 2012

Type species
- Dubius curtus Wei, 2012

Genus of flies

Dubius is a genus of flies in the family Dolichopodidae, with seven species distributed in southern China and another five in the Neotropical realm. The genus name is from the Latin word dubius, referring to the variance of frons. The genus was first established by Wei Lian-Meng in 2012, including a group of species from the Neotropical realm previously placed in Chrysotus, as well as five newly described species from China. According to some researchers, all of the Neotropical species should be kept in Chrysotus, as their transfer to Dubius was unwarranted.

== Species ==
Chinese species:

- Dubius autumnalus Wei, 2012
- Dubius curtus Wei, 2012
- Dubius flavipedus Liu, Wang & Yang, 2015
- Dubius frontus Wei, 2012
- Dubius hongyaensis Wei, 2012
- Dubius succurtus Wei, 2012
- Dubius yunnanensis Liu, Wang & Yang, 2015

Neotropical species (now transferred back to Chrysotus):

- Dubius angustifrons (Robinson, 1975)
- Dubius maculatus (Parent, 1934)
- Dubius robustus (Robinson, 1975)
- Dubius spectabilis (Loew, 1861)
- Dubius wirthi (Robinson, 1975)
