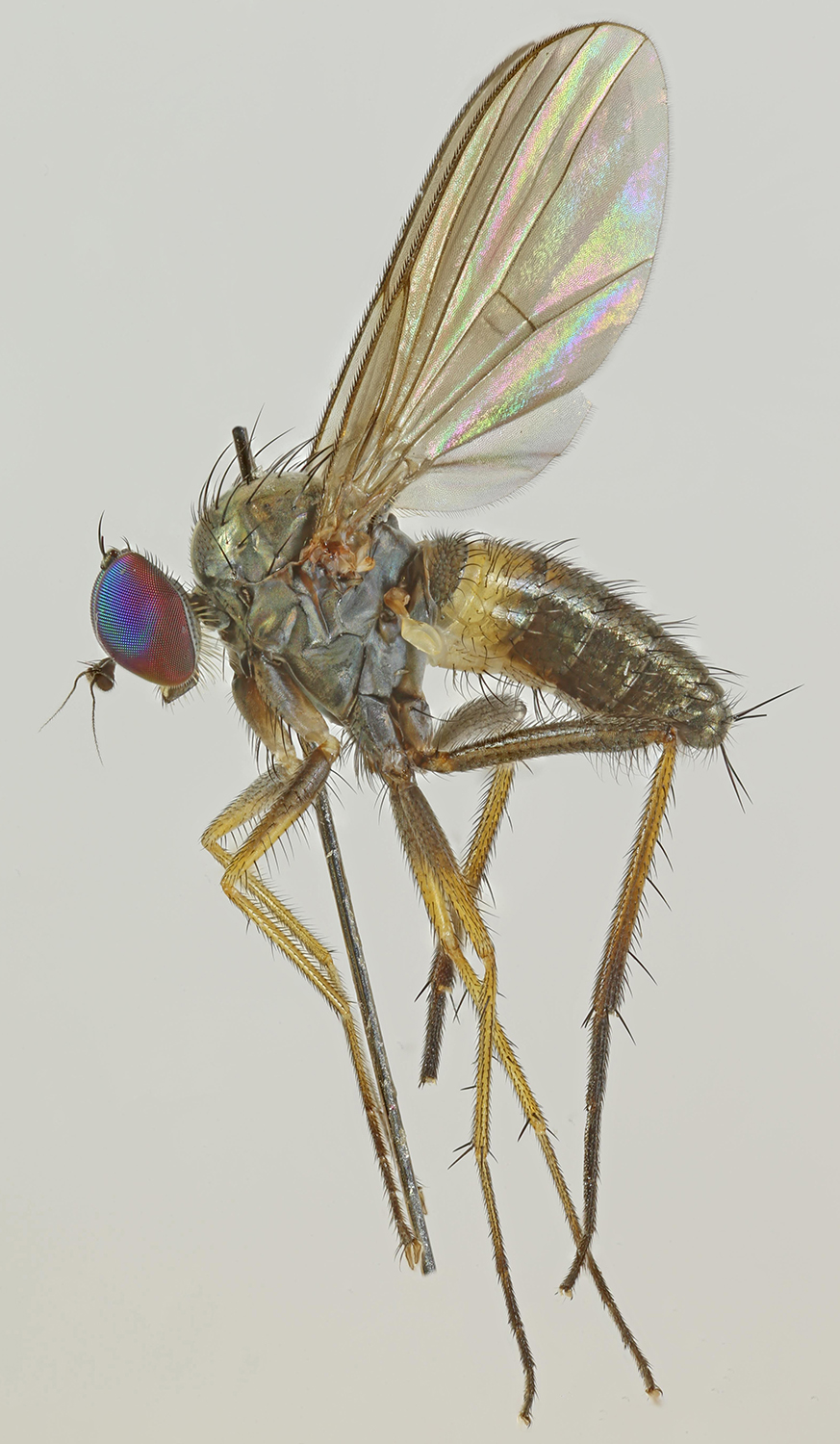
- Diaphorus oculatus North Wales

Scientific classification
- Kingdom: Animalia
- Phylum: Arthropoda
- Class: Insecta
- Order: Diptera
- Family: Dolichopodidae
- Subfamily: Diaphorinae
- Tribe: Diaphorini
- Genus: Diaphorus
- Species: D. oculatus

Binomial name
- Diaphorus oculatus (Fallén, 1823)

Synonyms
- Diaphorus bimaculatus Macquart, 1827; Diaphorus flavocinctus Meigen, 1824; Diaphorus hoffmannseggi Macquart, 1834 (nec Meigen, 1830); Diaphorus tuberculatus (Meigen, 1824)

= Diaphorus oculatus =

Species of fly

Diaphorus oculatus is a species of fly in the family Dolichopodidae. It is found in the Palearctic.
