= Diaphorus nigricans =

Scientific classification
- Kingdom: Animalia
- Phylum: Arthropoda
- Class: Insecta
- Order: Diptera
- Family: Dolichopodidae
- Subfamily: Diaphorinae
- Tribe: Diaphorini
- Genus: Diaphorus
- Species: D. nigricans

Binomial name
- Diaphorus nigricans Meigen, 1824

Synonyms
- Diaphorus consimilis Parent, 1937; ?Diaphorus lugubris Loew, 1857; Diaphorus obscurellus Zetterstedt, 1838; Diaphorus opacus Loew, 1861; Diaphorus sokolovi Stackelberg, 1928

Species of fly

Diaphorus nigricans is a species of long-legged fly in the family Dolichopodidae. It is found in the Holarctic realm, south to the Neotropics.
