= Chrysotus tarsalis =

Scientific classification
- Kingdom: Animalia
- Phylum: Arthropoda
- Class: Insecta
- Order: Diptera
- Family: Dolichopodidae
- Genus: Chrysotus
- Species: C. tarsalis

Binomial name
- Chrysotus tarsalis Van Duzee, 1924

Species of fly

Chrysotus tarsalis is a species of long-legged fly in the family Dolichopodidae.
