= Chrysotus longipalpus =

Scientific classification
- Kingdom: Animalia
- Phylum: Arthropoda
- Clade: Pancrustacea
- Class: Insecta
- Order: Diptera
- Family: Dolichopodidae
- Genus: Chrysotus
- Species: C. longipalpus

Binomial name
- Chrysotus longipalpus Aldrich, 1896

Synonyms
- Chrysotus elegans Parent, 1937 (nec Meigen, 1830); Chrysotus pallidipalpus Van Duzee, 1933; Chrysotus sagittarius Van Duzee, 1924; Chrysotus vulgaris Van Duzee, 1933 (nec Van Duzee, 1924)

Species of fly

Chrysotus longipalpus is a species of fly in the family Dolichopodidae. It is distributed worldwide, though it is an introduced species in much of its range. It is associated with greenhouses.
