= Prochrysotus =

Prochrysotus Temporal range: Eocene (Priabonian), 37.2–33.9 Ma

Scientific classification
- Kingdom: Animalia
- Phylum: Arthropoda
- Class: Insecta
- Order: Diptera
- Family: Dolichopodidae
- Subfamily: Diaphorinae
- Genus: †Prochrysotus; Meunier, 1907
- Species: †P. magnus

Binomial name
- †Prochrysotus magnus Meunier, 1907

Extinct genus of flies

Prochrysotus is an extinct genus of fly in the family Dolichopodidae, known from the Eocene of the Baltic region. It contains only one species, Prochrysotus magnus.
