= Chrysotus costalis =

Scientific classification
- Domain: Eukaryota
- Kingdom: Animalia
- Phylum: Arthropoda
- Class: Insecta
- Order: Diptera
- Family: Dolichopodidae
- Genus: Chrysotus
- Species: C. costalis

Binomial name
- Chrysotus costalis Loew, 1861

Species of fly

Chrysotus costalis is a species of long-legged fly in the family Dolichopodidae.
