= Terpsimyia =

Scientific classification
- Kingdom: Animalia
- Phylum: Arthropoda
- Class: Insecta
- Order: Diptera
- Family: Dolichopodidae
- Subfamily: Diaphorinae
- Genus: Terpsimyia; Dyte, 1975
- Species: T. semicincta

Binomial name
- Terpsimyia semicincta (Becker, 1922)

Synonyms
- Genus: Hadroscelus Becker, 1922 (nec Quendenfeldt, 1885); Species: Hadroscelus semicinctus Becker, 1922

Genus of flies

Terpsimyia is a genus of fly in the family Dolichopodidae. It is known from the Indomalayan realm, and contains only one species, Terpsimyia semicincta, known from Taiwan and Thailand.

The genus was originally named Hadroscelus by Theodor Becker in 1922. However, this name was preoccupied by Hadroscelus Quendenfeldt, 1885, so the genus was renamed to Terpsimyia by Peter Dyte in 1975.
