= Melanostolus =

Scientific classification
- Kingdom: Animalia
- Phylum: Arthropoda
- Class: Insecta
- Order: Diptera
- Family: Dolichopodidae
- Subfamily: Diaphorinae
- Tribe: Diaphorini
- Genus: Melanostolus; Kowarz, 1884

Type species
- Diaphorus melancholicus Loew, 1869

Genus of flies

Melanostolus is a genus of flies in the family Dolichopodidae. It includes six species, which are distributed in Europe and Asia.

== Species ==
- Melanostolus kolomiezi Negrobov, 1984 – China (Tibet)
- Melanostolus longipilosus Negrobov, 1984 – Mongolia, Russia (Altai Republic)
- Melanostolus melancholicus (Loew, 1869) – Belgium, Czech Republic, Estonia, Finland, France, Hungary, Ireland, Lithuania, Netherlands, Romania, Russia (Krasnodar, Leningrad), Serbia, Sweden, UK, ?Kenya
- Melanostolus negrobovi Olejníček & Barták, 1999 – Uzbekistan
- Melanostolus nigricilius (Loew, 1871) – Bulgaria, China, France, Germany, Hungary, Israel, Mongolia, Romania, Russia (Yakutia), Tajikistan, ?Kenya
- Melanostolus tatianae Negrobov, 1965 – Russia (Krasnodar)
