= Chrysotus arkansensis =

Scientific classification
- Kingdom: Animalia
- Phylum: Arthropoda
- Class: Insecta
- Order: Diptera
- Family: Dolichopodidae
- Genus: Chrysotus
- Species: C. arkansensis

Binomial name
- Chrysotus arkansensis Van Duzee, 1930

Species of fly

Chrysotus arkansensis is a species of long-legged fly in the family Dolichopodidae. It was described from six specimens, which were collected from Fayetteville, Arkansas in 1906.
