= Nurteria =

Scientific classification
- Kingdom: Animalia
- Phylum: Arthropoda
- Clade: Pancrustacea
- Class: Insecta
- Order: Diptera
- Family: Dolichopodidae
- Subfamily: Sympycninae
- Genus: Nurteria; Dyte & Smith, 1980

Type species
- Turneria depressa Parent, 1935

Synonyms
- Turneria Parent, 1934 (nomen nudum); Turneria Parent, 1935 (nec Forel, 1885)

Genus of flies

Nurteria is a genus of flies in the family Dolichopodidae, found in the Afrotropical realm. Three species are currently known in the genus, but there are also numerous undescribed species of the genus from southern Africa. It was originally described in the subfamily Diaphorinae, though it possesses some features of the Sympycninae.

The genus was originally described by Octave Parent in 1934 with the name Turneria, including two species. A third species was described by Parent in 1935. Dyte & Smith (1980) found that the name of the genus was preoccupied by the ant genus Turneria, and so they renamed it to Nurteria, designating one of Parent's originally included species as the type. According to Neal Evenhuis in 2008, the original use of the name Turneria by Parent (1934) is a nomen nudum, because no type species was designated for the genus. The name later became available in Parent (1935), where the only species included becomes the type species by monotypy.

== Species ==
The genus includes three species:

- Nurteria bicolor (Parent, 1934) – South Africa
- Nurteria capensis (Parent, 1934) – South Africa
- Nurteria depressa (Parent, 1935) – DR Congo
