= Nurteria bicolor =

Scientific classification
- Kingdom: Animalia
- Phylum: Arthropoda
- Clade: Pancrustacea
- Class: Insecta
- Order: Diptera
- Family: Dolichopodidae
- Subfamily: Sympycninae
- Genus: Nurteria
- Species: N. bicolor

Binomial name
- Nurteria bicolor (Parent, 1934)

Species of fly

Nurteria bicolor is a species of fly from South Africa, first described by Octave Parent in 1934. It belongs to the genus Nurteria and the family Dolichopodidae.
