= Emiratomyia =

Scientific classification
- Kingdom: Animalia
- Phylum: Arthropoda
- Class: Insecta
- Order: Diptera
- Family: Dolichopodidae
- Subfamily: Diaphorinae
- Genus: Emiratomyia; Naglis, 2014
- Species: E. arabica

Binomial name
- Emiratomyia arabica Naglis, 2014

Genus of flies

Emiratomyia is a genus of flies in the family Dolichopodidae from the United Arab Emirates. It contains only one species, Emiratomyia arabica. The generic name refers to the country where E. arabica was collected, the United Arab Emirates. The specific name refers to the geographic region where the species was collected, the Arabian Peninsula.
