= Chrysotus choricus =

Scientific classification
- Domain: Eukaryota
- Kingdom: Animalia
- Phylum: Arthropoda
- Class: Insecta
- Order: Diptera
- Family: Dolichopodidae
- Genus: Chrysotus
- Species: C. choricus

Binomial name
- Chrysotus choricus Wheeler, 1890

Synonyms
- Chrysotus ciliatus Malloch, 1914

Species of fly

Chrysotus choricus is a species of long-legged fly in the family Dolichopodidae.
