= Pseudargyra =

Scientific classification
- Kingdom: Animalia
- Phylum: Arthropoda
- Clade: Pancrustacea
- Class: Insecta
- Order: Diptera
- Family: Dolichopodidae
- Subfamily: Diaphorinae
- Tribe: Argyrini
- Genus: Pseudargyra; Van Duzee, 1930

Type species
- Pseudargyra cornuta Van Duzee, 1930

Genus of flies

Pseudargyra is a genus of flies in the family Dolichopodidae. It includes four species endemic to Chile.

== Species ==
- Pseudargyra cornuta Van Duzee, 1930
- Pseudargyra fuscipennis Van Duzee, 1930
- Pseudargyra magnicornis (Van Duzee, 1930)
- Pseudargyra tarsalis (Van Duzee, 1930)
