= Chrysotus pallipes =

Scientific classification
- Domain: Eukaryota
- Kingdom: Animalia
- Phylum: Arthropoda
- Class: Insecta
- Order: Diptera
- Family: Dolichopodidae
- Genus: Chrysotus
- Species: C. pallipes

Binomial name
- Chrysotus pallipes Loew, 1861

Species of fly

Chrysotus pallipes is a species in the family Dolichopodidae ("longlegged flies"), in the order Diptera ("flies").
