= Chrysotus subcostatus =

Scientific classification
- Domain: Eukaryota
- Kingdom: Animalia
- Phylum: Arthropoda
- Class: Insecta
- Order: Diptera
- Family: Dolichopodidae
- Genus: Chrysotus
- Species: C. subcostatus

Binomial name
- Chrysotus subcostatus Loew, 1864

Synonyms
- Chrysotus pratincola Wheeler, 1890

Species of fly

Chrysotus subcostatus is a species of long-legged fly in the family Dolichopodidae.
