= Trigonocera =

Scientific classification
- Kingdom: Animalia
- Phylum: Arthropoda
- Clade: Pancrustacea
- Class: Insecta
- Order: Diptera
- Family: Dolichopodidae
- Subfamily: Diaphorinae
- Genus: Trigonocera; Becker, 1902

Type species
- Trigonocera rivosa Becker, 1902

Genus of flies

Trigonocera is a genus of flies in the family Dolichopodidae. It is known from the Afrotropical, Oriental and Palaearctic realms.

== Species ==
- Trigonocera ethiopiensis Grichanov, 2013 – Ethiopia
- Trigonocera guizhouensis Wang, Yang & Grootaert, 2008 – China (Chongqing, Guizhou, Xizang, Yunnan)
- Trigonocera lucidiventris Becker, 1922 – Taiwan, Laos, Thailand
- Trigonocera madagascarensis Grichanov, 2013 – Madagascar
- Trigonocera munroi (Curran, 1926) – DR Congo, Ethiopia, Kenya, Namibia, South Africa, Eswatini
- Trigonocera obscura De Meijere, 1916 – Indonesia, Myanmar
- Trigonocera rivosa Becker, 1902 (Synonym: T. africana Naglis, 1999) – Egypt, Israel, Botswana, Cape Verde, Namibia, Senegal, Zambia, Taiwan, Thailand
- Trigonocera shuensis Liu & Yang in Liu, Wang, Tang & Yang, 2018 – China (Chongqing, Sichuan)
- Trigonocera specialis Becker, 1922 – Nepal, India (West Bengal)
- Trigonocera tongshiensis (Yang, 2002) – China (Hainan)

T. biseta Olejníček, 2004 has been moved to Chrysotus.
