= Chrysotus cornutus =

Scientific classification
- Domain: Eukaryota
- Kingdom: Animalia
- Phylum: Arthropoda
- Class: Insecta
- Order: Diptera
- Family: Dolichopodidae
- Genus: Chrysotus
- Species: C. cornutus

Binomial name
- Chrysotus cornutus Loew, 1862

Species of fly

Chrysotus cornutus is a species of long-legged fly in the family Dolichopodidae.
