= Somillus =

Scientific classification
- Kingdom: Animalia
- Phylum: Arthropoda
- Clade: Pancrustacea
- Class: Insecta
- Order: Diptera
- Family: Dolichopodidae
- Subfamily: Diaphorinae
- Tribe: Argyrini
- Genus: Somillus; Brèthes, 1924

Type species
- Somillus melanosoma Brèthes, 1924

Synonyms
- Ionthadophrys Van Duzee, 1930

Genus of flies

Somillus is a genus of flies in the family Dolichopodidae. It includes two species endemic to Chile.

== Species ==
- Somillus longihirtus (Van Duzee, 1930)
- Somillus melanosoma Brèthes, 1924
