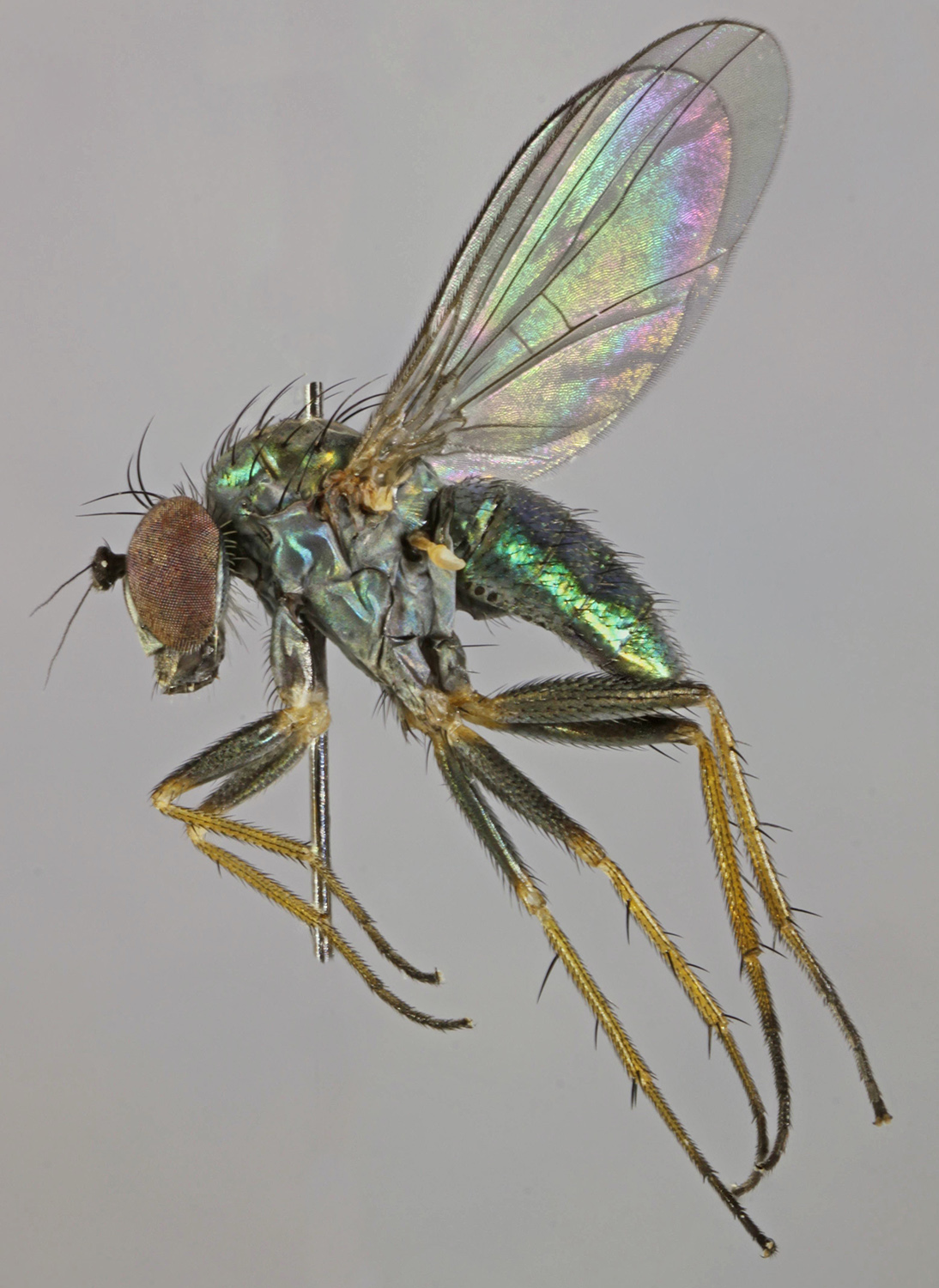
- Chrysotus neglectus North Wales

Scientific classification
- Kingdom: Animalia
- Phylum: Arthropoda
- Class: Insecta
- Order: Diptera
- Family: Dolichopodidae
- Genus: Chrysotus
- Species: C. neglectus

Binomial name
- Chrysotus neglectus (Wiedemann, 1817)

Synonyms
- Chrysotus copiosus Meigen, 1824; Chrysotus femoralis Meigen, 1824; Chrysotus lundbladi Frey, 1939; Chrysotus taeniomerus Meigen, 1830; Chrysotus viridulus (Fallén, 1823); Dolichopus neglectus Wiedemann, 1817; Dolichopus viridulus Fallén, 1823

= Chrysotus neglectus =

Species of fly

Chrysotus neglectus is a species of fly in the family Dolichopodidae. It is found in the Palearctic.
