= Symbolia =

Scientific classification
- Kingdom: Animalia
- Phylum: Arthropoda
- Clade: Pancrustacea
- Class: Insecta
- Order: Diptera
- Family: Dolichopodidae
- Subfamily: Diaphorinae
- Tribe: Argyrini
- Genus: Symbolia; Becker, 1922

Type species
- Symbolia ochracea Becker, 1922

Synonyms
- Cyrtosymbolia Parent, 1931

Genus of flies

Symbolia is a genus of flies in the family Dolichopodidae. It is distributed in the Neotropical realm.

== Species ==
- Symbolia aldrichi Robinson, 1966 – Mexico
- Symbolia costaricensis Robinson, 1966 – Costa Rica
- Symbolia hirticauda Robinson, 1966 – Costa Rica
- Symbolia latifacies Robinson, 1966 – Peru
- Symbolia linearis (Aldrich, 1896) – Lesser Antilles
- Symbolia loewi (Aldrich, 1901) – Mexico
- Symbolia longihirta (Van Duzee, 1930) – Peru
- Symbolia lugubris Parent, 1934 – Colombia
- Symbolia maculata Robinson, 1966 – Peru
- Symbolia mexicana Robinson, 1966 – Mexico
- Symbolia nigripennis (Van Duzee, 1931) – Panama
- Symbolia ochracea Becker, 1922 – Bolivia
- Symbolia schildi Robinson, 1966 – Costa Rica
- Symbolia setifera Robinson, 1966 – Mexico
- Symbolia sinuata (Aldrich, 1896) – Saint Vincent, Grenada
- Symbolia sinuosa (Parent, 1931) – Peru
