= Phasmaphleps =

Scientific classification
- Kingdom: Animalia
- Phylum: Arthropoda
- Clade: Pancrustacea
- Class: Insecta
- Order: Diptera
- Family: Dolichopodidae
- Subfamily: Diaphorinae
- Genus: Phasmaphleps; Bickel, 2005
- Species: P. pacifica

Binomial name
- Phasmaphleps pacifica Bickel, 2005

Genus of flies

Phasmaphleps is a genus of flies in the family Dolichopodidae from the western Pacific. It contains only one species, Phasmaphleps pacifica, which occurs in the Samoan Islands, Tonga, Fiji, Solomon Islands, Tuvalu and Palau. Adults of this species reach a length of 1.3–1.4 mm (0.051–0.055 in) and have wings measuring 1.5 mm × 0.6 mm (0.059 in × 0.024 in) on average. It inhabits littoral and mangrove regions.

== Taxonomy ==
Phasmaphleps pacifica was formally described in 2005 by the entomologist Daniel Bickel based on a holotype male collected from the island of Vanua Levu in Fiji. The generic name is derived from the Greek words phasma ("ghost" or "phantom") and phleps ("tube" or "vein"), referring to the absence of vein M just beyond the dm-cu crossvein in the fly's wings. The specific epithet refers to the species' wide distribution on islands in the Pacific Ocean.

== Description ==
Adults of this species reach a length of 1.3–1.4 mm (0.051–0.055 in) and have wings measuring 1.5 mm × 0.6 mm (0.059 in × 0.024 in) on average. The cuticle of the body is dully metallic, lacking a frosted appearance. The frons is glossy black with grey frosting, while the face is pale black. The antenna is also black, while the proboscis is yellow. The postcranium is metallic blue-green. The thorax is dark metallic green with black setae, with dull yellow legs that lack hairs. The long abdomen is covered by short black hairs. Females have a band of band of cuticle between their eyes and uniform facets. The vein M on the wing is virtually absent past the dm-cu crossvein.

== Distribution and habitat ==
Phasmaphleps pacifica is widely distributed across the western Pacific Ocean and has so far been recorded from Samoa, Tonga, Fiji, Palau, Tuvalu, and the Solomon Islands. It is a species of lowlands and seems to prefer littoral and mangrove regions. The type specimens of the fly were found in "salty slough, black mud with rocks and numerous fiddler crabs".
