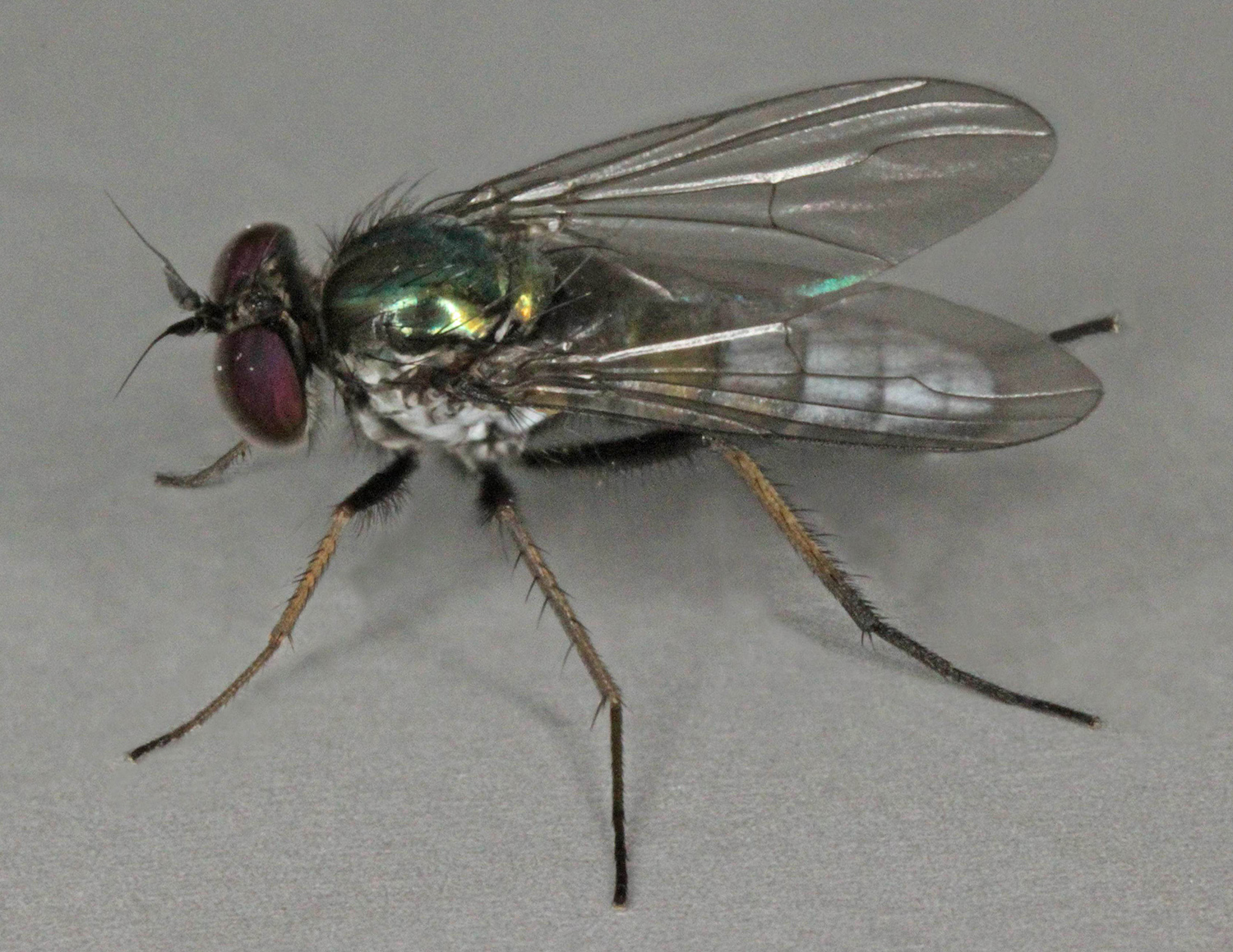
- Argyra diaphana

Scientific classification
- Kingdom: Animalia
- Phylum: Arthropoda
- Clade: Pancrustacea
- Class: Insecta
- Order: Diptera
- Family: Dolichopodidae
- Subfamily: Diaphorinae; Schiner, 1864

Genera
- see text

= Diaphorinae =

Subfamily of flies

Diaphorinae is a subfamily of flies in the family Dolichopodidae. It is one of the most diverse subfamilies, but its boundaries are not precisely defined, and a number of genera included within it by some researchers have been referred to other subfamilies such as Rhaphiinae and Sympycninae by others.

== Genera ==
- Nematoproctus Loew, 1857 (Diaphorinae or Rhaphiinae)
- Nurteria Dyte & Smith, 1980 (may belong in Sympycninae)
- †Palaeoargyra Meunier, 1895
- Phasmaphleps Bickel, 2005
- †Prochrysotus Meunier, 1907
- Terpsimyia Dyte, 1975
- Urodolichus Lamb, 1922 (Diaphorinae or Rhaphiinae)
- Tribe Diaphorini Schiner, 1864
  - Achradocera Becker, 1922
  - Aphasmaphleps Grichanov, 2010
  - Asyndetus Loew, 1869
  - Chrysotus Meigen, 1824
  - Cryptophleps Lichtwardt, 1898
  - Diaphorus Meigen, 1824
  - Dubius Wei, 2012
  - Emiratomyia Naglis, 2014
  - Falbouria Dyte, 1980
  - Lyroneurus Loew, 1857
  - Melanostolus Kowarz, 1884
  - Ostenia Hutton, 1901
  - Shamshevia Grichanov, 2012
  - Trigonocera Becker, 1902
- Tribe Argyrini Negrobov, 1986
  - Argyra Macquart, 1834
  - Dactylonotus Parent, 1934
  - Keirosoma Van Duzee, 1929
  - Pseudargyra Van Duzee, 1930
  - Somillus Brèthes, 1924
  - Symbolia Becker, 1922
