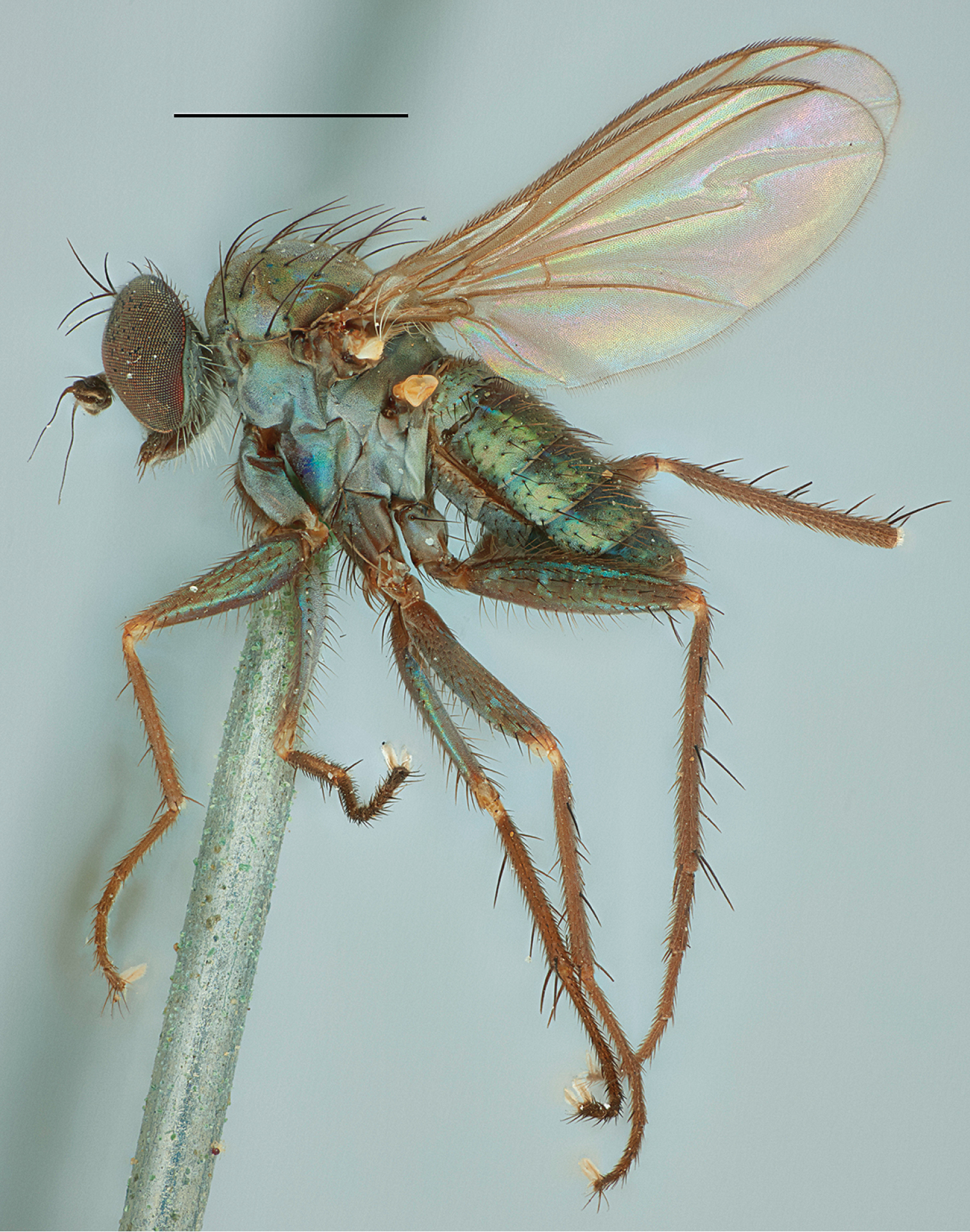
- Asyndetus fratellus

Scientific classification
- Domain: Eukaryota
- Kingdom: Animalia
- Phylum: Arthropoda
- Class: Insecta
- Order: Diptera
- Family: Dolichopodidae
- Subfamily: Diaphorinae
- Tribe: Diaphorini
- Genus: Asyndetus; Loew, 1869

Type species
- Asyndetus ammophilus Loew, 1869

Synonyms
- Anchineura Thomson, 1869 (nomen oblitum); Meringopherusa Becker, 1902

= Asyndetus =

Genus of flies

Asyndetus is a genus of flies in the family Dolichopodidae. There are more than 100 species described for the genus, distributed worldwide.

== Species ==
- Asyndetus aciliatus Grootaert & Meuffels, 2003
- Asyndetus acuticornis (De Meijere, 1913)
- Asyndetus albifacies Parent, 1929
- Asyndetus albifrons Parent, 1929
- Asyndetus albipalpus Loew, 1871
- Asyndetus alborzensis Grichanov & Gilasian, 2023
- Asyndetus amaphinius Séguy, 1950
- Asyndetus ammophilus Loew, 1869
- Asyndetus anticus Negrobov, 1973
- Asyndetus appendiculatus Loew, 1869
- Asyndetus archboldi Robinson & Deyrup, 1997
- Asyndetus aurocupreus Strobl, 1909
- Asyndetus barbiventris Stackelberg, 1952
- Asyndetus beijingensis Zhang & Yang, 2003
- Asyndetus brevimanus Van Duzee, 1923
- Asyndetus brunnicosus Becker, 1922
- Asyndetus bursericola Bickel & Sinclair, 1997
- Asyndetus bykovskyi Negrobov, Maslova & Selivanova, 2019
- Asyndetus calcaratus Becker, 1922
- Asyndetus carcinophilus Parent, 1937
- Asyndetus caudatus Van Duzee, 1916
- Asyndetus cavagnaroi Bickel & Sinclair, 1997
- Asyndetus chaetifemoratus Parent, 1925
- Asyndetus ciliatus Grootaert & Meuffels, 2003
- Asyndetus clavipes Liu, Wang & Yang in Liu, Zhang, Wang & Yang, 2016
- Asyndetus congensis Grichanov, 2013
- Asyndetus connexus (Becker, 1902)
- Asyndetus cornutus Van Duzee, 1916
- Asyndetus crassipodus Harmston, 1968
- Asyndetus crassitarsis Curran, 1926
- Asyndetus currani Van Duzee, 1931
- Asyndetus decaryi Parent, 1929
- Asyndetus deficiens Robinson, 1975
- Asyndetus diaphoriformis Negrobov & Shamshev, 1986
- Asyndetus disjunctus Van Duzee, 1923
- Asyndetus dominicensis Robinson, 1975
- Asyndetus dubius Parent, 1925
- Asyndetus eurytarsus Meuffels & Grootaert, 1993
- Asyndetus exactus (Walker, 1859)
- Asyndetus exiguus Van Duzee, 1927
- Asyndetus exunguis Parent, 1927
- Asyndetus fallahzadehi Grichanov in Grichanov & Rezaei, 2019
- Asyndetus flavipalpus Van Duzee, 1932
- Asyndetus flavitibialis Van Duzee, 1929
- Asyndetus fractus De Meijere, 1913
- Asyndetus fratellus Aldrich, 1896
- Asyndetus geminus Becker, 1922
- Asyndetus guangxiensis Zhang & Yang, 2003
- Asyndetus harbeckii Van Duzee, 1914
- Asyndetus hardyi Robinson, 1964
- Asyndetus indifferens Curran, 1926
- Asyndetus inermis Parent, 1927
- Asyndetus infernus Bickel, 1996
- Asyndetus intermedius Meuffels & Grootaert, 1993
- Asyndetus interruptus (Loew, 1861)
- Asyndetus johnsoni Van Duzee, 1916
- Asyndetus karkhehensis Grichanov & Gilasian, 2023
- Asyndetus latifrons (Loew, 1857)
- Asyndetus latisurstylus Liu, Wang & Yang in Liu, Zhang, Wang & Yang, 2016
- Asyndetus latitarsatus Becker, 1922
- Asyndetus latus Van Duzee, 1916
- Asyndetus lichtwardti Kertész, 1901
- Asyndetus lii Wang & Yang, 2005
- Asyndetus lineatus De Meijere, 1916
- Asyndetus longicornis Negrobov, 1973
- Asyndetus longipalpis Van Duzee, 1919
- Asyndetus madagascarensis Grichanov, 2013
- Asyndetus maelfaiti Bickel & Sinclair, 1997
- Asyndetus melanopselaphus Stackelberg, 1952
- Asyndetus mixtus Negrobov & Shamshev, 1986
- Asyndetus mutatus Becker, 1922
- Asyndetus mystacinus Bickel & Sinclair, 1997
- Asyndetus namibiensis Grichanov, 2013
- Asyndetus negrobovi Parvu, 1989
- Asyndetus nevadensis Harmston, 1968
- Asyndetus nigripes Van Duzee, 1916
- Asyndetus obscurus Meuffels & Grootaert, 1993
- Asyndetus occidentalis Van Duzee, 1919
- Asyndetus oregonensis Harmston, 1966
- Asyndetus parvicornis Van Duzee, 1932
- Asyndetus perpulvillatus Parent, 1926
- Asyndetus persicus Grichanov & Gilasian, 2023
- Asyndetus pogonops Robinson, 1975
- Asyndetus porrectus Parent, 1939
- Asyndetus pseudoseparatus Grichanov, 2013
- Asyndetus savannensis Grichanov, 2013
- Asyndetus scopifer Harmston, 1952
- Asyndetus secundus Bickel, 1996
- Asyndetus semarangensis Dyte, 1975
- Asyndetus separatus (Becker, 1902)
- Asyndetus severini Harmston & Knowlton, 1939
- Asyndetus singularis Van Duzee, 1923
- Asyndetus spinitarsis Harmston, 1951
- Asyndetus spinosus Van Duzee, 1925
- Asyndetus syntormoides Wheeler, 1899
- Asyndetus terminalis Van Duzee, 1923
- Asyndetus texanus Van Duzee, 1916
- Asyndetus thaicus Grootaert & Meuffels, 2003
- Asyndetus tibialis (Thomson, 1869)
- Asyndetus transversalis Becker, 1907
- Asyndetus tristis Parent, 1935
- Asyndetus utahensis Harmston & Knowlton, 1942
- Asyndetus varus Loew, 1869
- Asyndetus ventralis Wang, Yang & Masunaga, 2007
- Asyndetus versicolor Johnson, 1924
- Asyndetus vicinus Meuffels & Grootaert, 1993
- Asyndetus virgatus Curran, 1926
- Asyndetus wigginsi Bickel & Sinclair, 1997
- Asyndetus wusuensis Wang & Yang, 2005
- Asyndetus xinjiangensis Wang & Yang, 2005

The following species are considered synonyms of other species:

- Asyndetus bredini Robinson, 1975: synonym of Asyndetus interruptus (Loew, 1861)
- Asyndetus lateinterruptus Strobl, 1909: synonym of Asyndetus separatus (Becker, 1902)
- Asyndetus nigripalpis (De Meijere, 1913): synonym of Asyndetus exactus (Walker, 1859)
- Asyndetus ridiculus Parent, 1931: synonym of Asyndetus tibialis (Thomson, 1869)
- Asyndetus wirthi Robinson, 1997: synonym of Asyndetus interruptus (Loew, 1861)

The following species were renamed:

- Asyndetus tibialis De Meijere, 1916 (preoccupied by Asyndetus tibialis (Thomson, 1869)): renamed to Asyndetus semarangensis Dyte, 1975

The following species were moved to another genus:

- Asyndetus izius Negrobov, 1973: moved to Cryptophleps
- Asyndetus minutus Negrobov & Shamshev, 1986: moved to Cryptophleps
- Asyndetus vividus Negrobov & Shamshev, 1986: moved to Cryptophleps
