= Cryptophleps =

Scientific classification
- Kingdom: Animalia
- Phylum: Arthropoda
- Clade: Pancrustacea
- Class: Insecta
- Order: Diptera
- Family: Dolichopodidae
- Subfamily: Diaphorinae
- Genus: Cryptophleps; Lichtwardt, 1898

Type species
- Cryptophleps kerteszi Lichtwardt, 1898

Genus of flies

Cryptophleps is a genus of flies in the family Dolichopodidae.

== Species ==
- Cryptophleps atollensis Bickel, 1996 – Micronesia
- Cryptophleps buala Bickel, 2006 – Solomon Islands
- Cryptophleps bucculenta Bickel, 2006 – Samoa
- Cryptophleps buttikeri Grichanov, 2015 – Saudi Arabia
- Cryptophleps cyplus Bickel, 1996 – Australia
- Cryptophleps inornata Bickel, 1996 – Australia
- Cryptophleps izia (Negrobov, 1973) – Central Asia
- Cryptophleps karkar Bickel, 2006 – Papua New Guinea
- Cryptophleps kerteszi Lichtwardt, 1898 – Europe, China
- Cryptophleps minuta (Negrobov & Shamshev, 1986) – Far Eastern Asia
- Cryptophleps namibica Grichanov, 2015 – Namibia
- Cryptophleps nigrihalterata Lamb, 1922 – Seychelles
- Cryptophleps nova Bickel, 1996 – Australia
- Cryptophleps ochrihalterata Lamb, 1922 – Seychelles
- Cryptophleps papuana Grootaert & Meuffels, 1987 – Papua New Guinea, Solomon Islands
- Cryptophleps rivularis Bickel, 2006 – New Caledonia
- Cryptophleps rothii Couturier, 1978 – Ivory Coast
- Cryptophleps samoensis Bickel, 2006 – American Samoa, Samoa
- Cryptophleps solomonis Bickel, 1996 – Solomon Islands
- Cryptophleps vaea Bickel, 2006 – Samoa
- Cryptophleps vitiensis Bickel, 2006 – Fiji
- Cryptophleps vivida (Negrobov & Shamshev, 1986) – Far Eastern Asia
- Cryptophleps yungaburra Bickel, 1996 – Australia
