= Lyroneurus =

Scientific classification
- Kingdom: Animalia
- Phylum: Arthropoda
- Clade: Pancrustacea
- Class: Insecta
- Order: Diptera
- Family: Dolichopodidae
- Subfamily: Diaphorinae
- Genus: Lyroneurus; Loew, 1857

Type species
- Lyroneurus coerulescens Loew, 1857

Genus of flies

Lyroneurus is a genus of flies in the family Dolichopodidae. It includes 17 species distributed in the Neotropical realm. It was formerly treated as a subgenus of Diaphorus; more recently Lyroneurus has been treated as a synonym of Chrysotus, but Capellari & Amorim (2010) maintains it as a distinct genus noting that Chrysotus is possibly paraphyletic.

== Species ==
The species below are named assuming Lyroneurus is treated as a separate genus:

- Lyroneurus adustus (Wiedemann, 1830) – Brazil, Uruguay, Paraguay, Argentina
- Lyroneurus annulatus (Macquart, 1842) – Mexico, Lesser Antilles, Brazil
- Lyroneurus apicalis Becker, 1922 – Argentina, Paraguay
- Lyroneurus chalybaeus Röder, 1892 – Ecuador
- Lyroneurus coerulescens Loew, 1857 – Mexico, Suriname, Ecuador, Argentina
- Lyroneurus curvispina (Van Duzee, 1929) – Guatemala, Panama
- Lyroneurus fratellus Becker, 1922 – Colombia, Argentina
- Lyroneurus laetus Becker, 1922 – Paraguay
- Lyroneurus luteoviridis Parent, 1935 – Colombia
- Lyroneurus maculatus Parent, 1930 – Argentina
- Lyroneurus marginalis Becker, 1922 – Peru, Bolivia
- Lyroneurus occultus Becker, 1922 – Colombia
- Lyroneurus perplexus (Van Duzee, 1929) – Panama
- Lyroneurus praestans Parent, 1931 – Peru
- Lyroneurus simplex Aldrich, 1896 – Lesser Antilles, Mexico, Costa Rica, Peru, Brazil
- Lyroneurus suavis Loew, 1857 – Costa Rica, Panama, Guyana, Suriname, Bolivia, Argentina
- Lyroneurus willistoni (Van Duzee, 1931) – ?Brazil
