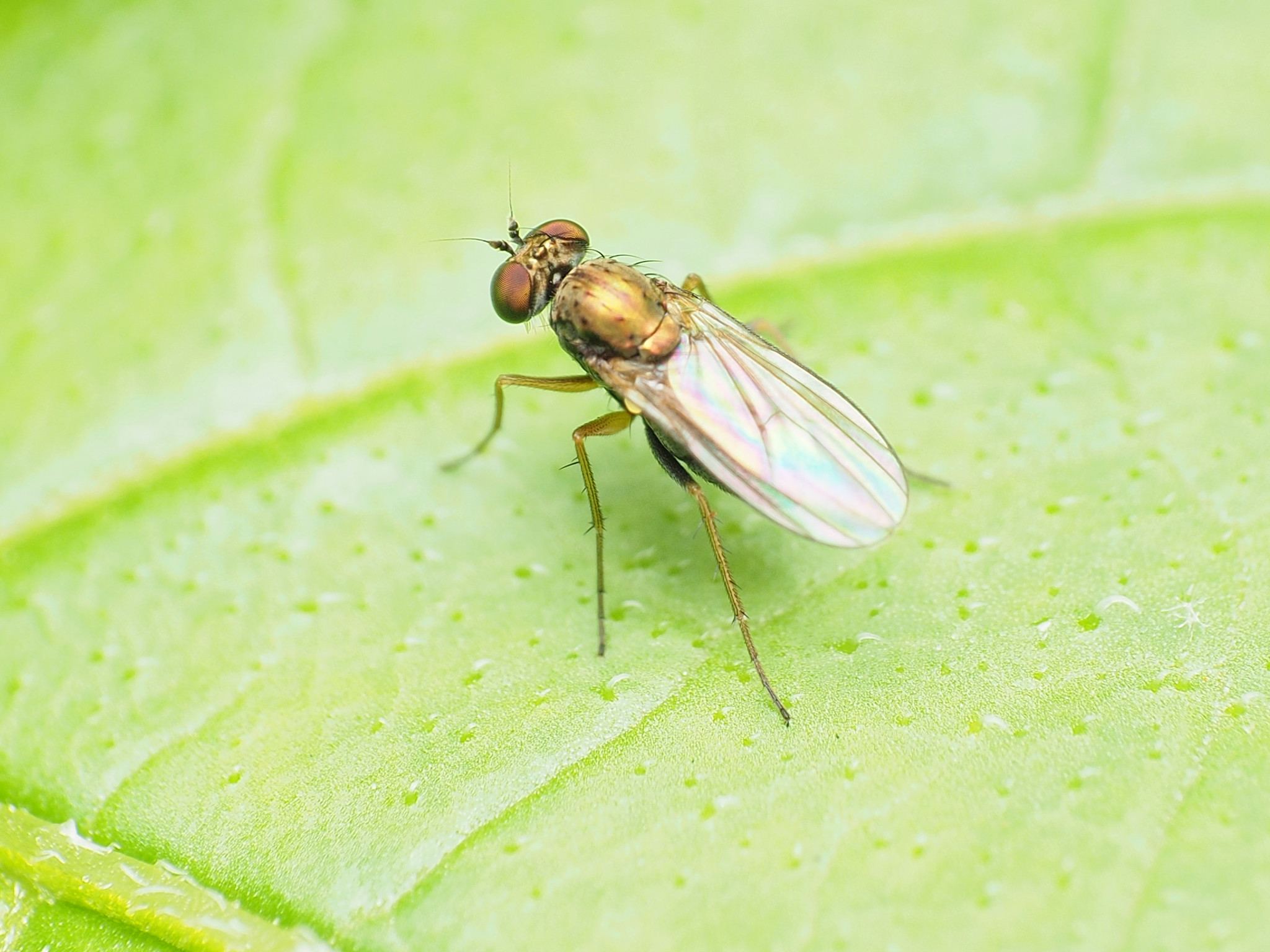
- Achradocera barbata

Scientific classification
- Kingdom: Animalia
- Phylum: Arthropoda
- Clade: Pancrustacea
- Class: Insecta
- Order: Diptera
- Family: Dolichopodidae
- Subfamily: Diaphorinae
- Genus: Achradocera; Becker, 1922

Type species
- Achradocera femoralis Becker, 1922

= Achradocera =

Genus of flies

Achradocera is a genus of flies in the family Dolichopodidae. It is distributed in the Nearctic and Neotropical realms as well as in Polynesia. Several Afrotropical species were also placed in the genus, but in 2018 they were transferred to Chrysotus. Achradocera was formerly considered a subgenus of Chrysotus, but was restored as a separate genus by Harold E. Robinson (1975).

Adult males of Achradocera can be recognised by several secondary sex characteristics: their antennae have the first flagellomere elongated and swollen at the base with a narrow tip, and they have rows of thickened setae underneath the eyes.

== Species ==
- Achradocera apicalis (Aldrich, 1896) – West Indies, Mexico, Ecuador, Chile, French Polynesia, Tonga
- Achradocera arcuata (Van Duzee, 1924) – western United States, Mexico, Hawaii
- Achradocera barbata (Loew, 1861) – North America
- Achradocera chilensis (Van Duzee, 1930) – Chile, Argentina
- Achradocera contracta (Van Duzee, 1929) – Guatemala
- Achradocera edwardsi (Van Duzee, 1930) – Chile
- Achradocera excavata (Van Duzee, 1924) – Virgin Islands
- Achradocera femoralis Becker, 1922 – Paraguay, Trinidad, Colombia
- Achradocera insignis Parent, 1933 – Argentina, Trinidad
- Achradocera longiseta Parent, 1933 – Bolivia, Argentina
- Achradocera meridionalis Becker, 1922 – Costa Rica
- Achradocera shannoni (Van Duzee, 1930) – Costa Rica, Panama, Peru, Hawaii
- Achradocera tuberculata (Van Duzee, 1931) – Bolivia

The following species are synonyms or have been moved to other genera:

- Achradocera africana Parent, 1934: now Chrysotus africanus (Parent, 1934)
- Achradocera angustifacies Becker, 1922: synonym of A. apicalis (Aldrich, 1896)
- Achradocera ealensis Parent, 1936: now Chrysotus ealensis (Parent, 1936)
- Achradocera insularis Lamb, 1933: now Chrysotus insularis (Lamb, 1933)
- Achradocera insularis Parent, 1933 (homonym of above): synonym of Chrysotus insularis (Lamb, 1933)
- Achradocera rutshuruensis Vanschuytbroeck, 1951: now Chrysotus rutshuruensis (Vanschuytbroeck, 1951)
- Achradocera wulfi Parent, 1936: now Chrysotus wulfi (Parent, 1936)
