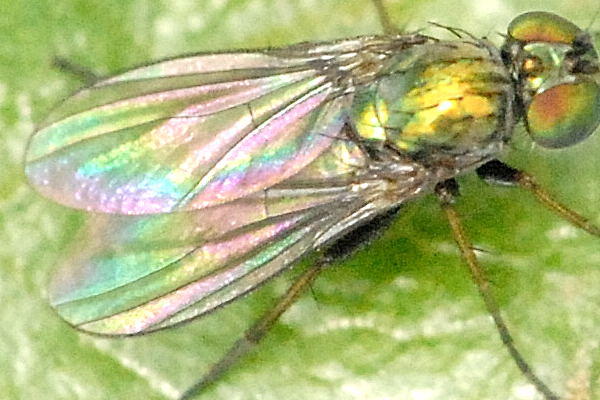
- Chrysotus gramineus

Scientific classification
- Domain: Eukaryota
- Kingdom: Animalia
- Phylum: Arthropoda
- Class: Insecta
- Order: Diptera
- Family: Dolichopodidae
- Subfamily: Diaphorinae
- Tribe: Diaphorini
- Genus: Chrysotus; Meigen, 1824

Type species
- Dolichopus neglectus Wiedemann, 1817

Subgenera
- Angiopus Meuffels & Grootaert, 1996; Chrysotus Meigen, 1824

Synonyms
- Lyroneurus Loew, 1857 (?)

= Chrysotus =

Genus of flies

Chrysotus is a genus of flies in the family Dolichopodidae. It is one of the largest genera in the subfamily Diaphorinae, with more than 460 species. However, the genus is probably paraphyletic, and possibly even polyphyletic, with respect to several related genera such as Achradocera, Falbouria and Lyroneurus.

== Gallery ==
Chrysotus sp. on coarse woody debris

== Subgenera and species groups ==
The genus has two subgenera:

- Angiopus Meuffels & Grootaert, 1996 – includes only C. halteratus
- Chrysotus Meigen, 1824 – all other species are placed in this subgenus, split into many species groups and subgroups:
  - C. albipalpus species group
  - C. cilipes species group – Palaearctic
  - C. javanensis species group
  - C. laesus species group (22 species) – Palaearctic + Oriental
    - C. adunatus species subgroup (1) – includes only C. adunatus
    - C. brevicercus species subgroup (12)
    - C. nudisetus species subgroup (5)
    - C. laesus species subgroup (3)
    - C. trapezinus species subgroup (1) – includes only C. trapezinus
  - C. leigongshanus species group (59 species) – China
    - C. apicibifidus species subgroup (22)
    - C. apicirotundus species subgroup (9)
    - C. apicisetosus species subgroup (9)
    - C. chishuiensis species subgroup (10)
    - C. comminus species subgroup (2)
    - C. daozhenus species subgroup (3)
    - 4 unplaced species
  - C. longipalpus species group (12 species)
  - C. mediotinctus species group (5 species) – South America
  - C. niger (?) species group
  - C. papuanus species group (107 species) – China
    - C. abatus species subgroup (14)
    - C. abdominus species subgroup (88)
    - C. araeobasus species subgroup (3)
    - C. papuanus species subgroup (1) – includes only C. papuanus
    - C. zhuae species subgroup (1) – includes only C. zhuae
  - C. philtrum species group

== See also ==
- List of Chrysotus species
