= Nepalomyia =

- Nepalomyia sombrea

Scientific classification
- Kingdom: Animalia
- Phylum: Arthropoda
- Clade: Pancrustacea
- Class: Insecta
- Order: Diptera
- Family: Dolichopodidae
- Subfamily: Peloropeodinae
- Genus: Nepalomyia; Hollis, 1964

Type species
- Nepalomyia dytei Hollis, 1964

Synonyms
- Neurigonella Robinson, 1964

Genus of flies

Nepalomyia is a genus of flies in the family Dolichopodidae.

== Species ==
Species in the genus include:

- Nepalomyia aridita Wei & Yang, 2007
- Nepalomyia baliensis Yang, Saigusa & Masunaga, 2004
- Nepalomyia beijingensis Wang & Yang, 2005
- Nepalomyia bidentata (Yang & Saigusa, 2001)
- Nepalomyia biseta Wang, Yang & Grootaert, 2007
- Nepalomyia brevifurcata (Yang & Saigusa, 2001)
- Nepalomyia chalajae Negrobov, Selivanova and Maslova, 2018
- Nepalomyia chinensis (Yang, 2001)
- Nepalomyia confusa Hollis, 1964
- Nepalomyia crassata (Yang & Saigusa, 2001)
- Nepalomyia daliensis (Yang & Saigusa, 2001)
- Nepalomyia damingshanus Wang, Chen & Yang, 2014
- Nepalomyia daweishana (Yang & Saigusa, 2001)
- Nepalomyia dentata (Yang & Saigusa, 2001)
- Nepalomyia dilaticosta Runyon & Hurley, 2003
- Nepalomyia dongae Wang, Chen & Yang, 2014
- Nepalomyia dytei Hollis, 1964
- Nepalomyia effecta (Wei, 2006)
- Nepalomyia emeiensis Wang, Yang & Grootaert, 2007
- Nepalomyia fanjingensis (Wei, 2006)
- Nepalomyia flava (Yang & Saigusa, 2001)
- Nepalomyia fogangensis Wang, Yang & Grootaert, 2009
- Nepalomyia furcata (Yang & Saigusa, 2001)
- Nepalomyia guangdongensis Wang, Yang & Grootaert, 2009
- Nepalomyia guangxiensis Zhang & Yang, 2005
- Nepalomyia harpago Grootaert, 2013
- Nepalomyia hastata Wang, Yang & Grootaert, 2009
- Nepalomyia henanensis (Yang, Yang & Li, 1998)
- Nepalomyia henotica (Wei, 2006)
- Nepalomyia hesperia Runyon & Hurley, 2003
- Nepalomyia hiantula (Wei, 2006)
- Nepalomyia horvati Wang & Yang, 2004
- Nepalomyia hui Yang & Wang, 2006
- Nepalomyia igori Negrobov, Selivanova and Maslova, 2018
- Nepalomyia kotrbae Grichanov, 2010
- Nepalomyia liui Wang, Yang & Grootaert, 2007
- Nepalomyia longa (Yang & Saigusa, 2001)
- Nepalomyia longiseta (Yang & Saigusa, 2000)
- Nepalomyia lustrabilis (Wei, 2006)
- Nepalomyia luteipleurata (Yang & Saigusa, 2001)
- Nepalomyia nantouensis Wang, Yang & Masunaga, 2007
- Nepalomyia negrobovi Grootaert, 2013
- Nepalomyia nepalensis (Yang, Saigusa & Masunaga, 2003)
- Nepalomyia nigra (Yang, Saigusa & Masunaga, 2003)
- Nepalomyia nigricornis (Van Duzee, 1914)
- Nepalomyia orientalis (Yang & Li, 1998)
- Nepalomyia pallipes (Yang & Saigusa, 2000)
- Nepalomyia pallipilosa (Yang & Saigusa, 2001)
- Nepalomyia pilifera (Yang & Saigusa, 2001)
- Nepalomyia pingbiana (Yang & Saigusa, 2001)
- Nepalomyia priapus Grootaert, 2013
- Nepalomyia qiana Wei & Yang, 2007
- Nepalomyia reunionensis Grichanov, 2010
- Nepalomyia ruiliensis Wang & Yang, 2005
- Nepalomyia shennonjiaensis Wang, Chen & Yang, 2014
- Nepalomyia sichuanensis Wang, Yang & Grootaert, 2007
- Nepalomyia singaporensis Grootaert, 2013
- Nepalomyia siveci Wang & Yang, 2004
- Nepalomyia sombrea (Harmston & Knowlton, 1945)
- Nepalomyia spinata Grootaert, 2013
- Nepalomyia spiniformis Zhang & Yang, 2005
- Nepalomyia taiwanensis Wang & Yang, 2004
- Nepalomyia tatjanae (Negrobov, 1984)
- Nepalomyia temasek Grootaert, 2013
- Nepalomyia tianlinensis Zhang & Yang, 2005
- Nepalomyia tianmushana (Yang, 2001)
- Nepalomyia trifurcata (Yang & Saigusa, 2000)
- Nepalomyia tuberculosa (Yang & Saigusa, 2001)
- Nepalomyia ventralis Wang, Yang & Grootaert, 2007
- Nepalomyia xiaoyanae Wang, Chen & Yang, 2013
- Nepalomyia xui Wang, Yang & Grootaert, 2009
- Nepalomyia yangi Wang, Yang & Grootaert, 2007
- Nepalomyia yunnanensis (Yang & Saigusa, 2001)
- Nepalomyia zengchengensis Wang, Yang & Grootaert, 2007
- Nepalomyia zhangae Wang, Yang & Grootaert, 2009
- Nepalomyia zhouzhiensis (Yang & Saigusa, 2001)

Species moved to other genera:

- Nepalomyia jinshanensis Wang, Yang & Grootaert, 2009: moved to Micromorphus
