= Oocephala agrianthoides =

Conservation status
- Endangered (IUCN 3.1)

Scientific classification
- Kingdom: Plantae
- Clade: Embryophytes
- Clade: Tracheophytes
- Clade: Angiosperms
- Clade: Eudicots
- Clade: Asterids
- Order: Asterales
- Family: Asteraceae
- Genus: Oocephala
- Species: O. agrianthoides

Binomial name
- Oocephala agrianthoides (C.Jeffrey) H.Rob.

Synonyms
- Vernonia agrianthoides C.Jeffrey

Species of flowering plant

Oocephala agrianthoides is a plant in the family Asteraceae, native to Central Africa.

== Description ==
Oocephala agrianthoides grows as a herb, measuring up to 60 centimetres (24 in) tall. Its sessile leaves are lanceolate and measure up to 4.3 cm (2 in) long. The capitula feature red, lilac or purple flowers. The fruits are achenes.

== Distribution and habitat ==
Oocephala agrianthoides is native to Burundi and Tanzania. Its habitat is savanna grasslands and rocky areas at altitudes of 1,050–1,550 m (3,400–5,100 ft).

== Conservation ==
Oocephala agrianthoides has been assessed as endangered on the IUCN Red List. The species is threatened by agriculture, tree plantations and cattle overgrazing.
