= Haroldia =

Haroldia may refer to:

- Haroldia (fly), a genus of flies in the family Asilidae
- Haroldia (plant), a genus of plants in the family Asteraceae
