= Sympycnidelphus =

Scientific classification
- Kingdom: Animalia
- Phylum: Arthropoda
- Class: Insecta
- Order: Diptera
- Family: Dolichopodidae
- Subfamily: Stolidosomatinae
- Genus: Sympycnidelphus; Robinson, 1964

Type species
- Sympycnidelphus sharpi Robinson, 1964

Genus of flies

Sympycnidelphus is a genus of fly in the family Dolichopodidae.

== Species ==
- Sympycnidelphus californicus Harmston, 1968
- Sympycnidelphus coxalis Robinson, 1967
- Sympycnidelphus sharpi Robinson, 1964
- Sympycnidelphus texanus Harmston, 1968
- Sympycnidelphus tibialis Robinson, 1967
