= Orbivestus cinerascens =

Scientific classification
- Kingdom: Plantae
- Clade: Tracheophytes
- Clade: Angiosperms
- Clade: Eudicots
- Clade: Asterids
- Order: Asterales
- Family: Asteraceae
- Genus: Orbivestus
- Species: O. cinerascens

Binomial name
- Orbivestus cinerascens (Sch.Bip.) H.Rob.

Synonyms
- Vernonia cinerascens Sch.Bip.; Vernonia luederitziana O.Hoffm.; Vernonia tephrodoides Chiov.

Species of plant in the daisy family

Orbivestus cinerascens is a plant in the family Asteraceae.

== Description ==
Orbivestus cinerascens grows as a herb, measuring up to 2 metres (7 ft) tall. Its grey-green sessile leaves are spatulate to obovate and measure up to 2 cm (1 in) long. The capitula feature purplish flowers. The fruits are achenes.

== Distribution and habitat ==
Orbivestus cinerascens is native to many parts of Africa and also to the Arabian Peninsula and Indian subcontinent. Its habitat is subdesert grasslands and Acacia-Commiphora bushlands at altitudes of 300–1,350 m (1,000–4,000 ft).
