= Stolidosoma =

Scientific classification
- Kingdom: Animalia
- Phylum: Arthropoda
- Class: Insecta
- Order: Diptera
- Family: Dolichopodidae
- Subfamily: Stolidosomatinae
- Genus: Stolidosoma; Becker, 1922

Type species
- Stolidosoma permutans Becker, 1922

Genus of flies

Stolidosoma is a genus of fly in the family Dolichopodidae.

== Species ==
- Stolidosoma abbreviatum Parent, 1928
- Stolidosoma abdominale Robinson, 1967
- Stolidosoma acutum Robinson, 1967
- Stolidosoma bicolor Parent, 1934
- Stolidosoma currani (Van Duzee, 1931)
- Stolidosoma cyaneum Becker, 1922
- Stolidosoma eques (Loew, 1864)
- Stolidosoma flavicauda (Van Duzee, 1931)
- Stolidosoma flavidum Robinson, 1967
- Stolidosoma hexachaetum Robinson, 1967
- Stolidosoma inornatum Robinson, 1967
- Stolidosoma lucidum Becker, 1922
- Stolidosoma microgamum (Parent, 1928)
- Stolidosoma obscurum Parent, 1931
- Stolidosoma permutans Becker, 1922
- Stolidosoma unispina (Van Duzee, 1931)
- Stolidosoma varipes Robinson, 1967
- Stolidosoma violaceum (Van Duzee, 1929)
