= Orbivestus karaguensis =

Scientific classification
- Kingdom: Plantae
- Clade: Tracheophytes
- Clade: Angiosperms
- Clade: Eudicots
- Clade: Asterids
- Order: Asterales
- Family: Asteraceae
- Genus: Orbivestus
- Species: O. karaguensis

Binomial name
- Orbivestus karaguensis (Oliv. & Hiern) H.Rob.

Synonyms
- Cacalia burtonii Kuntze; Cacalia karaguensis Kuntze; Vernonia bothrioclinoides C.H.Wright; Vernonia burtonii Oliv. & Hiern; Vernonia campanea S.Moore; Vernonia cistifolia O.Hoffm.; Vernonia elliotii S.Moore; Vernonia johannis Volk. & O.Hoffm.; Vernonia karaguensis Oliv. & Hiern; Vernonia melanacrophylla Cufod.; Vernonia pilgeriana Muschl.; Vernonia porphyrolepis S.Moore

Species of plant in the daisy family

Orbivestus karaguensis is a plant in the family Asteraceae, native to Africa.

== Description ==
Orbivestus karaguensis grows as a perennial herb or subshrub. The ovate or elliptic leaves measure up to 15 cm (6 in) long. The capitula feature purplish flowers. The fruits are achenes.

== Distribution and habitat ==
Orbivestus karaguensis is native to an area of Africa from Sudan south to Mozambique and west to Angola and Nigeria. Its habitat is grassland or woodland at altitudes of 500–2,850 m (2,000–9,000 ft).
