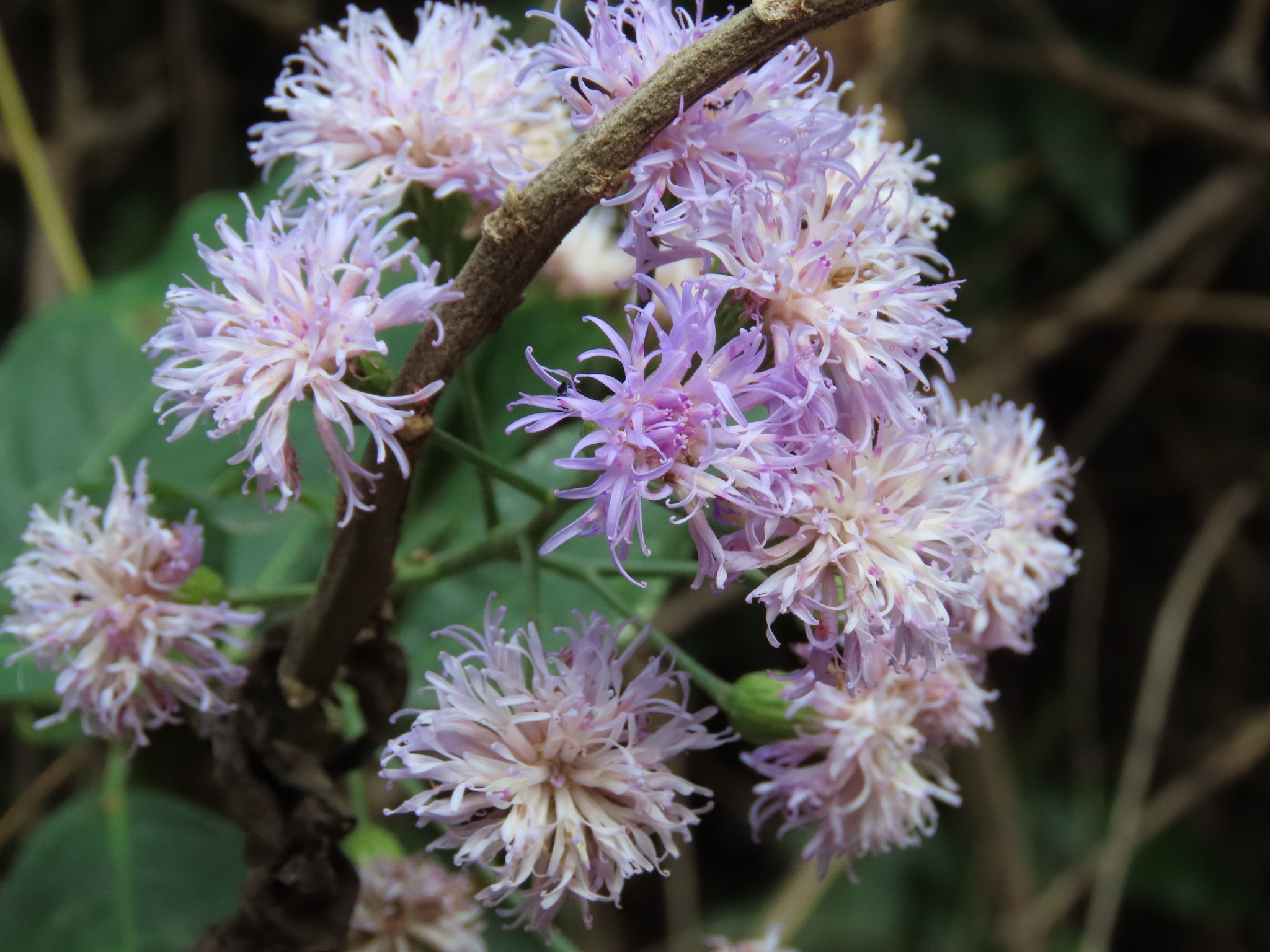
- Quechualia fulta

Scientific classification
- Kingdom: Plantae
- Clade: Embryophytes
- Clade: Tracheophytes
- Clade: Angiosperms
- Clade: Eudicots
- Clade: Asterids
- Order: Asterales
- Family: Asteraceae
- Subfamily: Vernonioideae
- Tribe: Vernonieae
- Genus: Quechualia; H.Rob.

Species
- See text

= Quechualia =

Genus of flowering plants

Quechualia is a genus of flowering plants in the family Asteraceae, native to South America. They can be distinguished from Vernonia by the presence of long hairs on the insides of the throats of their corollas.

== Species ==
Currently accepted species include:

- Quechualia cardenasii (H.Rob.) H.Rob.
- Quechualia fulta (Griseb.) H.Rob.
- Quechualia smithii H.Rob.
- Quechualia trixioides (Rusby) H.Rob.
