= Orbivestus turbinata =

Scientific classification
- Kingdom: Plantae
- Clade: Tracheophytes
- Clade: Angiosperms
- Clade: Eudicots
- Clade: Asterids
- Order: Asterales
- Family: Asteraceae
- Genus: Orbivestus
- Species: O. turbinata

Binomial name
- Orbivestus turbinata (Oliv. & Hiern ex Oliv.) H.Rob.

Synonyms
- Cacalia turbinata Kuntze; Vernonia rugosifolia De Wild.; Vernonia turbinata Oliv. & Hiern ex Oliv.

Species of plant in the daisy family

Orbivestus turbinata is a plant in the family Asteraceae, native to tropical Africa.

== Description ==
Orbivestus turbinata grows as a herb, measuring up to 1.2 metres (4 ft) tall. The ovate or lanceolate leaves measure up to 23 cm (9 in) long. The capitula feature purple flowers. The fruits are achenes.

== Distribution and habitat ==
Orbivestus turbinata is native to Sudan, Ethiopia, the Democratic Republic of the Congo, Uganda and Kenya. Its habitat is grasslands, sometimes wooded, at altitudes of 1,050–2,250 m (3,000–7,000 ft).
