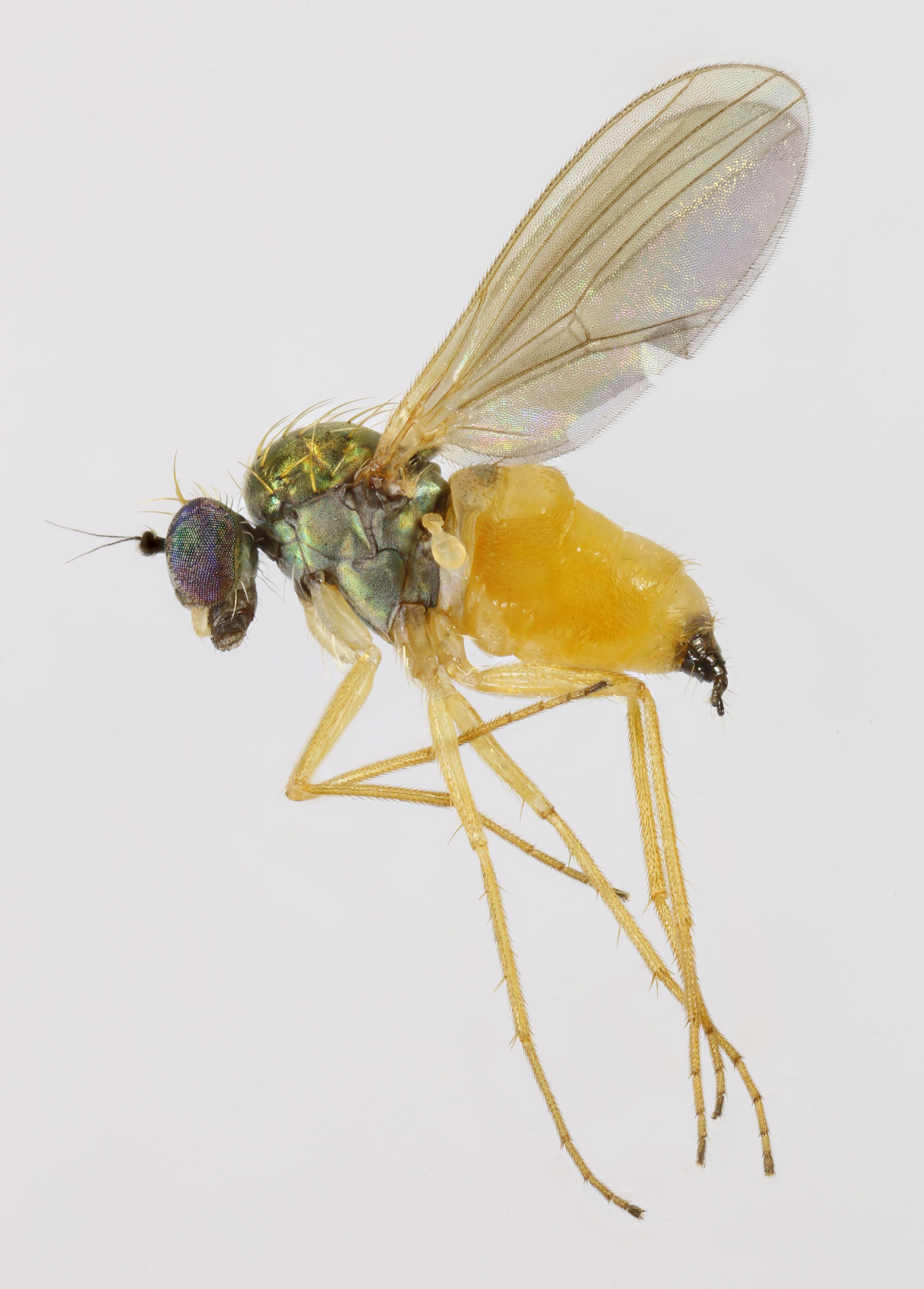
- Chrysotimus molliculus

Scientific classification
- Kingdom: Animalia
- Phylum: Arthropoda
- Clade: Pancrustacea
- Class: Insecta
- Order: Diptera
- Family: Dolichopodidae
- Subfamily: Peloropeodinae; Robinson, 1970

Genera
- see text

= Peloropeodinae =

Subfamily of flies

Peloropeodinae is a subfamily of flies in the family Dolichopodidae. In some classifications, the genera of the subfamily are included in Sympycninae. According to a molecular phylogenetic analysis of the family Dolichopodidae by Germann et al. (2011), the subfamily is polyphyletic.

== Genera ==
- Acropsilus Mik, 1878 (unplaced in Dolichopodidae)
- Alishanimyia Bickel, 2007
- Anepsiomyia Bezzi, 1902
- Chrysotimus Loew, 1857
- Cremmus Wei, 2006
- Discopygiella Robinson, 1965
- Fedtshenkomyia Stackelberg, 1927
- Griphophanes Grootaert & Meuffels, 1998
- Guzeriplia Negrobov, 1968 (possibly a synonym of Chrysotimus)
- Hadromerella De Meijere, 1916
- Korotongo Bickel, 2023
- Meuffelsia Grichanov, 2008
- Micromorphus Mik, 1878
- Nanomyina Robinson, 1964
- Neochrysotimus Yang, Saigusa & Masunaga, 2008
- Nepalomyia Hollis, 1964
- †Palaeomedeterus Meunier, 1895
- Peloropeodes Wheeler, 1890
- Pseudoxanthochlorus Negrobov, 1977
- Vetimicrotes Dyte, 1980

The genus Notobothrus Parent, 1931 was formerly included in the subfamily, but was excluded from it and provisionally left incertae sedis within the family Dolichopodidae in 2020.
