= Stolidosomatinae =

Scientific classification
- Domain: Eukaryota
- Kingdom: Animalia
- Phylum: Arthropoda
- Class: Insecta
- Order: Diptera
- Family: Dolichopodidae
- Subfamily: Stolidosomatinae; Becker, 1922

Genera
- see text

Subfamily of flies

Stolidosomatinae is a subfamily of flies in the family Dolichopodidae. According to a molecular phylogenetic analysis of the family by Germann et al. (2011), the subfamily is monophyletic but should actually be placed within Sympycninae.

== Genera ==
The subfamily includes three genera:

- Pseudosympycnus Robinson, 1967
- Stolidosoma Becker, 1922
- Sympycnidelphus Robinson, 1964
