= N. intermedia =

N. intermedia may refer to:

- Navia intermedia, a plant species endemic to Venezuela
- Nephroselmis intermedia, an alga species in the genus Nephroselmis
- Neurospora intermedia, a mold species in the genus Neurospora
- Nycteris intermedia, the intermediate slit-faced bat, a mammal species found in west and central Africa

== See also ==
- Intermedia (disambiguation)
