= Orbivestus homilanthus =

Conservation status
- Vulnerable (IUCN 3.1)

Scientific classification
- Kingdom: Plantae
- Clade: Tracheophytes
- Clade: Angiosperms
- Clade: Eudicots
- Clade: Asterids
- Order: Asterales
- Family: Asteraceae
- Genus: Orbivestus
- Species: O. homilanthus

Binomial name
- Orbivestus homilanthus (S.Moore) H.Rob.

Synonyms
- Vernonia homilantha S.Moore; Vernonia sennii Chiov.

Species of plant in the daisy family

Orbivestus homilanthus is a plant in the family Asteraceae.

== Description ==
Orbivestus homilanthus grows as a herb or shrub, measuring up to 3 metres (10 ft) tall. Its lanceolate to obovate leaves measure up to 8.5 cm (3 in) long. The capitula feature blue, mauve or purple flowers. The fruits are achenes.

== Distribution and habitat ==
Orbivestus homilanthus is endemic to Kenya, where it is confined to Lamu and Kilifi Counties. Its habitat is bushland and forest margins up to the coastline. The species is threatened by coastal development for tourism.
