= Peloropeodes =

Peloropeodes Temporal range: Miocene–Present

Scientific classification
- Kingdom: Animalia
- Phylum: Arthropoda
- Class: Insecta
- Order: Diptera
- Family: Dolichopodidae
- Subfamily: Peloropeodinae
- Genus: Peloropeodes; Wheeler, 1890

Type species
- Peloropeodes salax Wheeler, 1890

Synonyms
- Anomalopyga Oldenberg, 1916; Kophosoma Van Duzee, 1926; Pachypyga Parent, 1928; Neorhaphium Botosaneanu & Vaillant, 1973

Genus of flies

Peloropeodes is a genus of flies in the family Dolichopodidae.

== Species ==
- Peloropeodes acuticornis (Oldenberg, 1916)
- Peloropeodes aldrichi Robinson, 1970
- Peloropeodes apicales Harmston & Knowlton, 1946
- Peloropeodes bicolor (Van Duzee, 1926)
- Peloropeodes brevis (Van Duzee, 1926)
- Peloropeodes comorensis Grichanov, 2000
- Peloropeodes cornutus (Van Duzee, 1926)
- Peloropeodes costaericae (Parent, 1928)
- Peloropeodes coxalis (Aldrich, 1901)
- Peloropeodes debilis Robinson, 1975
- Peloropeodes decembris Grichanov, 2000
- Peloropeodes discolor Robinson, 1964
- Peloropeodes dominicensis Robinson, 1975
- Peloropeodes exiguus (Van Duzee, 1933)
- Peloropeodes falco (Aldrich, 1896)
- Peloropeodes frater (Aldrich, 1902)
- Peloropeodes fuscipes (Van Duzee, 1926)
- Peloropeodes genitalis (Parent, 1931)
- Peloropeodes leigongshanensis Wei & Yang, 2007
- Peloropeodes madagascariensis (Dyte & Smith, 1980)
- Peloropeodes magnicornis Harmston & Rapp, 1968
- Peloropeodes matilei Grichanov, 2000
- Peloropeodes meridionalis (Parent, 1928)
- Peloropeodes niger (Curran, 1926)
- Peloropeodes ornatipes (Van Duzee, 1930)
- †Peloropeodes paleomexicana Bickel & Solórzano Kraemer, 2016
- Peloropeodes pygidus Harmston & Rapp, 1968
- Peloropeodes salax Wheeler, 1890
- Peloropeodes similis (Aldrich, 1896)
- Peloropeodes spinitarsis (Botosaneanu & Vaillant, 1973)
- Peloropeodes tsacasi Grichanov, 2000
