= Clibadium pentaneuron =

Scientific classification
- Kingdom: Plantae
- Clade: Tracheophytes
- Clade: Angiosperms
- Clade: Eudicots
- Clade: Asterids
- Order: Asterales
- Family: Asteraceae
- Tribe: Heliantheae
- Genus: Clibadium
- Species: C. pentaneuron

Binomial name
- Clibadium pentaneuron S.F.Blake

Synonyms
- Clibadium sarmentosum Cuatrec.; Clibadium zakii H.Rob.

Species of flowering plant

Clibadium pentaneuron, synonym Clibadium zakii, is a species of flowering plant in the family Asteraceae. It is native to Colombia and Ecuador. In Ecuador, its natural habitat is subtropical or tropical moist montane forests.

== Conservation ==
Clibadium zakii was assessed as "vulnerable" in the 2003 IUCN Red List, where it is said to be native only to Ecuador. As of April 2023, C. zakii was regarded as a synonym of Clibadium pentaneuron, which is also found in Colombia.
