= Vetimicrotes =

Scientific classification
- Kingdom: Animalia
- Phylum: Arthropoda
- Class: Insecta
- Order: Diptera
- Family: Dolichopodidae
- Subfamily: Peloropeodinae
- Genus: Vetimicrotes; Dyte, 1980

Type species
- Microtes mediterraneus Becker, 1918

Synonyms
- Microtes Becker, 1918 (nec Scudder, 1900)

Genus of flies

Vetimicrotes is a genus of flies in the family Dolichopodidae. It is distributed in the Palaearctic realm. The genus was originally named Microtes by Theodor Becker in 1918. Afterwards, the name was found to be preoccupied by the grasshopper genus Microtes (Scudder, 1900), so it was renamed to Vetimicrotes by C. E. Dyte in 1980.

The genus was originally included in the subfamily Sympycninae, and it has since been placed either in the Dolichopodidae or Peloropeodinae. A cladistic analysis of Dolichopodinae by Scott E. Brooks in 2005 indicated that Vetimicrotes did not belong to it, though the systematic position of the genus within the family Dolichopodidae was still unclear.

== Species ==
- Vetimicrotes baskunchakensis Grichanov, 2011
- Vetimicrotes mediterraneus (Becker, 1918)
- Vetimicrotes nartshukae (Negrobov, 1976)
