= Orbivestus =

Scientific classification
- Kingdom: Plantae
- Clade: Tracheophytes
- Clade: Angiosperms
- Clade: Eudicots
- Clade: Asterids
- Order: Asterales
- Family: Asteraceae
- Subfamily: Vernonioideae
- Tribe: Vernonieae
- Genus: Orbivestus; H.Rob. (1999)

Species
- See text

Synonyms
- Namibithamnus H.Rob., Skvarla & V.A.Funk (2016)

Genus of plants in the daisy family

Orbivestus is a genus of shrubs in the family Asteraceae, native to tropical Africa, the Arabian Peninsula and the Indian subcontinent. Its species were formerly placed in the genus Vernonia.

== Species ==
As of June 2024, Plants of the World Online recognises the following species. In 2009, Robinson provisionally rejected the inclusion of Orbivestus undulatus.

- Orbivestus albocinerascens (C.Jeffrey) Isawumi
- Orbivestus bamendae (C.D.Adams) Isawumi
- Orbivestus blumeoides (Hook.f.) Isawumi
- Orbivestus catumbensis (Hiern) H.Rob.
- Orbivestus cinerascens (Sch.Bip.) H.Rob.
- Orbivestus homilanthus (S.Moore) H.Rob.
- Orbivestus karaguensis (Oliv. & Hiern) H.Rob.
- Orbivestus leopoldii (Sch.Bip. ex Walp.) H.Rob.
- Orbivestus obionifolius (O.Hoffm.) J.C.Manning
- Orbivestus teitensis (O.Hoffm.) H.Rob.
- Orbivestus turbinata (Oliv. & Hiern ex Oliv.) H.Rob.
- Orbivestus undulatus (Oliv. & Hiern) H.Rob.
- Orbivestus unionis (Sch.Bip. ex Walp.) H.Rob.
