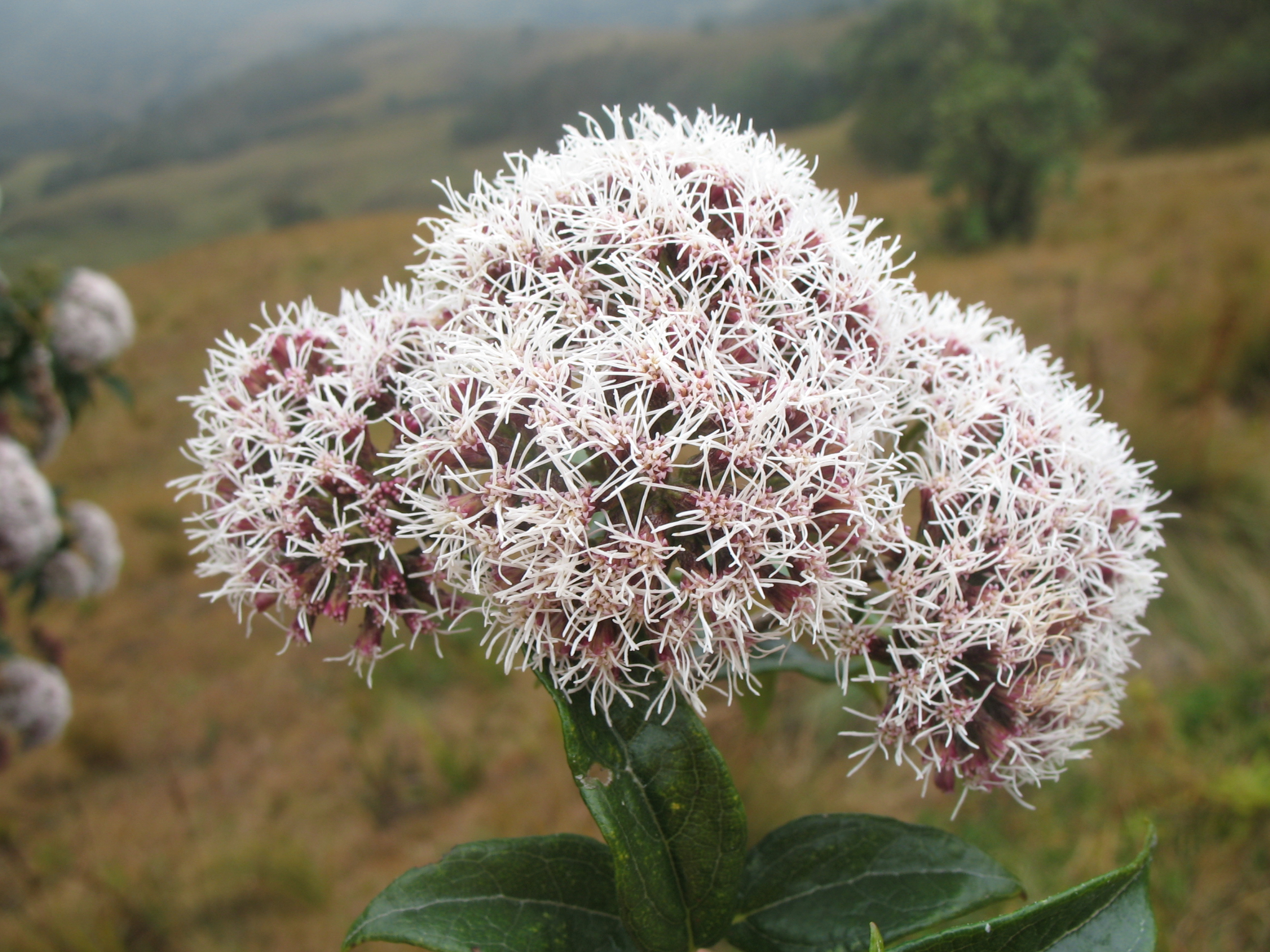
- Badilloa salicina

Scientific classification
- Kingdom: Plantae
- Clade: Embryophytes
- Clade: Tracheophytes
- Clade: Spermatophytes
- Clade: Angiosperms
- Clade: Eudicots
- Clade: Asterids
- Order: Asterales
- Family: Asteraceae
- Subfamily: Asteroideae
- Tribe: Eupatorieae
- Genus: Badilloa; R.M.King & H.Rob.

= Badilloa =

Genus of flowering plants

Badilloa is a genus of shrubs and small trees in the family Asteraceae.

Badilloa is native to the Andes of northwestern South America, from Venezuela to Peru.

Species

- Badilloa atrescens
- Badilloa drepanoides
- Badilloa helianthemifolia
- Badilloa helianthifolia
- Badilloa herrerae
- Badilloa procera
- Badilloa salicina
- Badilloa sonsonensis
- Badilloa sphagnophila
- Badilloa steetzii
- Badilloa venezuelensis
