= Discopygiella =

Scientific classification
- Kingdom: Animalia
- Phylum: Arthropoda
- Class: Insecta
- Order: Diptera
- Family: Dolichopodidae
- Subfamily: Peloropeodinae
- Genus: Discopygiella; Robinson, 1965

Type species
- Discopygiella setosa Robinson, 1965

Genus of flies

Discopygiella is a genus of flies in the family Dolichopodidae. It is distributed in the Neotropical realm.

== Species ==
- Discopygiella chiapensis Robinson, 1965 – Mexico, Panama
- Discopygiella discolor Robinson, 1965 – Mexico, Panama
- Discopygiella maculata Robinson, 1975 – Dominica
- Discopygiella setosa Robinson, 1965 – Mexico
- Discopygiella xerophila Robinson, 1965 – Mexico
