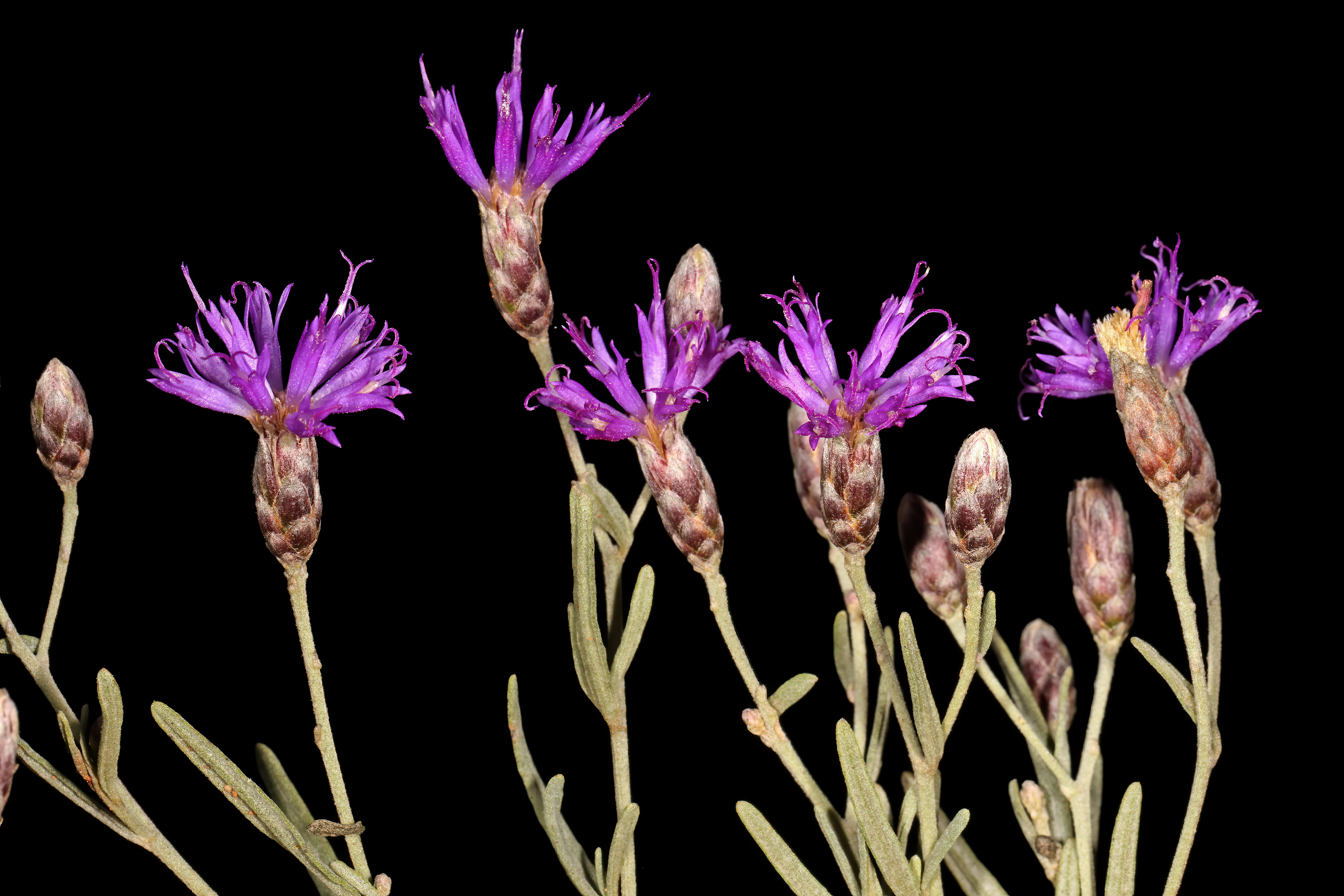
- Oocephala staehelinoides

Scientific classification
- Kingdom: Plantae
- Clade: Embryophytes
- Clade: Tracheophytes
- Clade: Angiosperms
- Clade: Eudicots
- Clade: Asterids
- Order: Asterales
- Family: Asteraceae
- Subfamily: Vernonioideae
- Tribe: Vernonieae
- Genus: Oocephala (S.B.Jones) H.Rob.

Species
- See text

= Oocephala =

Genus of flowering plants

Oocephala is a genus of plants in the family Asteraceae, native to Africa. The name means "egghead", referring to the egg-shaped capitulum, which distinguishes the genus from its close relative Polydora. Some species were formerly placed in the genus Vernonia.

== Species ==
As of October 2020, Plants of the World Online recognises the following species.

- Oocephala agrianthoides (C.Jeffrey) H.Rob.
- Oocephala centauroides (Klatt) H.Rob. & Skvarla
- Oocephala staehelinoides (Harv.) H.Rob. & Skvarla
- Oocephala stenocephala (Oliv.) H.Rob.

In 1999, Robinson described two Oocephala species: O. agrianthoides and O. stenocephala. In 2014, Robinson and Skvarla added two more species: O. centauroides and O. staehelinoides.
