= Fedchenko =

Fedchenko (Ukrainian: Федченко), sometimes transliterated Fedtschenko, is a Ukrainian surname. Notable people with the surname include:

- Alexei Fedchenko (1844–1873), Russian explorer and naturalist, after whom Fedchenko Glacier (now called the Vanch-Yakh Glacier) in Tajikistan is named
- Boris Fedtschenko (1872–1947), Russian phytopathologist, son of Alexei
- Olga Fedchenko (1845–1921), Russian botanist, wife of Alexei

== See also ==
- 3195 Fedchenko, a minor planet
- Fedtshenkomyia, a genus of flies
