= Badilloa atrescens =

Conservation status
- Endangered (IUCN 3.1)

Scientific classification
- Kingdom: Plantae
- Clade: Tracheophytes
- Clade: Angiosperms
- Clade: Eudicots
- Clade: Asterids
- Order: Asterales
- Family: Asteraceae
- Genus: Badilloa
- Species: B. atrescens

Binomial name
- Badilloa atrescens (B.L.Rob.) R.M.King & H.Rob.

Species of flowering plant

Badilloa atrescens is a species of flowering plant in the family Asteraceae. It is endemic to Ecuador, where it is known from only two locations in the central Andes. It grows in forest habitat between 2000 and 3000 meters in elevation.
