= Clibadium laxum =

Scientific classification
- Kingdom: Plantae
- Clade: Tracheophytes
- Clade: Angiosperms
- Clade: Eudicots
- Clade: Asterids
- Order: Asterales
- Family: Asteraceae
- Tribe: Heliantheae
- Genus: Clibadium
- Species: C. laxum

Binomial name
- Clibadium laxum S.F.Blake

Synonyms
- Clibadium alatum H.Rob.; Clibadium lehmannianum O.E.Schulz; Clibadium terebinthinaceum var. ecuadorense O.E.Schulz

Species of flowering plant

Clibadium laxum, synonym Clibadium alatum, is a species of flowering plant in the family Asteraceae. It is native to Colombia and Ecuador. In Ecuador, its natural habitats are subtropical or tropical moist lowland forests and subtropical or tropical moist montane forests.

== Conservation ==
Clibadium alatum was assessed as "vulnerable" in the 2003 IUCN Red List, where it is said to be native only to Ecuador. As of April 2023, C. alatum was regarded as a synonym of Clibadium laxum, which is also found in Colombia.
