= Nanomyina =

Scientific classification
- Kingdom: Animalia
- Phylum: Arthropoda
- Class: Insecta
- Order: Diptera
- Family: Dolichopodidae
- Subfamily: Peloropeodinae
- Genus: Nanomyina; Robinson, 1964
- Species: N. barbata

Binomial name
- Nanomyina barbata (Aldrich, 1902)

Synonyms
- Chrysotimus barbata Aldrich, 1902; Nanomyina litorea Robinson, 1964

Genus of flies

Nanomyina is a genus of long-legged flies in the family Dolichopodidae. There is only one described species in Nanomyina, Nanomyina barbata.

Nanomyina barbata is found on the east coast of North and Central America. The name "barbata", meaning "bearded", refers to the bristles across the lower face of the fly.

John Merton Aldrich first described this species as Chrysotimus barbata in 1902. In 1964, Harold E. Robinson created the genus Nanomyina. This genus contained only Nanomyina litorea, described by Robinson in the same publication. In 1970, Robinson determined Nanomyina litorea to be a synonym of Chrysotimus barbata, at the same time moving C. barbata to Nanomyina, leaving C. barbata as the only species in the genus.
