= Pseudosympycnus =

Scientific classification
- Kingdom: Animalia
- Phylum: Arthropoda
- Class: Insecta
- Order: Diptera
- Family: Dolichopodidae
- Subfamily: Stolidosomatinae
- Genus: Pseudosympycnus; Robinson, 1967

Type species
- Sympycnus palpiger Van Duzee, 1931

Genus of flies

Pseudosympycnus is a genus of flies in the family Dolichopodidae. It is distributed in the Neotropical realm.

== Species ==
Species in the genus include:

- Pseudosympycnus albipalpus (Parent, 1930)
- Pseudosympycnus araza Soares & Capellari, 2020
- Pseudosympycnus bickeli Soares & Capellari, 2020
- Pseudosympycnus bicolor Robinson, 1967
- Pseudosympycnus latipes (Parent, 1930)
- Pseudosympycnus latitarsus Soares & Ale-Rocha, 2022
- Pseudosympycnus latitibia Soares & Capellari, 2020
- Pseudosympycnus maroaga Soares & Capellari, 2020
- Pseudosympycnus palpiger (Van Duzee, 1931)
- Pseudosympycnus pennipes Soares & Ale-Rocha, 2022
- Pseudosympycnus perornatus Robinson, 1967
- Pseudosympycnus rafaeli Soares & Ale-Rocha, 2022
- Pseudosympycnus robinsoni Soares & Capellari, 2020
- Pseudosympycnus sehnali Soares & Capellari, 2020
- Pseudosympycnus singularis (Parent, 1934)
