= Oocephala stenocephala =

Scientific classification
- Kingdom: Plantae
- Clade: Embryophytes
- Clade: Tracheophytes
- Clade: Angiosperms
- Clade: Eudicots
- Clade: Asterids
- Order: Asterales
- Family: Asteraceae
- Genus: Oocephala
- Species: O. stenocephala

Binomial name
- Oocephala stenocephala (Oliv.) H.Rob.

Synonyms
- Cacalia stenocephala Kuntze; Vernonia luteoalbida De Wild.; Vernonia oocephala Baker; Vernonia stenocephala Oliv.

Species of flowering plant

Oocephala stenocephala is a plant in the family Asteraceae, native to tropical Africa.

== Description ==
Oocephala stenocephala grows as a herb or subshrub, measuring up to 30–120 centimetres (10–50 in) tall. Its lanceolate leaves measure up to 7 cm (3 in) long. The capitula feature blue, white or purple flowers. The fruits are achenes.

== Distribution and habitat ==
Oocephala stenocephala is native to an area of Africa from Nigeria southeast to Mozambique. Its habitat is woodlands and high grasslands at altitudes of 1,050–1,800 m (3,400–5,900 ft).
