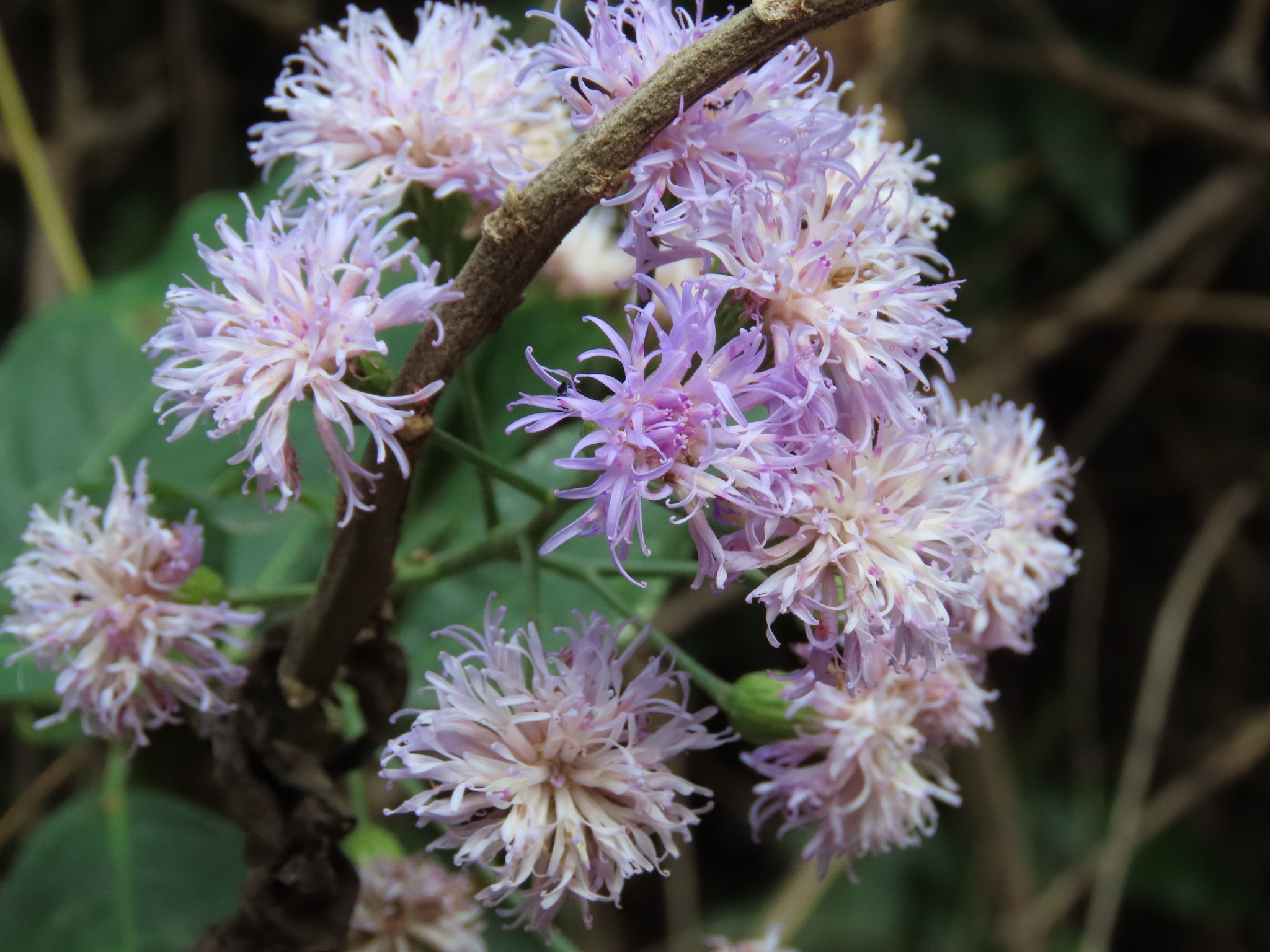

Scientific classification
- Kingdom: Plantae
- Clade: Tracheophytes
- Clade: Angiosperms
- Clade: Eudicots
- Clade: Asterids
- Order: Asterales
- Family: Asteraceae
- Genus: Quechualia
- Species: Q. fulta

Binomial name
- Quechualia fulta (Griseb.) H.Rob. 1993

Synonyms
- Cacalia fulta (Griseb.) Kuntze; Vernonia fulta Griseb.; Lycoseris denticulata Less.; Onoseris denticulata (Less.) Willd. ex DC.; Vernonia senecionifolia Britton

= Quechualia fulta =

Species of flowering plant

Quechualia fulta is a species of herbaceous shrub in the family Asteraceae.

== Habitat ==
The species is native to Peru, Bolivia, and Argentina.

== Description ==
Quechualia fulta grows 1–2 m (3–5 ft) tall and flowers in spring and summer. It emits branching branches, ending in drooping inflorescences of pink/mauve flowers.
