= Clibadium glabrescens =

Scientific classification
- Kingdom: Plantae
- Clade: Tracheophytes
- Clade: Angiosperms
- Clade: Eudicots
- Clade: Asterids
- Order: Asterales
- Family: Asteraceae
- Tribe: Heliantheae
- Genus: Clibadium
- Species: C. glabrescens

Binomial name
- Clibadium glabrescens S.F.Blake

Synonyms
- Clibadium napoense H.Rob.

Species of flowering plant

Clibadium glabrescens, synonym Clibadium napoense, is a species of flowering plant in the family Asteraceae. It is native to Colombia, Ecuador and Venezuela. In Ecuador, its natural habitat is subtropical or tropical moist lowland forests.

== Conservation ==
Clibadium napoense was assessed as "vulnerable" in the 2003 IUCN Red List, where it is said to be native only to Ecuador. As of April 2023, C. alatum was regarded as a synonym of Clibadium glabrescens, which is also found in Colombia and Venezuela.
