= N. aurea =

N. aurea may refer to:

- Nausithoe aurea, a species of crown jellyfish found off the southeastern coast of Brazil
- Navia aurea, a plant species endemic to Venezuela
- Nectandra aurea, a plant species endemic to Venezuela

== See also ==
- Aurea (disambiguation)
