= Orbivestus catumbensis =

Scientific classification
- Kingdom: Plantae
- Clade: Tracheophytes
- Clade: Angiosperms
- Clade: Eudicots
- Clade: Asterids
- Order: Asterales
- Family: Asteraceae
- Genus: Orbivestus
- Species: O. catumbensis

Binomial name
- Orbivestus catumbensis (Hiern) H.Rob.

Synonyms
- Vernonia catumbensis Hiern

Species of plant in the daisy family

Orbivestus catumbensis is a plant in the family Asteraceae, native to Angola and Zambia.

== Description ==
Orbivestus catumbensis grows as a herb, measuring up to 2 metres (7 ft) tall. The oblanceolate leaves measure up to 17 cm (7 in) long. The capitula each have about 18 purple or mauve-white flowers. The fruits are achenes.
