= Oocephala centauroides =

Scientific classification
- Kingdom: Plantae
- Clade: Embryophytes
- Clade: Tracheophytes
- Clade: Angiosperms
- Clade: Eudicots
- Clade: Asterids
- Order: Asterales
- Family: Asteraceae
- Genus: Oocephala
- Species: O. centauroides

Binomial name
- Oocephala centauroides (Klatt) H.Rob. & Skvarla

Synonyms
- Cacalia schlechteri Kuntze; Vernonia centauroides Klatt

Species of flowering plant

Oocephala centauroides is a plant in the family Asteraceae. It is native to Mozambique, Eswatini and South Africa (Northern Provinces, KwaZulu-Natal).

== Description ==
Oocephala centauroides grows as a herb, measuring up to 70 centimetres (28 in) tall. Its oblanceolate leaves measure up to 4.5 cm (2 in) long. The capitula feature purplish flowers. The fruits are achenes.
