= Micromorphus =

Scientific classification
- Kingdom: Animalia
- Phylum: Arthropoda
- Class: Insecta
- Order: Diptera
- Family: Dolichopodidae
- Subfamily: Peloropeodinae
- Genus: Micromorphus; Mik, 1878

Type species
- Hydrophorus albipes Zetterstedt, 1843

Synonyms
- Cachonopus Vaillant, 1953 (nomen nudum)

Genus of flies

Micromorphus is a genus of flies in the family Dolichopodidae.

== Species ==
- Micromorphus aereus (Vaillant, 1953) – Algeria
- Micromorphus albipes (Zetterstedt, 1843) – Europe, Algeria, Azores, China, Egypt, Iraq, Israel, Mongolia, Morocco, Turkey, West Bank
- Micromorphus alpester Negrobov, 2000 – Tajikistan
- Micromorphus alutaceus Negrobov, 2000 – Tajikistan
- Micromorphus amurensis Negrobov, 2000 – Russia (Primorye)
- Micromorphus aristalis (Curran, 1926) – South Africa (Eastern Cape: East London)
- Micromorphus asymmetricus Robinson, 1967 – Mexico
- Micromorphus bifrons Robinson, 1964 – United States
- Micromorphus brasiliensis (Van Duzee, 1933) – Brazil
- Micromorphus caudatus (Aldrich, 1902) – West Indies, Central America
- Micromorphus claripennis (Strobl, 1899) – Germany, Spain, Russia
- Micromorphus ethiopiensis Grichanov, 2013 – Ethiopia
- Micromorphus fulvosetosus Parent, 1929 – United States, Mexico
- Micromorphus grichanovi Negrobov, 2000 – Afghanistan, Tajikistan
- Micromorphus jakutensis Negrobov, 2000 – Russia (Yakutia)
- Micromorphus jinshanensis (Wang, Yang & Grootaert, 2009) – China (Beijing), Russia (Primorye)
- Micromorphus knowltoni Robinson, 1967 – United States
- Micromorphus leucostoma Robinson, 1967 – Washington
- Micromorphus limosorum (Vaillant, 1953) – Italy, Algeria
- Micromorphus lithophilus Robinson, 1967 – Mexico
- Micromorphus longilamellatus Robinson, 1964 – United States
- Micromorphus maraisi Grichanov, 2000 – Namibia
- Micromorphus mesasiaticus Negrobov, 2000 – Tajikistan
- Micromorphus micidus Parent, 1937 – Costa Rica, Guatemala
- Micromorphus minimus (Van Duzee, 1925) – Canada, United States
- Micromorphus minusculus Negrobov, 2000 – Tajikistan, Ukraine
- Micromorphus plebeius Parent, 1930 – Brazil
- Micromorphus rishikeshensis Grichanov, 2022 – India
- Micromorphus shamshevi Negrobov, 2000 – Ukraine
- Micromorphus spatulipes Parent, 1937 – Kenya, South Africa, Zimbabwe
- Micromorphus ugandensis Grichanov, 2013 – Uganda
- Micromorphus vegrandis (Frey, 1925) – Philippines

Species that may belong to other genera:

- Micromorphus ellampus Wei, 2006 – China (Guizhou)
- Micromorphus heterophalla Wei & Yang, 2007 – China (Guizhou)
- Micromorphus paludosus (Karl, 1921) (incertae sedis) – Poland
