= Cremmus =

Scientific classification
- Kingdom: Animalia
- Phylum: Arthropoda
- Class: Insecta
- Order: Diptera
- Family: Dolichopodidae
- Subfamily: Peloropeodinae
- Genus: Cremmus; Wei, 2006
- Species: C. fontanalis

Binomial name
- Cremmus fontanalis Wei, 2006

Genus of flies

Cremmus is a genus of flies in the family Dolichopodidae. It contains only one species, Cremmus fontanalis, known from China.
