= Navia breweri =

Scientific classification
- Kingdom: Plantae
- Clade: Tracheophytes
- Clade: Angiosperms
- Clade: Monocots
- Clade: Commelinids
- Order: Poales
- Family: Bromeliaceae
- Genus: Navia
- Species: N. breweri

Binomial name
- Navia breweri L.B.Sm. & Steyermark

Species of flowering plant

Navia breweri is a species of plant in the genus Navia. This species is endemic to Venezuela.
