= Microtes helferi =

Scientific classification
- Kingdom: Animalia
- Phylum: Arthropoda
- Clade: Pancrustacea
- Class: Insecta
- Order: Orthoptera
- Suborder: Caelifera
- Family: Acrididae
- Subfamily: Oedipodinae
- Tribe: Sphingonotini
- Genus: Microtes
- Species: M. helferi

Binomial name
- Microtes helferi (Strohecker, 1960)

Species of band-winged grasshopper

Microtes helferi is a species of band-winged grasshopper in the family Acrididae. It is found in western North America.
