= Orbivestus albocinerascens =

Scientific classification
- Kingdom: Plantae
- Clade: Tracheophytes
- Clade: Angiosperms
- Clade: Eudicots
- Clade: Asterids
- Order: Asterales
- Family: Asteraceae
- Genus: Orbivestus
- Species: O. albocinerascens

Binomial name
- Orbivestus albocinerascens (C.Jeffrey) Isawumi

Synonyms
- Vernonia albocinerascens C.Jeffrey

Species of plant in the daisy family

Orbivestus albocinerascens is a plant in the family Asteraceae, native to East Africa.

== Description ==
Orbivestus albocinerascens grows as a herb or shrub, measuring up to 4.5 metres (15 ft) tall. Its obovate leaves are pubescent and measure up to 4 cm (2 in) long. The capitula feature white flowers. The fruits are achenes.

== Distribution and habitat ==
Orbivestus albocinerascens is native to Kenya, Tanzania and Uganda. Its habitat is in bushlands and woodlands at altitudes of 500–2,050 m (1,600–6,700 ft).
