= Chrysotimus =

- Chrysotimus flaviventris

Scientific classification
- Kingdom: Animalia
- Phylum: Arthropoda
- Class: Insecta
- Order: Diptera
- Family: Dolichopodidae
- Subfamily: Peloropeodinae
- Genus: Chrysotimus; Loew, 1857

Type species
- Chrysotimus pusio Loew, 1861

Synonyms
- ?Guzeriplia Negrobov, 1968

Genus of flies

Chrysotimus is a genus of longlegged flies in the family Dolichopodidae. It is cosmopolitan in distribution, but it is probably paraphyletic with respect to several genera of limited distribution (such as Alishanimyia).

== Species ==
- Chrysotimus acutatus Wang, Yang & Grootaert, 2005
- Chrysotimus alacer Parent, 1932
- Chrysotimus alipes Parent, 1932
- Chrysotimus alumnus Parent, 1932
- Chrysotimus ambiguus Parent, 1932
- Chrysotimus amoenus Parent, 1932
- Chrysotimus ancistrus Yang, Saigusa & Masunaga, 2008
- Chrysotimus apicicurvatus Yang, 2002
- Chrysotimus arizonicus Robinson, 1967
- Chrysotimus basiflavus Yang, 2002
- Chrysotimus beijingensis (Yang & Saigusa, 2001)
- Chrysotimus bifascia Yang & Saigusa, 2005
- Chrysotimus bifurcatus Wang & Yang, 2006
- Chrysotimus bilineatus Parent, 1933
- Chrysotimus bispinus Yang & Saigusa, 2001
- Chrysotimus blandus Parent, 1934
- Chrysotimus calcaneatus Parent, 1932
- Chrysotimus chikuni Wang, Yang & Grootaert, 2005
- Chrysotimus confraternus Van Duzee, 1930
- Chrysotimus curvispinus Yang, Saigusa & Masunaga, 2008
- Chrysotimus dalongensis Wang, Chen & Yang, 2012
- Chrysotimus delicatus Loew, 1861
- Chrysotimus dichromatus (Bigot, 1890)
- Chrysotimus digitatus Yang & Saigusa, 2001
- Chrysotimus digitiformis Yang, Saigusa & Masunaga, 2008
- Chrysotimus dorsalis Yang, 2002
- Chrysotimus exilis (Philippi, 1865)
- Chrysotimus flavicornis Van Duzee, 1916
- Chrysotimus flavisetus Negrobov, 1978
- Chrysotimus flaviventris (Roser, 1840)
- Chrysotimus furcatus Yang, Saigusa & Masunaga, 2008
- Chrysotimus grandis Wang & Yang, 2006
- Chrysotimus guangdongensis Wang, Yang & Grootaert, 2005
- Chrysotimus guangxiensis Yang & Saigusa, 2001
- Chrysotimus huairouensis Wang, Chen & Yang, 2012
- Chrysotimus hubeiensis Wang, Chen & Yang, 2012
- Chrysotimus incisus Yang & Saigusa, 2001
- Chrysotimus javanensis Hollis, 1964
- Chrysotimus lii Wang & Yang, 2006
- Chrysotimus lijianganus Yang & Saigusa, 2001
- Chrysotimus linzhiensis Wang & Yang, 2006
- Chrysotimus lucens Parent, 1932
- Chrysotimus lunulatus Parent, 1933
- Chrysotimus luteolus Parent, 1932
- Chrysotimus luteopalpus Curran, 1923
- Chrysotimus luteus Curran, 1930
- Chrysotimus meridionalis Naglis & Bartak, 2015
- Chrysotimus metallicus Parent, 1934
- Chrysotimus molliculoides Parent, 1937
- Chrysotimus molliculus (Fallén, 1823)
- Chrysotimus motuoensis Wang, Chen & Yang, 2014
- Chrysotimus nepalensis Yang, Saigusa & Masunaga, 2008
- Chrysotimus nigrichaetus (Parent, 1933)
- Chrysotimus ningxianus Wang, Yang & Grootaert, 2005
- Chrysotimus obscurus Robinson, 1967
- Chrysotimus occdentalis (Harmston, 1951)
- Chrysotimus pingbianus Yang & Saigusa, 2001
- Chrysotimus pusio Loew, 1861
- Chrysotimus qinlingensis Yang & Saigusa, 2005
- Chrysotimus repertus Parent, 1932
- Chrysotimus sanjiangyuanus Wang, Yang & Grootaert, 2005
- Chrysotimus schildi Robinson, 1967
- Chrysotimus scutatus Parent, 1933
- Chrysotimus setosus Yang & Saigusa, 2005
- Chrysotimus shennonjianus Yang & Saigusa, 2001
- Chrysotimus sinensis Parent, 1944
- Chrysotimus songshanus Wang, Yang & Grootaert, 2005
- Chrysotimus spinuliferus Negrobov, 1978
- Chrysotimus sugonjaevi Negrobov, 1978
- Chrysotimus taiwanensis Wang, Chen & Yang, 2015
- Chrysotimus tibetensis Wang, Chen & Yang, 2014
- Chrysotimus unifascia Yang & Saigusa, 2005
- Chrysotimus varicoloris Becker, 1908
- Chrysotimus wuyishanensis Liu & Yang, 2024
- Chrysotimus xiaohuangshanus Wang, Yang & Grootaert, 2005
- Chrysotimus xiaolongmensis Zhang, Yang & Grootaert, 2003
- Chrysotimus xuae Wang, Yang & Grootaert, 2005
- Chrysotimus xuankuni Wang, Chen & Yang, 2014
- Chrysotimus yunlonganus Yang & Saigusa, 2001
- Chrysotimus zhui Wang, Chen & Yang, 2014

The following species are currently placed in Guzeriplia, if it is considered a separate genus:

- Chrysotimus beijingensis (Yang & Saigusa, 2001)
- Chrysotimus chlorinus (Negrobov, 1968)
- Chrysotimus viridanus (Negrobov, 1978)
