= Meuffelsia =

Scientific classification
- Kingdom: Animalia
- Phylum: Arthropoda
- Class: Insecta
- Order: Diptera
- Family: Dolichopodidae
- Subfamily: Peloropeodinae
- Genus: Meuffelsia; Grichanov, 2008

Type species
- Meuffelsia erasmusorum Grichanov, 2008

Genus of flies

Meuffelsia is a genus of flies in the family Dolichopodidae. It is named after Henk Meuffels, a Dutch researcher of the family. It is known from South Africa.

== Species ==
- Meuffelsia manningi Grichanov, 2008
- Meuffelsia erasmusorum Grichanov, 2008
