= Clibadium sodiroi =

Scientific classification
- Kingdom: Plantae
- Clade: Embryophytes
- Clade: Tracheophytes
- Clade: Spermatophytes
- Clade: Angiosperms
- Clade: Eudicots
- Clade: Asterids
- Order: Asterales
- Family: Asteraceae
- Tribe: Heliantheae
- Genus: Clibadium
- Species: C. sodiroi

Binomial name
- Clibadium sodiroi Hieron.

Synonyms
- Clibadium mexiae S.F.Blake, J. Washington Acad. Sci. 28: 489 (1938)

Species of flowering plant

Clibadium sodiroi, is a species of flowering plant in the family Asteraceae. It is native to Colombia and Ecuador. In Ecuador, its natural habitats are subtropical or tropical moist lowland forests and subtropical or tropical moist montane forests.

It was first published and described in Bot. Jahrb. Syst. 29: 32 in 1900.

The specific epithet of sodiroi refers to Luis Sodiro (1836–1909), who was an Italian Jesuit priest and a field botanist, who collected many plants in Ecuador.

== Conservation ==
Clibadium mexiae was assessed as "near threatened" in the 2003 IUCN Red List, where it is said to be native only to Ecuador. As of April 2023, C. mexiae was regarded as a synonym of Clibadium sodiroi, which is also found in Colombia.
