= Hadromerella =

Scientific classification
- Kingdom: Animalia
- Phylum: Arthropoda
- Class: Insecta
- Order: Diptera
- Family: Dolichopodidae
- Subfamily: Peloropeodinae
- Genus: Hadromerella; Meijere, 1916

Type species
- Hadromerella setosa Meijere, 1916

Genus of flies

Hadromerella is a genus of flies in the family Dolichopodidae. It contains two species known from Java in Indonesia.

== Species ==
- Hadromerella antennata Hollis, 1964
- Hadromerella setosa Meijere, 1916
