= Microtes occidentalis =

Scientific classification
- Kingdom: Animalia
- Phylum: Arthropoda
- Clade: Pancrustacea
- Class: Insecta
- Order: Orthoptera
- Suborder: Caelifera
- Family: Acrididae
- Genus: Microtes
- Species: M. occidentalis

Binomial name
- Microtes occidentalis (Bruner, 1893)

Synonyms
- Dissosteira planipennis Bruner, 1905; Microtes nubila Scudder, 1901; Scirtetica occidentalis Bruner, 1893

Species of grasshopper

Microtes occidentalis, the little buzzer grasshopper, is a species of band-winged grasshopper in the family Acrididae. It is found in North America. NatureServe considers it vulnerable. This species is endemic to the U.S. state of California. It is primarily found in Point Reyes National Seashore, Bodega Bay, and coastal areas of the Monterey Bay, where it can be found living in coastal dunes as its habitat. Likely also being adapted to feed on coastal adapted plants in its range. Individuals are stocky in shape (especially females) and grow to lengths of 17-26 millimeters in length, with males being smaller than females. Small 'hairs' can be visible on the bottom and sides of the body. Patterns and colorations are typically that of a speckled patterning mixed with colorations of browns, grays, whites, blacks, and beiges to camoflouge against sand and gravel. Adults are mainly active through the months from May to October, with eggs overwintering.
