= Navia robinsonii =

Scientific classification
- Kingdom: Plantae
- Clade: Tracheophytes
- Clade: Angiosperms
- Clade: Monocots
- Clade: Commelinids
- Order: Poales
- Family: Bromeliaceae
- Genus: Navia
- Species: N. robinsonii

Binomial name
- Navia robinsonii L.B.Sm,

Species of plant

Navia robinsonii is a plant species in the genus Navia.This species is endemic to Venezuela.
