= Microtes pogonata =

Scientific classification
- Domain: Eukaryota
- Kingdom: Animalia
- Phylum: Arthropoda
- Class: Insecta
- Order: Orthoptera
- Suborder: Caelifera
- Family: Acrididae
- Tribe: Sphingonotini
- Genus: Microtes
- Species: M. pogonata

Binomial name
- Microtes pogonata (Strohecker, 1963)

Species of grasshopper

Microtes pogonata is a species of band-winged grasshopper in the family Acrididae. It is found in North America.
