= Navia connata =

Scientific classification
- Kingdom: Plantae
- Clade: Tracheophytes
- Clade: Angiosperms
- Clade: Monocots
- Clade: Commelinids
- Order: Poales
- Family: Bromeliaceae
- Genus: Navia
- Species: N. connata

Binomial name
- Navia connata L.B. Smith & Steyermark

Species of flowering plant

Navia connata is a plant species in the genus Navia. This species is endemic to Venezuela.
