= Griphophanes =

Scientific classification
- Kingdom: Animalia
- Phylum: Arthropoda
- Class: Insecta
- Order: Diptera
- Family: Dolichopodidae
- Subfamily: Peloropeodinae
- Genus: Griphophanes; Grootaert & Meuffels, 1998

Type species
- Griphomyia gravicaudata Grootaert & Meuffels, 1997

Synonyms
- Griphomyia Grootaert & Meuffels, 1997 (nec Hardy, 1987)

Genus of flies

Griphophanes is a genus of flies in the family Dolichopodidae. It is known from Southeast Asia and the Democratic Republic of the Congo in Central Africa.

== Species ==
- Griphophanes cameroonensis Grichanov, 2022
- Griphophanes chaetifemoratus Naglis & Grootaert, 2012
- Griphophanes congoensis Grichanov, 2010
- Griphophanes conversus Naglis & Grootaert, 2012
- Griphophanes furcatulus Grootaert & Meuffels, 2012
- Griphophanes furcatus Grootaert & Meuffels, 2012
- Griphophanes garambaensis Grichanov, 2010
- Griphophanes gigantus Naglis & Grootaert, 2012
- Griphophanes gravicaudatus (Grootaert & Meuffels, 1997)
- Griphophanes longicornis Naglis & Grootaert, 2012
- Griphophanes magnus Naglis & Grootaert, 2012
- Griphophanes minimus Naglis & Grootaert, 2012
- Griphophanes minutulus Naglis & Grootaert, 2012
- Griphophanes obscurus Grootaert & Meuffels, 2012
- Griphophanes seriatus Naglis & Grootaert, 2012
- Griphophanes simplex Naglis & Grootaert, 2012
- Griphophanes spinosus Naglis & Grootaert, 2012
- Griphophanes tiomanensis Grootaert & Meuffels, 2012
