= Orbivestus bamendae =

Conservation status
- Vulnerable (IUCN 2.3)

Scientific classification
- Kingdom: Plantae
- Clade: Tracheophytes
- Clade: Angiosperms
- Clade: Eudicots
- Clade: Asterids
- Order: Asterales
- Family: Asteraceae
- Genus: Orbivestus
- Species: O. bamendae

Binomial name
- Orbivestus bamendae (C.D.Adams) Isawumi

Synonyms
- Vernonia bamendae C.D.Adams

Species of flowering plant

Orbivestus bamendae is a plant in the family Asteraceae.

== Description ==
Orbivestus bamendae grows as a herb, measuring up to 5 metres (16 ft) tall. The leaves are sessile. The inflorescences feature purple florets.

== Distribution and habitat ==
Orbivestus bamendae is native to Cameroon's Bamenda Highlands and their continuation as Nigeria's Mambilla Plateau. The species' range is considered to be very small. Its habitat is grassy slopes at altitudes of 1,500–2,500 m (5,000–8,000 ft).
