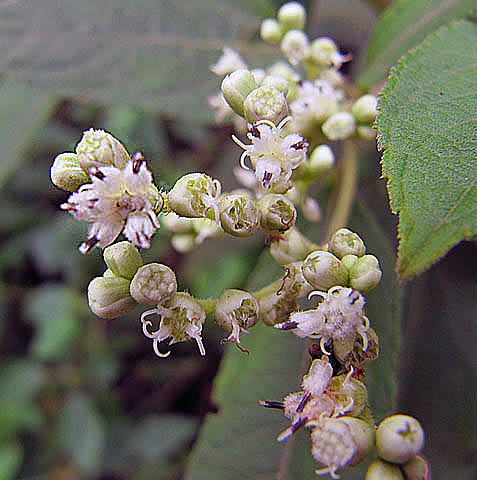
- Clibadium leiocarpum

Scientific classification
- Kingdom: Plantae
- Clade: Tracheophytes
- Clade: Angiosperms
- Clade: Eudicots
- Clade: Asterids
- Order: Asterales
- Family: Asteraceae
- Subfamily: Asteroideae
- Tribe: Heliantheae
- Subtribe: Ecliptinae
- Genus: Clibadium; F.Allam. ex L.

Synonyms
- Oswalda Cass.; Baillieria Aubl.; Orsinia Bertol. ex DC.; Ballieria Juss.; Trixis Sw.; Trichapium Gilli; Oswaldia Cass.; Oswaldia Less.

= Clibadium =

Genus of flowering plants

Clibadium is a genus of flowering plants in the family Asteraceae.

Species accepted by the Plants of the World Online as of December 2022:

- Clibadium acuminatum Benth.
- Clibadium anceps Greenm.
- Clibadium arboreum Donn.Sm.
- Clibadium armanii (Balb.) Sch.Bip. ex O.E.Schulz
- Clibadium arriagadae Pruski
- Clibadium congestum Cuatrec.
- Clibadium cordatum Cuatrec.
- Clibadium divaricatum S.F.Blake
- Clibadium eggersii Hieron.
- Clibadium erosum (Sw.) DC.
- Clibadium frontinoense S.Díaz & Arriagada
- Clibadium glabrescens S.F.Blake
- Clibadium glomeratum Greenm.
- Clibadium grandifolium S.F.Blake
- Clibadium harlingii H.Rob.
- Clibadium laxum S.F.Blake
- Clibadium leiocarpum Steetz
- Clibadium leptophyllum Cuatrec.
- Clibadium manabiense H.Rob.
- Clibadium micranthum O.E.Schulz
- Clibadium microcephalum S.F.Blake
- Clibadium pastazense Domke
- Clibadium pentaneuron S.F.Blake
- Clibadium peruvianum Poepp. ex DC.
- Clibadium pileorubrum Cuatrec.
- Clibadium remotiflorum O.E.Schulz
- Clibadium rhytidophyllum Diels
- Clibadium scandens Cuatrec.
- Clibadium sessile S.F.Blake
- Clibadium sodiroi Hieron.
- Clibadium sprucei S.F.Blake
- Clibadium subsessilifolium Hieron.
- Clibadium surinamense L.
- Clibadium sylvestre (Aubl.) Baill.
- Clibadium terebinthinaceum (Sw.) DC.
- Clibadium trianae (Hieron.) S.F.Blake
- Clibadium websteri H.Rob.
- Clibadium zarucchii H.Rob.
