= Navia duidae =

Scientific classification
- Kingdom: Plantae
- Clade: Tracheophytes
- Clade: Angiosperms
- Clade: Monocots
- Clade: Commelinids
- Order: Poales
- Family: Bromeliaceae
- Genus: Navia
- Species: N. duidae

Binomial name
- Navia duidae L.B.Sm.

Species of flowering plant

Navia duidae is a plant species in the genus Navia. This species is endemic to Cerro Duida, a mountain in Amazonas, Venezuela. It was discovered by Julian Steyermark, who also found a smooth variety at a slightly lower elevation called N. duidae var. glabrior.
