= Notobothrus =

Scientific classification
- Kingdom: Animalia
- Phylum: Arthropoda
- Clade: Pancrustacea
- Class: Insecta
- Order: Diptera
- Family: Dolichopodidae
- Subfamily: incertae sedis
- Genus: Notobothrus; Parent, 1931
- Species: N. longilamellatus

Binomial name
- Notobothrus longilamellatus Parent, 1931

Genus of flies

Notobothrus is a genus of flies in the family Dolichopodidae. It contains only one species, Notobothrus longilamellatus, which is known from the lowland Amazonian Peru and northwestern Brazilian Acre State. It was formerly placed in the subfamily Neurigoninae, but was moved to Peloropeodinae by Naglis in 2002. In 2020, the genus was excluded from the Peloropeodinae and provisionally left incertae sedis within Dolichopodidae.
