= Navia phelpsiae =

Scientific classification
- Kingdom: Plantae
- Clade: Tracheophytes
- Clade: Angiosperms
- Clade: Monocots
- Clade: Commelinids
- Order: Poales
- Family: Bromeliaceae
- Genus: Navia
- Species: N. phelpsiae

Binomial name
- Navia phelpsiae L.B.Sm.

Species of flowering plant

Navia phelpsiae is a plant species in the genus Navia. The species is endemic to Venezuela.
