= Chrysotimus delicatus =

Scientific classification
- Domain: Eukaryota
- Kingdom: Animalia
- Phylum: Arthropoda
- Class: Insecta
- Order: Diptera
- Family: Dolichopodidae
- Genus: Chrysotimus
- Species: C. delicatus

Binomial name
- Chrysotimus delicatus Loew, 1861

Species of fly

Chrysotimus delicatus is a species of longlegged fly in the family Dolichopodidae.
