= Guzeriplia =

Scientific classification
- Kingdom: Animalia
- Phylum: Arthropoda
- Class: Insecta
- Order: Diptera
- Family: Dolichopodidae
- Subfamily: Peloropeodinae
- Genus: Guzeriplia; Negrobov, 1968

Type species
- Guzeriplia chlorina Negrobov, 1968

Genus of flies

Guzeriplia is a genus of flies in the family Dolichopodidae. It is known from southern Russia, Georgia, China and Turkey. It is considered a synonym of Chrysotimus by some authors, but is considered a separate genus by others.

== Species ==
Four species are included in the genus:

- Guzeriplia beijingensis Yang & Saigusa, 2001 – China: Beijing
- Guzeriplia chlorina Negrobov, 1968 – Georgia, Russia (southern European part, Caucasus: Adygea, North Ossetia-Alania, Kabardino-Balkaria, Karachay-Cherkessia, Krasnodar Territory, Stavropol Territory), Turkey
- Guzeriplia turcica Naglis & Negrobov, 2021 – Turkey
- Guzeriplia viridana Negrobov, 1978 – Russia (southern European part, Caucasus: Adygea, Karachay-Cherkessia, Krasnodar Territory)
