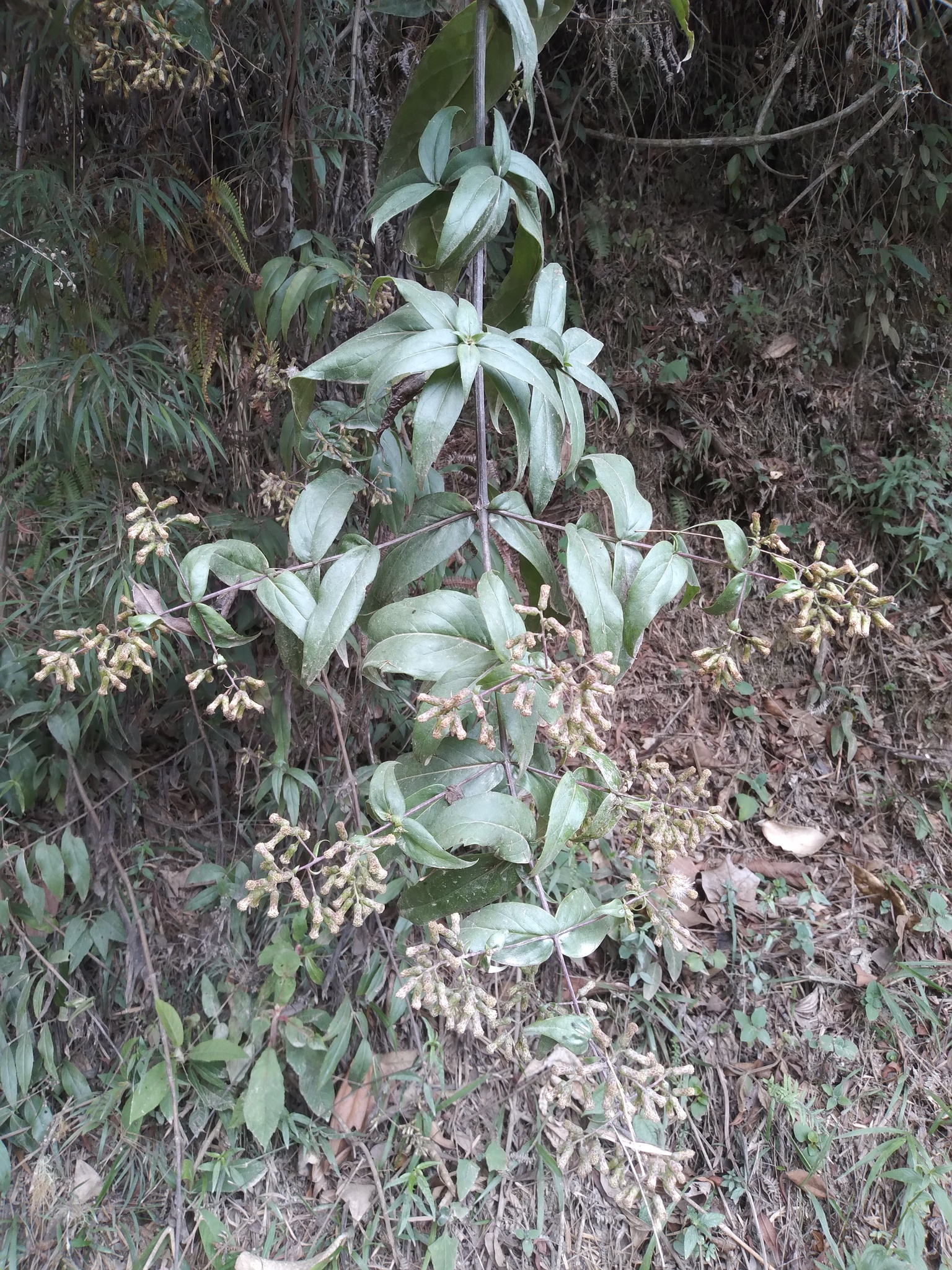
- Ayapanopsis beckii

Scientific classification
- Kingdom: Plantae
- Clade: Embryophytes
- Clade: Tracheophytes
- Clade: Spermatophytes
- Clade: Angiosperms
- Clade: Eudicots
- Clade: Asterids
- Order: Asterales
- Family: Asteraceae
- Subfamily: Asteroideae
- Tribe: Eupatorieae
- Genus: Ayapanopsis; R.M.King & H.Rob.

Synonyms
- Bolbostylis Gardner; Biasolettia Pohl ex Baker

= Ayapanopsis =

Genus of flowering plants

Ayapanopsis is a genus of flowering plants in the family Asteraceae. Species of the genus Ayapanopsis are native to the Andes of South America, from southern Colombia to Argentina.

Species

- Ayapanopsis adenophora R.M.King & H.Rob.
- Ayapanopsis andina (B.L.Rob.) R.M.King & H.Rob.
- Ayapanopsis beckii H.Rob.
- Ayapanopsis cuchabensis (B.L.Rob.) R.M.King & H.Rob.
- Ayapanopsis didyma (Klatt) R.M.King & H.Rob.
- Ayapanopsis esperanzae (Hassl.) R.M.King & H.Rob.
- Ayapanopsis euphyes (B.L.Rob.) R.M.King & H.Rob.
- Ayapanopsis ferreyrae R.M.King & H.Rob.
- Ayapanopsis ferreyrii R.M.King & H.Rob.
- Ayapanopsis latipaniculata (Rusby) R.M.King & H.Rob.
- Ayapanopsis luteynii H.Rob. & Pruski
- Ayapanopsis mathewsii (B.L.Rob.) R.M.King & H.Rob.
- Ayapanopsis oblongifolia (Gardner) R.M.King & H.Rob.
- Ayapanopsis tarapotensis (B.L.Rob.) R.M.King & H.Rob.
- Ayapanopsis thermarum (B.L.Rob.) H.Rob.
- Ayapanopsis triosteifolia (Rusby) R.M.King & H.Rob.
- Ayapanopsis tucumanensis (Lillo & B.L.Rob.) R.M.King & H.Rob.
- Ayapanopsis vargasii R.M.King & H.Rob.
- Ayapanopsis wurdackiana H.Rob.
- Ayapanopsis wurdackii H.Rob.
