= Alishanimyia =

Scientific classification
- Kingdom: Animalia
- Phylum: Arthropoda
- Class: Insecta
- Order: Diptera
- Family: Dolichopodidae
- Subfamily: Peloropeodinae
- Genus: Alishanimyia; Bickel, 2007
- Species: A. elmohardyi

Binomial name
- Alishanimyia elmohardyi (Bickel, 2004)

Synonyms
- Genus: Alishania Bickel, 2004 (nec Vilbaste, 1969); Species: Alishania elmohardyi Bickel, 2004

Genus of flies

Alishanimyia is a genus of fly in the family Dolichopodidae. It contains only one species, Alishanimyia elmohardyi, and is known only from montane forests at 2400 m in Taiwan. Alishanimyia is probably descended from Chrysotimus, which would make the latter genus paraphyletic.

The genus was originally named Alishania by Daniel J. Bickel in 2004, named after Alishan, a locality in Taiwan where all specimens of the species were collected; however, this name was preoccupied by Alishania Vilbaste, 1969, so it was renamed to Alishanimyia by Bickel in 2007.

The specific name, elmohardyi, was named in memory of D. Elmo Hardy.
