= Clibadium subsessilifolium =

Conservation status
- Data Deficient (IUCN 3.1)

Scientific classification
- Kingdom: Plantae
- Clade: Tracheophytes
- Clade: Angiosperms
- Clade: Eudicots
- Clade: Asterids
- Order: Asterales
- Family: Asteraceae
- Tribe: Heliantheae
- Genus: Clibadium
- Species: C. subsessilifolium

Binomial name
- Clibadium subsessilifolium Hieron.

Species of flowering plant

Clibadium subsessilifolium is a species of flowering plant in the family Asteraceae. It is found only in Ecuador.
