= Microtes =

Scientific classification
- Domain: Eukaryota
- Kingdom: Animalia
- Phylum: Arthropoda
- Class: Insecta
- Order: Orthoptera
- Suborder: Caelifera
- Family: Acrididae
- Subfamily: Oedipodinae
- Tribe: Sphingonotini
- Genus: Microtes; Scudder, 1900

Genus of grasshoppers

Microtes is a genus of North American band-winged grasshoppers in the family Acrididae, and has at least 3 described species in Microtes.

== Species ==
- Microtes helferi (Strohecker, 1960)
- Microtes occidentalis (Bruner, 1893) (little buzzer grasshopper)
- Microtes pogonata (Strohecker, 1963)
