= Navia pauciflora =

Scientific classification
- Kingdom: Plantae
- Clade: Tracheophytes
- Clade: Angiosperms
- Clade: Monocots
- Clade: Commelinids
- Order: Poales
- Family: Bromeliaceae
- Genus: Navia
- Species: N. pauciflora

Binomial name
- Navia pauciflora L.B.Sm.

Synonyms
- Navia albiflora

Species of flowering plant

Navia pauciflora is a plant species in the genus Navia. This species is endemic to Venezuela. The specific epithet pauciflora is Latin for 'few-flowered'.
