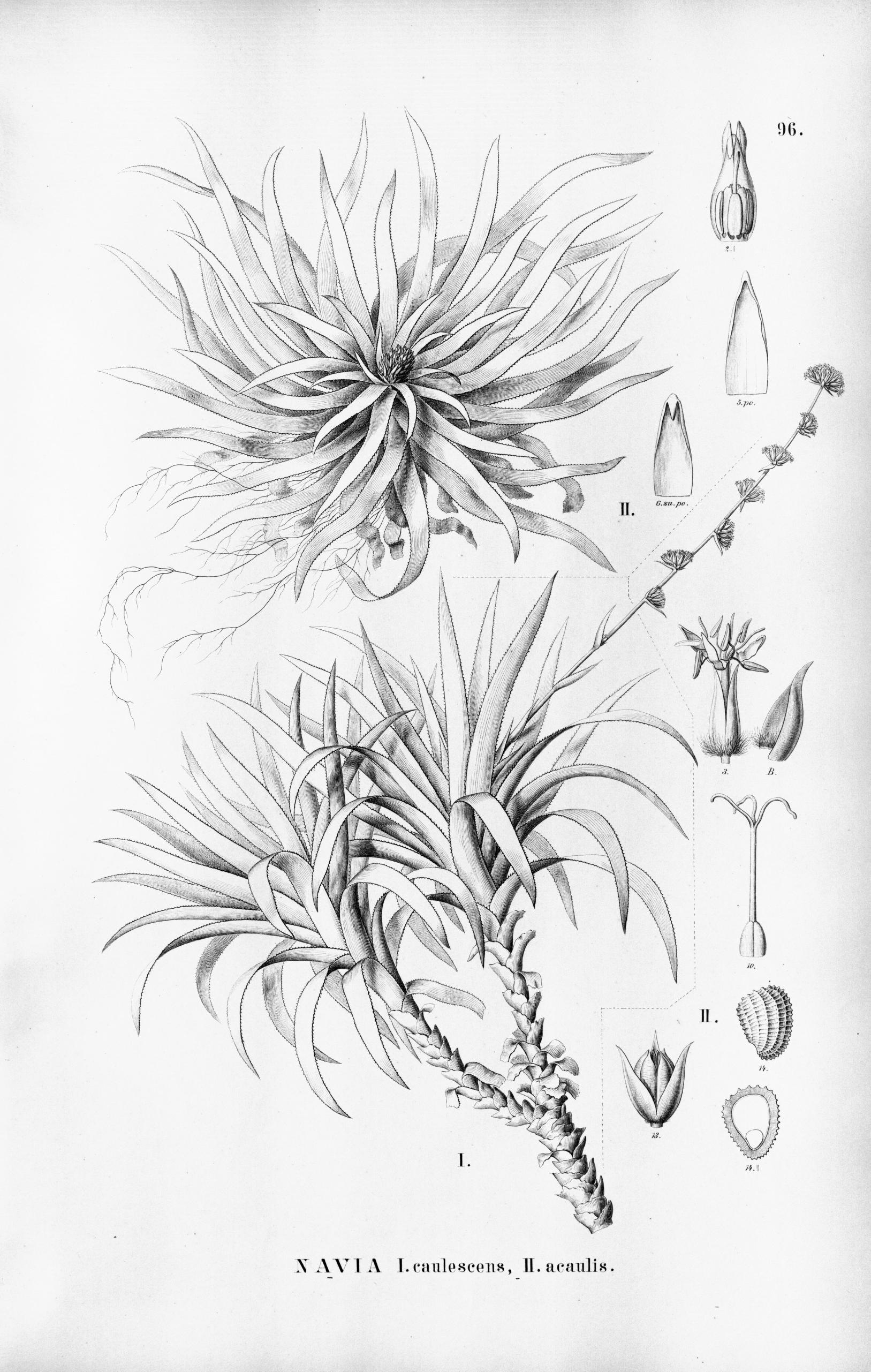
- Navia caulescens

Scientific classification
- Kingdom: Plantae
- Clade: Embryophytes
- Clade: Tracheophytes
- Clade: Spermatophytes
- Clade: Angiosperms
- Clade: Monocots
- Clade: Commelinids
- Order: Poales
- Family: Bromeliaceae
- Subfamily: Navioideae
- Genus: Navia; Schult. & Schult.f.

Synonyms
- Brewcaria L.B.Sm., Steyerm. & H.Rob.

= Navia (plant) =

Genus of flowering plants

Navia is a genus of plants in the family Bromeliaceae, containing about 100 species. Described as early as 1830 in Guyana, they are commonly cultivated for their colorful foliage and inflorescences. All the species are native to northern South America (Guyana, Suriname, Venezuela, Colombia, northern Brazil).

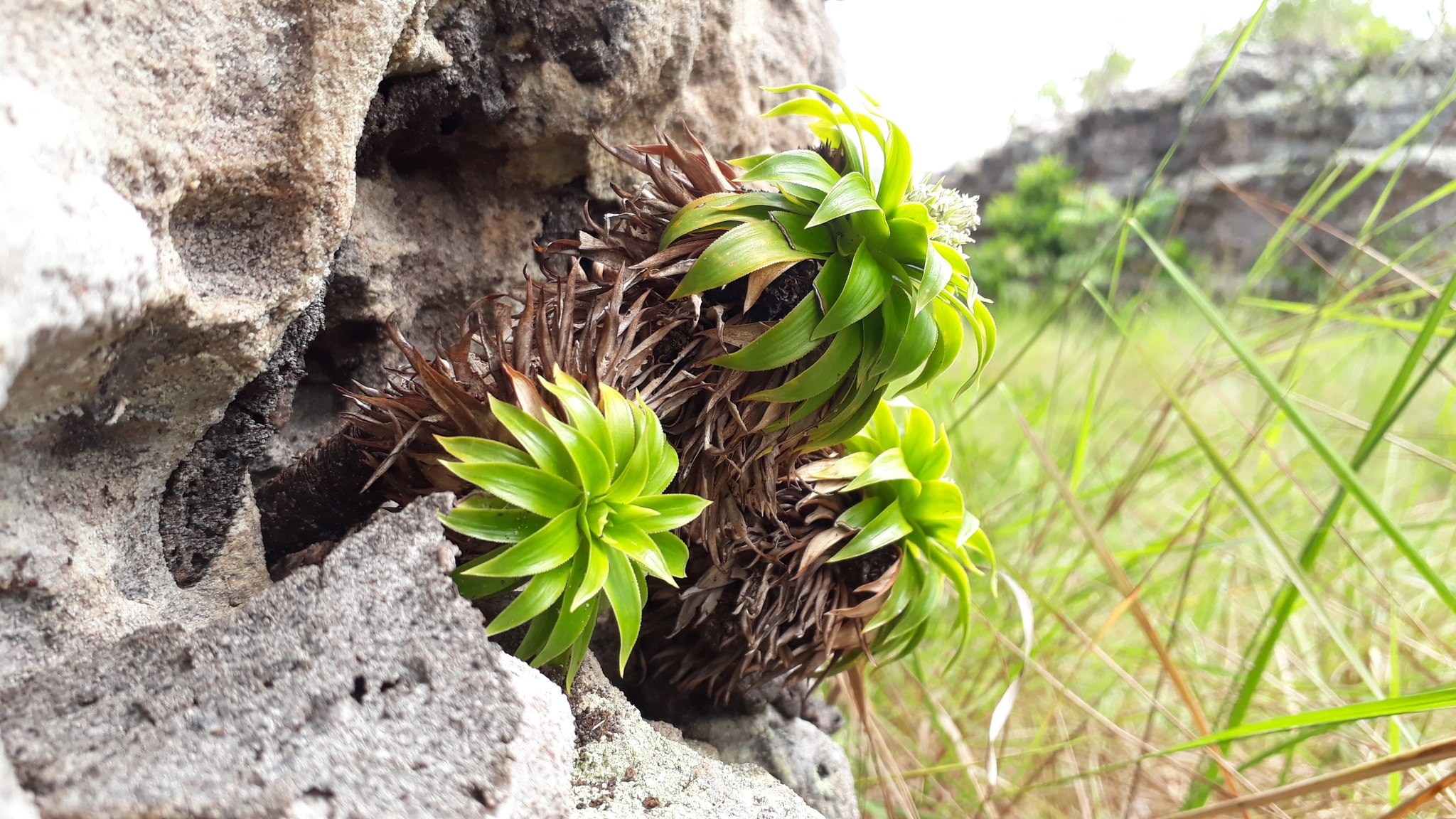
Navia acaulis

== Species ==
As of July 2026, Plants of the World Online accepted these species:

- Navia abysmophila L.B. Smith – Amazonas State in Venezuela
- Navia acaulis Martius ex Schult. & Schult.f. – Colombia
- Navia affinis L.B. Smith – Amazonas State in Venezuela
- Navia aliciae L.B. Smith, Steyermark & Robinson – Amazonas State in Venezuela
- Navia aloifolia L.B. Smith – Amazonas State in Venezuela
- Navia angustifolia (Baker) Mez – Guyana
- Navia arida L.B. Smith & Steyermark – Venezuela, Guyana
- Navia aurea L.B. Smith – Amazonas State in Venezuela
- Navia axillaris Betancur – Colombia
- Navia barbellata L.B. Smith – Guyana
- Navia berryana L.B. Smith, Steyermark & Robinson – Amazonas State in Venezuela
- Navia bicolor L.B. Smith – Colombia
- Navia brachyphylla L.B. Smith – Amazonas State in Venezuela
- Navia breweri L.B. Smith & Steyermark – Bolívar State in Venezuela
- Navia brocchinioides L.B.Sm. – Amazonas State in Venezuela
- Navia cardonae L.B. Smith – Bolívar State in Venezuela
- Navia caricifolia L.B. Smith – Amazonas State in Venezuela
- Navia carnevalii L.B. Smith & Steyermark – Amazonas State in Venezuela
- Navia caulescens Martius ex Schult. & Schult.f. – Colombia
- Navia caurensis L.B. Smith – Bolívar State in Venezuela
- Navia colorata L.B. Smith – Amazonas State in Venezuela
- Navia connata L.B. Smith & Steyermark – Bolívar State in Venezuela
- Navia corrugata Barb.Silva & Martinelli – Amazonas State in Brazil
- Navia crassicaulis L.B. Smith, Steyermark & Robinson – Amazonas State in Venezuela
- Navia cretacea L.B. Smith – Amazonas State in Venezuela
- Navia crispa L.B. Smith – Venezuela
- Navia cucullata L.B. Smith – Bolívar State in Venezuela
- Navia culcitaria L.B. Smith, Steyermark & Robinson – Amazonas State in Venezuela
- Navia duidae L.B. Smith – Amazonas State in Venezuela
- Navia duidensis (L.B.Sm., Steyerm. & H.Rob.) Christenh. & Byng – Amazonas State in Venezuela
- Navia ebracteata Betancur & Arbeláez – Colombia
- Navia eldorado Barb.Silva & Forzza – Amazonas State in Brazil
- Navia emergens L.B. Smith, Steyermark & Robinson – Bolívar State in Venezuela
- Navia filifera L.B. Smith, Steyermark & Robinson – Amazonas State in Venezuela
- Navia fontoides L.B. Smith – Colombia
- Navia geaster L.B. Smith, Steyermark & Robinson – Bolívar State in Venezuela
- Navia glandulifera B. Holst – Bolívar State in Venezuela
- Navia glauca L.B. Smith – Amazonas State in Venezuela
- Navia gleasonii L.B. Smith – Guyana, Amazonas State in Venezuela
- Navia graminifolia L.B. Smith – Colombia
- Navia hechtioides L.B.Sm. – Amazonas State in Venezuela
- Navia heliophila L.B. Smith – Colombia
- Navia hohenbergioides L.B.Sm. – Amazonas State in Venezuela
- Navia huberiana L.B. Smith, Steyermark & Robinson – Amazonas State in Venezuela
- Navia igneosicola L.B.Sm., Steyerm. & H.Rob. – Amazonas State in Venezuela
- Navia immersa L.B. Smith – Amazonas State in Venezuela
- Navia incrassata L.B. Smith & Steyermark – Bolívar State in Venezuela
- Navia intermedia L.B. Smith & Steyermark – Bolívar State in Venezuela
- Navia involucrata L.B. Smith – Amazonas State in Venezuela
- Navia jauana L.B. Smith, Steyermark & Robinson – Bolívar State in Venezuela
- Navia lactea L.B. Smith, Steyermark & Robinson – Amazonas State in Venezuela
- Navia lanigera L.B. Smith – Amazonas State in Venezuela
- Navia lasiantha L.B. Smith & Steyermark – Bolívar State in Venezuela
- Navia latifolia L.B. Smith – Amazonas State in Venezuela
- Navia lepidota L.B. Smith – Amazonas State in Venezuela
- Navia liesneri L.B. Smith, Steyermark & Robinson – Amazonas State in Venezuela
- Navia lindmanioides L.B. Smith – Amazonas State in Venezuela
- Navia linearis L.B. Smith, Steyermark & Robinson – Amazonas State in Venezuela
- Navia luzuloides L.B. Smith, Steyermark & Robinson – Bolívar State in Venezuela
- Navia maguirei L.B. Smith – Suriname
- Navia marahuacae (L.B.Sm., Steyerm. & H.Rob.) Christenh. & Byng – Amazonas State in Venezuela
- Navia mima L.B. Smith – Amazonas State in Venezuela
- Navia mosaica B. Holst – Amazonas State in Venezuela
- Navia myriantha L.B. Smith – Amazonas State in Brazil
- Navia navicularis L.B. Smith & Steyermark – Bolívar State in Venezuela
- Navia nubicola L.B. Smith – Amazonas State in Venezuela
- Navia ocellata L.B. Smith – Amazonas State in Venezuela
- Navia octopoides L.B. Smith – Amazonas State in Venezuela
- Navia ovoidea L.B. Smith, Steyermark & Robinson – Bolívar State in Venezuela
- Navia paruana B. Holst – Amazonas State in Venezuela
- Navia parvula L.B. Smith – Amazonas State in Venezuela
- Navia patria L.B. Smith & Steyermark – Amazonas State in Venezuela
- Navia pauciflora L.B. Smith – Amazonas State in Venezuela
- Navia phelpsiae L.B. Smith – Amazonas State in Venezuela
- Navia pilarica Betancur – Colombia
- Navia piresii L.B. Smith, Steyermark & Robinson – Amazonas State in Brazil
- Navia polyglomerata L.B. Smith, Steyermark & Robinson – Amazonas State in Venezuela
- Navia pulvinata L.B. Smith – Amazonas State in Venezuela
- Navia pungens L.B. Smith – Amazonas State in Venezuela
- Navia reflexa L.B.Sm. – Colombia, Amazonas State in Venezuela
- Navia robinsonii L.B. Smith – Bolívar State in Venezuela
- Navia sandwithii L.B. Smith – Guyana
- Navia saxicola L.B. Smith – Amazonas State in Venezuela
- Navia schultesiana L.B. Smith – Colombia
- Navia scirpiflora L.B. Smith, Steyermark & Robinson – Bolívar State in Venezuela
- Navia scopulorum L.B. Smith – Venezuela
- Navia semiserrata L.B. Smith – Amazonas State in Venezuela
- Navia serrulata L.B. Smith – Amazonas State in Venezuela
- Navia splendens L.B. Smith – Amazonas State in Venezuela, Guyana
- Navia stenodonta L.B. Smith – Amazonas State in Venezuela
- Navia steyermarkii L.B. Smith – Amazonas State in Venezuela
- Navia subpetiolata L.B. Smith – Amazonas State in Venezuela
- Navia tentaculata B. Holst – Bolívar State in Venezuela
- Navia tenuifolia Barb.Silva & Forzza – Amazonas State in Brazil
- Navia terramarae L.B. Smith & Steyermark – Amazonas State in Venezuela
- Navia trichodonta L.B. Smith – Amazonas State in Venezuela
- Navia umbratilis L.B. Smith – Amazonas State in Venezuela
- Navia viridis L.B. Smith – Amazonas State in Venezuela
- Navia wurdackii L.B. Smith – Bolívar State in Venezuela
- Navia xyridiflora L.B. Smith – Amazonas State in Venezuela
