= Haroldia mendocina =

Scientific classification
- Kingdom: Plantae
- Clade: Tracheophytes
- Clade: Angiosperms
- Clade: Eudicots
- Clade: Asterids
- Order: Asterales
- Family: Asteraceae
- Subfamily: Asteroideae
- Tribe: Astereae
- Subtribe: Chiliotrichinae
- Genus: Haroldia; Bonif.
- Species: H. mendocina

Binomial name
- Haroldia mendocina (Cabrera) Bonif.

Genus of flowering plants

Haroldia is a genus of flowering plants belonging to the family Asteraceae. It contains a single species, Haroldia mendocina.

Its native range is north-western Argentina.

Both the genus and the species were circumscribed by José M. Bonifacino in Smithsonian Contr. Bot. vol.92 on page 50 in 2009.

The genus name of Haroldia is in honour of Harold Ernest Robinson (1932–2020), who was an American botanist and entomologist.
