= Fedtshenkomyia =

Scientific classification
- Kingdom: Animalia
- Phylum: Arthropoda
- Class: Insecta
- Order: Diptera
- Family: Dolichopodidae
- Subfamily: Peloropeodinae
- Genus: Fedtshenkomyia; Stackelberg, 1927
- Species: F. chrysotymoides

Binomial name
- Fedtshenkomyia chrysotymoides Stackelberg, 1927

Genus of flies

Fedtshenkomyia is a genus of flies in the family Dolichopodidae. It contains only one species, Fedtshenkomyia chrysotymoides, known from Central Asia. The genus and species were formally described by Aleksandr Stackelberg in 1927, from two males and a female that were collected by Alexei Fedchenko in 1869 from the Yaghnob Valley in what was then Russian Turkestan.
