= Harold E. Robinson =

American botanist and entomologist (1932–2020)

Harold E Robinson
- Born: May 22, 1932; Syracuse, New York, U.S.
- Died: December 17, 2020 (aged 88)
- Education: Ohio University, University of Tennessee, Duke University
- Awards: Asa Gray Award
- Scientific career
- Fields: Botany; Entomology
- Workplaces: Smithsonian Institution

Harold Ernest Robinson (May 22, 1932 – December 17, 2020) was an American botanist and entomologist.

== Career ==
Robinson's specialty was the sunflower family (Asteraceae) and the bryophytes. He has named or described over 2,800 new species and subtribes, more than one tenth of the number of species in the Asteraceae. This figure is also about one quarter of the number of flowering plants described by Carl Linnaeus.

Robinson wrote over 650 publications, mainly on the Asteraceae, mosses (Bryophyta), Marchantiophyta, and the long-legged fly family Dolichopodidae (describing over 200 new species and 6 new genera, such as Harmstonia and Nanomyina) and many other subjects.

He received a B.S. from Ohio University in 1955, an M.S. from the University of Tennessee in 1957, a Ph.D. from Duke University in 1960.

From 1960 to 1962 as assistant professor at Wofford College (Spartanburg, South Carolina), he became Associate Curator of lower plants at the Smithsonian Institution, Washington (1960–1962). Later he was appointed Associate Curator (1964–1971) and finally Curator of Botany from 1971.

== Research ==
Robinson, together with collaborators, investigated the taxonomy of several bryophytes, green algae (co-naming a new genus Struveopsis), and vines of family Hippocrateaceae (now a synonym of the staff vine family Celastraceae). He made a study of the phylogeny of the genus Houstonia of the madder family.

Robinson's major interest went to the sunflower family (Asteraceae). In the neotropical tribe Eupatorieae, Robinson (with co-worker King) has named at least one species in 27 of the genera. He later worked on the reorganization of the tribes Senecioneae, Heliantheae, Liabeae, and Vernonieae. Robinson has made a detailed study of the many secondary metabolite chemicals found in the Eupatorieae tribe, such as alkaloids, (poly)acetylenes, and terpenoids (see Ichthyothere), together with Robert Merrill King and Ferdinand Bohlmann. This resulted in a large number of publications mostly in the journal Phytochemistry in the 1970s and 1980s.

In 1970 Robinson and King stressed the need for diagnostic character analysis in his classic article entitled The New Synantherology.

In 1974 Robinson named a new subtribe Luziolinae of oryzoid (= rice-like) grasses Poaceae, but this was not supported by molecular study. Robinson also named the small genus Synanthes of epiphytic orchids from Paraguay, as well as named 32 new species from the bromeliad family. These were mostly in the genera Navia and Lindmania, Connellia, and Cottendorfia, such as Navia albiflora and Navia aliciae. In 1999 he merged Pepinia into Pitcairnia at generic level. He made several illustrations for the Catalog of Botanical Illustrations, Smithsonian Institution, such as for Brewcaria duidensis.

In 1986 Robinson gave a critical but constructive opinion on cladistics in the article. "A Key to the Common Errors of Cladistics".

== Awards and legacy ==
In 2010, Robinson received the Asa Gray Award, the highest honour of the American Society of Plant Taxonomists.

In 1996, the plant genus Robinsonecio (in the family Asteraceae) from Mexico and Guatemala, and then Haroldia, which is a genus of flowering plants belonging to the family Asteraceae, was published in 2009, were both named in his honour.

== Selected works ==
- Rhyne, C. and H. Robinson. 1968. Struveopsis, a new genus of green algae. Phytologia 17:467-472
- Robinson, H. 1969, A Monograph of Foliar Anatomy of the Genera Connellia, Cottendorfia and Navia (Bromeliaceae). Washington..
- King, R. M., & H. Robinson. 1970. The new synantherology. Taxon 19:6-11.
- King, R. M., and H. Robinson. 1970 : Eupatorium, a composite genus of Arcto-Tertiary distribution. Taxon 19: 769–774.
- King, R. M., and H. Robinson 1970 : Studies in the Eupatorieae (Compositae). XXV. A new genus Eupatoriadelphus. Phytologia 19: 431–432.
- King, R. M., & H. Robinson. 1970. New combinations in Ageratina. Phytologia 19:208-229.
- Reed, C. F. and H. Robinson. 1971. Bryophytes of Monteverde, Costa Rica. Phytologia 21: 6-21.
- Terrell E. E., H. Robinson, 1974 Luziolinae, a new subtribe of oryzoid grasses. Bulletin of the Torrey Botanical Club 101: 235-235[ISI]
- King, R. M. & H. Robinson. 1975.- Studies in the Eupatorieae (Asteraceae), CXXXIX. A new genus, Aristeguietia. - Phytologia 30: 217–220.
- Robinson H., 1978 Studies in the Heliantheae (Asteraceae). XII. Re-establishment of the genus Smallanthus. Phytologia 39: 47-47
- Robinson H.,: 1978 - . Compositae-Liabeae. 1978. 63 pp. Flora of Ecuador volume 8
- Robinson H., 1980 Studies in the Heliantheae (Asteraceae). XXVI. New species of Ichthyothere. Phytologia 47: 128-128
- Robinson H., 1981 A revision of the tribal and subtribal limits of the Heliantheae (Asteraceae). Smithsonian Contributions to Botany 51: 1-1
- Robinson H., A. M. Powell, R. M. King, J. F. Weedin, 1981 Chromosome numbers in Compositae. XII. Heliantheae. Smithsonian Contribributions to Botany 52: 1-1
- Bohlmann, F., Zdero, C., Grenz, M., Dhar, A.K., Robinson, H., King, R.M.. "Naturally occurring terpene derivatives .307. 5 diterpene and other constituents from 9 Baccharis species." - Phytochemistry 20 281 - 286, 1981.
- Robinson H., 1983 Studies in the Heliantheae (Asteraceae). XXX. A new species of Ichthyothere from Cayenne. Phytologia 53: 388-388
- Robinson, Harold Ernest (1983). "A generic review of the tribe Liabeae (Asteraceae)". Smithsonian Contributions to Botany (54). Smithsonian Institution Press: 69 pages.
- Terrell, E.E., W.H. Lewis, H. Robinson, and J.W. Nowicke. 1986. Phylogenetic implications of diverse seed types, chromosome numbers, and pollen morphology in Houstonia (Rubiaceae) Am. J. Bot. 73:103-115.
- King, R.M. & Robinson, H. 1987. The genera of the Eupatorieae (Asteraceae). Monographs in systematic botany from the Missouri Botanical Garden 22: 1–581.
- Robinson, H. 1993. A review of the genus Critoniopsis in Central and South America (Vernonieae: Asteraceae) Proc. Biol. Soc. Wash. 106: 606–627.
- Robinson, H. 1993. Three new genera of Vernonieae from South America, Dasyandantha, Dasyanthina, and Quechualia. Proc. Biol. Soc. Wash. 106(4): 775–785.
- Robinson, H., & J. Cuatrecasas. 1993. New species of Pentacalia (Senecioneae: Asteraceae) from Ecuador, Peru, and Bolivia. Novon 3(3): 284–301.
- Robinson, H. 1994. Cololobus, Pseudopiptocarpha, and Trepadonia, three new genera from South America (Vernonieae: Asteraceae). Proc. Biol. Soc. Wash. 107(3): 557–568.
- Robinson, H. 1994. New combination in American Vernonieae (Asteraceae). Phytologia 76: 27–29.
- Robinson, H. 1995. New combinations and new species in American Vernonieae (Asteraceae). Phytologia 78(5): 384–399.
- Robinson, H. 1995. Two new species of Ichthyothere (Heliantheae: Asteraceae) from Ecuador and Peru. Sida 16(4): 731–736.
- Robinson, H. & V. Funk. 1995. Compositae of Ecuador I: Key to frequently collected genera. In: R. Valencia & H. Balslev (eds.) Estudios sobre diversidad y ecología de plantas, p. 65-75. PUCE, Quito.
- Robinson, H. 1997. New species of Aphanactis in Ecuador and Bolivia and new combinations in Selloa (Heliantheae: Asteraceae). Brittonia 49(1): 71–78.
- Robinson, H. 1997. New species of Aphanactis, Calea, Clibadium and Tridax (Heliantheae, Asteraceae) from Ecuador and Peru. Phytologia 82(1): 58–62.
- Robinson, H. 1997. New species of Archibaccharis and Baccharis from Bolivia and Peru (Asteraceae: Astereae). Biollania, Edición Esp. No. 6: 501–508.
- Robinson, H. 1997. New species of Ayapanopsis and Hebeclinum from South America (Asteraceae: Eupatorieae). Biollania, Edición Esp. No. 6: 509–514.
- Robinson, H. 1999[?]. New species and new combinations of Neotropical Eupatorieae (Asteraceae). Phytologia 84: 347–353.
- Robinson, H. 1999. Generic and subtribal classification of American Vernonieae. Smithson. Contributions Bot. 89: 1–116.
