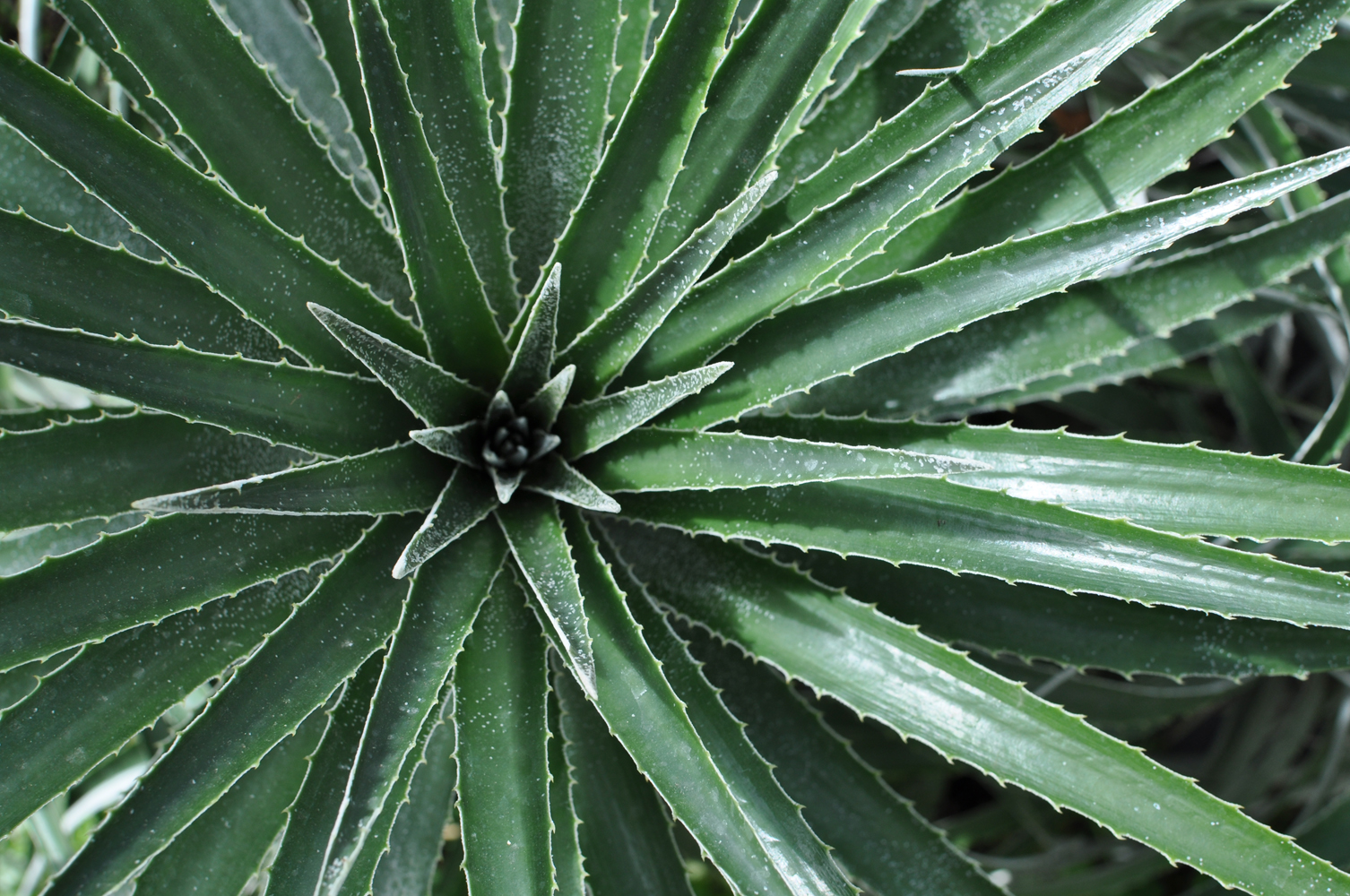

Scientific classification
- Kingdom: Plantae
- Clade: Tracheophytes
- Clade: Angiosperms
- Clade: Monocots
- Clade: Commelinids
- Order: Poales
- Family: Bromeliaceae
- Genus: Ochagavia
- Species: O. elegans

Binomial name
- Ochagavia elegans Philippi

Synonyms
- Rhodostachys elegans (Phil.) Mez

= Ochagavia elegans =

Species of plant

Ochagavia elegans is a plant species in the genus Ochagavia, endemic to Robinson Crusoe Island in the Juan Fernández Islands of Chile. Distinguished by its caulescent (stem-forming) habit and thick, spiny leaves, Ochagavia elegans typically grows on steep rocky cliffs in xeric, high-insolation environments. The species forms large colonies through vegetative reproduction and is morphologically and geographically distinct from its mainland relatives, Ochagavia carnea and Ochagavia chamissonis.

== Taxonomy ==
The genus Ochagavia was first established in 1856 by Rodolfo Amando Philippi, who named it in honor of Silvestre Ochagavía, Chile's Minister of Education from 1853 to 1854. The original description included only Ochagavia elegans, which remains the type species of the genus. Later that same year, Philippi published a second description intended for a European audience.

In his 1896 monograph on the Bromeliaceae, Carl Christian Mez reclassified Ochagavia under the genus Rhodostachys, where he also described a new species, R. chamissonis. This treatment was revised by Smith and Looser (1934), who restored Ochagavia as the valid genus name based on nomenclatural priority. They reassigned R. chamissonis, along with Ochagavia elegans and Ochagavia carnea, to Ochagavia. Mez later accepted this revision in his 1935 work for Das Pflanzenreich.

== Description ==
Ochagavia elegans differs from other species in the genus by its caulescent (stem-forming) habit, with leaves arranged along an elongated stem that can exceed one meter in height. Older basal leaves die off, leaving behind a mass of fibrous sheaths and vascular tissue from which adventitious roots emerge. The species forms large clonal colonies via robust lateral offsets, contributing to its suffruticose growth form.

Leaves are thick, leathery, and strongly spiny, with a dense, pale grey layer of scales on the abaxial surface. Leaf sheaths are ovate, while blades are longitudinally concave and recurving, measuring approximately 22.2–23.7 cm long and 2.4–2.7 cm wide in mature rosettes. Leaf margins are sparsely serrated with antrorsely-curving spines up to 2 mm in length.

The fruit is indehiscent (not opening at maturity), coriaceous (leathery), and appears relatively dry at maturity, containing numerous globose seeds. The mode of seed dispersal remains unknown. The species likely relies heavily on vegetative propagation through offsets, which may be more common than sexual reproduction.

== Habitat ==
Ochagavia elegans is endemic to Robinson Crusoe Island in the Juan Fernández Islands of Chile, where it is considered relatively abundant. It occupies steep to vertical rocky ridges and cliffs from sea level up to approximately 900 meters in elevation. It is rarely found as an epiphyte.

The species thrives in high-insolation, xeric environments with minimal soil and water availability. Its dense spines are believed to offer protection against herbivory and plant collection. Adaptations such as thick, leathery leaves and a cinereous-lanate undersurface confer resistance to desiccation. The stem’s adventitious roots aid in anchoring the plant to rock substrates, supporting its growth in exposed cliffside habitats. Ochagavia elegans is geographically isolated from its closest congeners, Ochagavia carnea and Ochagavia chamissonis, which occur in mainland central Chile.
