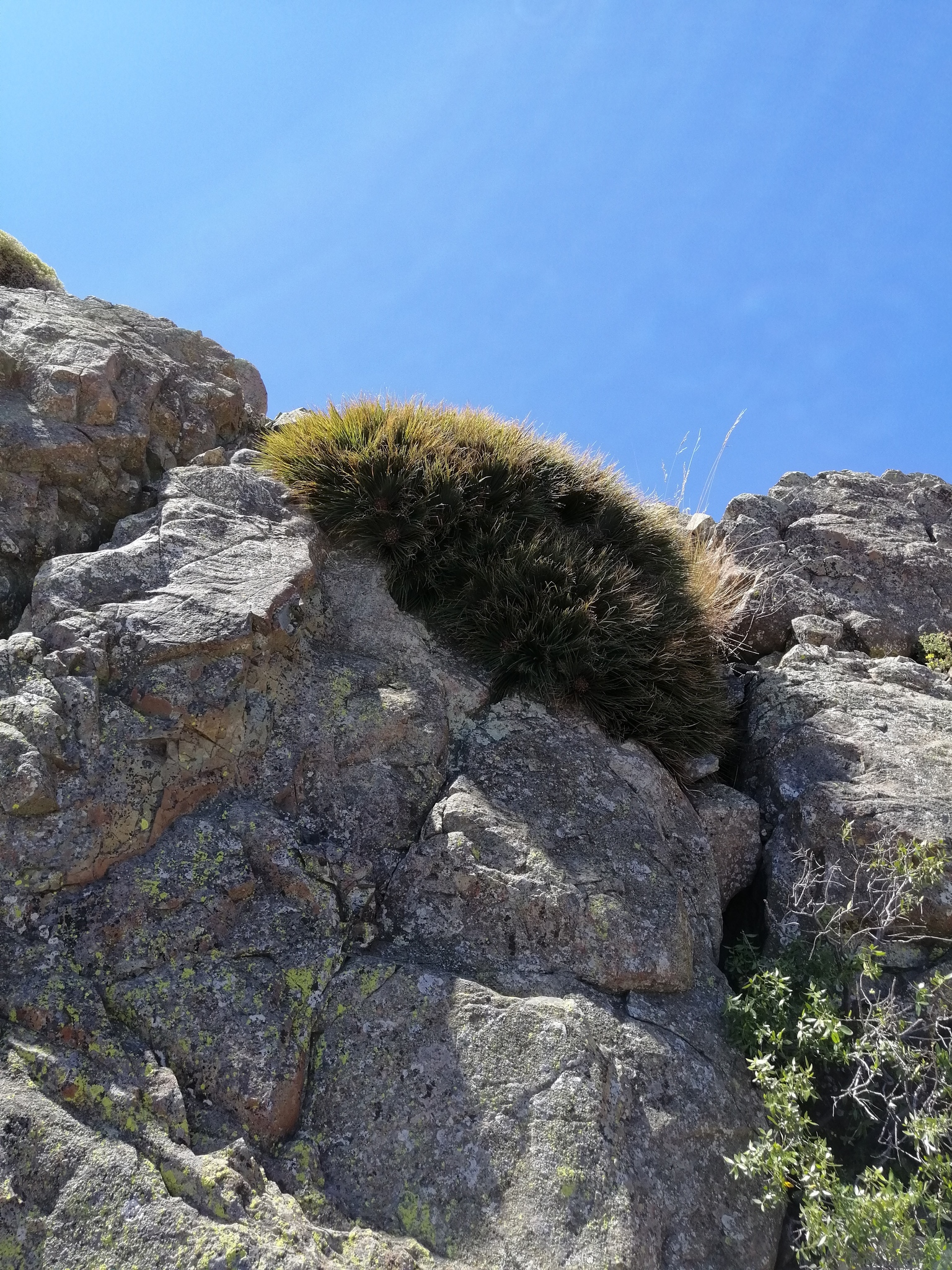

Scientific classification
- Kingdom: Plantae
- Clade: Tracheophytes
- Clade: Angiosperms
- Clade: Monocots
- Clade: Commelinids
- Order: Poales
- Family: Bromeliaceae
- Genus: Ochagavia
- Species: O. andina

Binomial name
- Ochagavia andina (Philippi) Zizka, Trumpler & Zoellner

= Ochagavia andina =

Species of flowering plant

Ochagavia andina is a plant species in the genus Ochagavia. This species is endemic to Chile.
