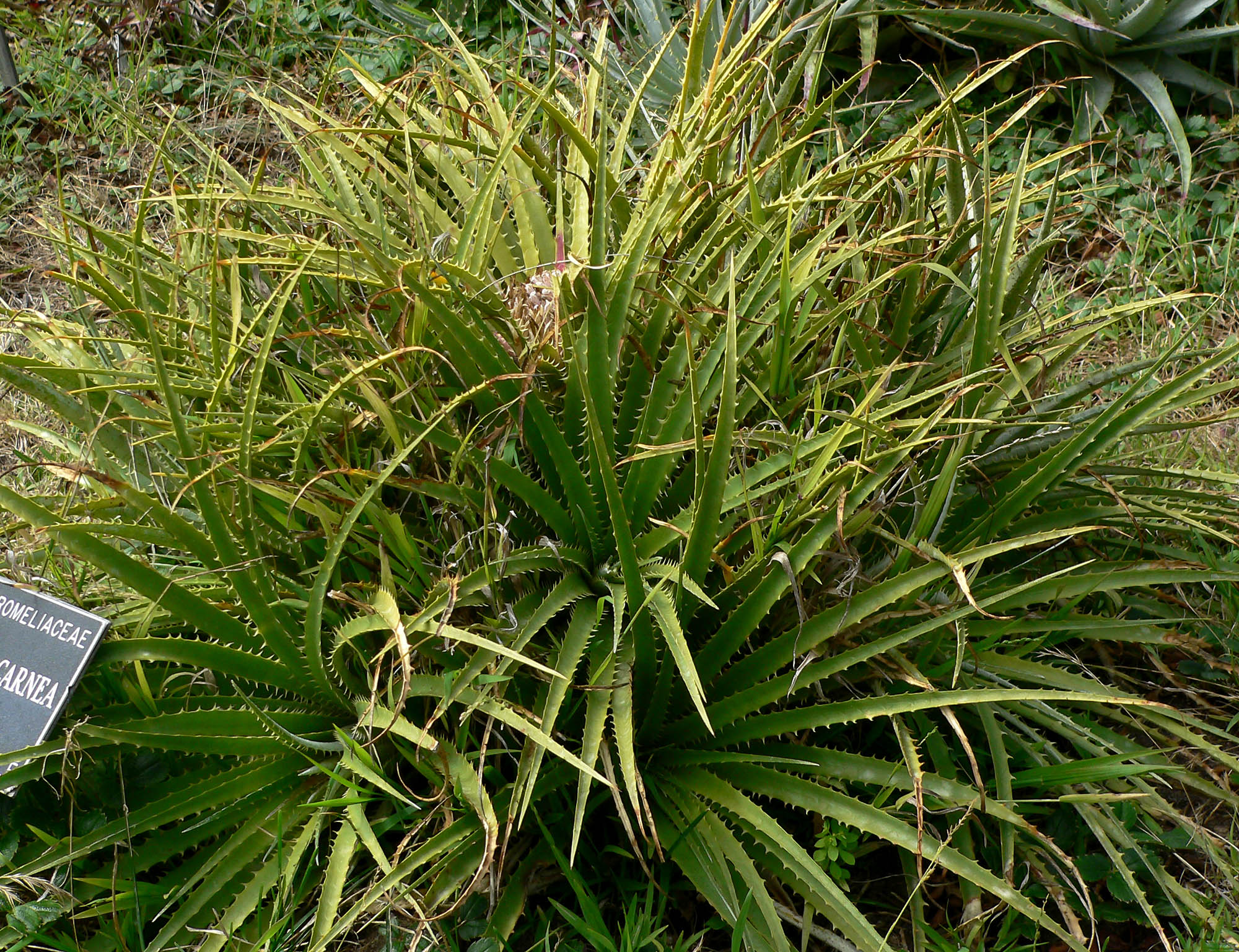
- Ochagavia carnea

Scientific classification
- Kingdom: Plantae
- Clade: Embryophytes
- Clade: Tracheophytes
- Clade: Spermatophytes
- Clade: Angiosperms
- Clade: Monocots
- Clade: Commelinids
- Order: Poales
- Family: Bromeliaceae
- Subfamily: Bromelioideae
- Genus: Ochagavia; Phil.

Synonyms
- Rhodostachys Phil.; Placseptalia Espinosa; Ruckia Regel

= Ochagavia =

Species of plant

Ochagavia is a plant genus in the plant family Bromeliaceae, subfamily Bromelioideae, endemic to central and southern Chile. It comprises four recognized species—Ochagavia andina, Ochagavia carnea, Ochagavia elegans, and Ochagavia litoralis—which inhabit a range of environments from coastal cliffs to montane forests. Species of Ochagavia are caulescent and rosette-forming, with succulent, spiny leaves and simple terminal inflorescences bearing rose-colored flowers. The group exhibits adaptations to xeric habitats, and one species, Ochagavia elegans, is endemic to Robinson Crusoe Island in the Juan Fernández Islands. The genus is named after Silvestre Ochagavía, a Chilean lawyer and minister of education from the 19th century.

== Taxonomy ==
The genus Ochagavia was first described in 1856 by Rodolfo Amando Philippi and named in honor of Silvestre Ochagavía, who served as Chile's Minister of Education from 1853 to 1854. Ochagavia elegans was the sole species included in the original description and serves as the type species of the genus. A second description by Philippi later that year was published to reach a European readership. The genus Ochagavia also includes the historical synonyms Rhodostachys Philippi (1858), Ruckia Regel (1868), and Placseptalia Espinosa (1947).

In 1857, Philippi proposed a new genus, Rhodostachys, which was later recognized by John Gilbert Baker, who treated both Ochagavia and Rhodostachys as valid genera. Baker placed species now classified under Fascicularia in Rhodostachys, differentiating them from Ochagavia based on sepal morphology: Ochagavia species have acute or acuminate sepals without keels, whereas Fascicularia species have keeled sepals with obtuse or rounded apices.

In his 1896 monograph of Bromeliaceae, Carl Christian Mez subsumed Ochagavia under Rhodostachys, describing an additional species, R. chamissonis. However, Smith and Looser (1934) reinstated Ochagavia as the correct name based on priority, transferring R. chamissonis to Ochagavia along with Ochagavia elegans and Ochagavia carnea. Mez later adopted this reclassification in his 1935 account in Das Pflanzenreich.

== Description ==
Species of Ochagavia are caulescent (stem-forming), rosulate terrestrial herbs with succulent leaves. The leaves are spinose-serrulate, forming rosettes but generally lacking the water-holding tanks found in other bromeliads. Represented by four accepted species, Ochagavia species are native to central Chile, between 31°33' and 38°14'S, in Mediterranean climate zones. Some have naturalized in oceanic European climates such as Tresco in the Isles of Scilly, England.

Ochagavia species are morphologically similar to the monotypic genus Fascicularia in terms of leaf anatomy. They can be distinguished by floral morphology, habitat (Ochagavia species are terrestrial or saxicolous and Fascicularia is an epiphyte), and distribution range (only Fascicularia can be found in the southern Valdivian temperate forests).

Inflorescences are simple and terminal, globose to ovoid or capitate, and borne on short peduncles. Flowers are bisexual, actinomorphic, and sessile, with three free sepals and three free, rose-colored petals lacking appendages. The epigynous tube is a key diagnostic trait, varying in length among species. Stamens are typically exserted, except in Ochagavia elegans. Fruits are indehiscent berries containing numerous flattened, rugose, dark brown to black seeds. The reported chromosome number for Ochagavia carnea is 2n = 50.

=== Ochagavia elegans ===
Endemic to Robinson Crusoe Island, Ochagavia elegans forms dense colonies on rocky cliffs at elevations of 900 m. It has the shortest leaves in the genus (10–24 cm) and a relatively flat, subcorymbose inflorescence with up to 20 violet-pink to dark purple flowers. The epigynous tube is 10–19 mm long, and stamens are included or barely exserted.

=== Ochagavia litoralis ===
Found along the coast from Coquimbo to O'Higgins regions, Ochagavia litoralis inhabits saxicolous habitats between 10 and 250 m elevation. Its leaves are 17–40 cm long, and the inflorescence is globose to ovoid with 15–35 flowers on an 8–12 cm peduncle. Flowers are 4–6.3 cm long, with exserted stamens and a 3–6 mm epigynous tube. Ochagavia litoralis has a water storage volume of 66%, ranking it among the most succulent bromeliads.

=== Ochagavia andina ===
Distributed from O'Higgins to Biobío regions, Ochagavia andina occurs inland at elevations of 700–2500 m. It has linear leaves 30–40 cm long and a globose to ovoid inflorescence with about 30 flowers. Flowers are 5.3–6.8 cm long, with exserted stamens and a 5–7 mm epigynous tube.

=== Ochagavia carnea ===
Ranging from Valparaíso to Araucanía regions, Ochagavia carnea grows in humid forest understories, ravines, and riverbanks between 200 and 1080 m elevation. It is the largest species in the genus, with leaves up to 120 cm long and a globose to elongate inflorescence containing over 50 flowers. Flowers measure 4.5–7.9 cm in length, with a 3–7 mm epigynous tube and clearly exserted stamens.

== Species ==
Image	Scientific name	Distribution
	Ochagavia andina (Philippi) Zizka, Trumpler & Zoellner	from O'Higgins to Biobío
	Ochagavia carnea (Beer) L.B. Smith & Looser	from Valparaíso to La Araucanía
	Ochagavia elegans Philippi	Juan Fernández Islands
	Ochagavia litoralis (Philippi) Zizka, Trumpler & Zoellner	from Coquimbo to O'Higgins
