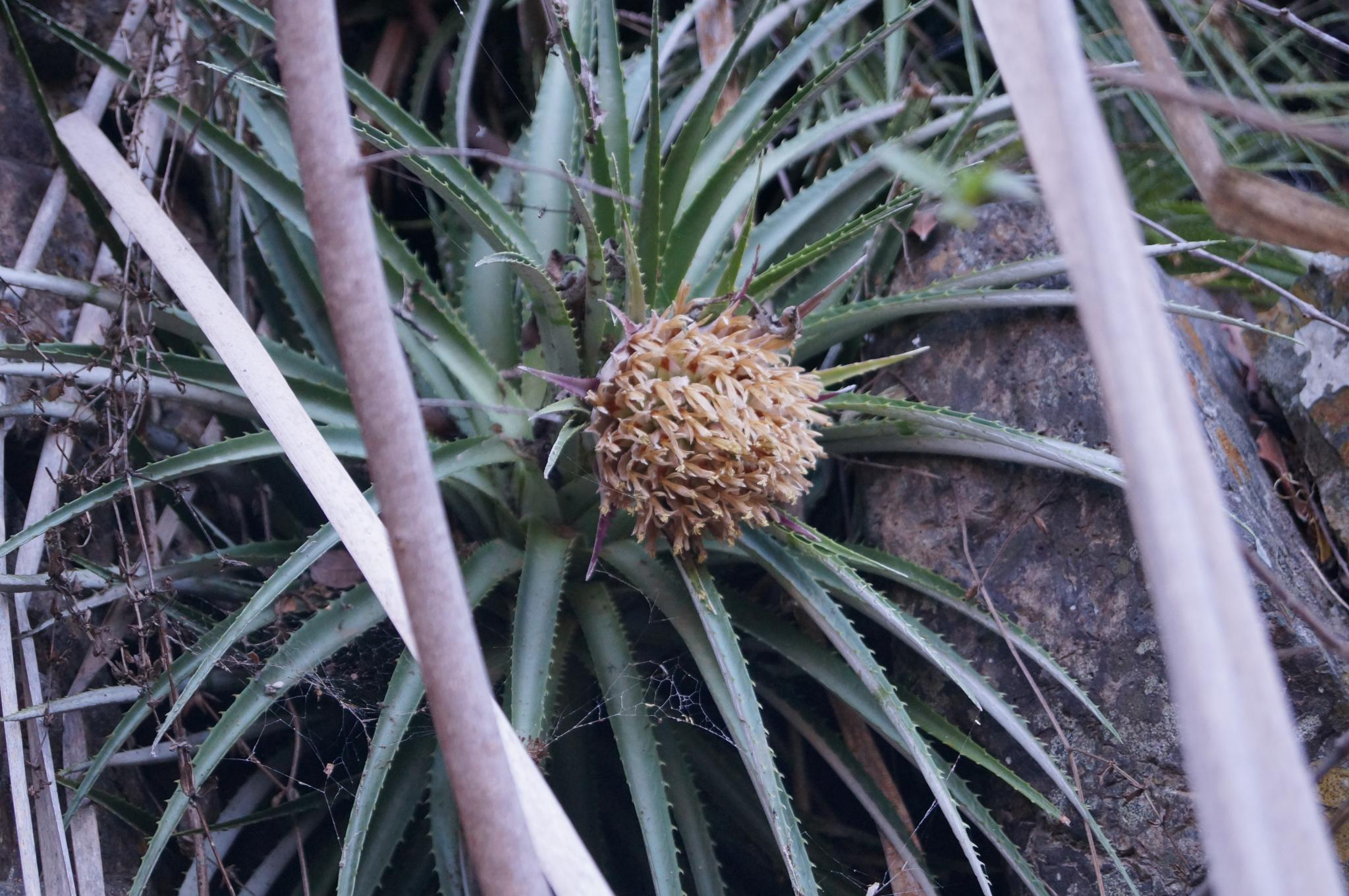

Scientific classification
- Kingdom: Plantae
- Clade: Tracheophytes
- Clade: Angiosperms
- Clade: Monocots
- Clade: Commelinids
- Order: Poales
- Family: Bromeliaceae
- Genus: Ochagavia
- Species: O. litoralis

Binomial name
- Ochagavia litoralis (Philippi) Zizka, Trumpler & Zoellner

= Ochagavia litoralis =

Species of plant

Ochagavia litoralis is a species of flowering plant in the family Bromeliaceae. It is endemic to Chile. Its common names include calilla and chupón.

This species has a stem that may exceed 20 centimeters in length and produces offsets that can form colonies. The narrow, pointed leaves are 17 to 38 centimeters long. They are leathery in texture and whitish and scaly on the undersides. The inflorescence is spherical or oval and contains up to 35 flowers. It is up to about 8 centimeters long and wide and is borne on a stalk up to 12 centimeters long. The flowers are a few centimeters long and each has three pink petals. They are surrounded by bracts. The stamens and style protrude from the flower. The fruit is a berry 2 to 3 centimeters long.

This plant is limited to central Chile, where it occurs in the coastal regions. The species has been seen in inland regions, but not collected there recently. Scattered populations about 15 kilometers inland are known, but these are rare and are considered endangered. The plant mainly grows on steep seaside cliffs, sometimes in dense stands.

This plant is sometimes kept in cultivation as an ornamental. It can be seen in botanical gardens, where it is often displayed with succulent collections.

== See also ==
- Fascicularia bicolor
- Greigia sphacelata
