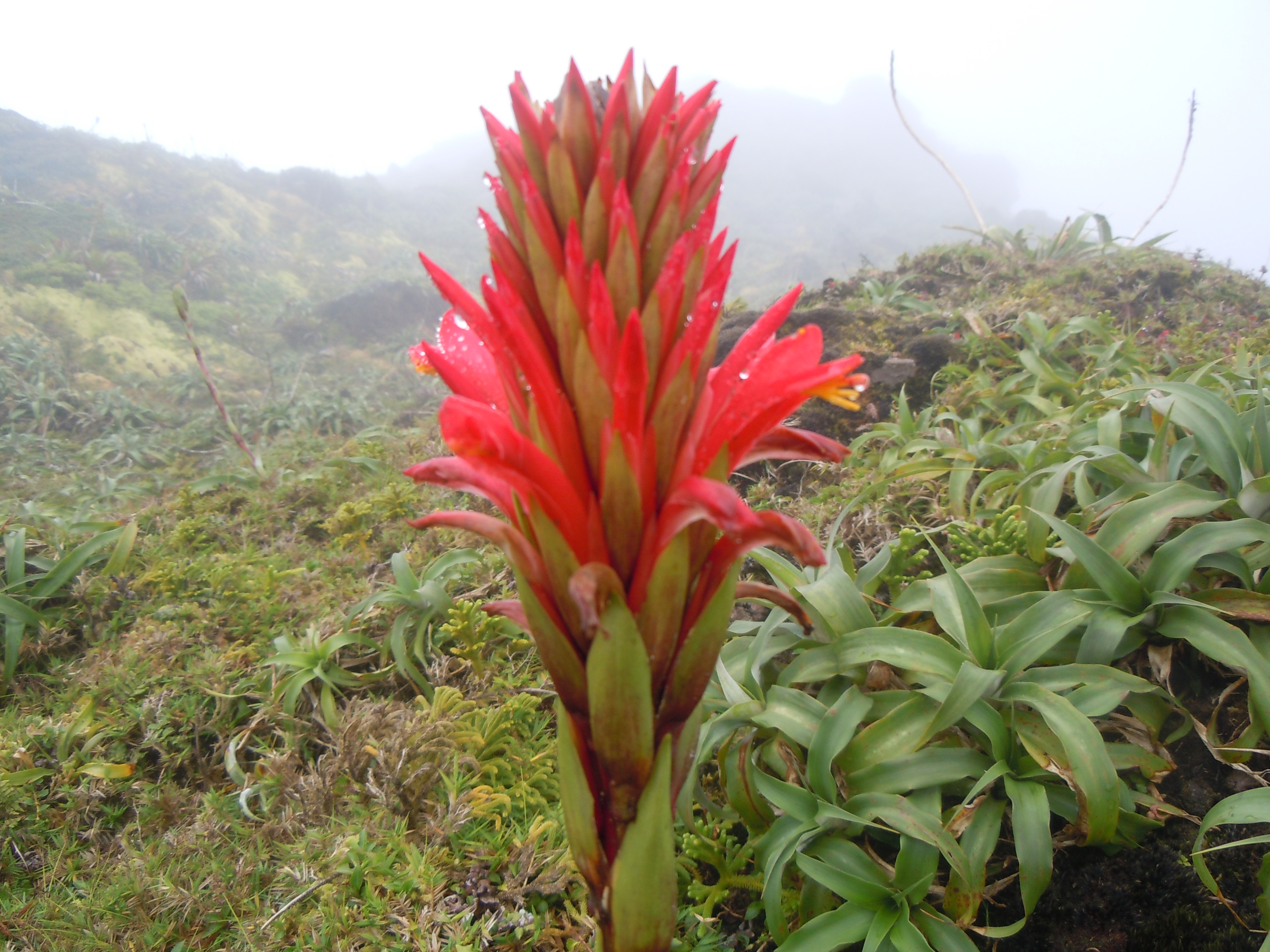

Scientific classification
- Kingdom: Plantae
- Clade: Tracheophytes
- Clade: Angiosperms
- Clade: Monocots
- Clade: Commelinids
- Order: Poales
- Family: Bromeliaceae
- Genus: Pitcairnia
- Species: P. bifrons

Binomial name
- Pitcairnia bifrons (Lindl.) Read, 1974

= Pitcairnia bifrons =

Species of flowering plant

Pitcairnia bifrons is a species of bromeliad found in Guadeloupe.
