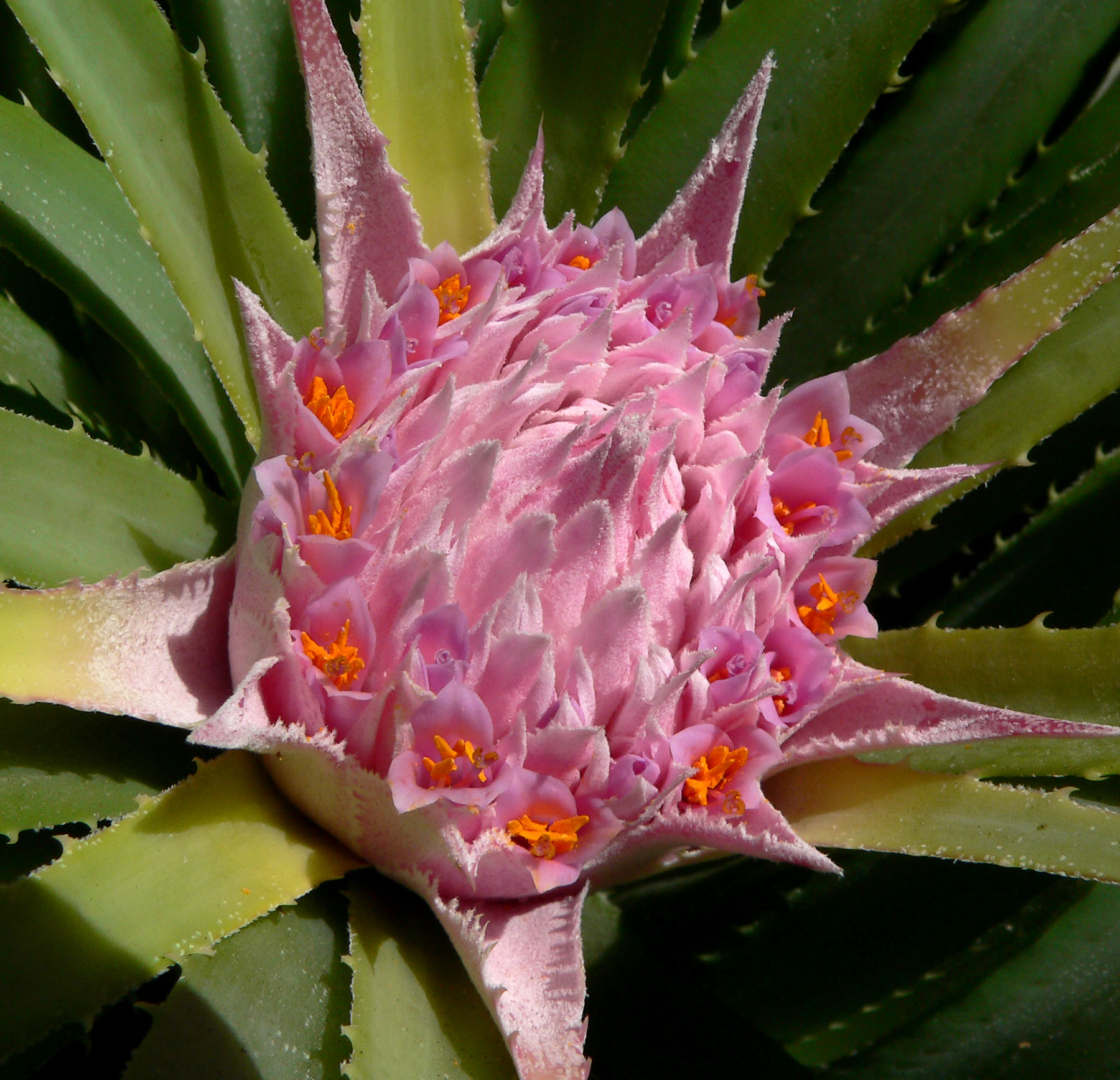

Scientific classification
- Kingdom: Plantae
- Clade: Tracheophytes
- Clade: Angiosperms
- Clade: Monocots
- Clade: Commelinids
- Order: Poales
- Family: Bromeliaceae
- Genus: Ochagavia
- Species: O. carnea

Binomial name
- Ochagavia carnea (Beer) L.B. Smith & Looser

= Ochagavia carnea =

Species of plant

Ochagavia carnea, the Tresco rhodostachys, is a plant species in the genus Ochagavia. This species is endemic to Chile.
