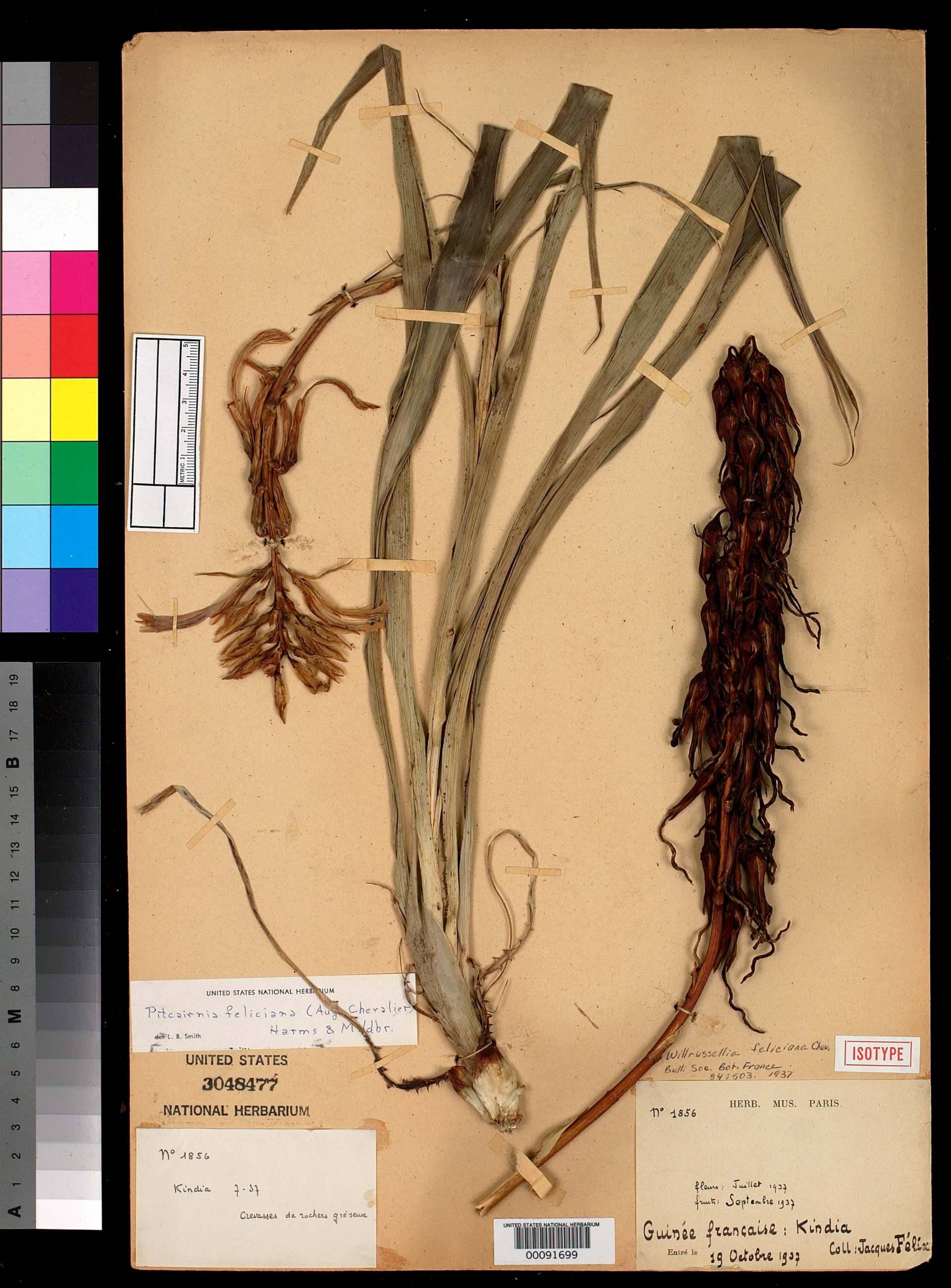
- National Museum of Natural History herbarium specimen

Conservation status
- Endangered (IUCN 3.1)

Scientific classification
- Kingdom: Plantae
- Clade: Tracheophytes
- Clade: Angiosperms
- Clade: Monocots
- Clade: Commelinids
- Order: Poales
- Family: Bromeliaceae
- Genus: Pitcairnia
- Species: P. feliciana

Binomial name
- Pitcairnia feliciana (A.Chev.) Harms & Mildbr.

Synonyms
- Willrussellia feliciana A.Chev.

= Pitcairnia feliciana =

Species of flowering plant

Pitcairnia feliciana is a species of bromeliad endemic to Guinea, West Africa, and is the only bromeliad not native to the Americas. It can be found growing on sandstone outcrops (inselbergs) of the Fouta Djallon highlands in Middle Guinea.

== Etymology ==
Its specific epithet feliciana commemorates Henri Jacques-Félix (1907–2008), the French botanist who first collected it. In 1937, he discovered the plants growing on the steep rocks of Mount Gangan, near Kindia, in the former French Guinea.

== Description ==
It has bright orange-red, scentless flowers with abundant nectar, which is a pollination syndrome typical of bird-pollinated bromeliads, although no actual sightings of birds pollinating this species have been recorded yet.

== Evolution ==
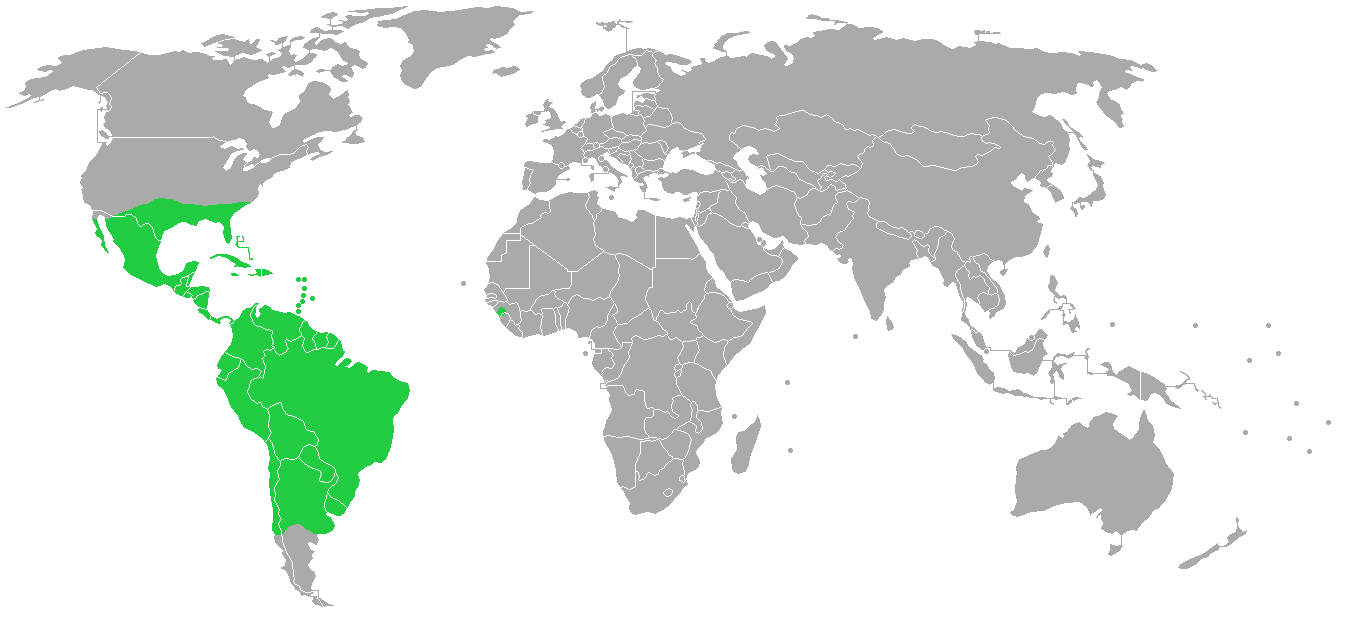
Global distribution map of the bromeliads

The divergence between this species and its closest relative in the genus Pitcairnia occurred around 10 million years ago. Therefore, the disjunct distribution of this genus cannot be a relict from before continental drift separated Africa from the Americas, as this separation occurred much earlier. The ancestor of P. feliciana probably traversed the Atlantic Ocean as seeds dispersed by migrating birds.
