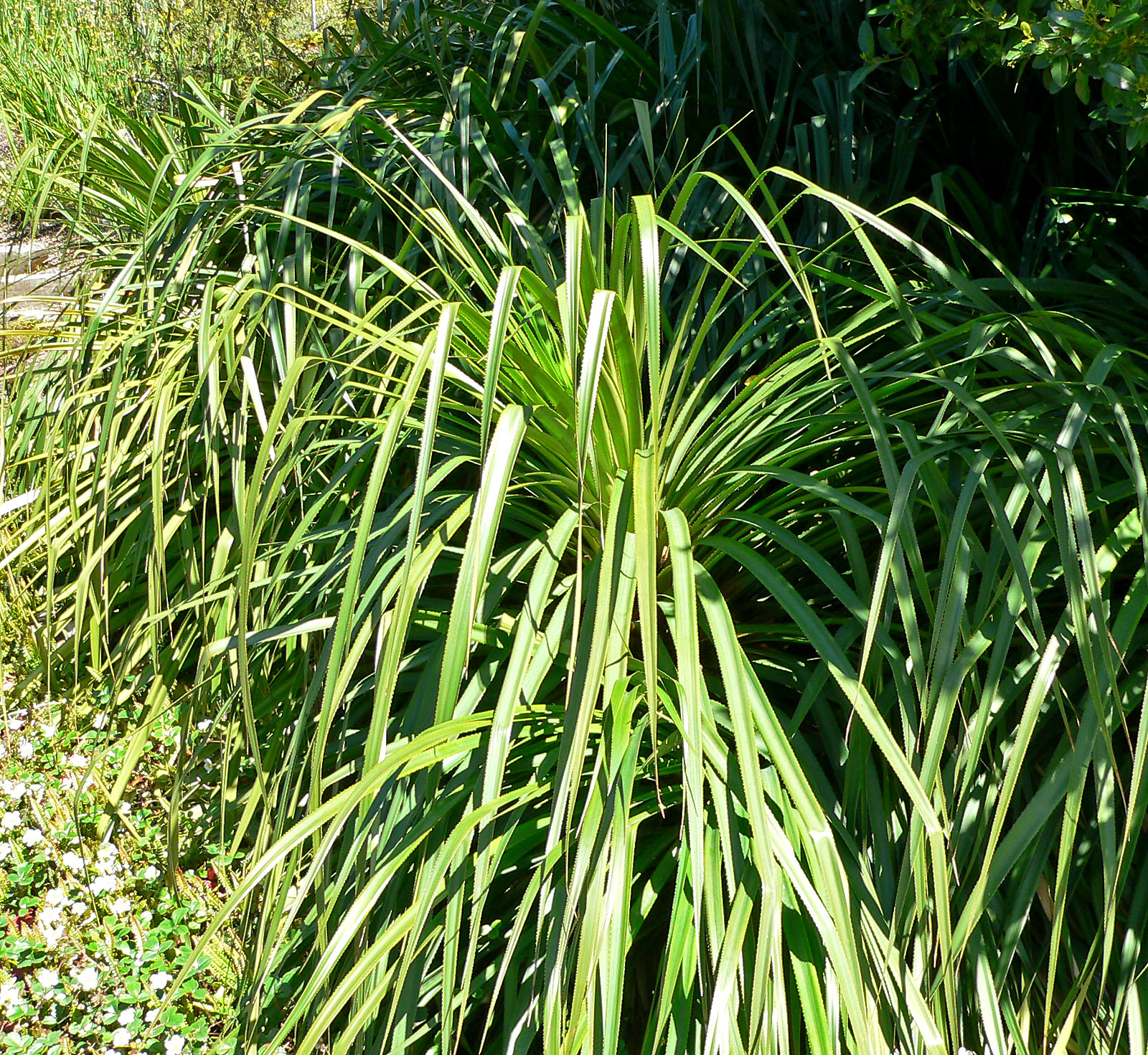

Scientific classification
- Kingdom: Plantae
- Clade: Tracheophytes
- Clade: Angiosperms
- Clade: Monocots
- Clade: Commelinids
- Order: Poales
- Family: Bromeliaceae
- Genus: Greigia
- Species: G. sphacelata

Binomial name
- Greigia sphacelata (Ruiz & Pav.) Regel

Synonyms
- Billbergia sphacelata (Ruiz & Pav.) Schult. & Schult.f.; Bromelia sphacelata Ruiz & Pav.; Bromelia clandestina Carruth.; Bromelia discolor Lindl.

= Greigia sphacelata =

Species of plant

Greigia sphacelata is a species of flowering plant in the family Bromeliaceae. This species is endemic to Chile. It is distributed between the Maule and Los Lagos regions. It produces edible fruits, known as 'chupones'.

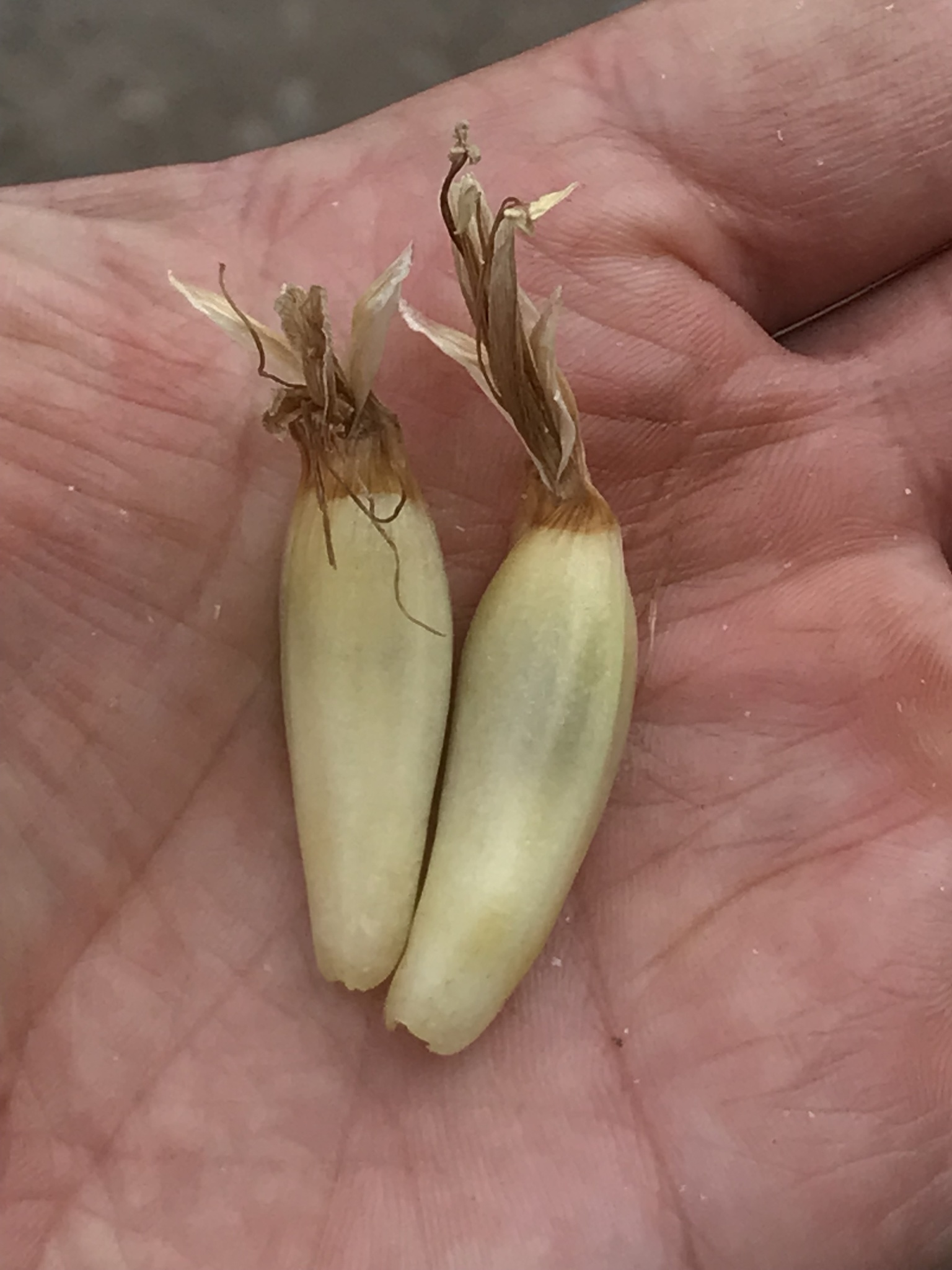
Fruit

== See also ==
- Fascicularia bicolor
- Ochagavia litoralis
- Puya chilensis
- Richea pandanifolia
