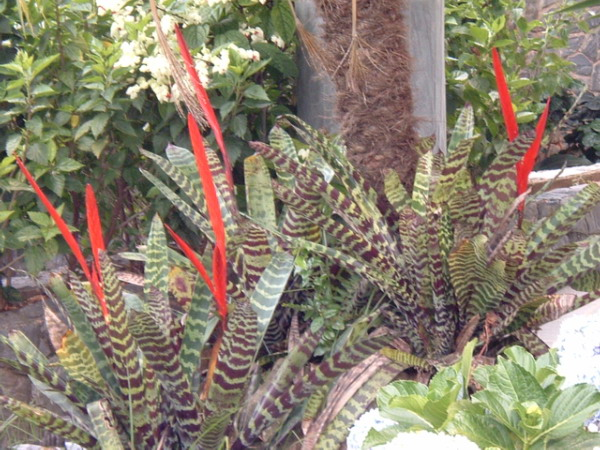

Scientific classification
- Kingdom: Plantae
- Clade: Tracheophytes
- Clade: Angiosperms
- Clade: Monocots
- Clade: Commelinids
- Order: Poales
- Family: Bromeliaceae
- Genus: Vriesea
- Species: V. splendens

Binomial name
- Vriesea splendens (Brongn.) Lem.

Synonyms
- Tillandsia splendens Brongn.; Vriesea speciosa Hook.; Tillandsia speciosa (Hook.) G.Nicholson; Tillandsia appuniana Baker; Tillandsia picta Baker; Vriesea longibracteata (Baker) Mez

= Vriesea splendens =

Species of epiphyte

Vriesea splendens, or flaming sword, is a species of flowering plant in the family Bromeliaceae, subfamily Tillandsioideae. Native to Trinidad, eastern Venezuela and the Guianas these plants were introduced to Europe in 1840. This species of Vriesea features smooth-margined foliage with brown bands growing in a rosette, usually producing a bright red inflorescence in a flattened spike. It is a recipient of the Royal Horticultural Society's Award of Garden Merit.

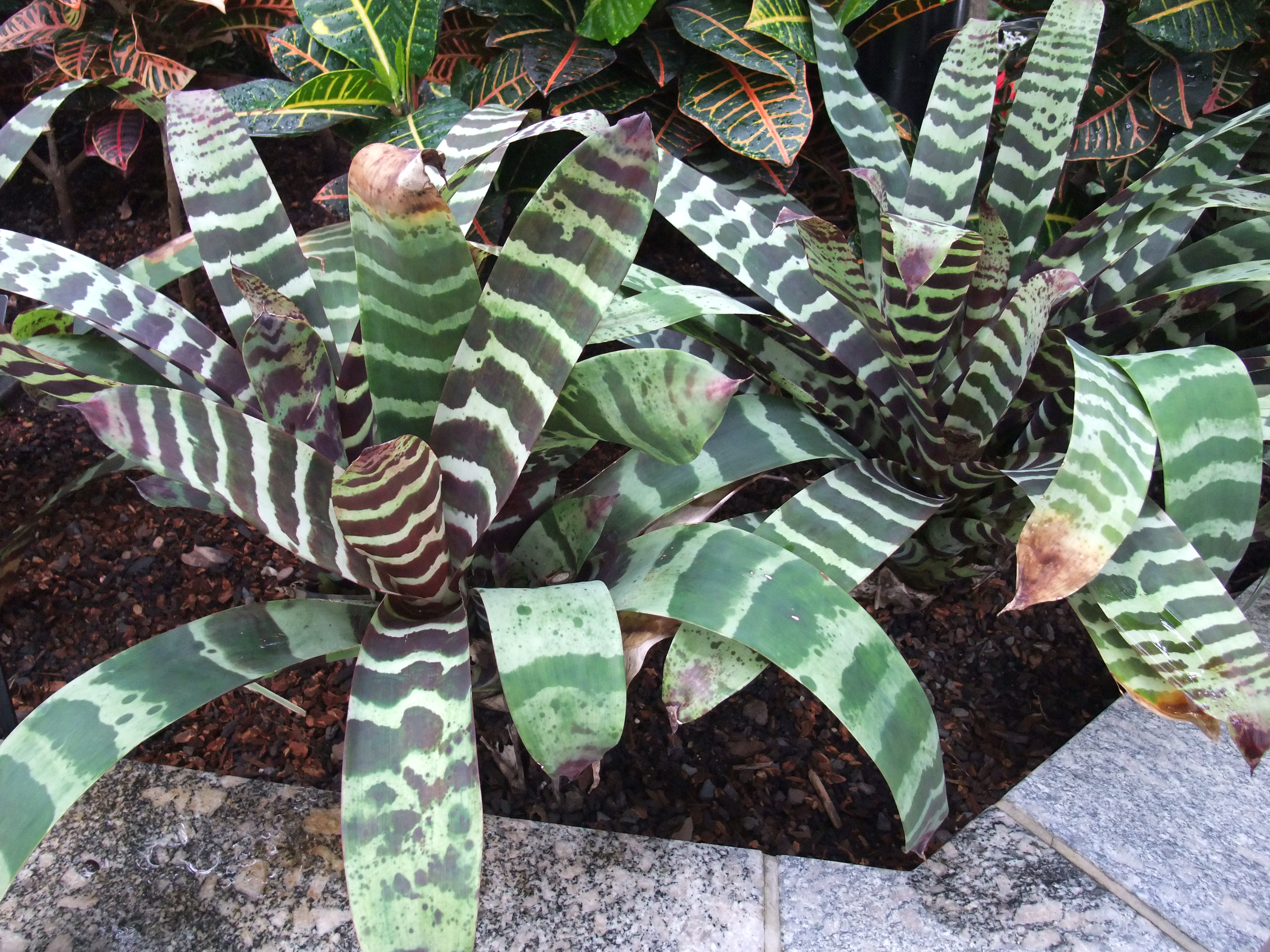

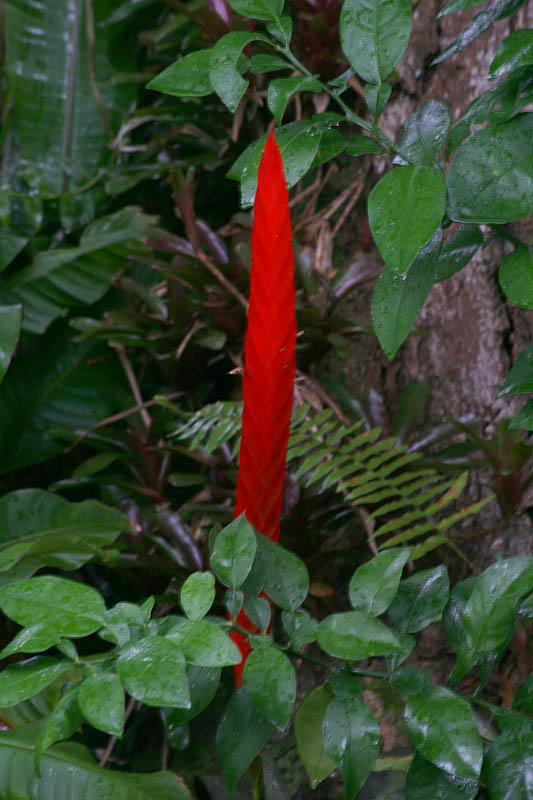

It is sometimes considered a synonym of Lutheria splendens.

The Bromeliad Cultivar Register lists a number of cultivars of V. splendens.
