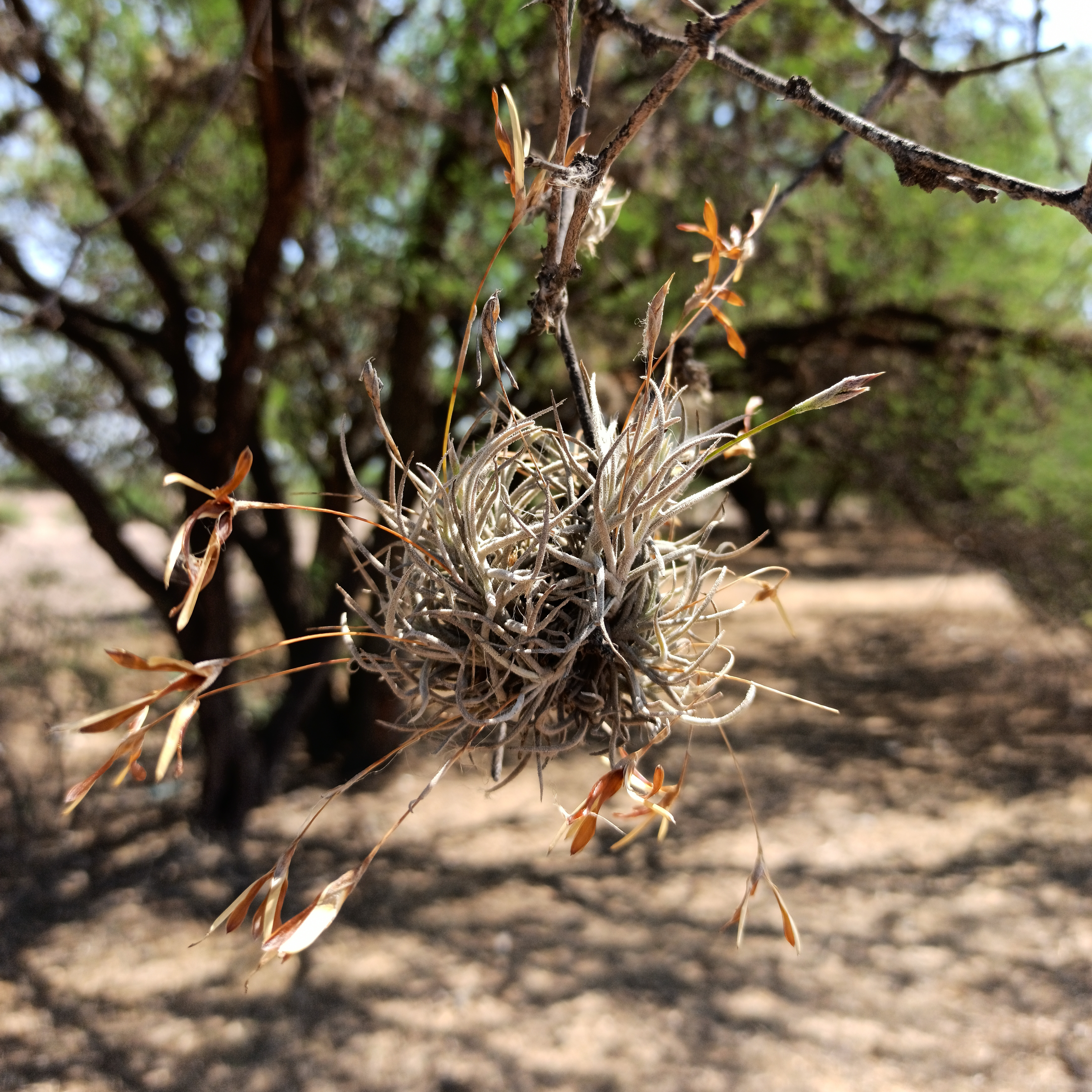

Scientific classification
- Kingdom: Plantae
- Clade: Tracheophytes
- Clade: Angiosperms
- Clade: Monocots
- Clade: Commelinids
- Order: Poales
- Family: Bromeliaceae
- Genus: Tillandsia
- Subgenus: Tillandsia subg. Diaphoranthema
- Species: T. recurvata

Binomial name
- Tillandsia recurvata (L.) L., 1762

Synonyms
- Renealmia recurvata L.; Diaphoranthema recurvata (L.) Beer; Tillandsia monostachya W.Bartram; Tillandsia uniflora Kunth; Diaphoranthema uniflora (Kunth) Beer; Tillandsia pauciflora Sessé & Moc.

= Tillandsia recurvata =

Species of flowering plant

Tillandsia recurvata, commonly known as small ballmoss or ball moss, is a flowering plant (not a true moss) in the family Bromeliaceae that grows upon larger host plants. It grows well in areas with low light, little airflow, and high humidity, which is commonly provided by southern shade trees, often the southern live oak (Quercus virginiana). It is not a parasite like mistletoe, but an epiphyte like its relative Spanish moss.

Tillandsia recurvata derives mainly physical support and not nutrition from its host; it photosynthesizes its own food, absorbing water that collects on its leaves. It obtains nitrogen from bacteria, and other minerals largely from blown dust. Though not a harmful parasite in the same sense as plants such as mistletoes that feed on the sap of the host, ball moss may compete with a host tree for sunlight and some nutrients, and by restricting available surface area for new branch sprouts; however, except on stressed host trees (e.g., in some urban settings) it rarely has a noticeable effect on growth or health.

In habit, Tillandsia recurvata tends to form a spheroid ranging in size from a golf ball to a soccer ball, though this is actually a collection of multiple "pups" growing joined together. Several studies suggest that wind is the main agent of seed dispersal. It has not been demonstrated empirically that T. recurvata is capable of dispersal through animal-mediated vectors, such as epizoochory or endozoochory. Mature seeds have no apparent adhesive on the exterior, and very little nutrient supply to support sprouting, but, like many other epiphyte seeds, they are borne plentifully and are armed with fine, straight hairs that could well adhere to wet or clinging surfaces, such as rough bark, which would provide enough time for the seedlings to anchor themselves with their pseudo-roots. In fact, as shown in the accompanying photograph, they even grow plentifully on fences and telephone wires, together with occasional other species.

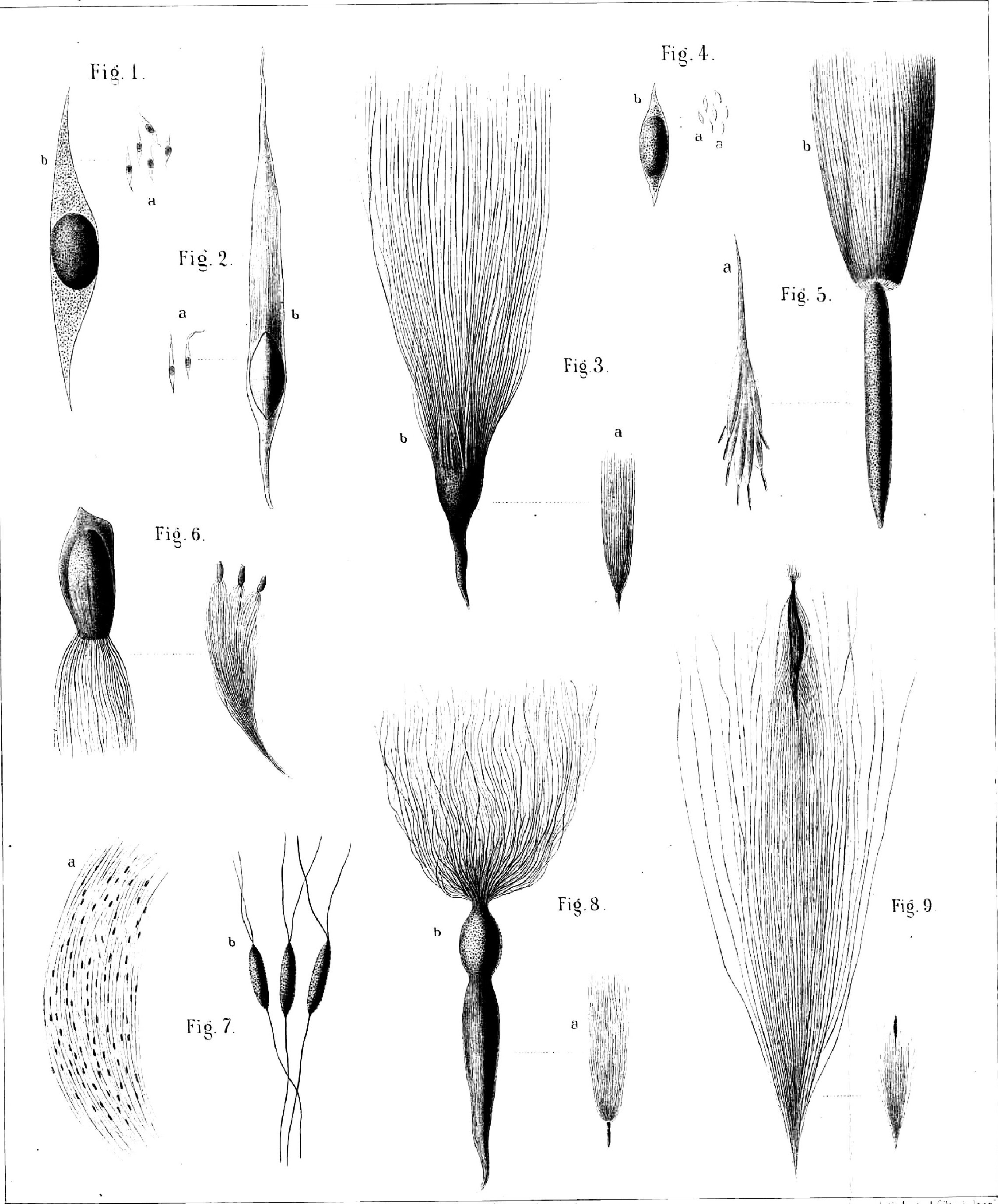
Comparison of a Tillandsia seed (number 9) with seeds of some other American epiphytic species

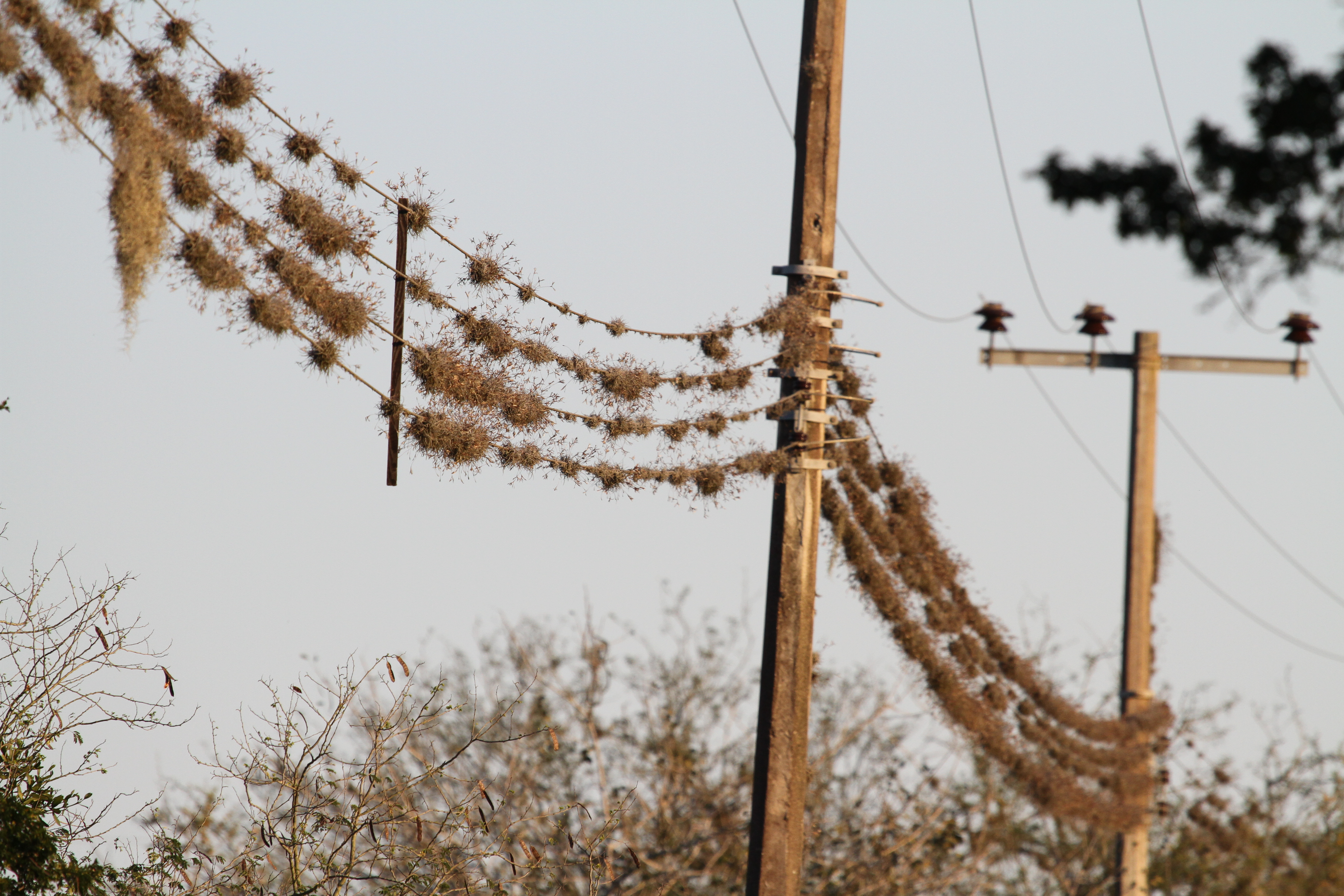
Tillandsia recurvata growing on wires, together with another species, possibly Tillandsia usneoides

Ball moss is sensitive to freezing, particularly when moist.

Ball moss is indigenous to the warmer regions of the Americas; it ranges from the southern United States to northern Argentina and Chile. The northernmost limit of its natural occurrence is coastal Georgia (where it is listed as a State "Special Concern" species), although it has been introduced into coastal South Carolina on landscaping trees. It has been reported in nature from Georgia, Florida, Louisiana, Texas, Arizona, Mexico, most of Central and South America, and many of the islands in the West Indies. In the United States, ball moss is considered unattractive by some, and many landowners attempt to remove these bromeliads from their trees using different chemical solutions.

== Uses ==
Tillandsia recurvata can be used as animal fodder.

The Pima of Mexico occasionally eat T. recurvata and T. erubescens flowers due to their high sugar content.
