= Siqueiranthus =

Scientific classification
- Kingdom: Plantae
- Clade: Tracheophytes
- Clade: Angiosperms
- Clade: Monocots
- Clade: Commelinids
- Order: Poales
- Family: Bromeliaceae
- Genus: Siqueiranthus
- Species: S. cinereus

Binomial name
- Siqueiranthus cinereus (D.M.C.Ferreira & Louzada) Leme, Zizka, E.H.Souza & Paule

Synonyms
- Cryptanthus cinereus D.M.C.Ferreira & Louzada

Genus of flowering plants

Siqueiranthus is a genus of bromeliads. It includes a single species, Siqueiranthus cinereus, a perennial native to Alagoas state in northeastern Brazil.

The species was first described as Cryptanthus cinereus by Débora Maria Cavalcanti Ferreira and Rafael Batista Louzada in 2020. In 2022 Elton Martinez Carvalho Leme et al. placed the species in the new monotypic genus Siqueiranthus as Siqueiranthus cinereus.
