= Orthocryptanthus =

Scientific classification
- Kingdom: Plantae
- Clade: Tracheophytes
- Clade: Angiosperms
- Clade: Monocots
- Clade: Commelinids
- Order: Poales
- Family: Bromeliaceae
- Subfamily: Bromelioideae
- Genus: Orthocryptanthus (Leme, S.Heller & Zizka) Leme, Zizka & Paule

Species
- 3; see text

Genus of flowering plants

Orthocryptanthus is a genus of flowering plants in the bromeliad family. It includes three species native to Minas Gerais state in southeastern Brazil.

- Orthocryptanthus arcanus (Leme) Leme, Zizka & Paule
- Orthocryptanthus santaritensis (Leme, S.Heller & Zizka) Leme, Zizka & Paule
- Orthocryptanthus vasconcelosianus (Leme) Leme, Zizka & Paule
