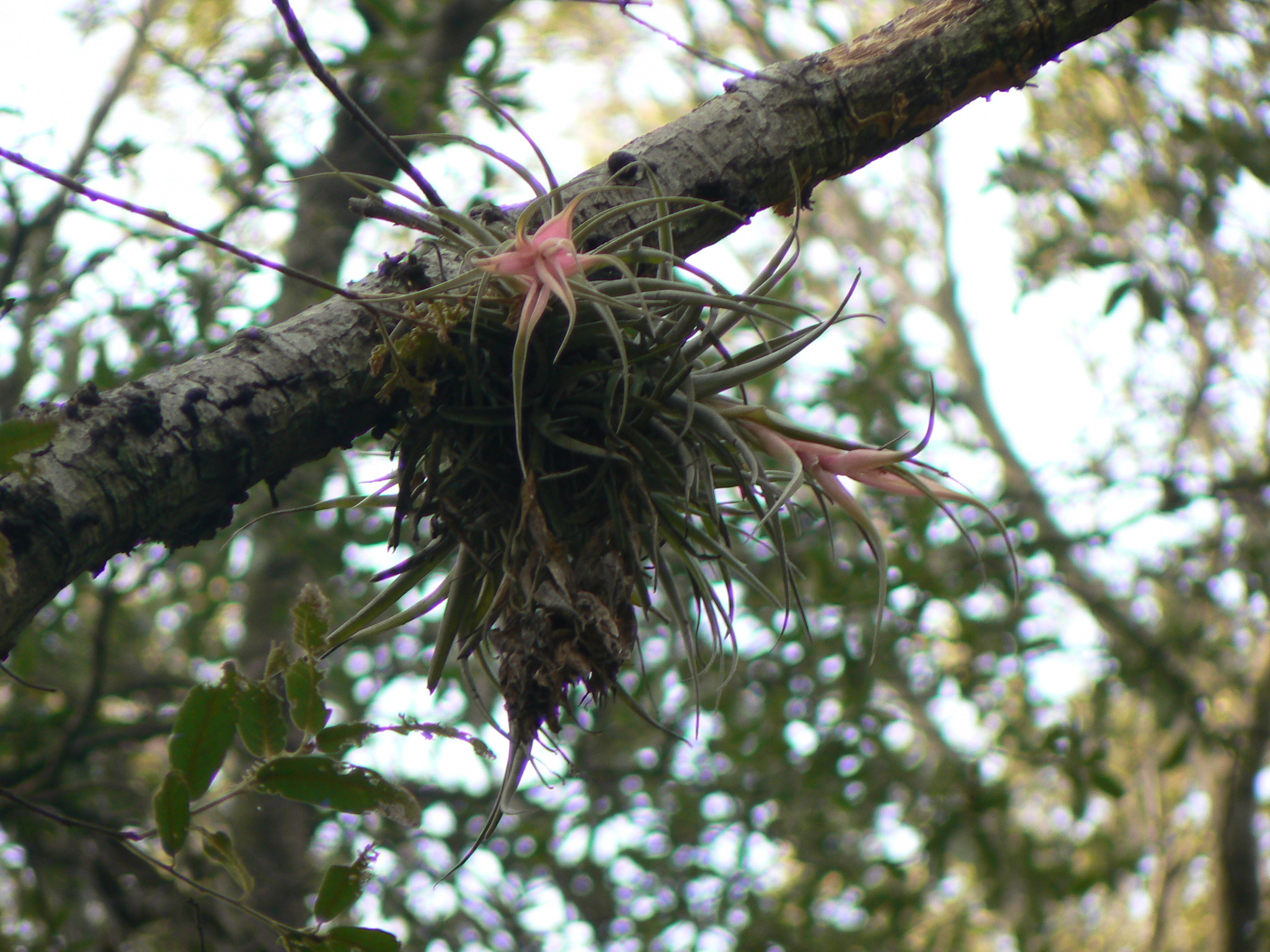

Scientific classification
- Kingdom: Plantae
- Clade: Tracheophytes
- Clade: Angiosperms
- Clade: Monocots
- Clade: Commelinids
- Order: Poales
- Family: Bromeliaceae
- Genus: Tillandsia
- Subgenus: Tillandsia subg. Tillandsia
- Species: T. erubescens

Binomial name
- Tillandsia erubescens Schlecht.

Synonyms
- Tillandsia arroyoensis (W.Weber & Ehlers) Espejo & López-Ferr.; Anoplophytum benthamianum Beer; Anoplophytum vestitum Beer; Tillandsia benthamiana Klotzsch ex Baker; Tillandsia hartwegiana E.Morren ex Baker

= Tillandsia erubescens =

Species of epiphyte

Tillandsia erubescens is a species of epiphytic plants of the genus Tillandsia. This species is endemic to Mexico, found over much of the country from Chihuahua to Oaxaca.

Three varieties are recognized:

1. Tillandsia erubescens var. arroyoensis W.Weber & Ehlers – northeastern Mexico
2. Tillandsia erubescens var. erubescens – much of Mexico
3. Tillandsia erubescens var. patentibracteata W.Weber & Ehlers – Sinaloa

== Cultivars ==
- Tillandsia 'Cherub'
- Tillandsia 'Montoro'

== Uses ==
The Pima of Mexico occasionally eat T. erubescens and Tillandsia recurvata flowers due to their high sugar content.
