= Krenakanthus =

Scientific classification
- Kingdom: Plantae
- Clade: Tracheophytes
- Clade: Angiosperms
- Clade: Monocots
- Clade: Commelinids
- Order: Poales
- Family: Bromeliaceae
- Subfamily: Bromelioideae
- Genus: Krenakanthus (Leme, S.Heller & Zizka) Leme, Zizka & Paule

Species
- Krenakanthus ribeiroanus Leme, Gonella & D.R.Couto; Krenakanthus roseolilacinus (Leme) Leme, Zizka & Paule

Genus of flowering plants

Krenakanthus is a genus of flowering plants in the bromeliad family. It includes two species native to Minas Gerais state in southeastern Brazil.

- Krenakanthus ribeiroanus Leme, Gonella & D.R.Couto
- Krenakanthus roseolilacinus (Leme) Leme, Zizka & Paule
