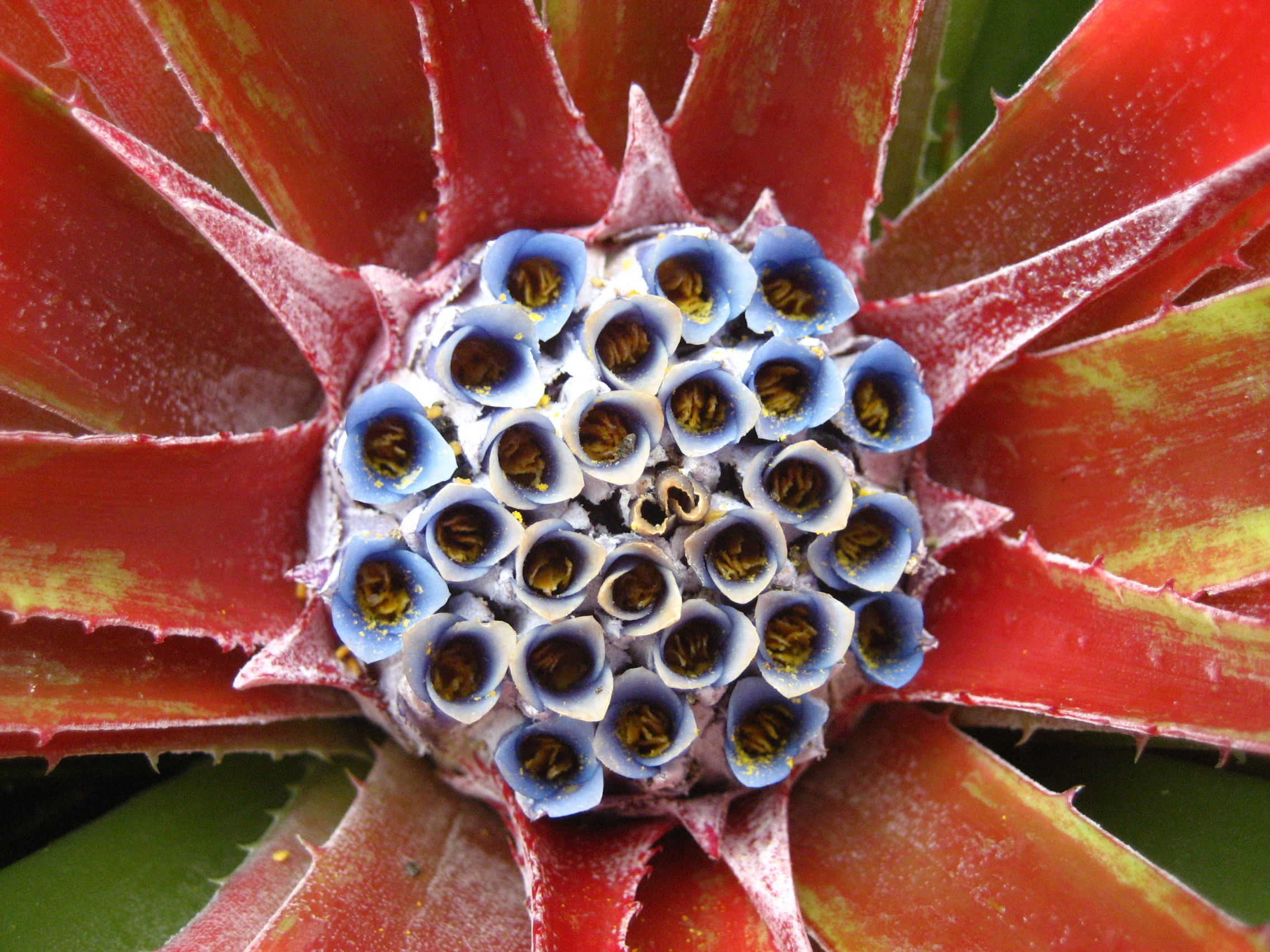
- Fascicularia bicolor

Scientific classification
- Kingdom: Plantae
- Clade: Embryophytes
- Clade: Tracheophytes
- Clade: Spermatophytes
- Clade: Angiosperms
- Clade: Monocots
- Clade: Commelinids
- Order: Poales
- Family: Bromeliaceae
- Subfamily: Bromelioideae
- Genus: Fascicularia; Mez
- Species: F. bicolor

Binomial name
- Fascicularia bicolor (Ruiz & Pav.) Mez

Synonyms
- Bromelia bicolor Ruiz & Pav.; Billbergia bicolor (Ruiz & Pav.) Schult. & Schult.f.; Rhodostachys bicolor (Ruiz & Pav.) Baker; Hechtia joinvillei Rivière; Billbergia joinvillei (Rivière) Van Houtte ex E.Morren; Bromelia joinvillei (Rivière) E.Morren ex C.Morren; Rhodostachys albobracteata Baker; Rhodostachys joinvillei (Rivière) Baker; Rhodostachys micrantha Phil.; Fascicularia parviflora Mez; Fascicularia kirchhoffiana (Wittm.) Mez; Fascicularia micrantha (Phil.) Mez

= Fascicularia =

Genus of flowering plant in the pineapple family Bromeliaceae

Fascicularia is a monotypic genus of flowering plants in the pineapple family Bromeliaceae, subfamily Bromelioideae. The genus name is from the Latin fasciculus (bundle) and arius (pertaining to).

Only one species is known, Fascicularia bicolor. It is endemic to Chile and reportedly naturalized in France and the extreme south and west of Great Britain. In the wild, all Fascicularias are saxicolous (growing on rocks) or epiphytes.

It is cultivated in gardens for the dramatic bright crimson colour of its leaves contrasting with the blue inflorescence.

The edible fruits are similar to those of the species Greigia sphacelata, but smaller; They are consumed in the same way as these.

== Subspecies ==
Two subspecies are recognized:

- Fascicularia bicolor subsp. bicolor
- Fascicularia bicolor subsp. canaliculata E.C.Nelson & Zizka

== See also ==
- Ochagavia litoralis
- Greigia sphacelata
