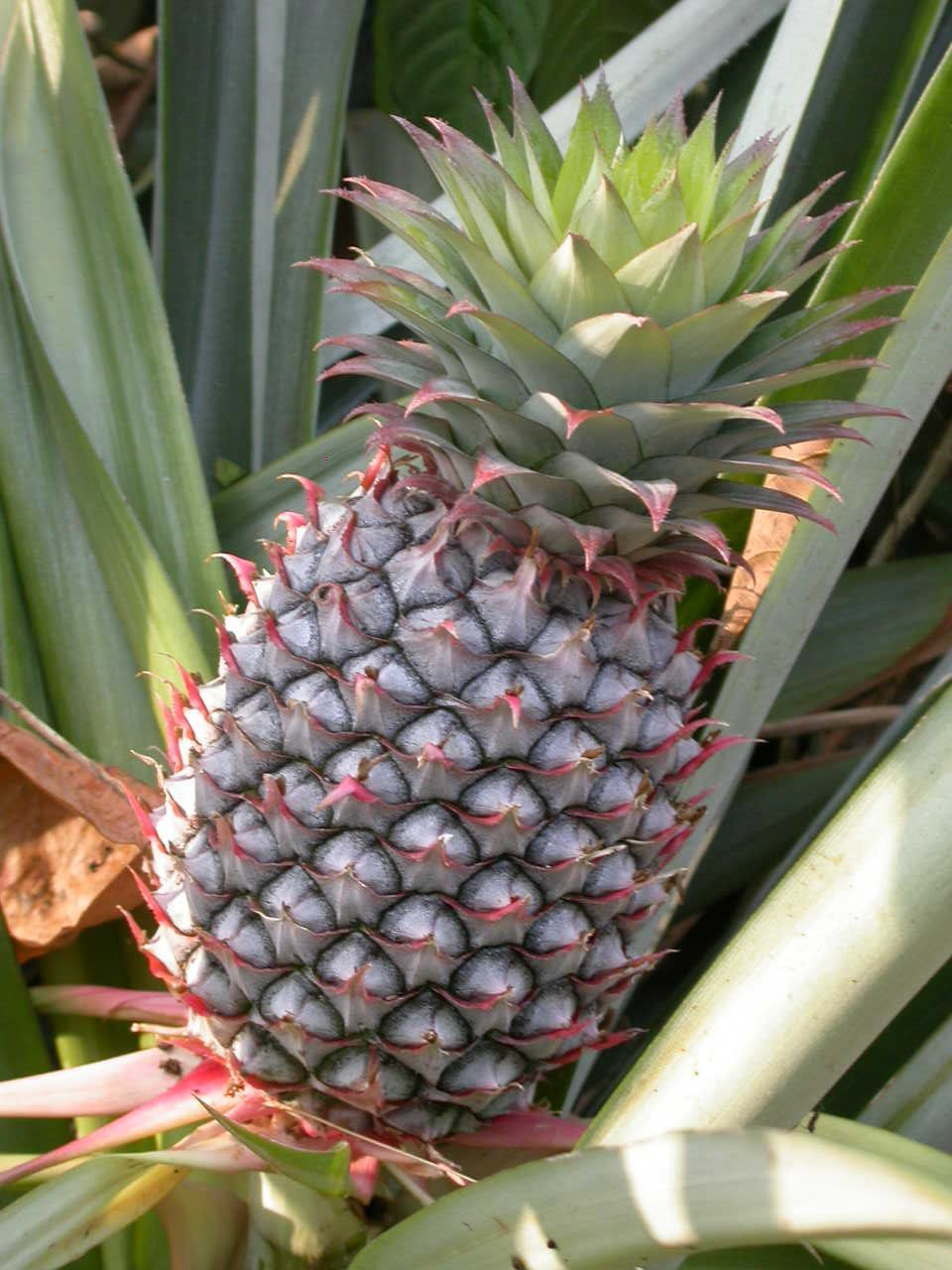
- Pineapple (Ananas comosus), a bromeliad of economic importance

Scientific classification
- Kingdom: Plantae
- Clade: Embryophytes
- Clade: Tracheophytes
- Clade: Spermatophytes
- Clade: Angiosperms
- Clade: Monocots
- Clade: Commelinids
- Order: Poales
- Family: Bromeliaceae; Juss.

Subfamilies
- Brocchinioideae; Bromelioideae; Hechtioideae; Lindmanioideae; Navioideae; Pitcairnioideae; Puyoideae; Tillandsioideae
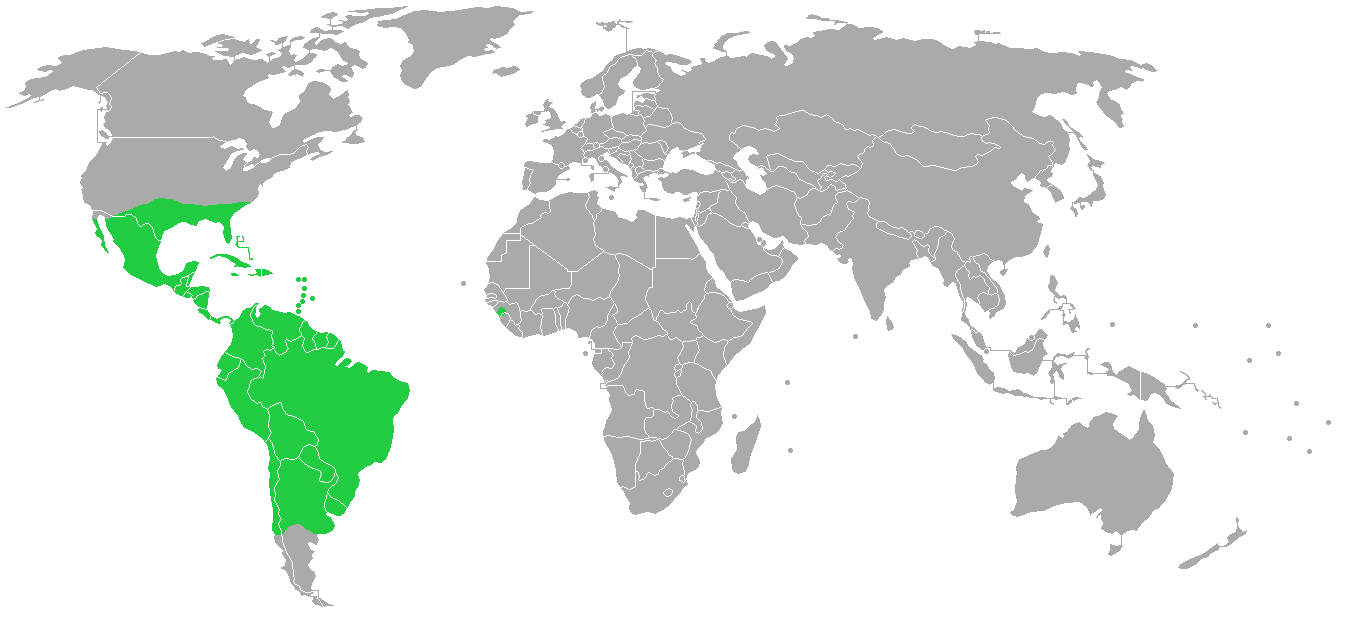

= Bromeliaceae =

Bromeliaceae Temporal range: 100–0 Ma

Family of monocot flowering plants

Bromeliaceae, members of which are called bromeliads (/broʊˈmiːliˌædz/), is a family of monocot flowering plants of about 80 genera and 3700 known species, native mainly to the tropical Americas, with several species found in the American subtropics and one in tropical west Africa, Pitcairnia feliciana.

It is the sister group to the Typhaceae, and together this clade is sister to the remaining lineages in the Poales. Bromeliaceae is the only family within the order that has septal nectaries and inferior ovaries. These inferior ovaries characterize the Bromelioideae, a subfamily of the Bromeliaceae. The family includes both epiphytes, such as Spanish moss (Tillandsia usneoides), and terrestrial species, such as the pineapple (Ananas comosus). Many bromeliads, colloquially called "tank bromeliads", are able to store water in a structure (a "tank") formed by their tightly overlapping leaf bases. However, the family is diverse enough to include the tank bromeliads, grey-leaved epiphyte Tillandsia species that gather water only from leaf structures called trichomes, and many desert-dwelling succulents.

The largest bromeliad is Puya raimondii, which reaches 3–4 metres (10–13 ft) tall in vegetative growth with a flower spike 9–10 metres (30–33 ft) tall, and the smallest are some Tillandsia species.

== Description ==
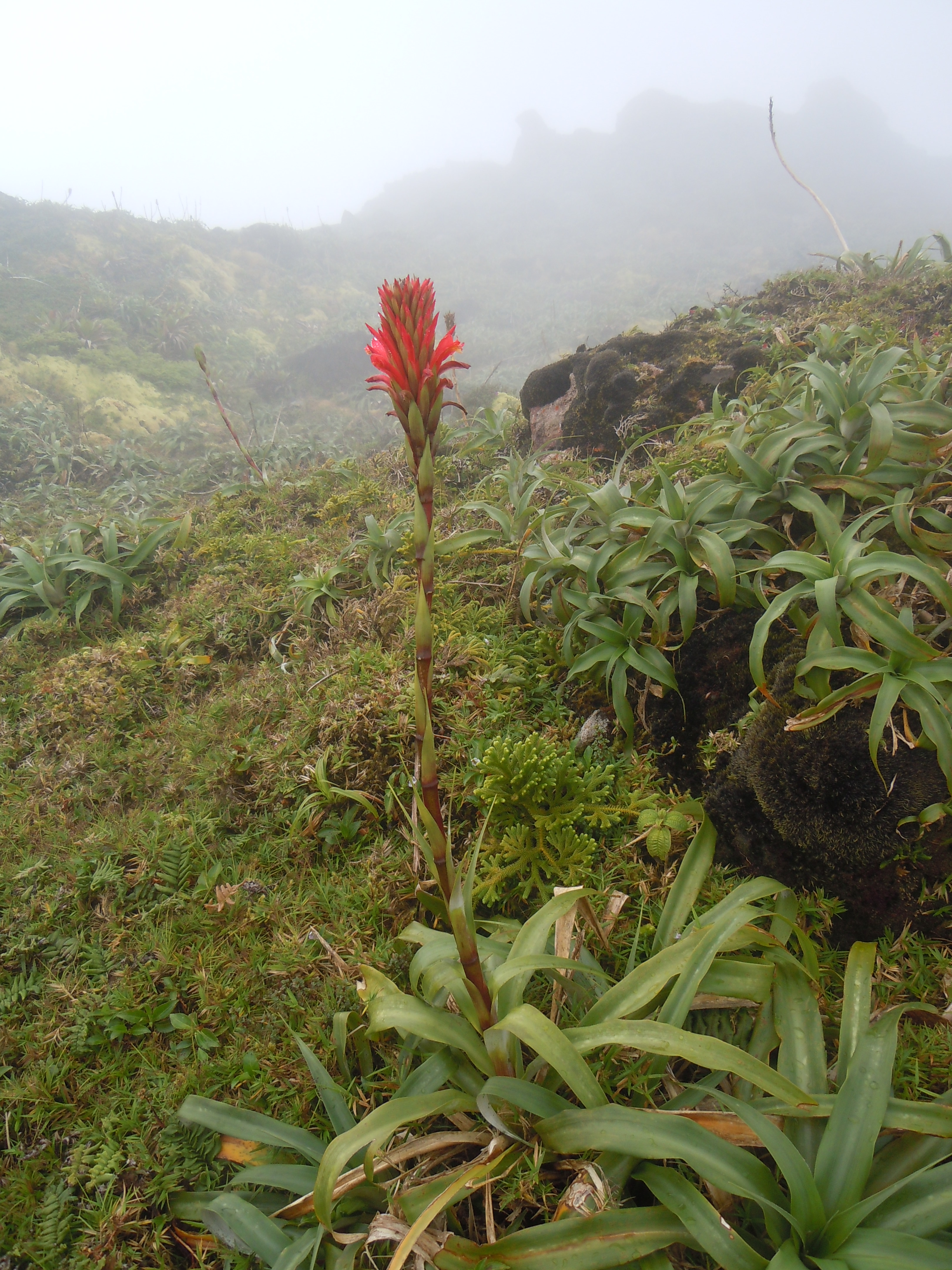
Pitcairnia bifrons, a terrestrial bromeliad

Bromeliads are mostly herbaceous perennials, although a few have a more tree-like habit. Many are more or less succulent or have other adaptations to resist drought. They may be terrestrial or epiphytic, rarely climbing (e.g. Pitcairnia species). Some species of Tillandsia (e.g. Spanish moss, Tillandsia usneoides) are aerophytes, which have very reduced root systems and absorb water directly from the air. Many terrestrial and epiphytic bromeliads have their leaves in the form of vase-shaped rosettes which accumulate water. These rosettes can hold as much as 10 L (2.2 imp gal; 2.6 US gal) of water, and be little biotic communities unto themselves. One individual tank was found to contain four harvestmen, a spider, three species of wood lice, a centipede, a millipede, a pseudoscorpion, various metallic beetles, earwigs, a tree seedling, chironomid fly larva, an ant colony, an earthworm, numerous mites, and a small frog. Individual leaves are not divided and have parallel veins without cross connections. The epidermis of the leaf contains silica. Bromeliad flowers are aggregated into inflorescences of various forms. The flowers have bracts, often brightly coloured, and distinct calyces of three sepals and corollas of three petals. The flowers have nectaries. They are pollinated by insects, birds (often hummingbirds) or bats, or more rarely (in Navia) they are wind-pollinated. Fruits are variable, typically taking the form of a capsule or a berry.

Bromeliads are able to live in an array of environmental conditions due to their many adaptations. Trichomes, in the form of scales or hairs, allow bromeliads to capture water in cloud forests and help to reflect sunlight in desert environments. Bromeliads with leaf vases can capture water and nutrients in the absence of a well-developed root system. Many bromeliads also use crassulacean acid metabolism (CAM) photosynthesis to create sugars. This adaptation allows bromeliads in hot or dry climates to open their stomata at night rather than during the day, which reduces water loss. Both CAM and epiphytism have evolved multiple times within the family, with some taxa reverting to C3 photosynthesis as they radiated into less arid climates.

== Evolution ==
Bromeliads are among the more recent plant groups to have emerged. They are thought to have originated in the tepuis of the Guiana Shield approximately 100 million years ago. The greatest number of extant basal species are found in the Andean highlands of South America. However, the family did not diverge into its extant subfamilies until 19 million years ago. The long period between the origin and diversification of bromeliads, during which no extant species evolved, suggests that there was much speciation and extinction during that time, which would explain the genetic distance of the Bromeliaceae from other families within the Poales.

Based on molecular phylogenetic studies, the family is divided into eight subfamilies. The relationship among them is shown in the following cladogram.

- Bromeliaceae
  - Brocchinioideae
  - - Lindmanioideae
    - - Tillandsioideae
      - - Hechtioideae
        - - Navioideae
          - - Pitcairnioideae
            - - Puyoideae
              - Bromelioideae

The most basal genus, Brocchinia (subfamily Brocchinioideae), is endemic to the Guiana Shield, and is placed as the sister group to the remaining genera in the family. The subfamilies Lindmanioideae and Navioideae are endemic to the Guiana Shield as well.

The West African species Pitcairnia feliciana is the only bromeliad not endemic to the Americas, and is thought to have reached Africa via long-distance dispersal about 12 million years ago.

=== Radiation of Tillandsioideae and Hechtia ===
The first groups to leave the Guiana Shield were the subfamily Tillandsioideae, which spread gradually into northern South America, and the genus Hechtia (Hechtioideae), which spread to Central America via long-distance dispersal. Both of these movements occurred approximately 15.4 million years ago. When it reached the Andes mountains, the speciation of Tillandsioideae occurred quite rapidly, largely due to the Andean uplift, which was also occurring rapidly from 14.2 to 8.7 million years ago. The uplift greatly altered the region's geological and climatic conditions, creating a new mountainous environment for the epiphytic tillandsioids to colonize. These new conditions directly drove the speciation of the Tillandsioideae, and also drove the speciation of their animal pollinators, such as hummingbirds.

=== Evolution of the Bromelioideae ===
Around 5.5 million years ago, a clade of epiphytic bromelioids arose in Serra do Mar, a lush mountainous region on the coast of Southeastern Brazil. This is thought to have been caused not only by the uplift of Serra do Mar itself at that time, but also because of the continued uplift of the distant Andes mountains, which impacted the circulation of air and created a cooler, wetter climate in Serra do Mar. These epiphytes thrived in this humid environment, since their trichomes rely on water in the air rather than from the ground like terrestrial plants. Many epiphytic bromeliads with the tank habit also speciated here.

Even before this, a few other bromelioids had already dispersed to the Brazilian shield while the climate was still arid, likely through a gradual process of short-distance dispersal. These make up the terrestrial members of the Bromelioideae, which have highly xeromorphic characters.

== Classification ==
The family Bromeliaceae is currently placed in the order Poales.

=== Subfamilies ===
The family Bromeliaceae is organized into eight subfamilies:

- Brocchinioideae
- Lindmanioideae
- Tillandsioideae
- Hechtioideae
- Navioideae
- Pitcairnioideae
- Puyoideae
- Bromelioideae

Bromeliaceae were originally split into three subfamilies based on morphological seed characters: Bromelioideae (seeds in baccate fruits), Tillandsioideae (plumose seeds), and Pitcairnioideae (seeds with wing-like appendages). However, molecular evidence has revealed that while Bromelioideae and Tillandsioideae are monophyletic, Pitcairnioideae as traditionally defined is paraphyletic and should be split into six subfamilies: Brocchinioideae, Lindmanioideae, Hechtioideae, Navioideae, Pitcairnioideae, and Puyoideae.

Brocchinioideae is defined as the most basal branch of Bromeliaceae based on both morphological and molecular evidence, namely genes in chloroplast DNA.

Lindmanioideae is the next most basal branch distinguished from the other subfamilies by convolute sepals and chloroplast DNA.

Hechtioideae is also defined based on analyses of chloroplast DNA; similar morphological adaptations to arid environments also found in other groups (namely the genus Puya) are attributed to convergent evolution.

Navioideae is split from Pitcairnioideae based on its cochlear sepals and chloroplast DNA.

Puyoideae has been re-classified multiple times and its monophyly remains controversial according to analyses of chloroplast DNA.

=== Genera ===
As of February 2025, Plants of the World Online (PoWO) accepted 76 genera, as listed below. A few more genera were accepted by the Encyclopaedia of Bromeliads, including Josemania and Mezobromelia, which PoWO sinks into Cipuropsis.

- Acanthostachys Klotzsch
- Aechmea Ruiz & Pav.
- Alcantarea Harms
- Ananas Mill., including Pseudananas Hassl. ex Harms (includes the pineapple)
- Androlepis Brongn. ex Houllet
- Araeococcus Brongn.
- Bakerantha L.B.Sm.
- Barfussia Manzan. & W.Till
- Billbergia Thunb.
- Brewcaria L.B.Sm., Steyerm. & H.Rob, synonym of Navia in PoWO
- Brocchinia Schult.f.
- Bromelia L.
- Canistropsis (Mez) Leme
- Canistrum E.Morren
- Catopsis Griseb.
- Cipuropsis Ule
- Connellia N.E.Br.
- Cottendorfia Schult.f.
- Cryptanthus Otto & A.Dietr.
- Deinacanthon Mez
- Deuterocohnia Mez
- Disteganthus Lem.
- Dyckia Schult.f.
- Edmundoa Leme
- Eduandrea Leme, W.Till, G.K.Br., J.R.Grant & Govaerts
- Encholirium Mart. ex Schult.f.
- Fascicularia Mez
- Fernseea Baker
- Forzzaea Leme, S.Heller & Zizka
- Fosterella L.B.Sm.
- Glomeropitcairnia Mez
- Goudaea W.Till & Barfuss
- Gregbrownia W.Till & Barfuss
- Greigia Regel
- Guzmania Ruiz & Pav.
- Hechtia Klotzsch
- Hohenbergia Schult.f.
- Hohenbergiopsis L.B.Sm. & Read
- Hoplocryptanthus (Mez) Leme, S.Heller & Zizka
- Hylaeaicum (Ule ex Mez) Leme, Forzza, Zizka & Aguirre-Santoro
- Jagrantia Barfuss & W.Till
- Josemania W.Till & Barfuss
- Karawata J.R.Maciel & G.M.Sousa
- Krenakanthus (Leme, S.Heller & Zizka) Leme, Zizka & Paule
- Lapanthus Louzada & Versieux
- Lemeltonia Barfuss & W.Till
- Lindmania Mez
- Lutheria Barfuss & W.Till
- Lymania Read
- Mezobromelia L.B.Sm.
- Navia Schult.f.
- Neoglaziovia Mez
- Neoregelia L.B.Sm.
- Nidularium Lem.
- Ochagavia Phil.
- Orthocryptanthus (Leme, S.Heller & Zizka) Leme, Zizka & Paule
- Orthophytum Beer
- Pitcairnia L'Her., including subgenus Pepinia
- Portea K. Koch
- Pseudaechmea L.B.Sm. & Read, synonym of Billbergia in PoWO
- Pseudalcantarea (Mez) Pinzón & Barfuss
- Pseudaraeococcus (Mez) R.A.Pontes & Versieux
- Puya Molina
- Quesnelia Gaudich.
- Racinaea M.A.Spencer & L.B.Sm.
- Rokautskyia Leme, S.Heller & Zizka
- Ronnbergia E.Morren & André
- Sequencia Givnish
- Sincoraea Ule
- Siqueiranthus Leme, Zizka, E.H.Souza & Paule
- Steyerbromelia L.B.Sm.
- Stigmatodon Leme, G.K.Br. & Barfuss
- Tillandsia L.
- Ursulaea Read & H.U.Baensch, synonym of Aechmea in PoWO
- Vriesea Lindl.
- Wallisia (Regel) É.Morren
- Waltillia Leme, Barfuss & Halbritt.
- Werauhia J.R.Grant
- Wittmackia Mez
- Wittrockia Lindm.
- Zizkaea W.Till & Barfuss

=== Hybrid genera ===
Intergeneric hybrid genera accepted by Plants of the World Online include:

- × Cryptbergia R.G.Wilson & C.L.Wilson = Cryptanthus × Billbergia
- × Guzlandsia Gouda = Guzmania × Tillandsia
- × Hohenmea B.R.Silva & L.F.Sousa = Hohenbergia × Aechmea
- × Niduregelia Leme = Nidularium × Neoregelia

== Gallery ==
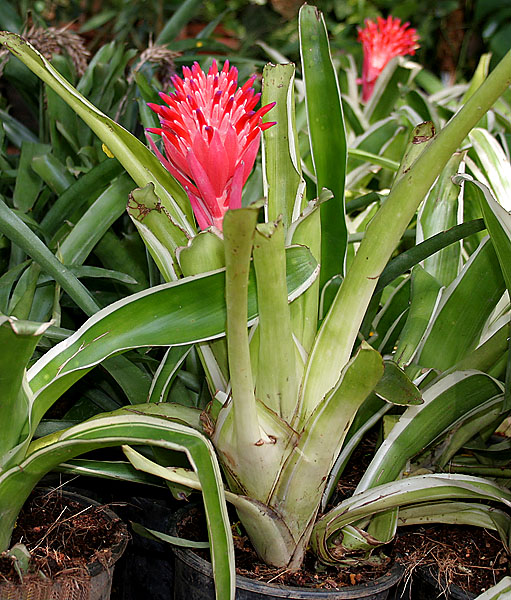
Billbergia pyramidalis

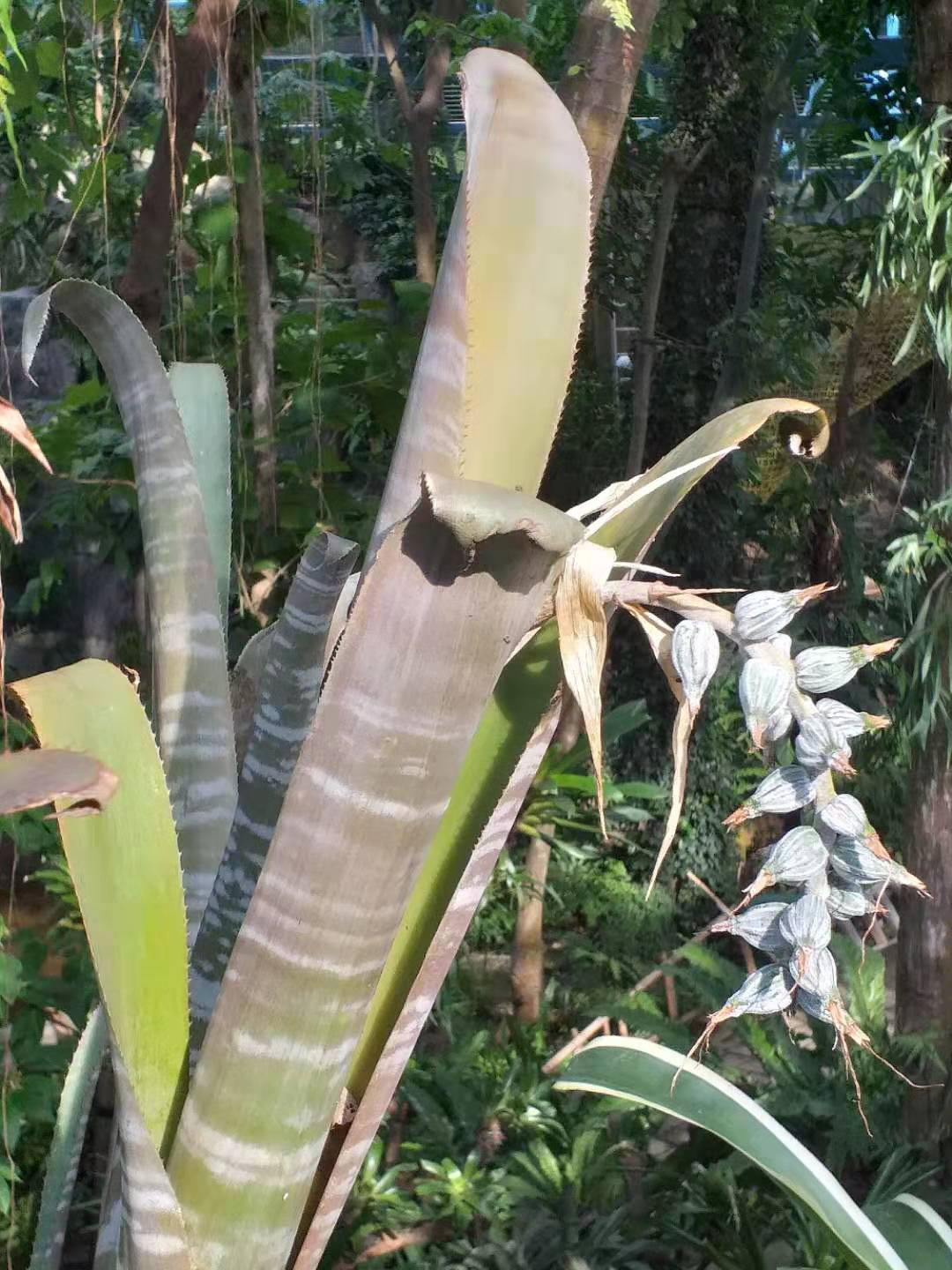
Billbergia vittata Brongniart

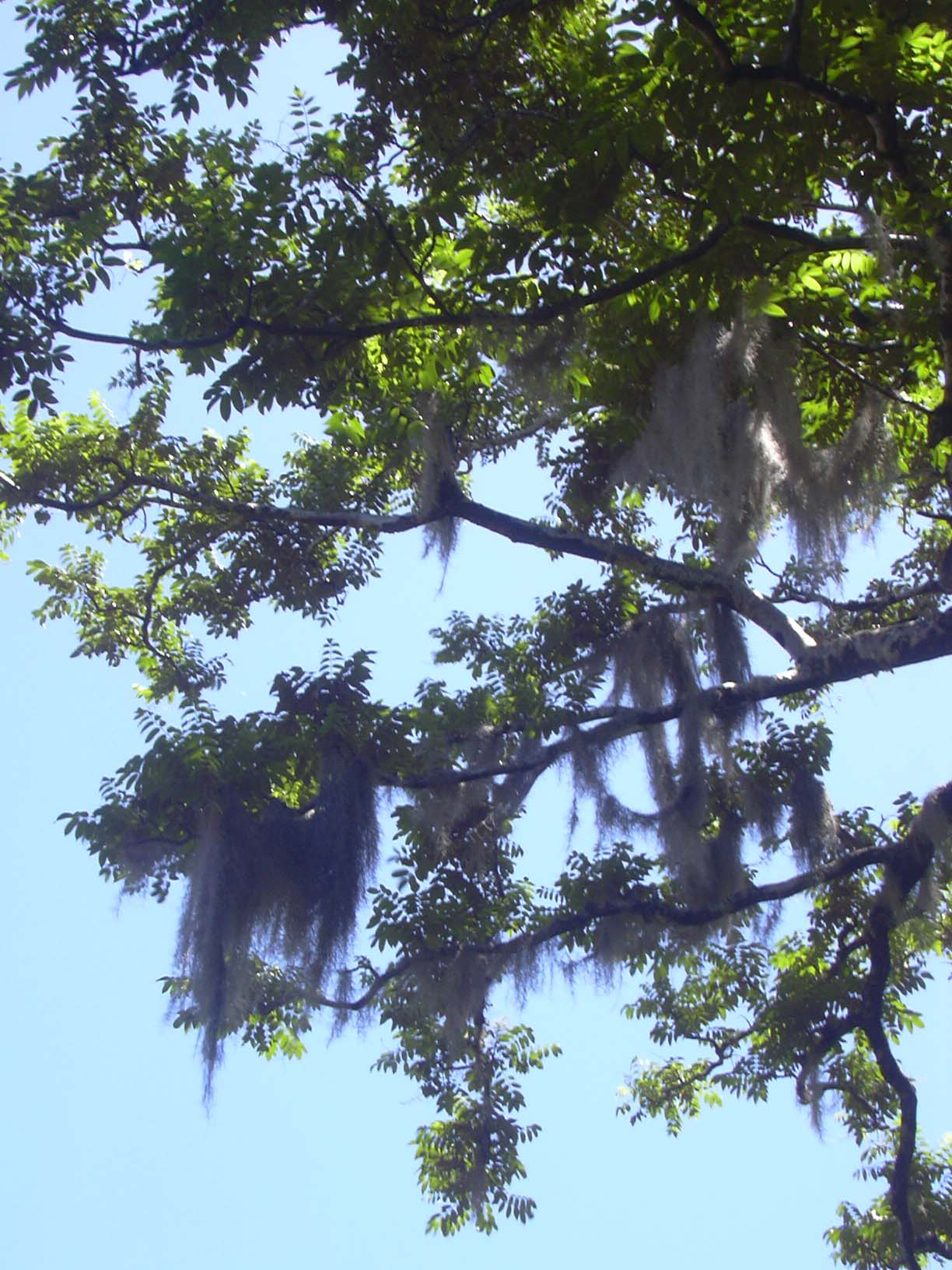
Tillandsia usneoides hanging from branches

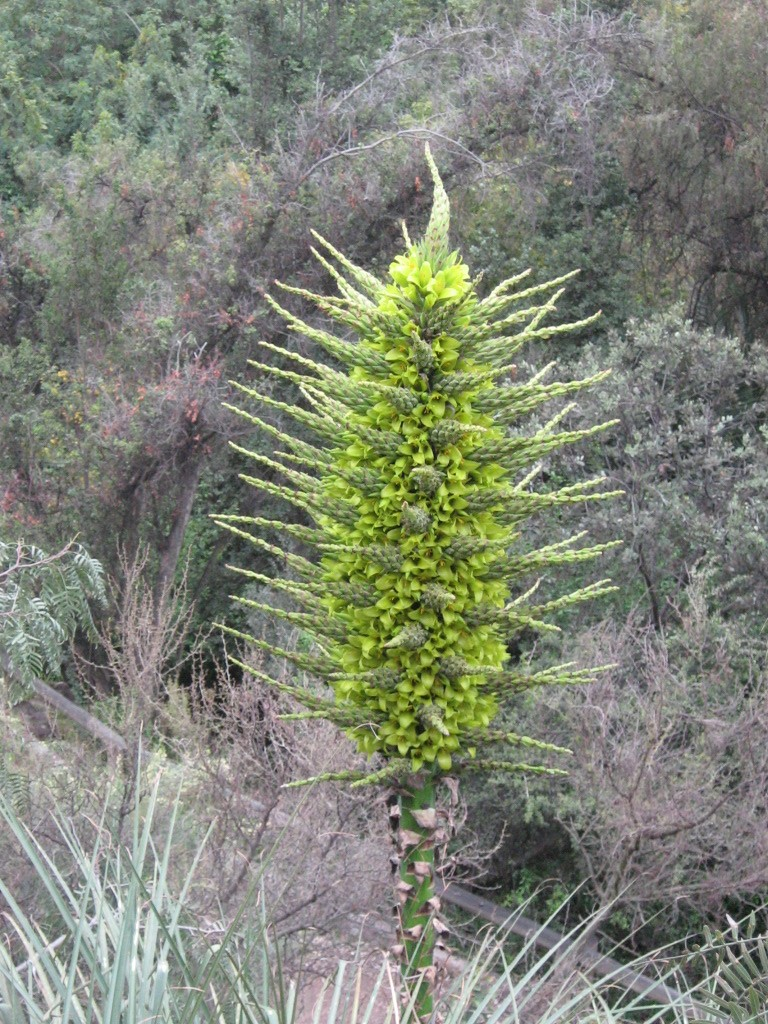
Puya chilensis

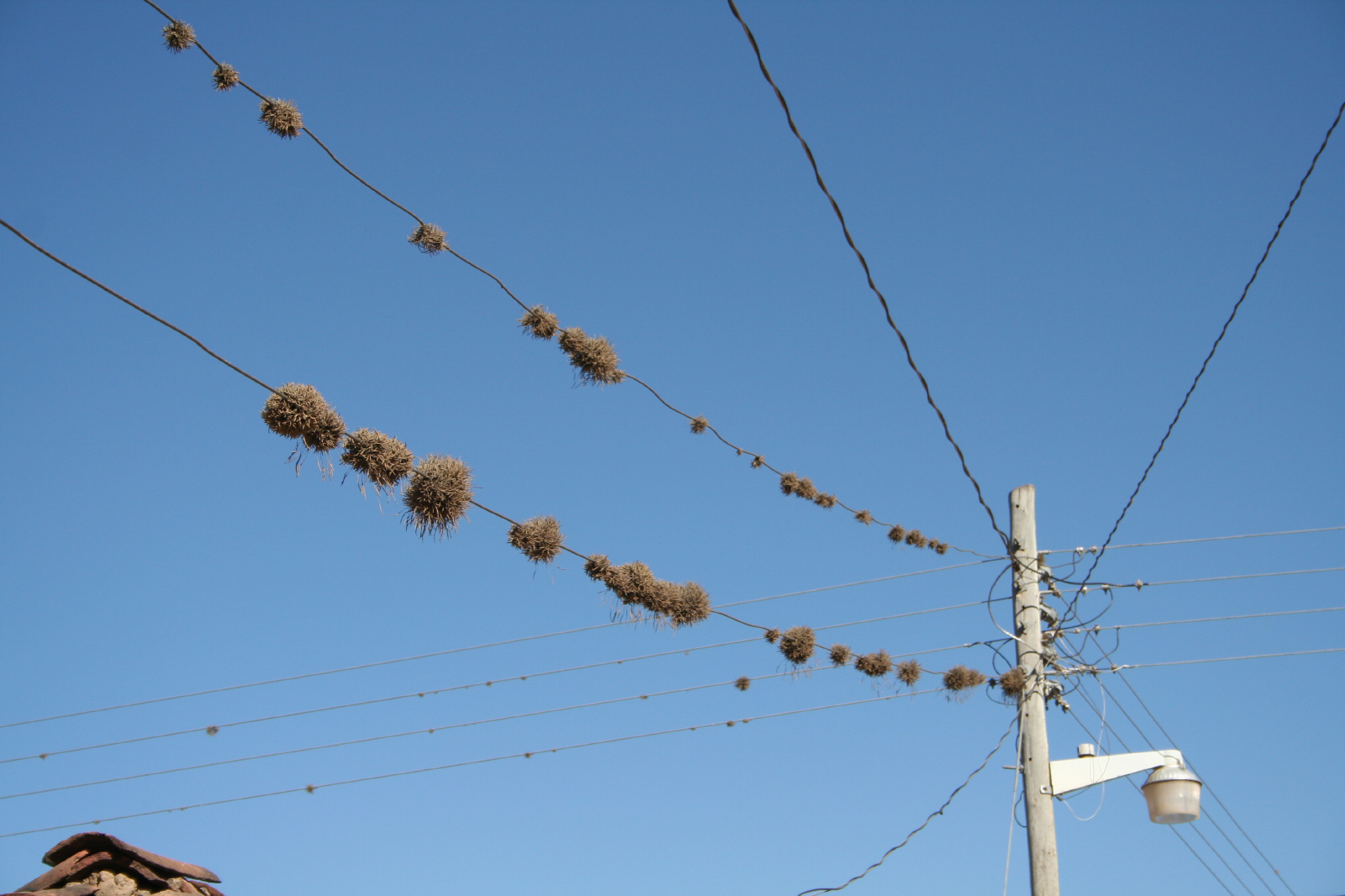
Tillandsia growing on telephone lines in Bolivia

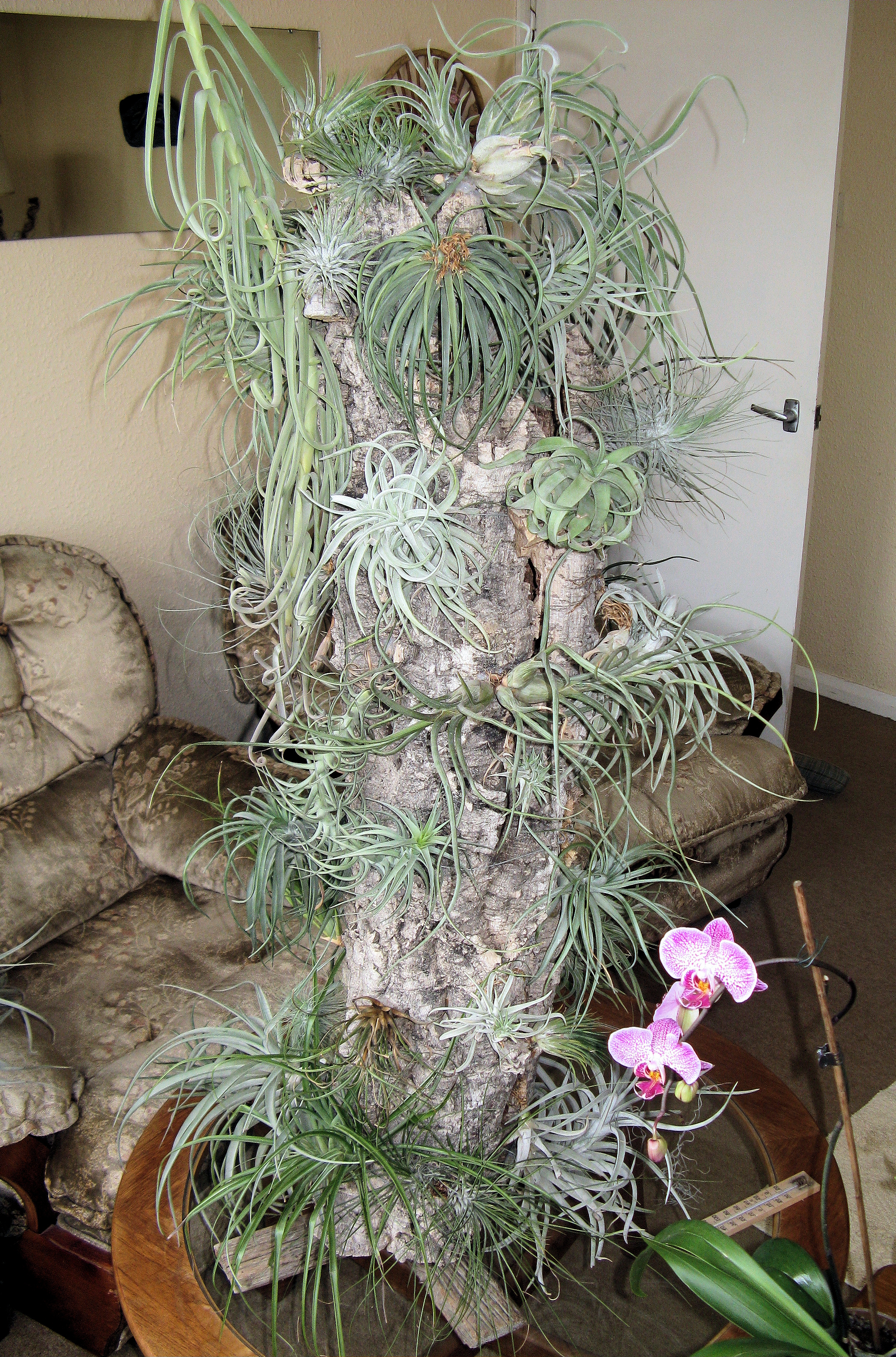
Tillandsia airplants mounted on the bark of a cork oak

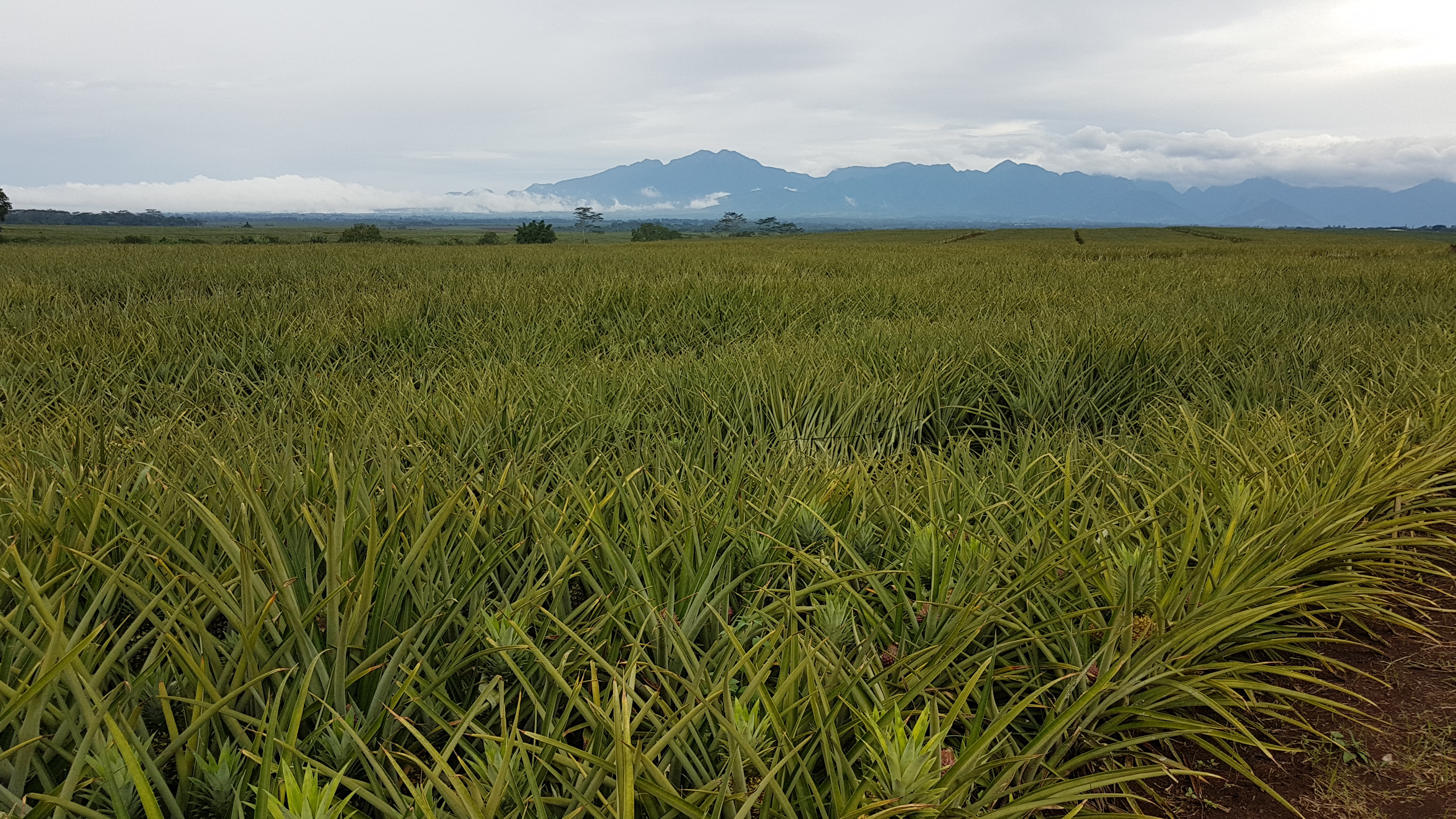
A plantation of pineapple (Ananas comosus) plants in Bukidnon, the Philippines

== Distribution and habitat ==
Plants in the Bromeliaceae are widely represented in their natural climates across the Americas. One species (Pitcairnia feliciana) can be found in Africa. They can be found at altitudes from sea level to 4,200 meters, from rainforests to deserts. 1,814 species are epiphytes, some are lithophytes, and some are terrestrial. Accordingly, these plants can be found in the Andean highlands, from northern Chile to Colombia, in the Sechura Desert of coastal Peru, in the cloud forests of Central and South America, in southern United States from southern Virginia to Florida to Texas, and in far southern Arizona.

== Ecology ==
Bromeliads often serve as phytotelmata, accumulating water between their leaves. One study found 175,000 bromeliads per hectare (2.5 acres) in one forest; that many bromeliads can hold 50,000 L (11,000 imp gal; 13,000 US gal) of water. The aquatic habitat created as a result is host to a diverse array of invertebrates, especially aquatic insect larvae, including those of mosquitos. These bromeliad invertebrates benefit their hosts by increasing nitrogen uptake into the plant. A study of 209 plants from the Yasuní Scientific Reserve in Ecuador identified 11,219 animals, representing more than 350 distinct species, many of which are found only on bromeliads. Examples include some species of ostracods, small salamanders about 2.5 cm (1 in) in length, and tree frogs. Jamaican bromeliads are home to Metopaulias depressus, a reddish-brown crab 2 cm (0.8 in) across, which has evolved social behavior to protect its young from predation by Diceratobasis macrogaster, a species of damselfly whose larvae live in bromeliads. Some bromeliads even form homes for other species of bromeliads.

Trees or branches that have a higher incidence of sunlight tend to have more bromeliads. In contrast, the sectors facing west receive less sunlight and therefore fewer bromeliads. In addition, thicker trees have more bromeliads, possibly because they are older and have greater structural complexity.

== Cultivation and uses ==
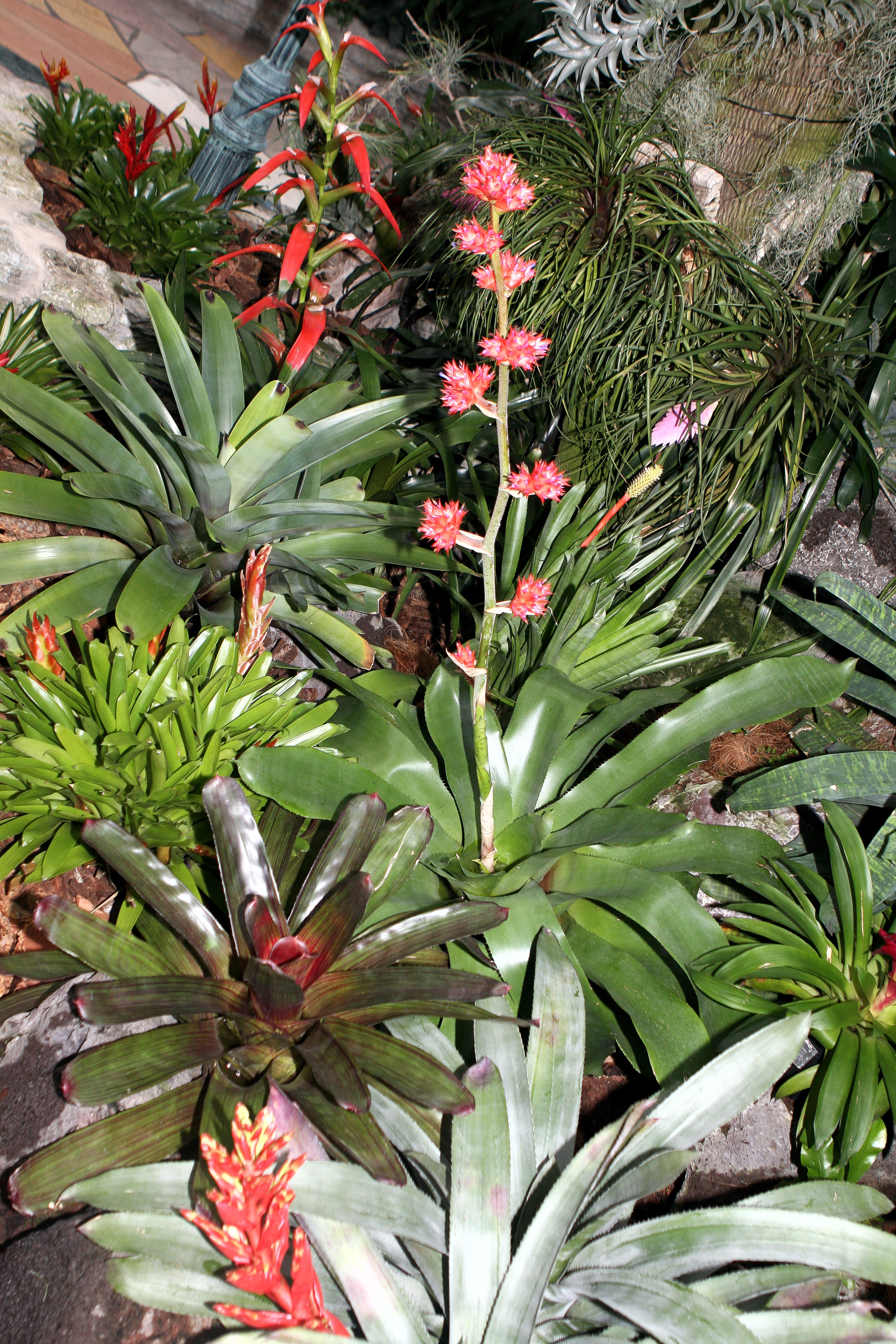
Bromeliaceae mixed cultivated collection

Humans have been using bromeliads for thousands of years. The Incas, Aztecs, Maya and others used them for food, protection, fiber and ceremony, just as they are still used today. European interest began when Spanish conquistadors returned with pineapple, which became so popular as an exotic food that the image of the pineapple was adapted into European art and sculpture. In 1776, the species Guzmania lingulata was introduced to Europe, causing a sensation among gardeners unfamiliar with such a plant. In 1828, Aechmea fasciata was brought to Europe, followed by Vriesea splendens in 1840. These transplants were so successful, they are still among the most widely grown bromeliad varieties.

In the 19th century, breeders in Belgium, France and the Netherlands started hybridizing plants for wholesale trade. Many exotic varieties were produced until World War I, which halted breeding programs and led to the loss of some species. The plants experienced a resurgence of popularity after World War II. Since then, Dutch, Belgian and North American nurseries have greatly expanded bromeliad production.

Only one bromeliad, the pineapple (Ananas comosus), is a commercially important food crop. Bromelain, a common ingredient in meat tenderizer, is extracted from pineapple stems. Many other bromeliads are popular ornamental plants, grown as both garden and houseplants.

Bromeliads are important food plants for many peoples. For example, the Pima of Mexico occasionally consume flowers of Tillandsia erubescens and T. recurvata due to their high sugar content; in Argentina and Bolivia, the shoot apices of T. rubella and T. maxima are consumed; in Venezuela, indigenous coastal tribes eat a sour-tasting but sweet-smelling berry, known as 'Maya', of Bromelia chrysantha as a fruit or in fermented beverages; in Chile, the sweet fruit of Greigia sphacelata, known as 'chupones', is consumed raw.

=== Collectors ===
Édouard André was a French collector/explorer whose many discoveries of bromeliads in the Cordilleras of South America would be influential on horticulturists to follow. He served as a source of inspiration to 20th-century collectors, in particular Mulford B. Foster and Lyman Smith of the United States and Werner Rauh of Germany and Michelle Jenkins of Australia.

== See also ==
- List of foliage plant diseases (Bromeliaceae)
