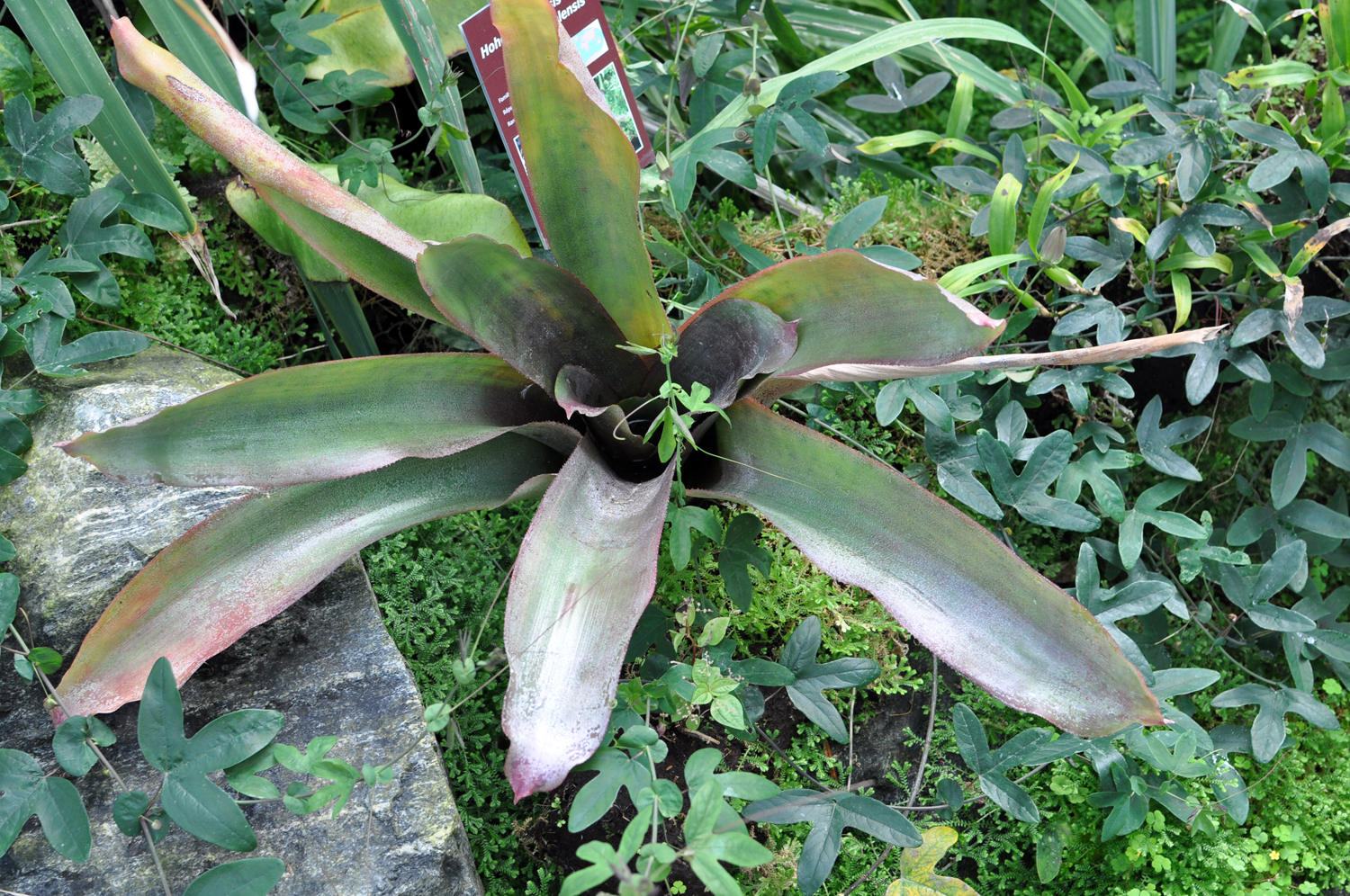

Scientific classification
- Kingdom: Plantae
- Clade: Tracheophytes
- Clade: Angiosperms
- Clade: Monocots
- Clade: Commelinids
- Order: Poales
- Family: Bromeliaceae
- Subfamily: Bromelioideae
- Genus: Hohenbergiopsis; L.B. Smith & R.W. Read
- Species: H. guatemalensis

Binomial name
- Hohenbergiopsis guatemalensis (L.B. Smith) L.B. Smith & R.W. Read

Synonyms
- Hohenbergia guatemalensis L.B.Sm.

= Hohenbergiopsis =

Genus of flowering plants

Hohenbergiopsis is a genus of plants in the family Bromeliaceae, subfamily Bromelioideae. The genus name is from the genus Hohenbergia and the Greek opsis (resembling) because it resembles the genus Hohenbergia. It contains only one known species, Hohenbergiopsis guatemalensis, native to Oaxaca, Chiapas, and Guatemala.
