= Fernseea itatiaiae =

Scientific classification
- Kingdom: Plantae
- Clade: Tracheophytes
- Clade: Angiosperms
- Clade: Monocots
- Clade: Commelinids
- Order: Poales
- Family: Bromeliaceae
- Genus: Fernseea
- Species: F. itatiaiae

Binomial name
- Fernseea itatiaiae (Wawra) Baker

Synonyms
- Aechmea stenophylla Baker; Bromelia itatiaiae Wawra

Species of plant

Fernseea itatiaiae is a species of flowering plant in the Bromeliaceae family. The bromeliad is endemic to the Atlantic Forest biome (Mata Atlantica Brasileira), located in southeastern Brazil. It is native within Minas Gerais, Rio de Janeiro (state), and São Paulo (state).
