= H. ridleyi =

H. ridleyi may refer to:

- Hipposideros ridleyi, the Ridley's roundleaf bat, a horseshoe bat species found in Malaysia and Singapore
- Hohenbergia ridleyi, a Bromeliaceae plant species endemic to Brazil
- Hyperaulax ridleyi, a tropical air-breathing land snail species

== See also ==
- Henry Nicholas Ridley
