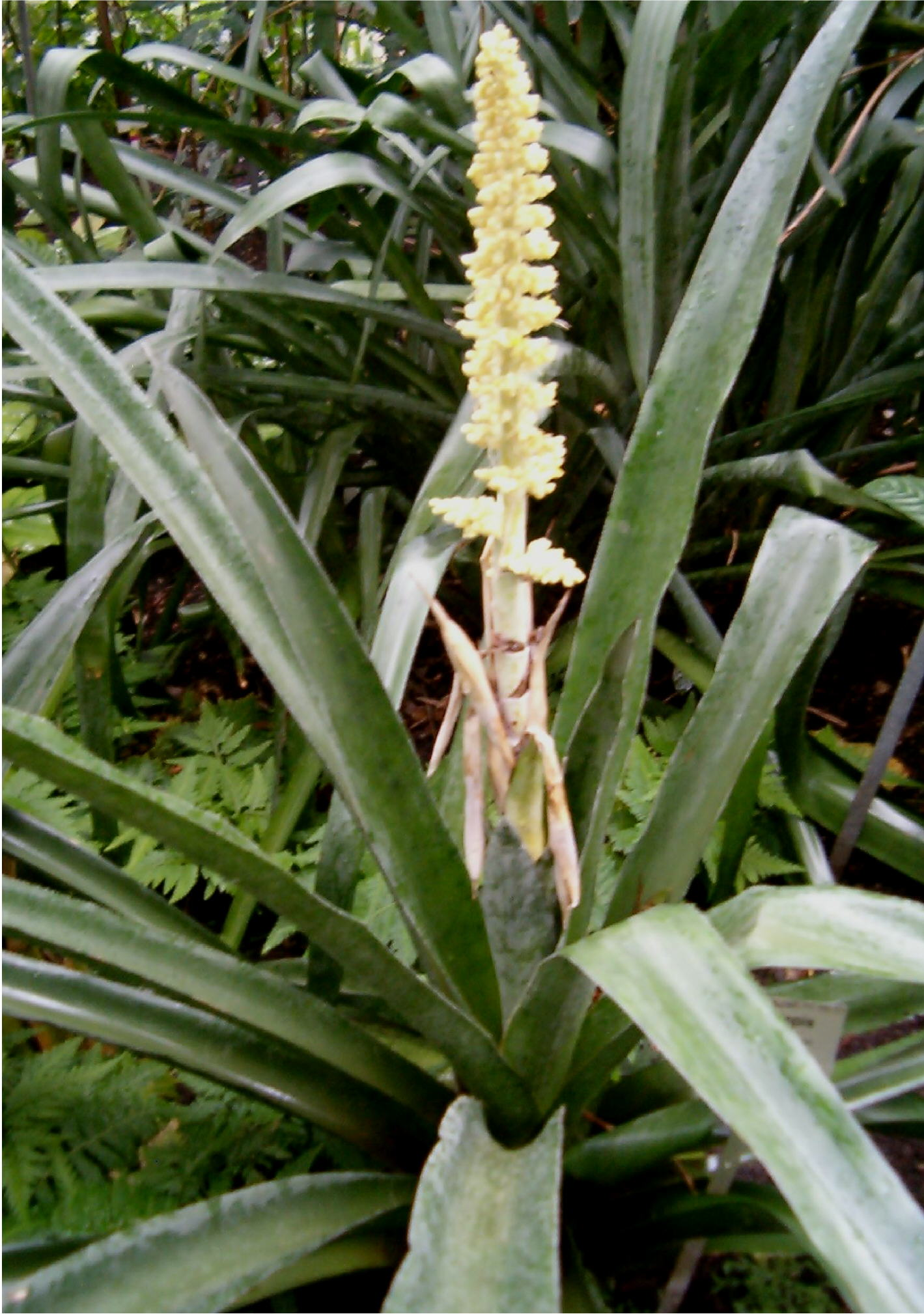

Scientific classification
- Kingdom: Plantae
- Clade: Tracheophytes
- Clade: Angiosperms
- Clade: Monocots
- Clade: Commelinids
- Order: Poales
- Family: Bromeliaceae
- Genus: Androlepis
- Species: A. skinneri

Binomial name
- Androlepis skinneri (K.Koch) Brongn. ex Houllet

Synonyms
- Pothuava skinneri K.Koch; Aechmea skinneri (K.Koch) Baker; Aechmea leucostachys Baker; Aechmea donnell-smithii Baker; Androlepis donnell-smithii (Baker) Mez

= Androlepis skinneri =

Species of epiphyte

Androlepis skinneri is a species of flowering plant in the family Bromeliaceae. It is native to southern Mexico (Veracruz, Chiapas, Tabasco) and Central America (Belize, Guatemala, Honduras, Nicaragua). This is one of the few Bromelioideae species that is dioecious.

== Cultivars ==
- × Androlaechmea 'Crateriformis'
- × Androlaechmea 'Cyclops'
- × Androlaechmea 'Dean'
- × Androlaechmea 'O'Rourke'
- × Androlaechmea 'Sampson'
