= Hohenbergia augusta =

Scientific classification
- Kingdom: Plantae
- Clade: Tracheophytes
- Clade: Angiosperms
- Clade: Monocots
- Clade: Commelinids
- Order: Poales
- Family: Bromeliaceae
- Genus: Hohenbergia
- Species: H. augusta

Binomial name
- Hohenbergia augusta (Vell.) É.Morren

Synonyms
- Aechmea augusta (Vell.) Baker; Aechmea eburnea Baker; Aechmea glomerata (Gaudich. ex K.Koch) Hook.f.; Aechmea multiceps Baker; Canistrum eburneum É.Morren; Canistrum fragrans (Linden) Mabb.; Guzmania fragrans Linden; Hohenbergia ferruginea Carrière; Hohenbergia glomerata (Gaudich. ex K.Koch) Baker; Hoplophytum augustum (Vell.) Beer; Pironneava glomerata Gaudich. ex K.Koch; Tillandsia augusta Vell.

Species of flowering plant

Hohenbergia augusta is a plant species in the genus Hohenbergia. It is an epiphyte or perennial endemic to southeastern and southern Brazil, from Espírito Santo to Santa Catarina.
