= Fernseea bocainensis =

Scientific classification
- Kingdom: Plantae
- Clade: Tracheophytes
- Clade: Angiosperms
- Clade: Monocots
- Clade: Commelinids
- Order: Poales
- Family: Bromeliaceae
- Genus: Fernseea
- Species: F. bocainensis

Binomial name
- Fernseea bocainensis E.Pereira & Moutinho

Species of flowering plant

Fernseea bocainensis is a plant species in the genus Fernseea.

This bromeliad is endemic to the Atlantic Forest biome (Mata Atlantica Brasileira) and to Rio de Janeiro (state) and São Paulo (state), located in southeastern Brazil.
