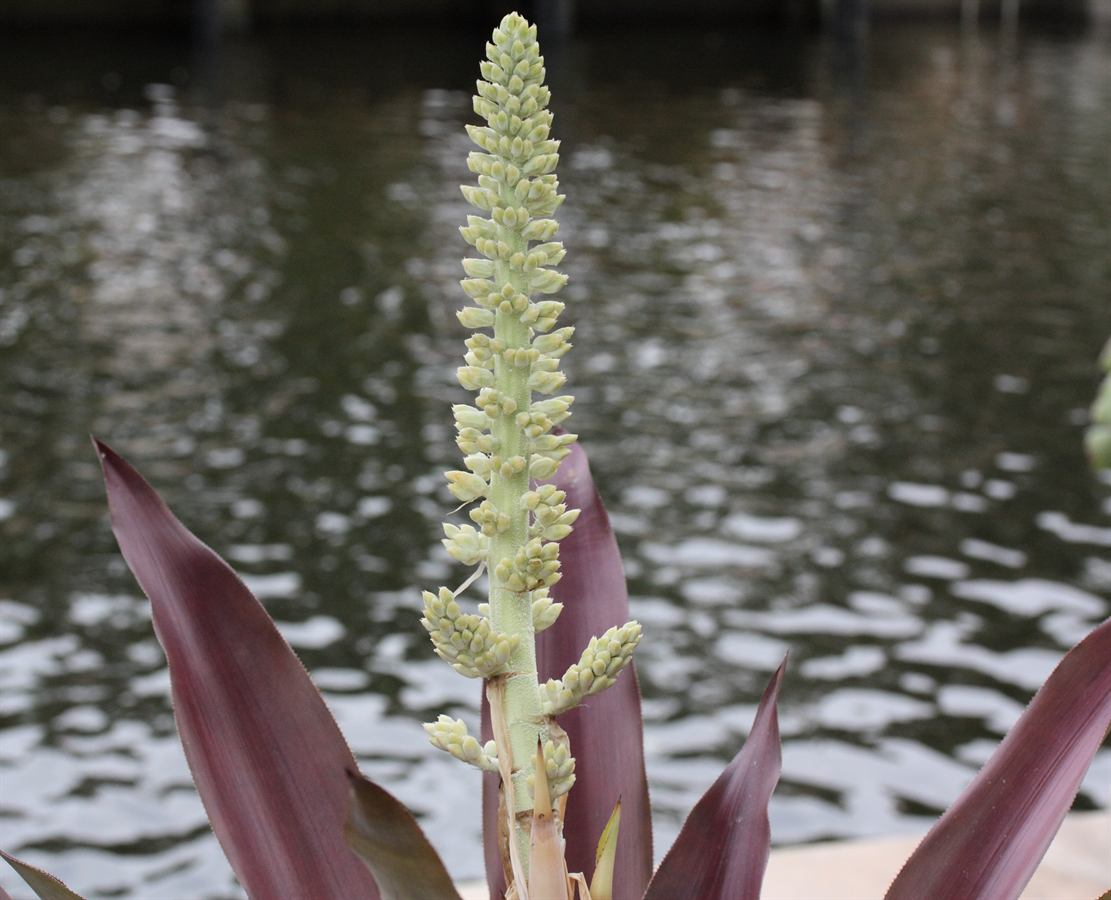
- Androlepis skinneri

Scientific classification
- Kingdom: Plantae
- Clade: Embryophytes
- Clade: Tracheophytes
- Clade: Spermatophytes
- Clade: Angiosperms
- Clade: Monocots
- Clade: Commelinids
- Order: Poales
- Family: Bromeliaceae
- Subfamily: Bromelioideae
- Genus: Androlepis; Brongn. ex Houllet

Type species
- Androlepis skinneri

= Androlepis =

Genus of flowering plants

Androlepis is a genus of epiphytes in the botanical family Bromeliaceae, subfamily Bromelioideae, native to Central America and southern Mexico. The genus name is from the Greek “andros” (man) and “lepis” (scale).

== Species ==
| Image | Scientific name | Native Distribution |
|---|---|---|
| | Androlepis fragrans Leme & H.Luther | Veracruz |
| | Androlepis skinneri (K. Koch) Brongniart ex Houllet | from Veracruz to Nicaragua |
