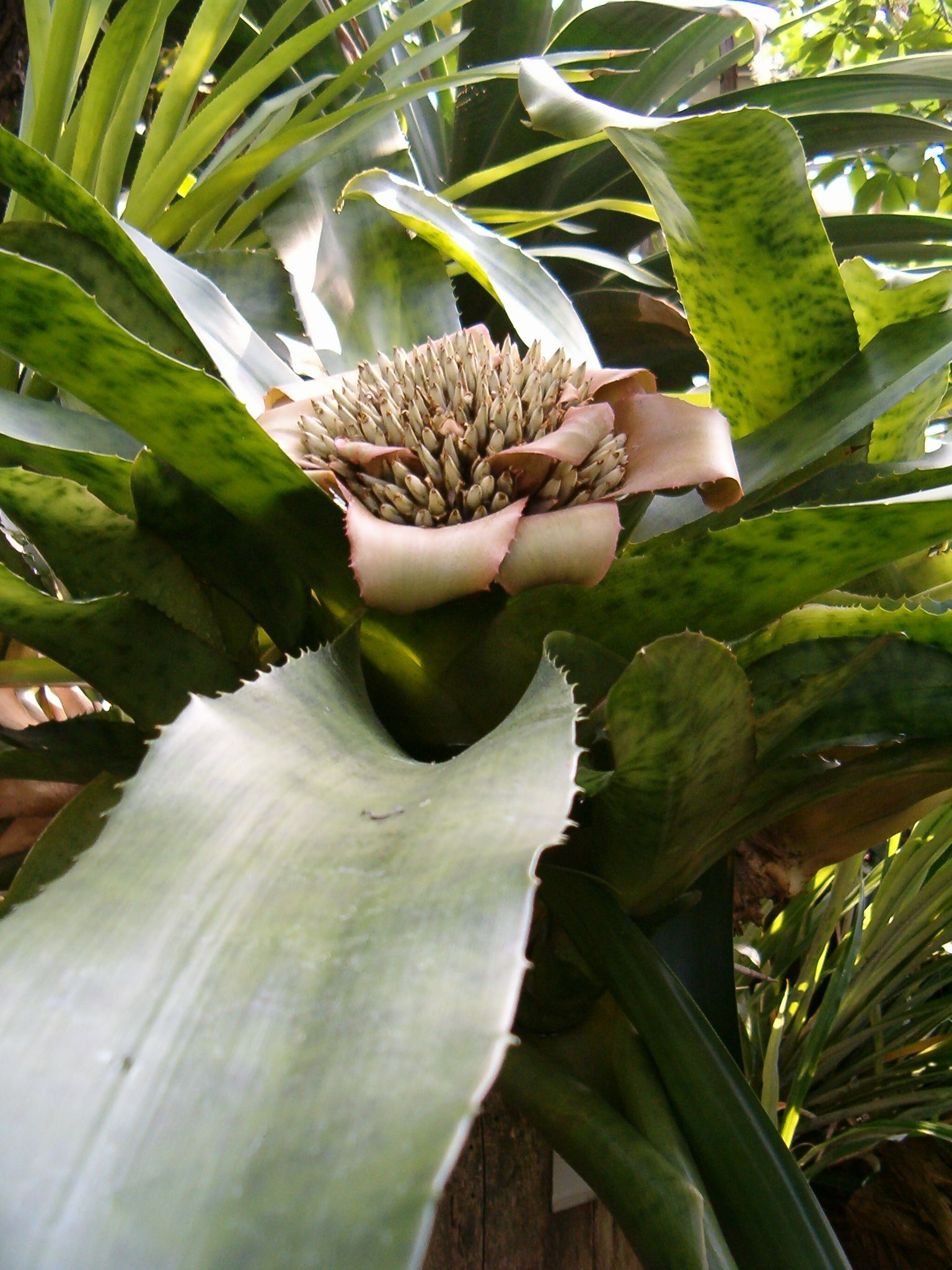
- Edmundoa lindenii

Scientific classification
- Kingdom: Plantae
- Clade: Tracheophytes
- Clade: Angiosperms
- Clade: Monocots
- Clade: Commelinids
- Order: Poales
- Family: Bromeliaceae
- Subfamily: Bromelioideae
- Genus: Edmundoa; Leme

= Edmundoa =

Genus of flowering plants

Edmundoa is a genus of flowering plants in the family Bromeliaceae, subfamily Bromelioideae. It is native to southern and south-eastern Brasil.

The genus is named for Edmundo Pereira, Brazilian botanist (1914–1986), from the Botanical Garden in Rio de Janeiro.

It is recognized as an independent genus, as it was before 1997, it was grouped earlier with Canistrum.

The genus was circumscribed by Elton Martinez Carvalho Leme in Canistrum - Bromeliads Atlantic Forest on page 42 in 1997, and it was noted earlier in Taxon vol.36 (Issue 1) on page 330 in 1987.

== Species ==
- Edmundoa ambigua (Wanderley & Leme) Leme
- Edmundoa lindenii (Regel) Leme
  - var. rosea (E.Morren) Leme
- Edmundoa perplexa (L.B.Smith) Leme
