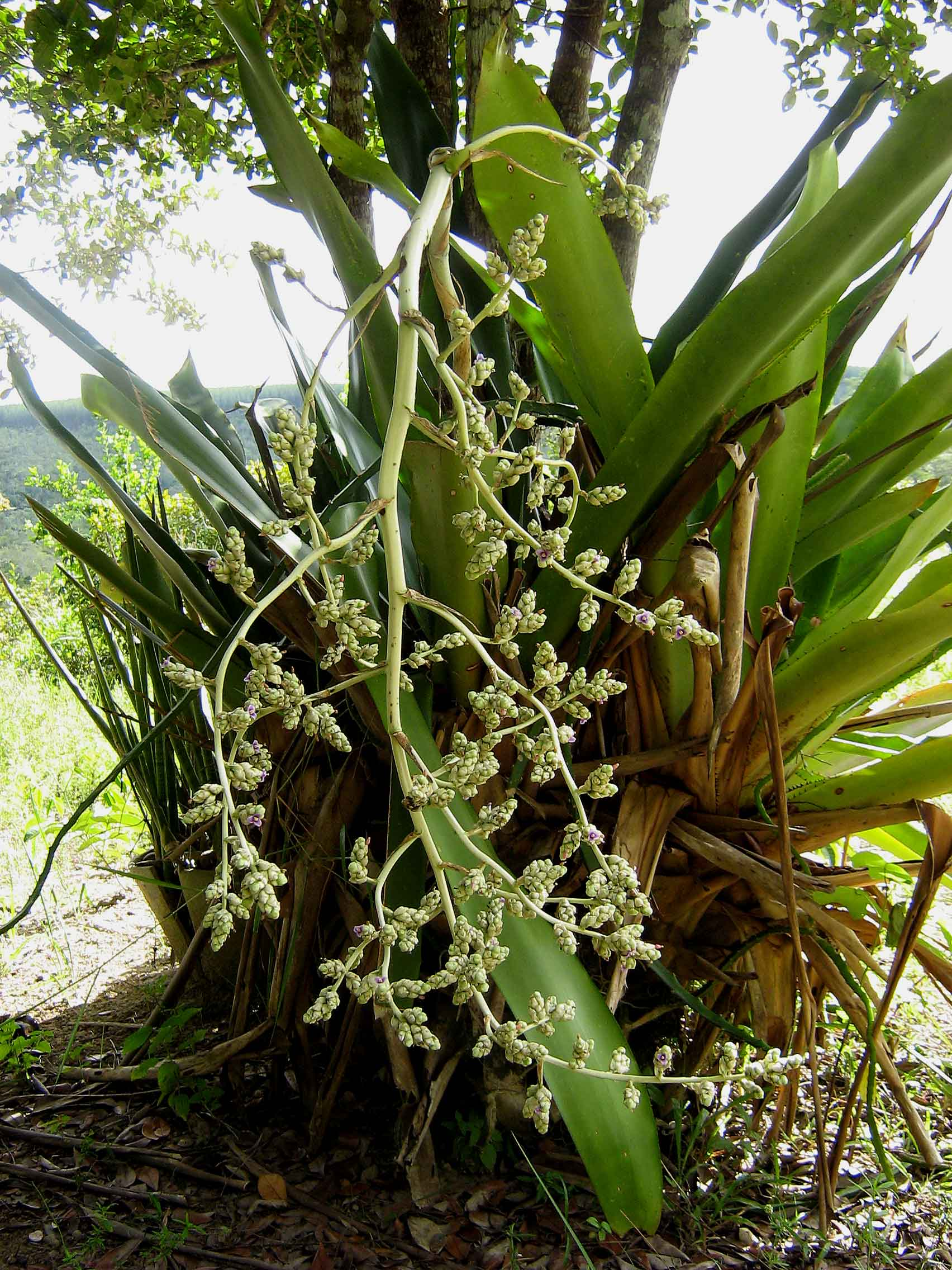

Scientific classification
- Kingdom: Plantae
- Clade: Tracheophytes
- Clade: Angiosperms
- Clade: Monocots
- Clade: Commelinids
- Order: Poales
- Family: Bromeliaceae
- Genus: Hohenbergia
- Species: H. blanchetii

Binomial name
- Hohenbergia blanchetii (Baker) É.Morren ex Mez

Synonyms
- Aechmea blanchetii Baker

= Hohenbergia blanchetii =

Species of plant

Hohenbergia blanchetii is a species of flowering plant in the Bromeliaceae family. It is an epiphyte endemic to eastern Brazil, ranging from Pernambuco to Espírito Santo.
