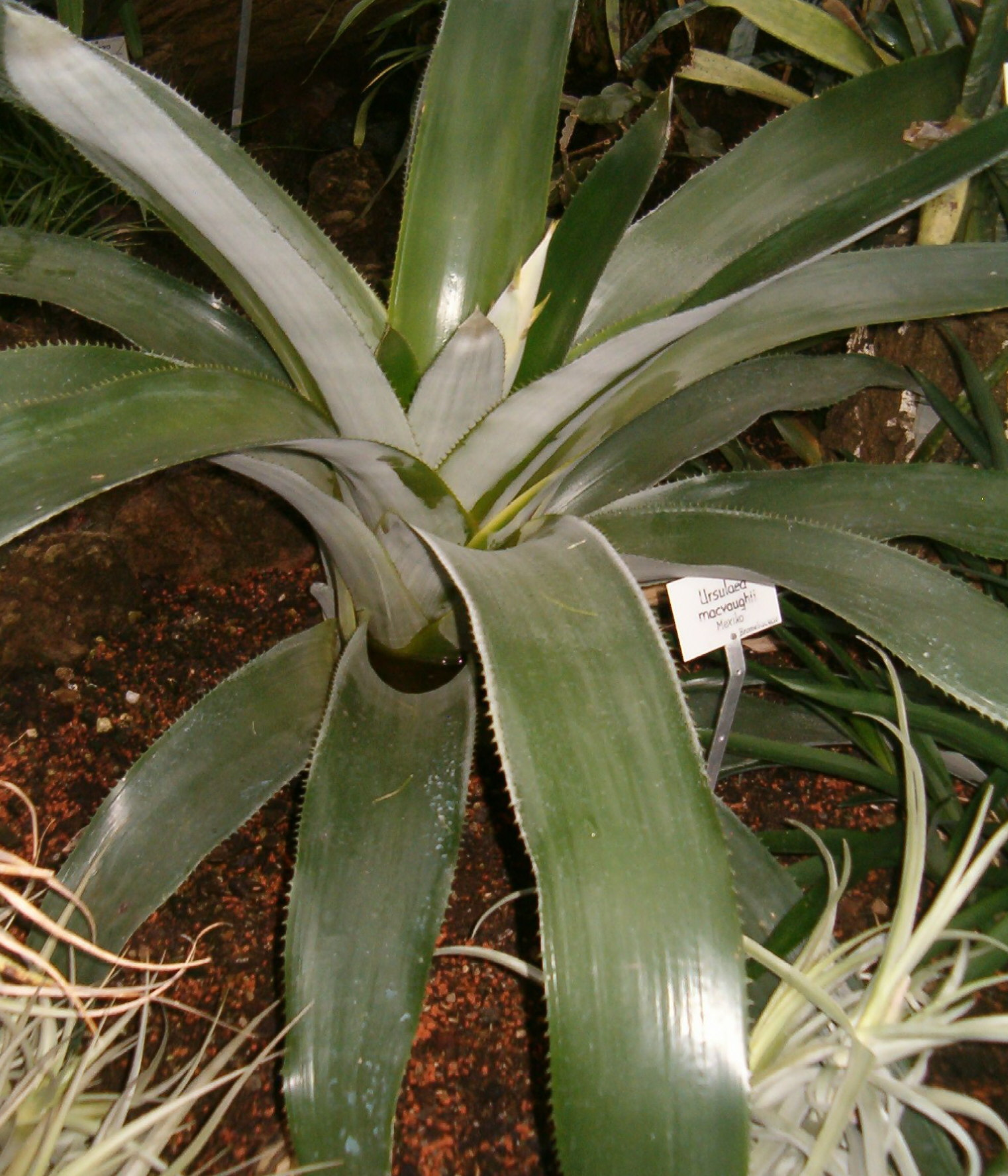
- U. macvaughii

Scientific classification
- Kingdom: Plantae
- Clade: Tracheophytes
- Clade: Angiosperms
- Clade: Monocots
- Clade: Commelinids
- Order: Poales
- Family: Bromeliaceae
- Subfamily: Bromelioideae
- Genus: Ursulaea; Read & Baensch

Species
- See text

Synonyms
- Aechmea

= Ursulaea =

Genus of flowering plants

Ursulaea (named for Ursula Baensch, plant breeder and co-author of Blooming Bromeliads) is a genus in the plant family Bromeliaceae, subfamily Bromelioideae. Some authorities treat Ursulaea as a synonym of Aechmea. There are two known species, both endemic to Mexico.

== Species ==
Image	Name	Distribution
	Ursulaea macvaughii (L.B. Smith) R.W. Read & H.U. Baensch	Mexico (southern Jalisco through Colima to western Michoacán).
	Ursulaea tuitensis (Magaña & E.J. Lott) R.W. Read & H.U. Baensch	Mexico (Jalisco).
