= Hohenbergia minor =

Scientific classification
- Kingdom: Plantae
- Clade: Tracheophytes
- Clade: Angiosperms
- Clade: Monocots
- Clade: Commelinids
- Order: Poales
- Family: Bromeliaceae
- Genus: Hohenbergia
- Species: H. minor

Binomial name
- Hohenbergia minor L.B.Sm.

Species of flowering plant

Hohenbergia minor is a plant species in the genus Hohenbergia. This species is endemic to Brazil.
