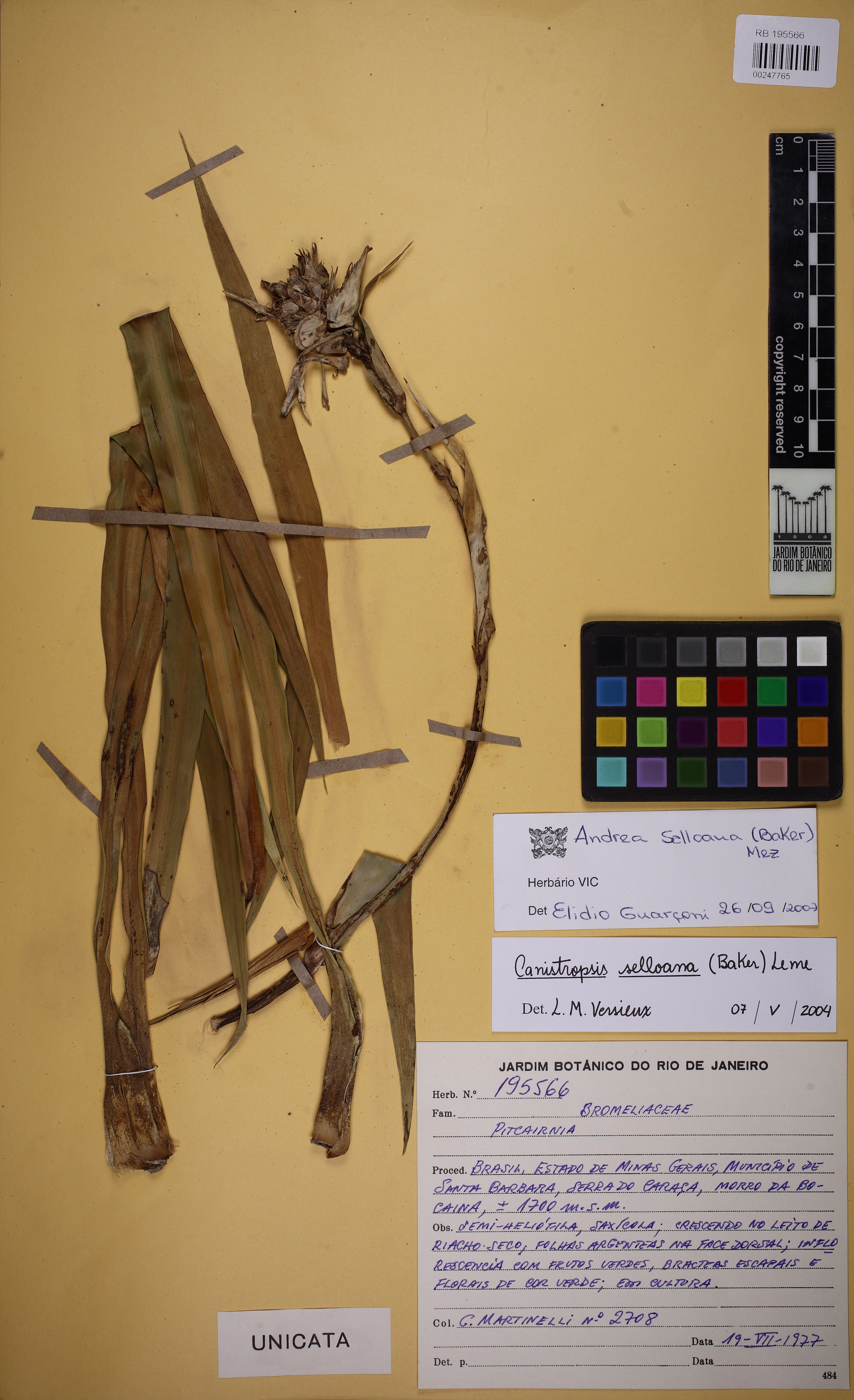

Scientific classification
- Kingdom: Plantae
- Clade: Tracheophytes
- Clade: Angiosperms
- Clade: Monocots
- Clade: Commelinids
- Order: Poales
- Family: Bromeliaceae
- Subfamily: Bromelioideae
- Genus: Eduandrea; Leme, W.Till, G.K.Br., J.R.Grant & Govaerts
- Species: E. selloana

Binomial name
- Eduandrea selloana (Baker) Leme, W. Till, G.K. Brown, J.R. Grant & Govaerts

Synonyms
- Andrea Mez; Andrea selloana (Baker) Mez (1896)

= Eduandrea =

Species of plant

Eduandrea is a monotypic genus plants in the family Bromeliaceae, subfamily Bromelioideae.

== Taxonomy ==
It contains a single species, Eduandrea selloana.

The former genus Andrea has been ruled invalid and renamed Eduandrea in honor of the collector Édouard André (1840-1911).

== Distribution ==
The bromeliad species Eduandrea selloana is endemic to Minas Gerais state, within the Atlantic Forest biome (Mata Atlantica Brasileira), located in southeastern Brazil.

The plant is a critically endangered species in its Bahian habitats.
