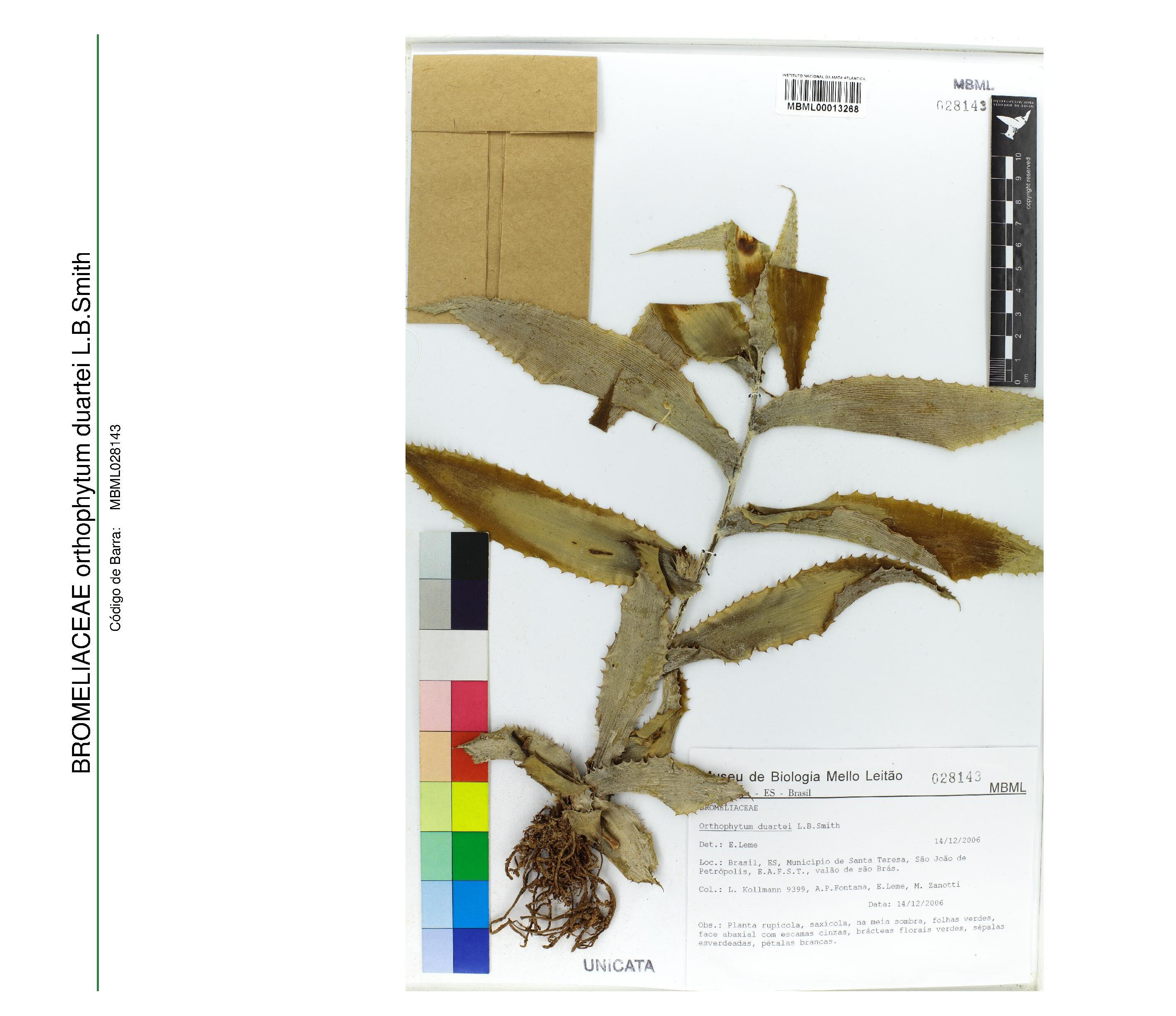
- Orthophytum duartei

Scientific classification
- Kingdom: Plantae
- Clade: Embryophytes
- Clade: Tracheophytes
- Clade: Spermatophytes
- Clade: Angiosperms
- Clade: Monocots
- Clade: Commelinids
- Order: Poales
- Family: Bromeliaceae
- Subfamily: Bromelioideae
- Genus: Lapanthus; Louzada & Versieux

= Lapanthus =

Genus of plants

Lapanthus is a genus of flowering plants belonging to the family Bromeliaceae. Its native range is Minas Gerais (Brazil).

Species:

- Lapanthus duartei (L.B.Sm.) Louzada & Versieux
- Lapanthus itambensis (Versieux & Leme) Louzada & Versieux
