= Hohenbergia flava =

Scientific classification
- Kingdom: Plantae
- Clade: Tracheophytes
- Clade: Angiosperms
- Clade: Monocots
- Clade: Commelinids
- Order: Poales
- Family: Bromeliaceae
- Genus: Hohenbergia
- Species: H. flava

Binomial name
- Hohenbergia flava Leme & Paula

Species of flowering plant

Hohenbergia flava is a plant species in the genus Hohenbergia. This species is endemic to Brazil.
