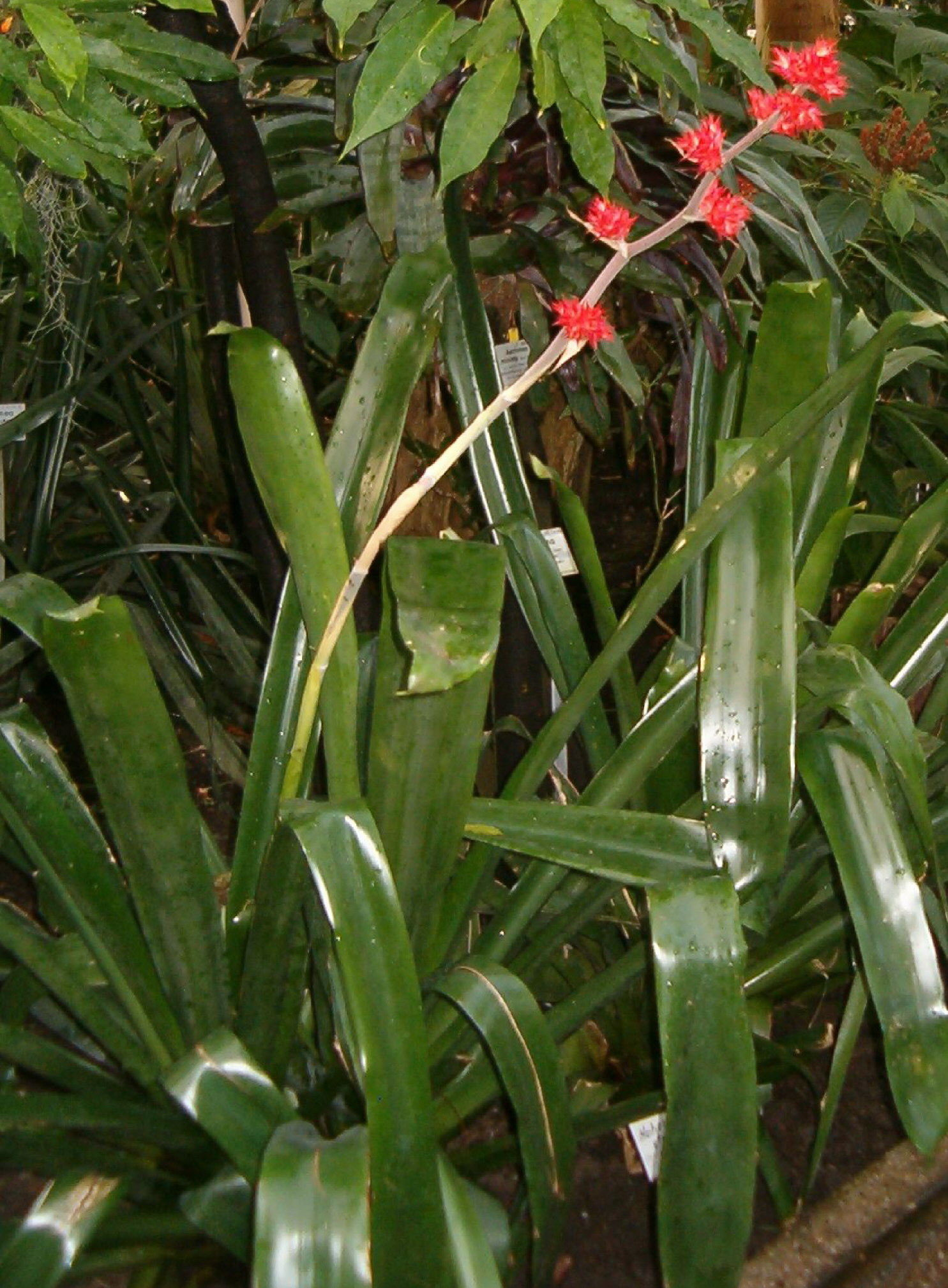

Scientific classification
- Kingdom: Plantae
- Clade: Tracheophytes
- Clade: Angiosperms
- Clade: Monocots
- Clade: Commelinids
- Order: Poales
- Family: Bromeliaceae
- Genus: Hohenbergia
- Species: H. stellata

Binomial name
- Hohenbergia stellata Schult. & Schult.f.

Synonyms
- Hohenbergia erythrostachya Brongn.; Pironneava roseocoerulea K.Koch; Pironneava morreniana Regel; Aechmea glomerata var. pallida Baker; Aechmea longisepala Baker; Aechmea oligosphaera Baker; Hohenbergia oligosphaera (Baker) Mez

= Hohenbergia stellata =

Species of flowering plant, native to South America and the Caribbean

Hohenbergia stellata is a perennial species of the genus Hohenbergia. It is native to Trinidad and Tobago, Martinique, Netherlands Antilles, Venezuela, and northeastern Brazil (Alagoas, Bahia, Piauí etc.).

Hohenbergia stellata exhibits sharp spines in its inflorescence. Flowers are purple-red and are present along the plant's strong stem, which grows up to 100 cm tall. In Brazil, this plant forms a microhabitat for the tarantula Pachistopelma bromelicola.

== Taxonomic status ==
Some research suggests that the Hohenbergia stellata may actually be more closely related to members of the genus Aechmea than to other species of Hohenbergia.

== Photo gallery ==
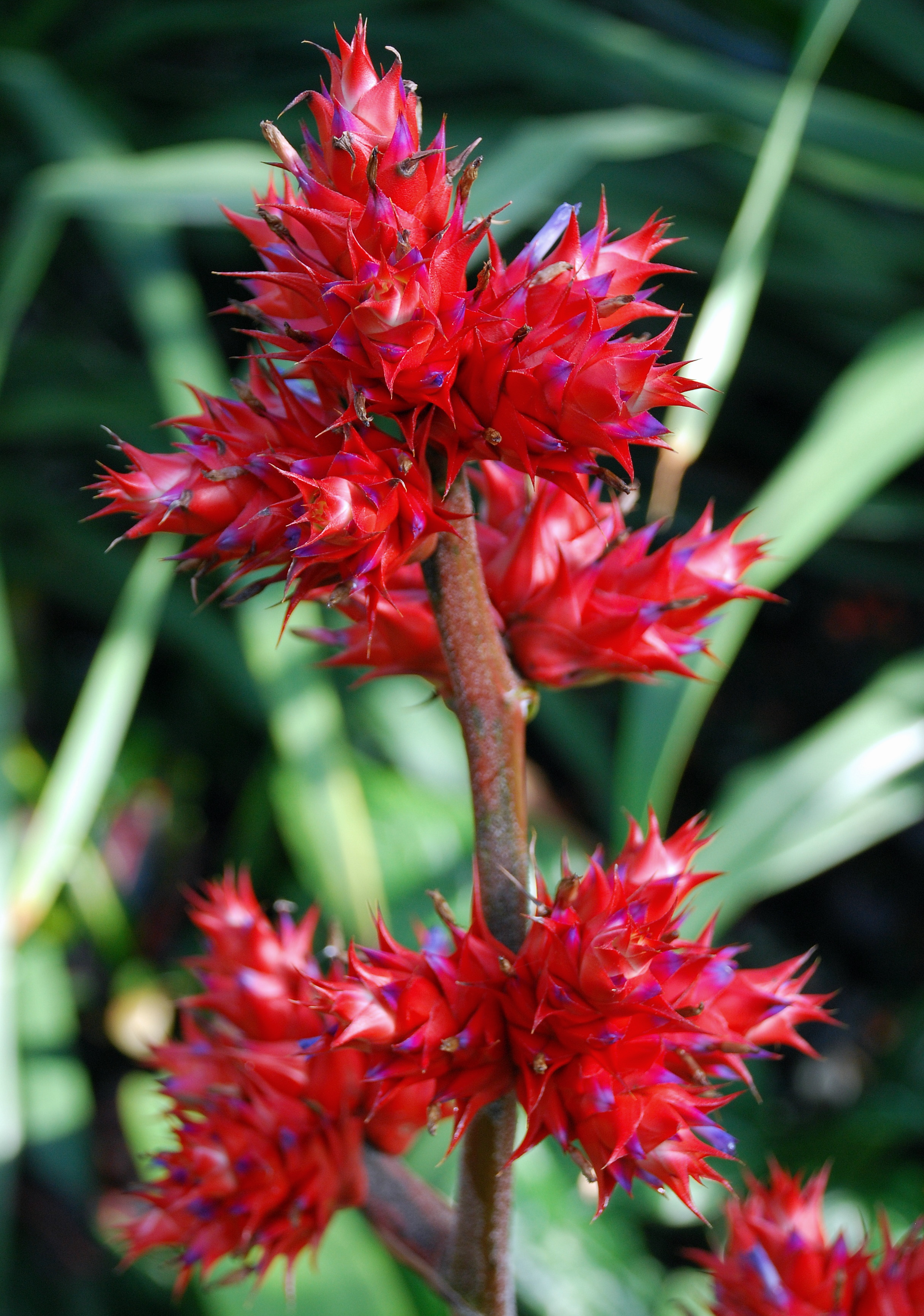

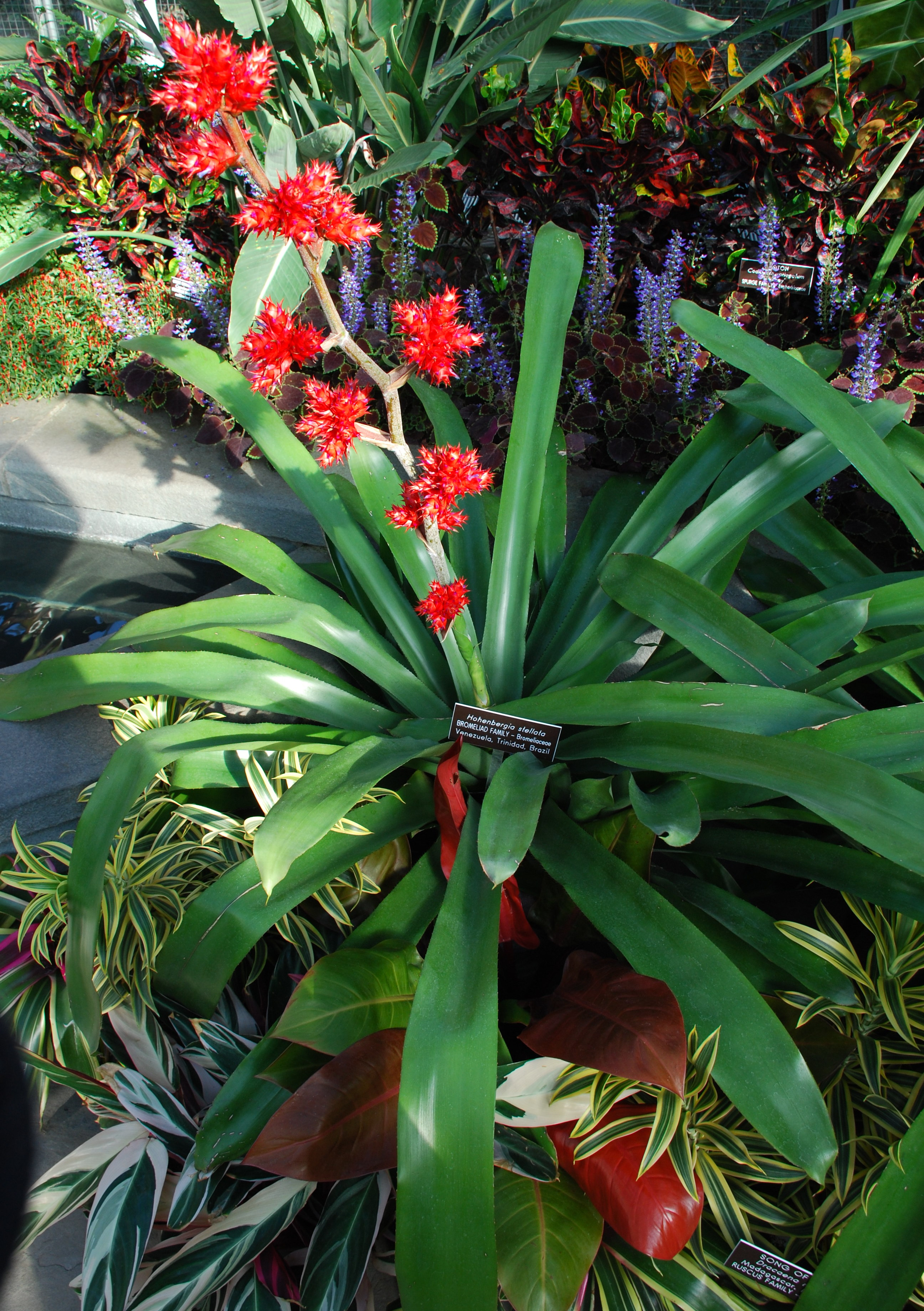

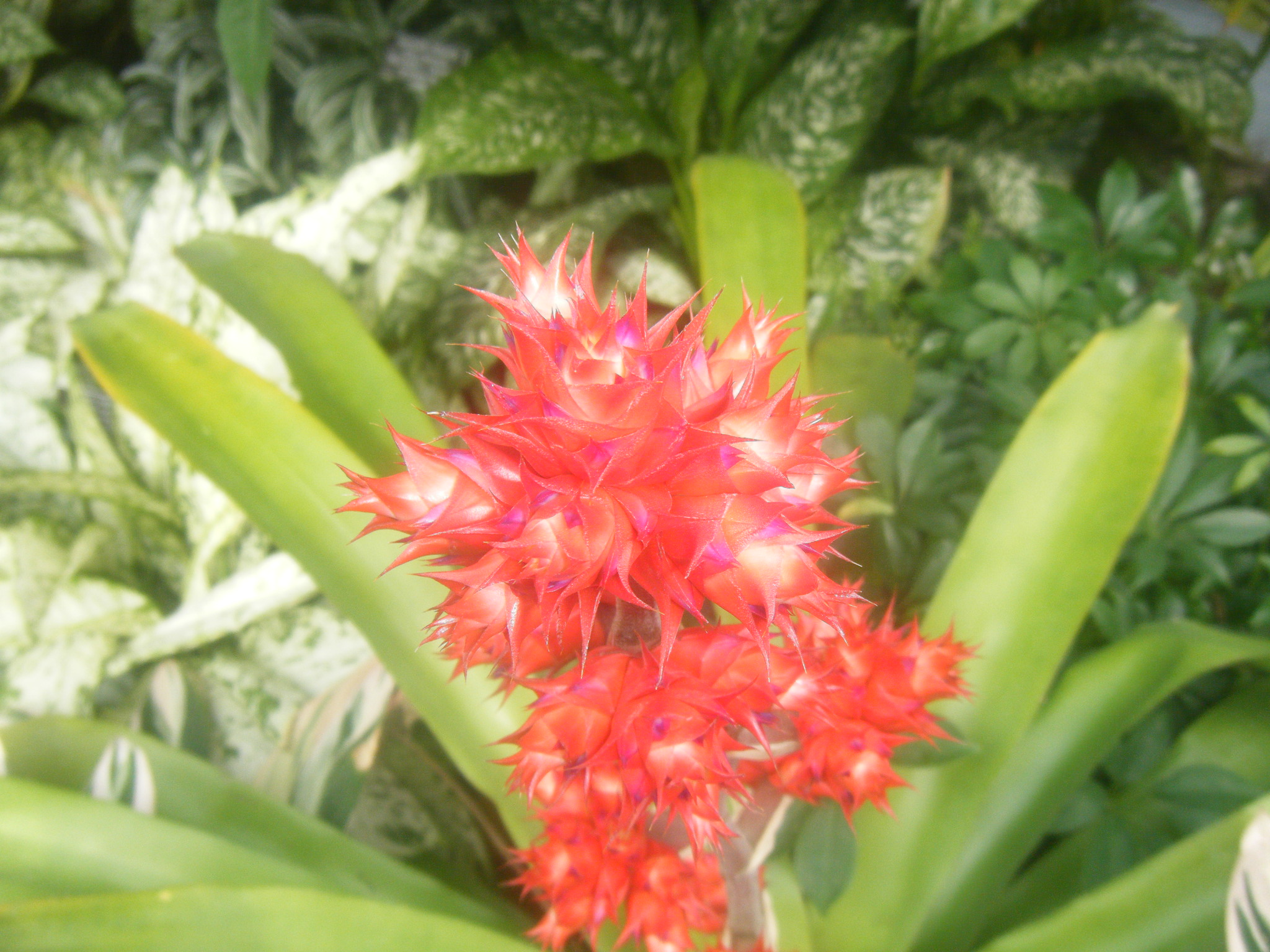

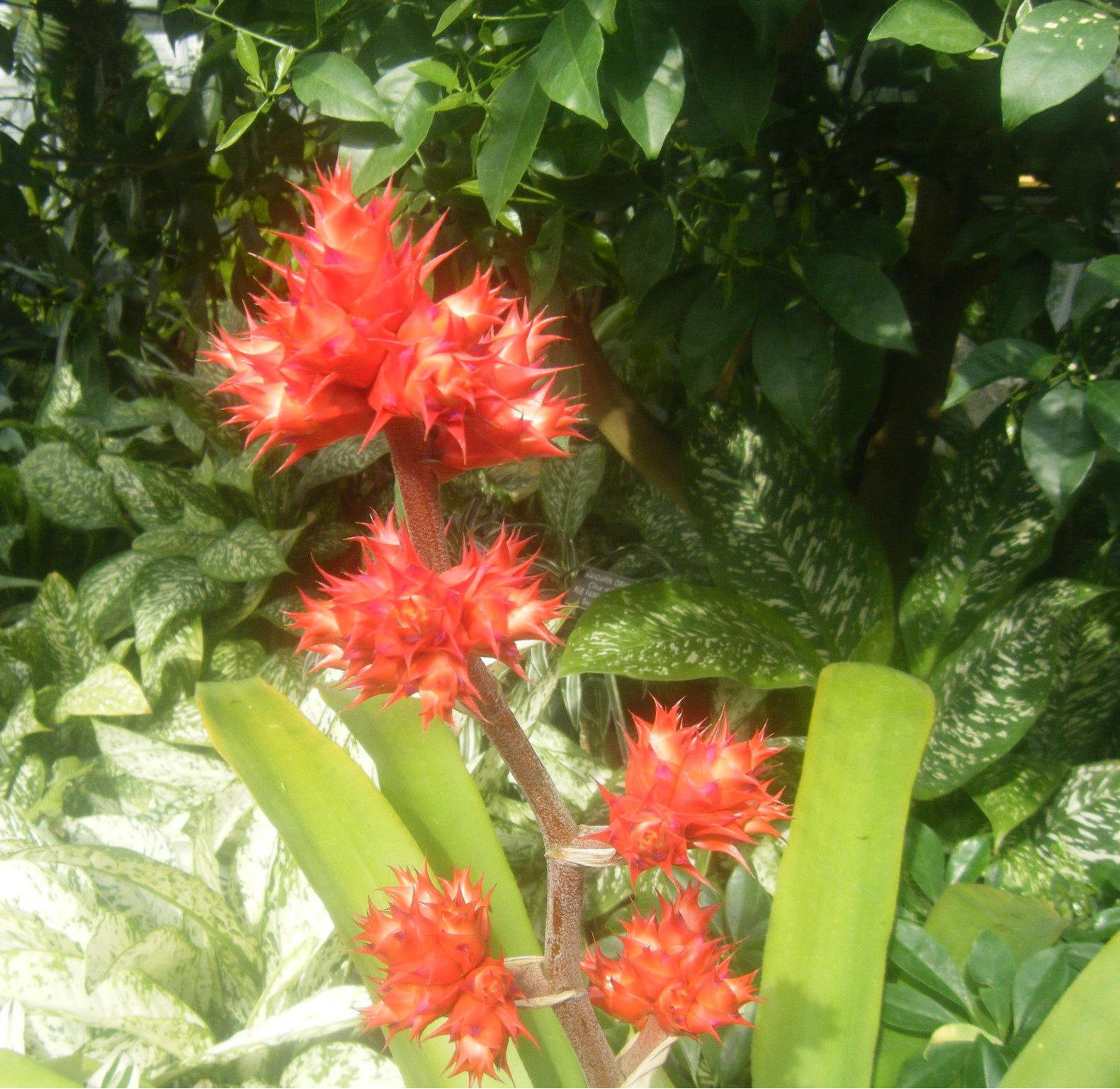

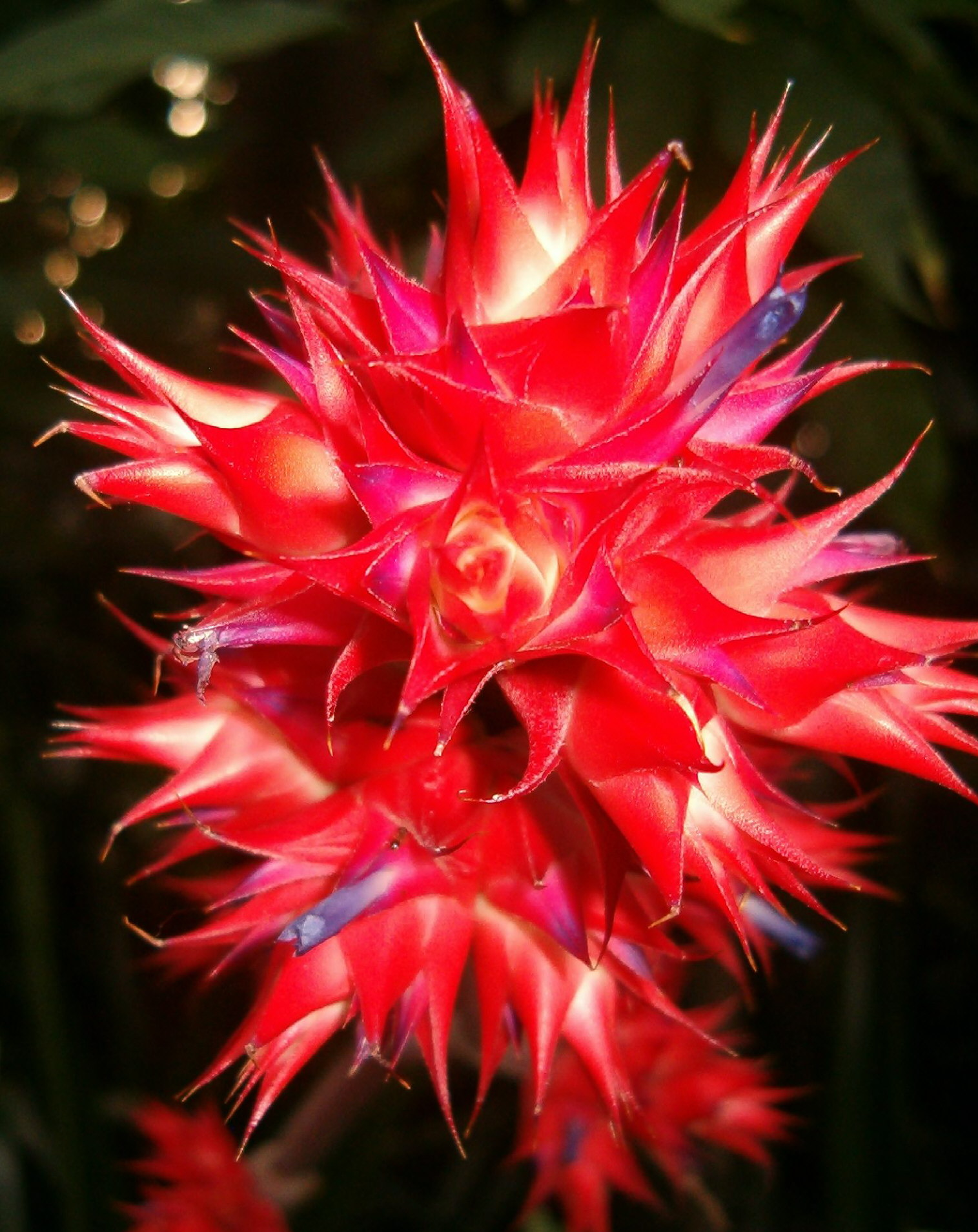
