= Pseudaechmea =

Scientific classification
- Kingdom: Plantae
- Clade: Tracheophytes
- Clade: Angiosperms
- Clade: Monocots
- Clade: Commelinids
- Order: Poales
- Family: Bromeliaceae
- Genus: Pseudaechmea; L.B.Sm. & Read
- Species: P. ambigua

Binomial name
- Pseudaechmea ambigua L.B.Sm. & Read

Synonyms
- Billbergia ambigua (L.B.Sm. & Read) Betancur & N.R.Salinas

Genus of plants

Pseudaechmea is a genus of the botanical family Bromeliaceae, subfamily Bromelioideae. The genus name is from the Greek pseudos (false) and the genus Aechmea. The genus was established by Lyman Smith and R.W. Read in 1982. The sole species is Pseudaechmea ambigua, treated as a synonym of Billbergia ambigua by Plants of the World Online as of November 2022.
