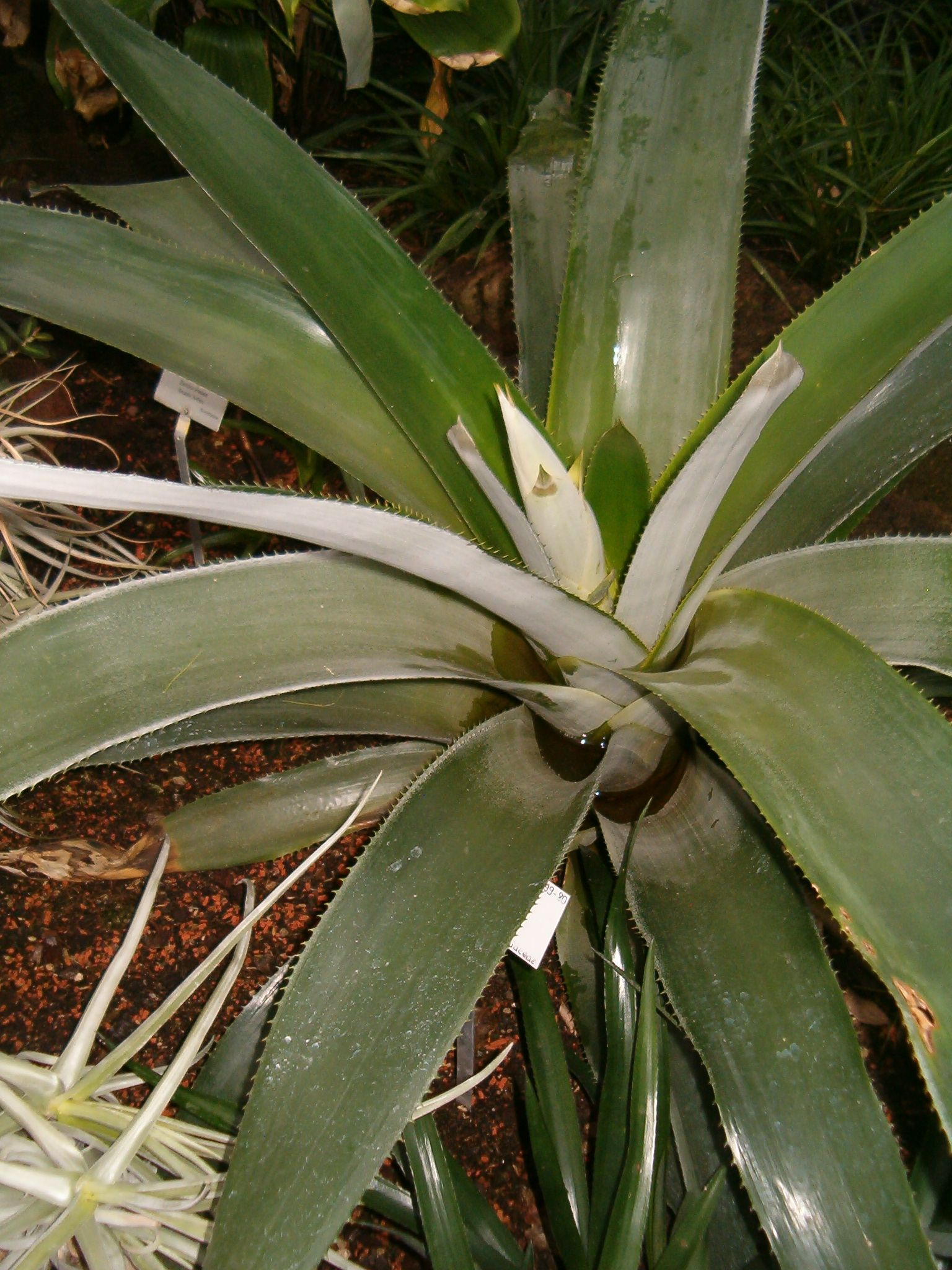

Scientific classification
- Kingdom: Plantae
- Clade: Tracheophytes
- Clade: Angiosperms
- Clade: Monocots
- Clade: Commelinids
- Order: Poales
- Family: Bromeliaceae
- Genus: Ursulaea
- Species: U. macvaughii

Binomial name
- Ursulaea macvaughii (L.B. Smith) R.W. Read & H.U. Baensch

= Ursulaea macvaughii =

Species of flowering plant

Ursulaea macvaughii is a plant species in the genus Ursulaea. This species is endemic to Mexico.
