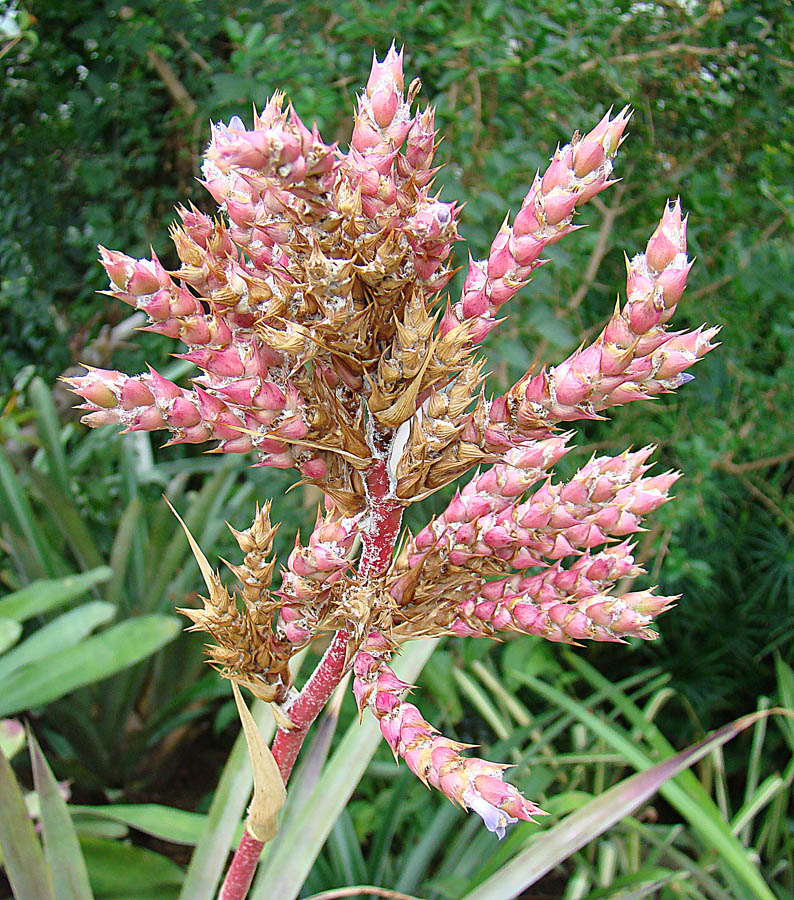

Scientific classification
- Kingdom: Plantae
- Clade: Tracheophytes
- Clade: Angiosperms
- Clade: Monocots
- Clade: Commelinids
- Order: Poales
- Family: Bromeliaceae
- Genus: Hohenbergia
- Species: H. catingae

Binomial name
- Hohenbergia catingae Ule

Synonyms
- Hohenbergia catingae var. horrida (Harms) L.B.Sm. & Read

= Hohenbergia catingae =

Species of flowering plant

Hohenbergia catingae is a plant species in the genus Hohenbergia. This species is endemic to Brazil ((Minas Gerais, Bahia, Pernambuco, Paraíba)).
