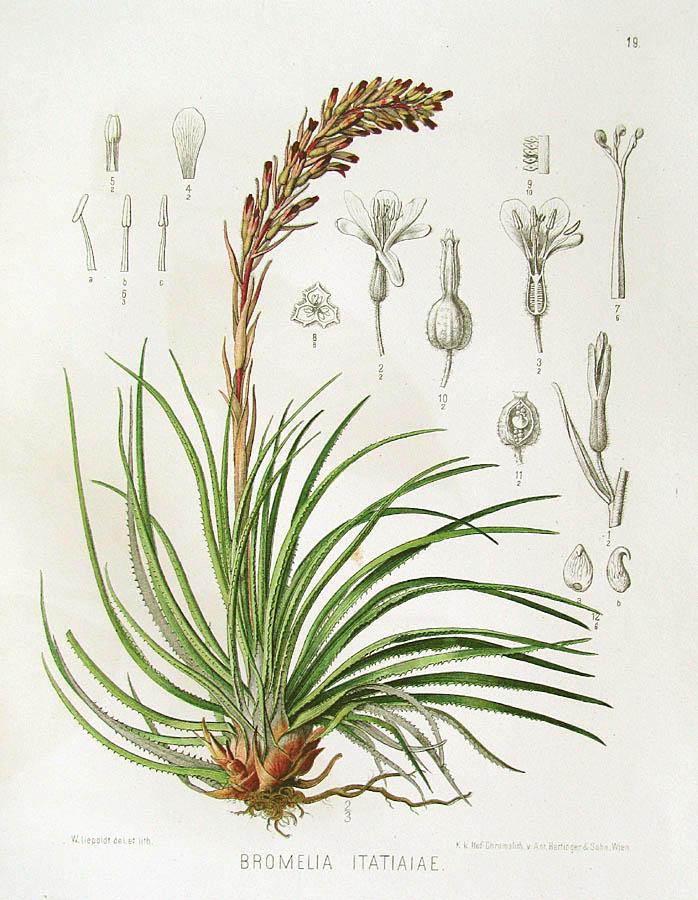
- Fernseea itatiaiae

Scientific classification
- Kingdom: Plantae
- Clade: Tracheophytes
- Clade: Angiosperms
- Clade: Monocots
- Clade: Commelinids
- Order: Poales
- Family: Bromeliaceae
- Subfamily: Bromelioideae
- Genus: Fernseea; Baker

= Fernseea =

Genus of flowering plants

Fernseea is a genus of plants in the family Bromeliaceae, subfamily Bromelioideae, with two known species, both endemic to Brazil. The genus was named in honor of Moravian-Austrian botanist and physician at Vienna, Heinrich Ritter Wawra von Fernsee (1831–1887) by John Gilbert Baker.

== Species ==
- Fernseea bocainensis E. Pereira & Moutinho – Rio de Janeiro and São Paulo
- Fernseea itatiaiae (Wawra) Baker – Agulhas Negras
