= Hohenbergia horrida =

Scientific classification
- Kingdom: Plantae
- Clade: Tracheophytes
- Clade: Angiosperms
- Clade: Monocots
- Clade: Commelinids
- Order: Poales
- Family: Bromeliaceae
- Genus: Hohenbergia
- Species: H. horrida

Binomial name
- Hohenbergia horrida Harms

Synonyms
- Hohenbergia catingae var. horrida (Harms) L.B.Sm. & Read

Species of plant

Hohenbergia horrida is a species of flowering plant in the bromeliad family, Bromeliaceae. It is an epiphyte endemic to northeastern Brazil.
