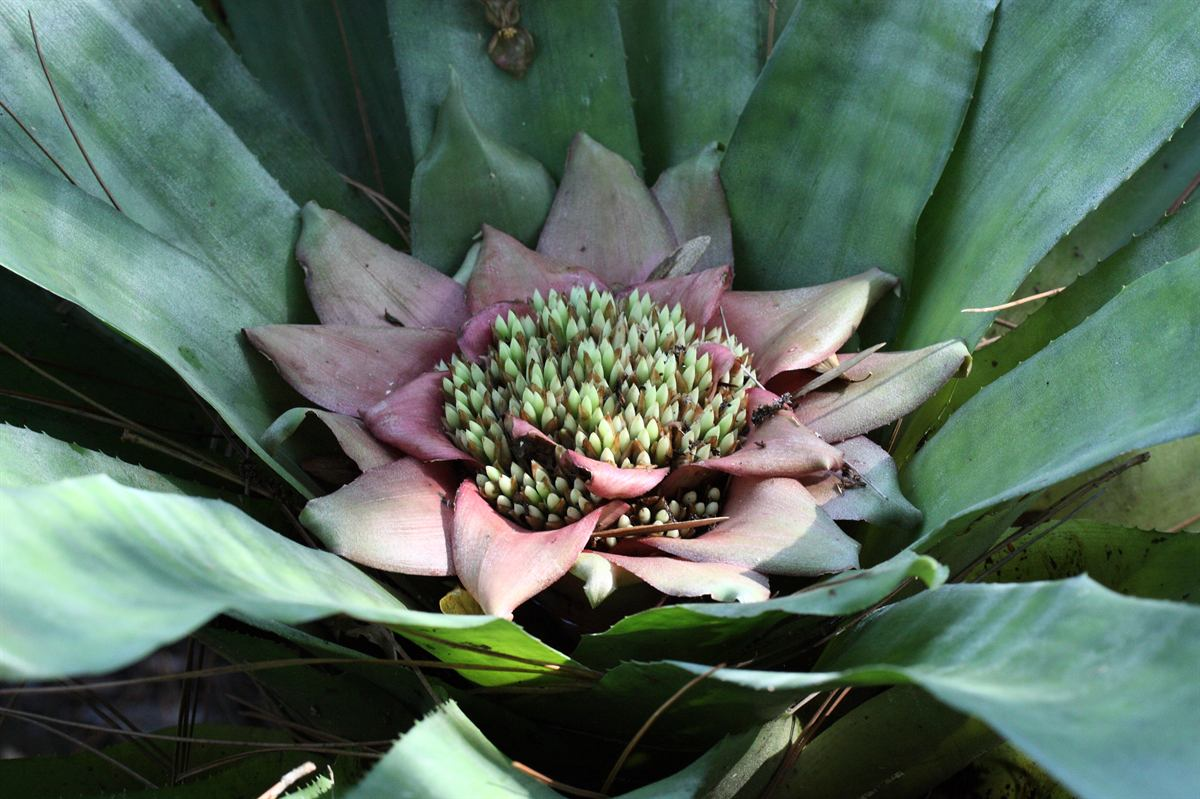

Scientific classification
- Kingdom: Plantae
- Clade: Tracheophytes
- Clade: Angiosperms
- Clade: Monocots
- Clade: Commelinids
- Order: Poales
- Family: Bromeliaceae
- Genus: Edmundoa
- Species: E. lindenii

Binomial name
- Edmundoa lindenii (Regel) Leme

= Edmundoa lindenii =

Species of flowering plant

Edmundoa lindenii is a plant species in the genus Edmundoa. This species is endemic to Brazil.
