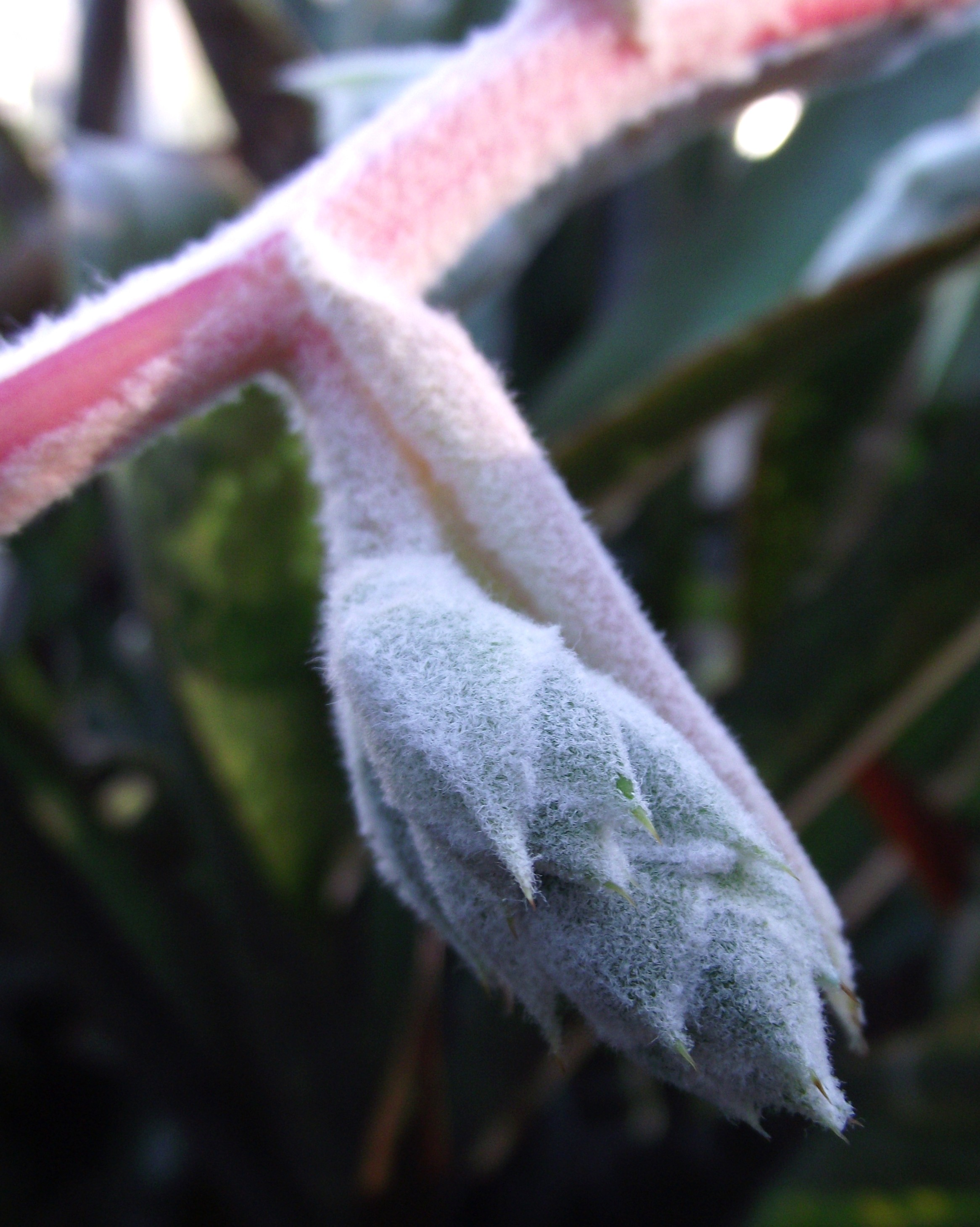

Scientific classification
- Kingdom: Plantae
- Clade: Tracheophytes
- Clade: Angiosperms
- Clade: Monocots
- Clade: Commelinids
- Order: Poales
- Family: Bromeliaceae
- Genus: Hohenbergia
- Species: H. correia-araujoi

Binomial name
- Hohenbergia correia-araujoi E.Pereira & Moutinho

= Hohenbergia correia-araujoi =

Species of flowering plant

Hohenbergia correia-araujoi is a plant species in the genus Hohenbergia. This species is endemic to Brazil.

== Cultivars ==
- × Hohenmea 'Betsy McCrory'
