= Hohenbergia salzmannii =

Scientific classification
- Kingdom: Plantae
- Clade: Tracheophytes
- Clade: Angiosperms
- Clade: Monocots
- Clade: Commelinids
- Order: Poales
- Family: Bromeliaceae
- Genus: Hohenbergia
- Species: H. salzmannii

Binomial name
- Hohenbergia salzmannii (Baker) E.Morren ex Mez

Synonyms
- Aechmea salzmannii Baker; Hohenbergia sellowiana Mez

Species of plant

Hohenbergia salzmannii is a species of flowering plant in the Bromeliaceae family. It is endemic to Brazil.
