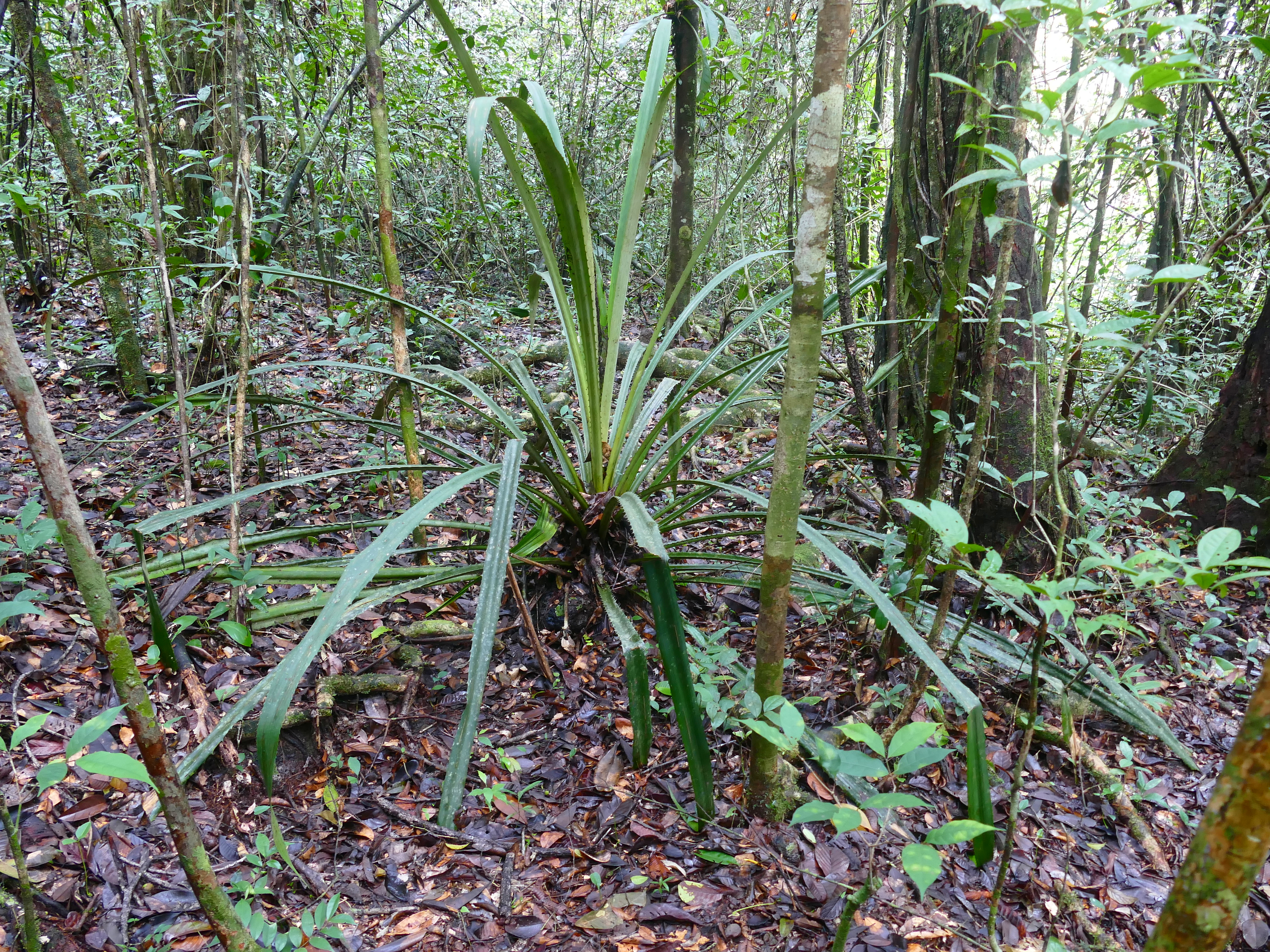
- Disteganthus gracieae

Scientific classification
- Kingdom: Plantae
- Clade: Tracheophytes
- Clade: Angiosperms
- Clade: Monocots
- Clade: Commelinids
- Order: Poales
- Family: Bromeliaceae
- Subfamily: Bromelioideae
- Genus: Disteganthus; Lem.

= Disteganthus =

Genus of flowering plants

Disteganthus is a genus of plants in the family Bromeliaceae, subfamily Bromelioideae. The genus name is from the Greek “dis” (two), “steg” (covering), and “anthos” (flower). They are considered a primitive genus among bromeliads and are only found in terrestrial environments. Distenganthus has three known species, native to northeastern South America.

== Species ==
- Disteganthus basilateralis Lemaire - French Guiana
- Disteganthus gracieae Aguirre-Santoro & Michelang. - French Guiana, Suriname
- Disteganthus lateralis (L.B. Smith) Gouda - French Guiana, Suriname
- Disteganthus morii Aguirre-Santoro & Michelang. - Suriname
