= Hohenbergia itamarajuensis =

Scientific classification
- Kingdom: Plantae
- Clade: Tracheophytes
- Clade: Angiosperms
- Clade: Monocots
- Clade: Commelinids
- Order: Poales
- Family: Bromeliaceae
- Genus: Hohenbergia
- Species: H. itamarajuensis

Binomial name
- Hohenbergia itamarajuensis Leme & Baracho

Species of flowering plant

Hohenbergia itamarajuensis is a plant species in the genus Hohenbergia. This species is endemic to Brazil. It was described in 1999 by Elton Martinez Carvalho Leme and George Sidney Baracho. The species occurs near Itamaraju in the state of Bahia in the north-east of the country. Plant material was originally collected in 1986, and subsequently plants have been cultivated and produced flowers.
