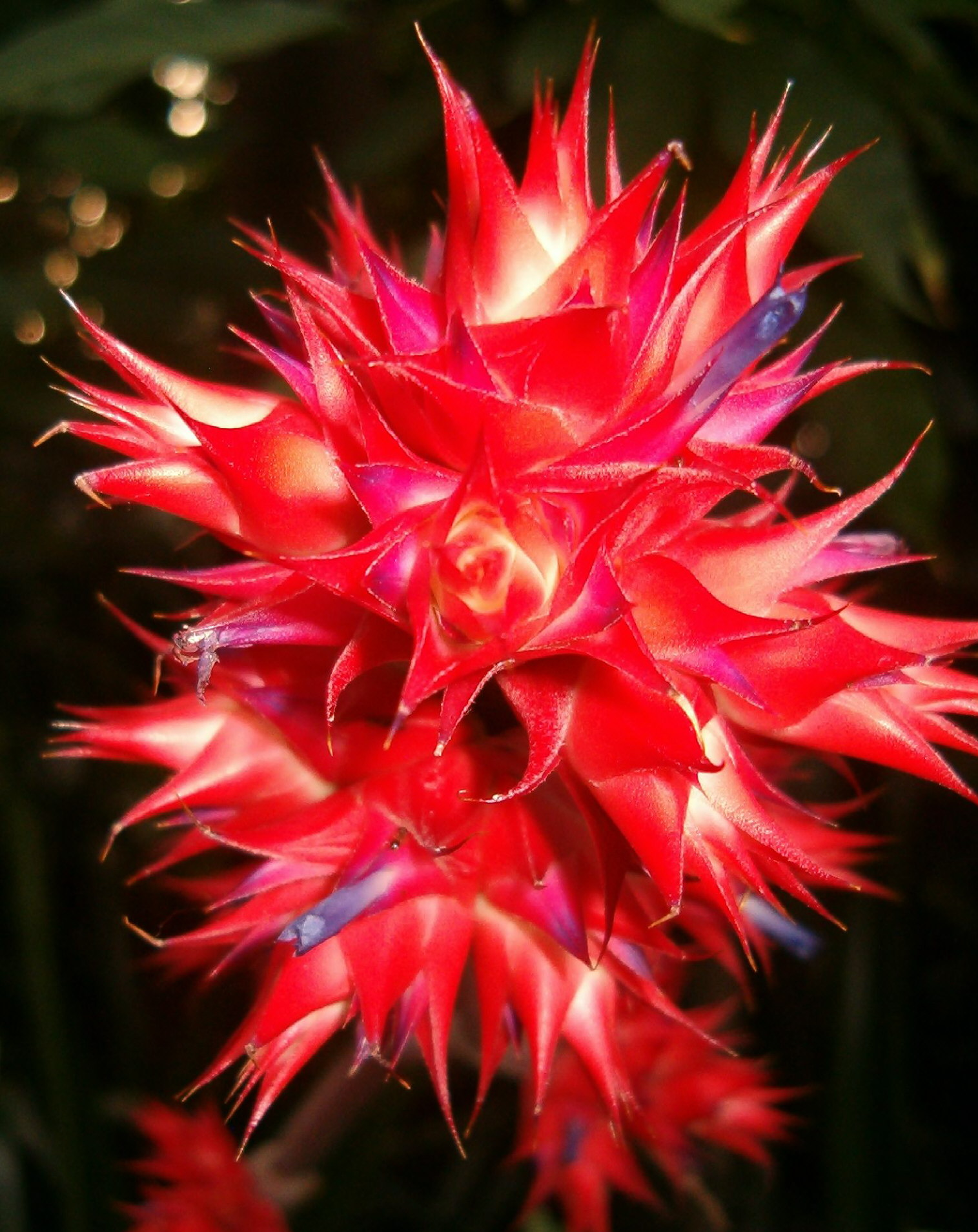
- Hohenbergia stellata inflorescence

Scientific classification
- Kingdom: Plantae
- Clade: Embryophytes
- Clade: Tracheophytes
- Clade: Angiosperms
- Clade: Monocots
- Clade: Commelinids
- Order: Poales
- Family: Bromeliaceae
- Subfamily: Bromelioideae
- Genus: Hohenbergia; Schult. & Schult.f.

Species
- See text

= Hohenbergia =

Genus of flowering plants

Hohenbergia is a genus of plants in the family Bromeliaceae, subfamily Bromelioideae. It is native to the West Indies, the Yucatán Peninsula, and northern South America (Colombia, Venezuela, Brazil).

The genus name is named after Duke Paul Wilhelm of Württemberg, a German botanist and patron of botany who travelled to the Americas under the alias of Baron of Hohenberg. This genus has two recognized subgenera: the type subgenus and Wittmackiopsis Mez. Recent DNA studies have shown the two subgenera are not monophyletic, and the species of subg. Wittmackiopsis have been transferred to the resurrected genus Wittmackia.

== Species ==
53 species are accepted.

- Hohenbergia aechmeoides Leme - Paraíba
- Hohenbergia amargosensis E.H.Souza & Leme – Bahia
- Hohenbergia andina Betancur - Colombia (Antioquia)
- Hohenbergia arcuata Leme & M.Machado - Bahia
- Hohenbergia augusta (Vellozo) E. Morren - southeastern Brazil from Espírito Santo to Santa Catarina
- Hohenbergia barbarespina Leme & Fraga - Bahia
- Hohenbergia belemii L.B. Smith & R.W. Read - Bahia
- Hohenbergia blanchetii (Baker) E. Morren ex Mez - eastern Brazil from Pernambuco to Espírito Santo
- Hohenbergia brachycephala L.B. Smith - Bahia
- Hohenbergia burle-marxii Leme & W. Till - Bahia
- Hohenbergia capitata Schult. & Schult.f. - eastern Brazil from Bahia to Espírito Santo
- Hohenbergia castellanosii L.B. Smith & R.W. Read - Bahia
- Hohenbergia catingae Ule eastern Brazil (Minas Gerais, Bahia, Pernambuco, and Paraíba)
- Hohenbergia conquistensis Leme - Bahia
- Hohenbergia correia-araujoi E. Pereira & Moutinho - Bahia
- Hohenbergia densa B.P.Cavalcante – Rio Grande do Norte
- Hohenbergia edmundoi L.B. Smith & R.W. Read - Bahia
- Hohenbergia eriantha (Brongniart ex Baker) Mez - Pernambuco
- Hohenbergia estevesii E. Pereira & Moutinho - Bahia
- Hohenbergia flava Leme & Paula - Bahia
- Hohenbergia halutheriana Leme – Bahia
- Hohenbergia hatschbachii Leme - Bahia
- Hohenbergia horrida Harms – northeastern Brazil
- Hohenbergia humilis L.B. Smith & R.W. Read - Bahia
- Hohenbergia igatuensis Leme - Bahia
- Hohenbergia isepponae Gonç.-Oliv. & Wand. – Pernambuco
- Hohenbergia itamarajuensis Leme & Baracho - Bahia
- Hohenbergia ituberaensis B.P.Cavalcante, E.H.Souza & Versieux – Bahia
- Hohenbergia lanata E. Pereira & Moutinho - Bahia
- Hohenbergia lativaginata J.R.Maciel & Louzada – Bahia
- Hohenbergia lemei H. Luther & K. Norton - Bahia
- Hohenbergia leopoldo-horstii E. Gross, Rauh & Leme - Bahia
- Hohenbergia littoralis L.B. Smith - Bahia
- Hohenbergia loredanoana Leme & L.Kollmann - Minas Gerais
- Hohenbergia magnispina Leme - Bahia
- Hohenbergia membranostrobilus Mez - Espírito Santo, Rio de Janeiro
- Hohenbergia minor L.B. Smith - Bahia
- Hohenbergia mutabilis Leme & L.Kollmann - Espírito Santo
- Hohenbergia nidularioides B.P.Cavalcante, E.H.Souza, A.P.Martinelli & Versieux – Bahia
- Hohenbergia oxoniensis W. Weber - eastern Brazil
- Hohenbergia pabstii L.B. Smith & R.W. Read - Bahia, Minas Gerais
- Hohenbergia pennae E. Pereira - Bahia
- Hohenbergia reconcavensis Leme & Fraga - Bahia
- Hohenbergia ridleyi (Baker) Mez - Paraíba, Pernambuco
- Hohenbergia rosea L.B. Smith & R.W. Read - Bahia
- Hohenbergia salzmannii (Baker) E. Morren ex Mez - Bahia
- Hohenbergia sandrae Leme - Bahia
- Hohenbergia stellata Schult. & Schult.f. - Trinidad-Tobago, Martinique?, Netherlands Antilles, Venezuela, Alagoas, Bahia, Piauí
- Hohenbergia undulatifolia Leme & H. Luther - Bahia
- Hohenbergia utriculosa Ule - Bahia
- Hohenbergia vestita L.B. Smith - Bahia
- Hohenbergia viridirubra Leme – Bahia
- Hohenbergia ymboreorum E.H.Souza & B.P.Cavalcante – Bahia

== Cultivars ==
- Hohenbergia 'Maria Valentina'
