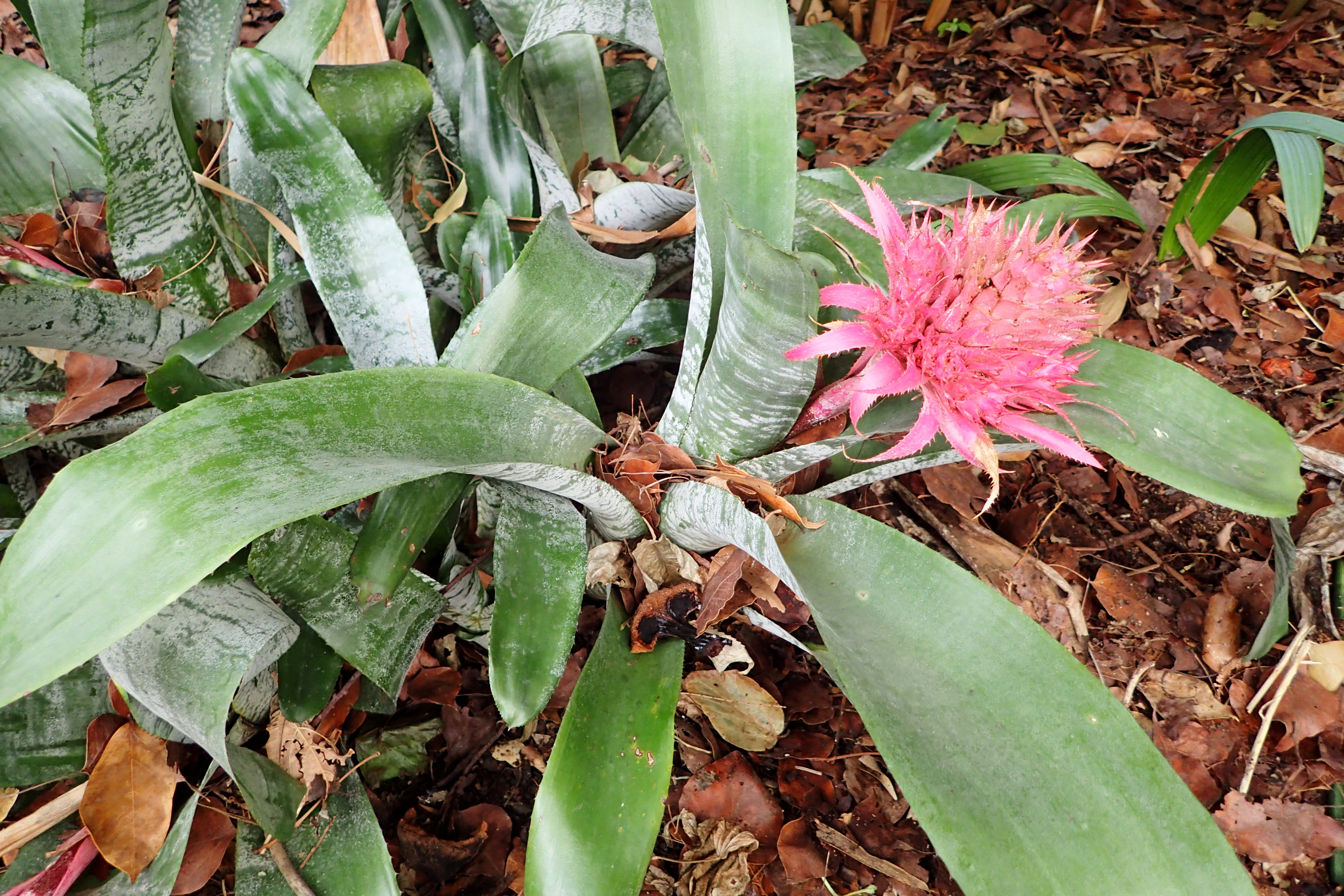
- Aechmea fasciata

Scientific classification
- Kingdom: Plantae
- Clade: Embryophytes
- Clade: Tracheophytes
- Clade: Spermatophytes
- Clade: Angiosperms
- Clade: Monocots
- Clade: Commelinids
- Order: Poales
- Family: Bromeliaceae
- Subfamily: Bromelioideae

= Bromelioideae =

Subfamily of bromeliad flowering plants

Bromelioideae is a subfamily of the bromeliads (Bromeliaceae). This subfamily is the most diverse in the family, represented by the greatest number of genera with about 40. Most of the plants in this group are epiphytes, though some have evolved in, or will adapt to, terrestrial conditions. This subfamily features the most plant types which are commonly cultivated by people, including the pineapple.

== Description ==
The foliage in most bromelioides grows to form a rosette where water is caught and stored. Their leaves are usually spined and they produce berry-like fruits in their blooms. These plants contain an inferior ovary.

== Genera ==
As of November 2022, the Encyclopaedia of Bromeliads listed 39 genera, plus one hybrid genus (×Hohenmea B.R.Silva & L.F.Sousa) and one genus with no species listed, that Plants of the World Online treated as an artificial hybrid genus (×Cryptbergia R.G.Wilson & C.L.Wilson). A further genus, Hylaeaicum, was separated from Neoregelia in 2021.

Image	Genus	Number of living species
	Acanthostachys	2 species
	Aechmea	255 species
	Ananas	2 species
	Androlepis	2 species
	Araeococcus	9 species
	Billbergia	64 species
	Bromelia	56 species
	Canistropsis	11 species
	Canistrum	13 species
	Cryptanthus	63 species
	Deinacanthon	1 species
	Disteganthus	2 species
	Edmundoa	3 species
	Eduandrea	1 species
	Fascicularia	1 species
	Fernseea	2 species
	Forzzaea	7 species
	Greigia	33 species
	Hylaeaicum	12 species
	Hohenbergia	56 species
	Hohenbergiopsis	1 species
	Hoplocryptanthus (Mez) Leme, S.Heller & Zizka	9 species
	Karawata J.R.Maciel & G.Sousa	7 species
	Lapanthus Louzada & Versieux	2 species
	Lymania	9 species
	Neoglaziovia	3 species
	Neoregelia	112 species
	Nidularium	45 species
	Ochagavia	4 species
	Orthophytum	53 species
	Portea	9 species
	Pseudaechmea	1 species
	Pseudaraeococcus	6 species
	Quesnelia	20 species
	Rokautskyia	14 species
	Ronnbergia	14 species
	Sincoraea Ule	11 species
	Ursulaea	2 species
	Wittrockia	6 species
	Wittmackia Meze	44 species
