= Hohenbergia ridleyi =

Scientific classification
- Kingdom: Plantae
- Clade: Tracheophytes
- Clade: Angiosperms
- Clade: Monocots
- Clade: Commelinids
- Order: Poales
- Family: Bromeliaceae
- Genus: Hohenbergia
- Species: H. ridleyi

Binomial name
- Hohenbergia ridleyi (Baker) Mez

Synonyms
- Hohenbergia ramageana (Baker) Mez

Species of plant

Hohenbergia ridleyi is a species of flowering plant in the Bromeliaceae family. It is endemic to Brazil (Paraíba, Pernambuco).
