= Heinrich Wawra von Fernsee =

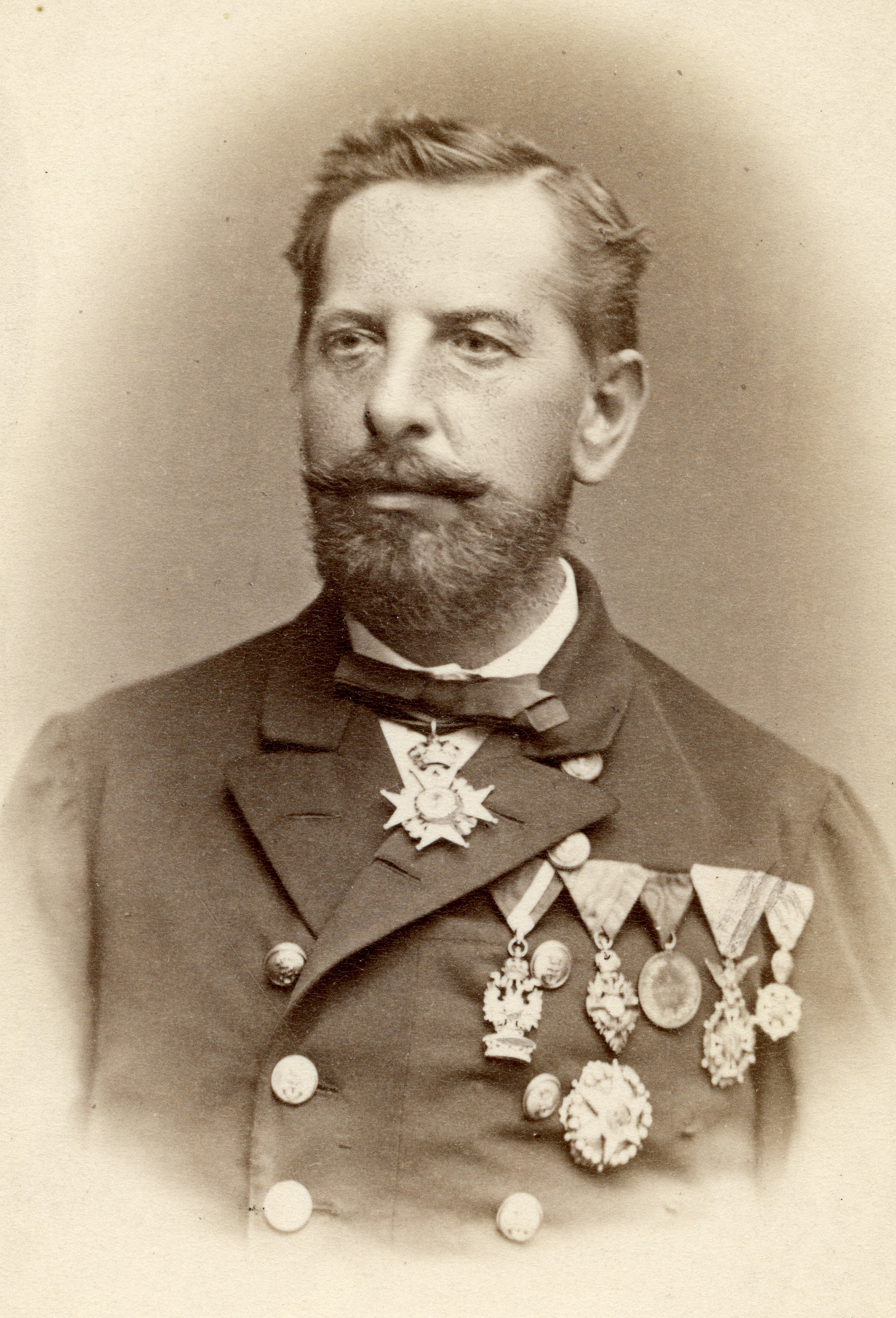
Heinrich Wawra Ritter von Fernsee

Heinrich Wawra Ritter von Fernsee (born Jindřich Blažej Vávra; 2 February 1831 – 24 May 1887) was a Czech-Austrian ship surgeon, botanist and explorer.

== Biography ==
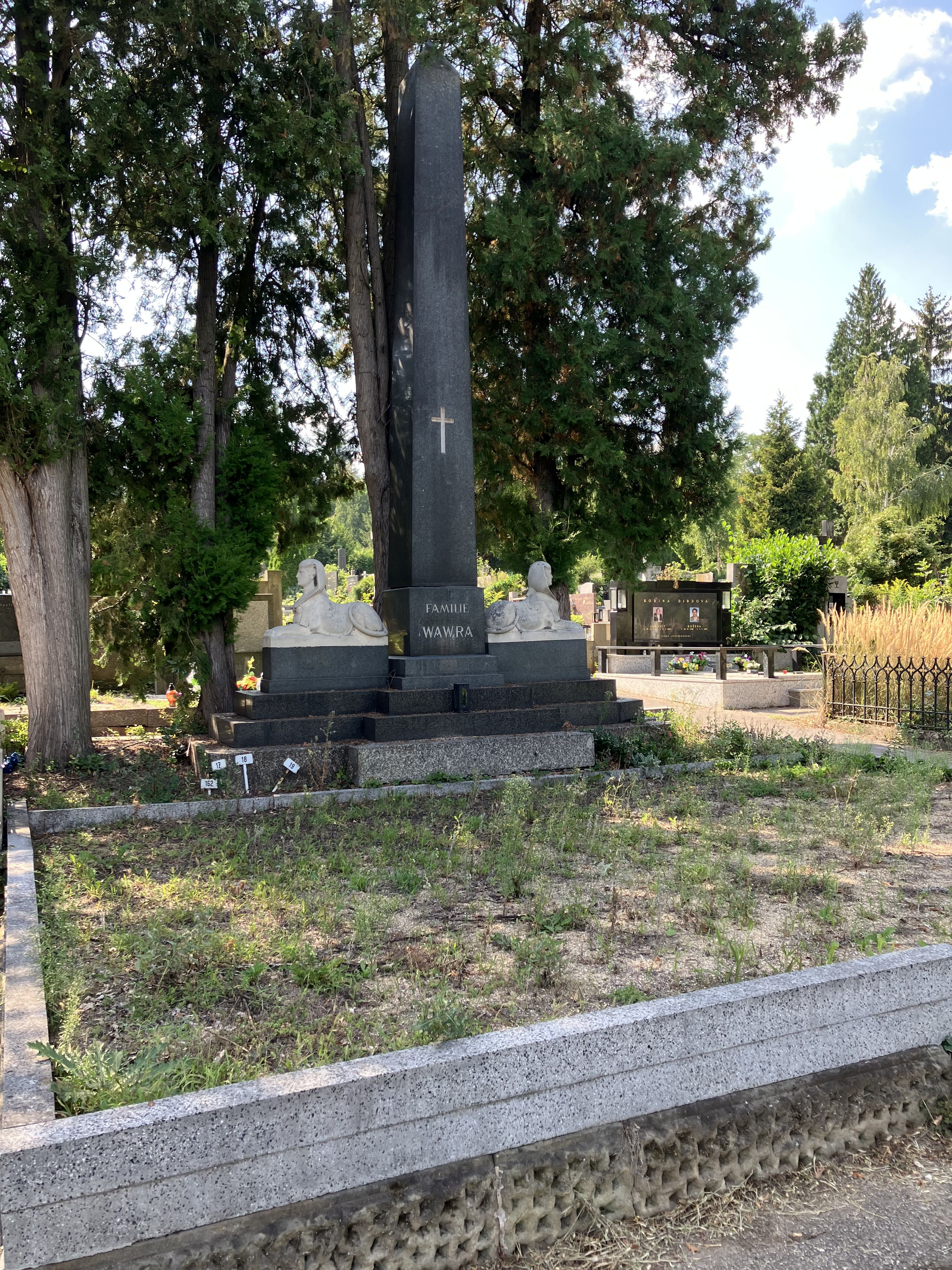
Wawra family tomb at Brno Central Cemetery

Heinrich Wawra von Fernsee was born on 2 February 1831 in Brno, Moravia. The youngest of five sons of a miller, he studied medicine and botany at the University of Vienna from 1849 to 1855. Upon graduating he joined the Austro-Hungarian Imperial Navy on 6 December 1855. The commander of the fleet at this time was the Archduke Ferdinand Maximilian. Wawra von Fernsee retired from the navy in 1878 to work on his extensive collections. He died on 24 May 1887 in Baden, at the age of 56.

Wawra was buried at the Brno Central Cemetery into the Wawra family tomb, which is today protected as a cultural monument.

The plant genus Fernseea was named after him.

== Expeditions ==
- 1856: Ship surgeon on the schooner Saida to the Western Mediterranean.
- 1857–1858: Ship surgeon on the corvette Carolin, and escort to the frigate SMS Novara, sailing to Gibraltar, Madeira, Teneriffe, Brazil, Cape of Good Hope, Benguela, Luanda, Ascension Island, Cape Verde, Java, Singapore, Thailand, Vietnam, China, Japan, Hawaii, South America, as escort to the frigate Novarra.
- 1859–1860: Ship surgeon and botanist (with royal gardener Franz Maly) on the destroyer Elisabeth accompanying Maximilian to Brazil.
- 1860–1861: Ship surgeon on the frigate Adria at the disposal of Empress Elisabeth (Elisabeth of Bavaria) during her stay on Corfu.
- 1864–1865: Ship surgeon on the frigate SMS Novara, the transport ship of Emperor Maximilian of Mexico.
- 1868–1871: Ship surgeon on the frigate Donau in company of the corvette Friedrich on a diplomatic and commercial mission to East Asia, visiting Liverpool, New York City, San Francisco, Honolulu, New Zealand, Australia, Ceylon, Saigon, China, Japan, Hong Kong, Macau, Singapore, Java (Buitenzorg now Bogor Botanic Gardens).
- 1872–1873: Trip around the world with the Princes Phillip and August von Saxe-Coburg-Gotha (on leave from the navy).
- 1875–1877: Ship surgeon on the frigate Radetzky on several cruises through the Levant.
- 1879: Second trip around the world with the princes (after retirement from the navy).

== Collections ==
Herb. Vienna [W]. Duplicates at Herb. Berlin [B], Herb. Decand. [G]); Herb. Bot. Gard. St Petersburg [LE]). Wood samples at Franzens Museum in Brno.

== Major publications ==
- Botanische Ergebnisse der Reise Seiner Majestät des Kaisers von Mexico Maximilian I. nach Brasilien (1859-60). Auf allerhöchst dessen Anordnung beschrieben und hrsg. von Heinrich Wawra. Wien, C. Gerold's Sohn, 1866.
- Itinera principum S. Coburgi: Die botanische Ausbeute von den Reisen ihrer Hoheiten der Prinzen von Sachsen-Coburg-Gotha, I. Reise der Prinzen Philipp und August um die Welt (1872-1873), II. Reise der Prinzen August und Ferdinand nach Brasilien" (1879) beschrieben von Heinrich Ritter Wawra v. Fernsee.
- Neue Pflanzenarten gesammelt auf der transatlantischen Expedition Sr. k. Hoheit des durchlauchtigsten Herrn Erzherzog Ferdinand Maximilian. von H. Wawra und Franz Maly, beschrieben von Dr. Heinrich Wawra

== Notes ==
- Note regarding personal names: Ritter is a title, best translated as Knight, in the British sense of an hereditary knighthood, not a first or middle name.
