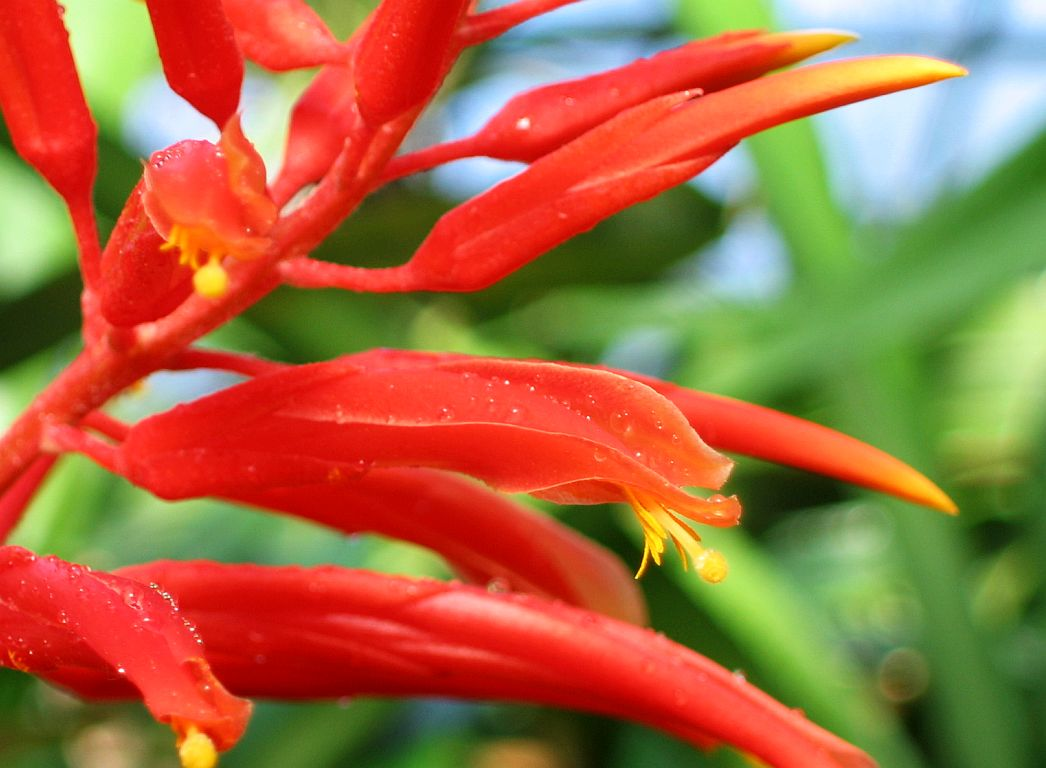
- Pitcairnia grafii inflorescence

Scientific classification
- Kingdom: Plantae
- Clade: Tracheophytes
- Clade: Angiosperms
- Clade: Monocots
- Clade: Commelinids
- Order: Poales
- Family: Bromeliaceae
- Subfamily: Pitcairnioideae

Genera
- See text.

= Pitcairnioideae =

Species of flowering plant

Pitcairnioideae is a subfamily of the bromeliad family, Bromeliaceae. Traditionally, it was a large subfamily, comprising all those species with winged or more rarely naked seeds. Molecular phylogenetic studies showed that traditional Pitcairnioideae was not monophyletic, and the subfamily was more narrowly circumscribed. As of November 2022, the Encyclopaedia of Bromeliads placed five genera in the subfamily. Members of the subfamily are found from the Andes to the coast of Brazil, with one genus (Fosterella) found northwards to Mexico.

== Description ==
Species in the subfamily Pitcairnioideae have fruits in the form of capsules with winged seeds. The petals are not joined together when the flowers open, and are usually large and conspicuous.

== Taxonomy ==
Traditionally, the family Bromeliaceae was divided into three subfamilies based on the structure of the seeds and fruit, with Pitcairnioideae comprising all those with winged or rarely naked seeds. The other subfamilies were Bromelioideae and Tillandsioideae. A molecular phylogenetic study in 2007 showed that traditional Pitcairnioideae was not monophyletic, with Tillandsioideae embedded within it. The original broadly defined subfamily was divided it into six, including a more narrowly circumscribed Pitcairnioideae. The division was confirmed in a larger 2011 study, and is accepted by the Encyclopaedia of Bromeliads, which includes five genera in Pitcairnioideae.

=== Genera ===
As of November 2022, the Encyclopaedia of Bromeliads placed five genera in the subfamily:

Image	Genus	Number of living species
	Deuterocohnia Mez	18
	Dyckia Schult.f.	130
	Encholirium Schult.f.	22
	Fosterella L.B.Sm.	30
	Pitcairnia L'Hér. (including Pepinia Brongn. ex André)	over 400

=== Former genera ===
Other genera that were placed in Pitcairnioideae when it was broadly defined are now put into different subfamilies.

- Brewcaria L.B.Sm., Steyerm. & H.Rob. (may be included in Navia) → Navioideae
- Brocchinia Schult.f. ex Schult. & Schult.f. → Brocchinioideae (the only genus)
- Connellia N.E.Br. → Lindmanioideae
- Cottendorfia Schult.f. → Navioideae
- Hechtia Klotzsch → Hechtioideae (only genus)
- Lindmania Mez → Lindmanioideae
- Navia Schult. & Schult.f. → Navioideae
- Puya Molina → Puyoideae (the only genus)
- Sequencia (L.B.Sm.) Givnish → Navioideae
- Steyerbromelia L.B.Sm. → Navioideae

== Distribution ==
The subfamily is thought to have arisen in the northern Andes, spreading southwards and then eastwards into the Brazilian Shield and the easternmost part of Brazil (the "horn of Brazil"). Fosterella is also found in Mexico and Central America.
