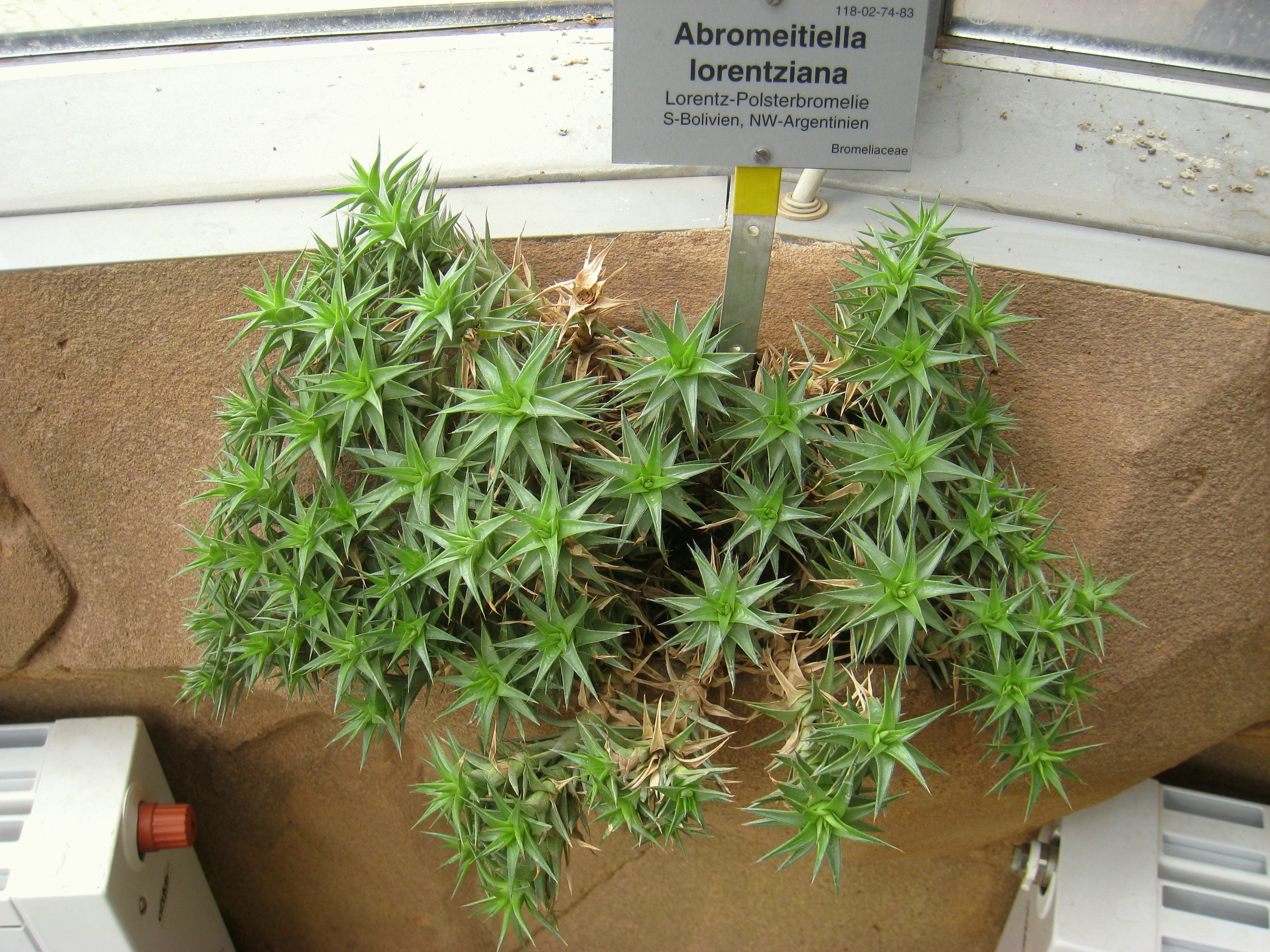
- Deuterocohnia lorentziana (Abromeitiella lorentziana)

Scientific classification
- Kingdom: Plantae
- Clade: Tracheophytes
- Clade: Angiosperms
- Clade: Monocots
- Clade: Commelinids
- Order: Poales
- Family: Bromeliaceae
- Genus: Deuterocohnia
- Species: D. lorentziana

Binomial name
- Deuterocohnia lorentziana (Mez) M.A. Spencer & L.B. Smith

= Deuterocohnia lorentziana =

Species of flowering plant

Deuterocohnia lorentziana is a plant species in the genus Deuterocohnia. This species is native to Bolivia.
