= D. digitata =

D. digitata may refer to:

- Deuterocohnia digitata, a plant species native to Bolivia
- Drupa digitata, a synonym for Drupa grossularia, the finger drupe, a sea snail species distributed in the Eastern Indian Ocean along Madagascar and in Eastern Polynesia
