= Deuterocohnia bracteosa =

Scientific classification
- Kingdom: Plantae
- Clade: Embryophytes
- Clade: Tracheophytes
- Clade: Spermatophytes
- Clade: Angiosperms
- Clade: Monocots
- Clade: Commelinids
- Order: Poales
- Family: Bromeliaceae
- Genus: Deuterocohnia
- Species: D. bracteosa

Binomial name
- Deuterocohnia bracteosa W. Till & L. Hromadnik

Species of flowering plant

Deuterocohnia bracteosa is a plant species in the genus Deuterocohnia. This species is endemic to Bolivia.
