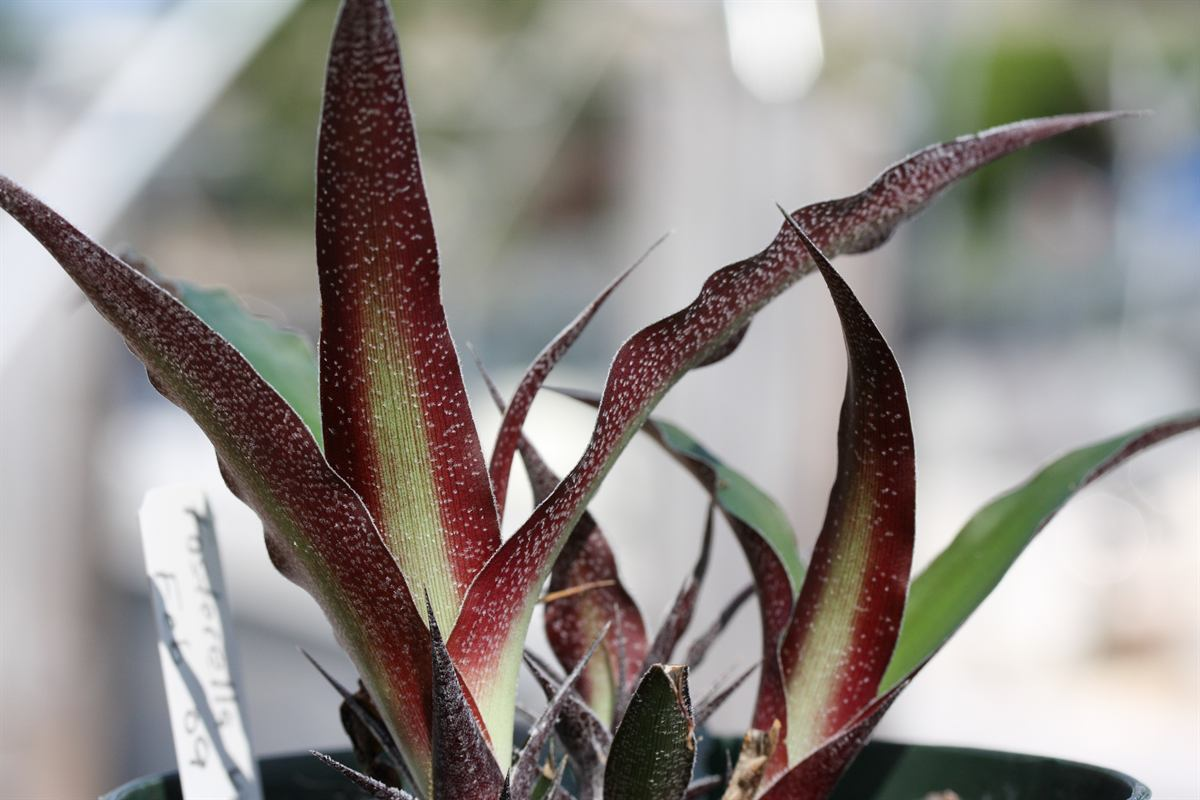

Scientific classification
- Kingdom: Plantae
- Clade: Tracheophytes
- Clade: Angiosperms
- Clade: Monocots
- Clade: Commelinids
- Order: Poales
- Family: Bromeliaceae
- Genus: Fosterella
- Species: F. villosula

Binomial name
- Fosterella villosula (Harms) L.B. Smith

= Fosterella villosula =

Species of flowering plant

Fosterella villosula is a plant species belonging to the genus Fosterella, and it is endemic to Bolivia.
