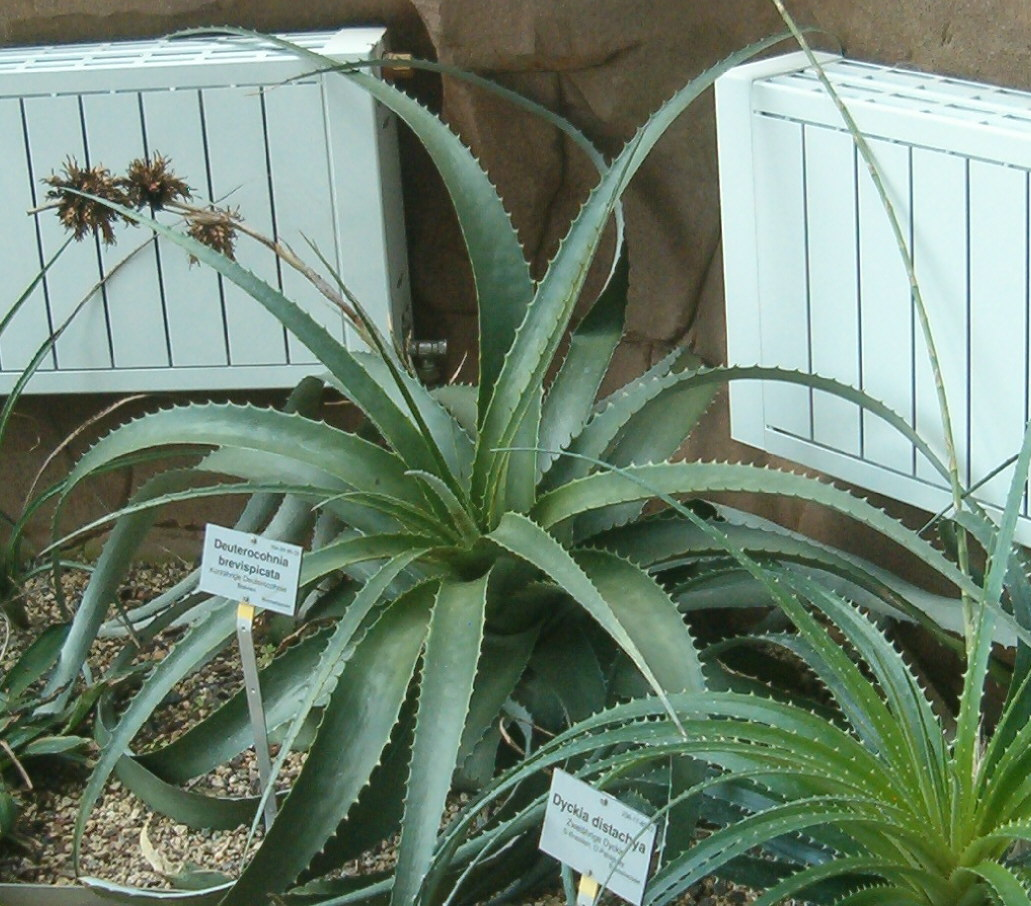

Scientific classification
- Kingdom: Plantae
- Clade: Tracheophytes
- Clade: Angiosperms
- Clade: Monocots
- Clade: Commelinids
- Order: Poales
- Family: Bromeliaceae
- Genus: Deuterocohnia
- Species: D. brevispicata

Binomial name
- Deuterocohnia brevispicata Rauh & L. Hromadnik

= Deuterocohnia brevispicata =

Species of flowering plant

Deuterocohnia brevispicata is a plant species in the genus Deuterocohnia. This species is endemic to Bolivia.
