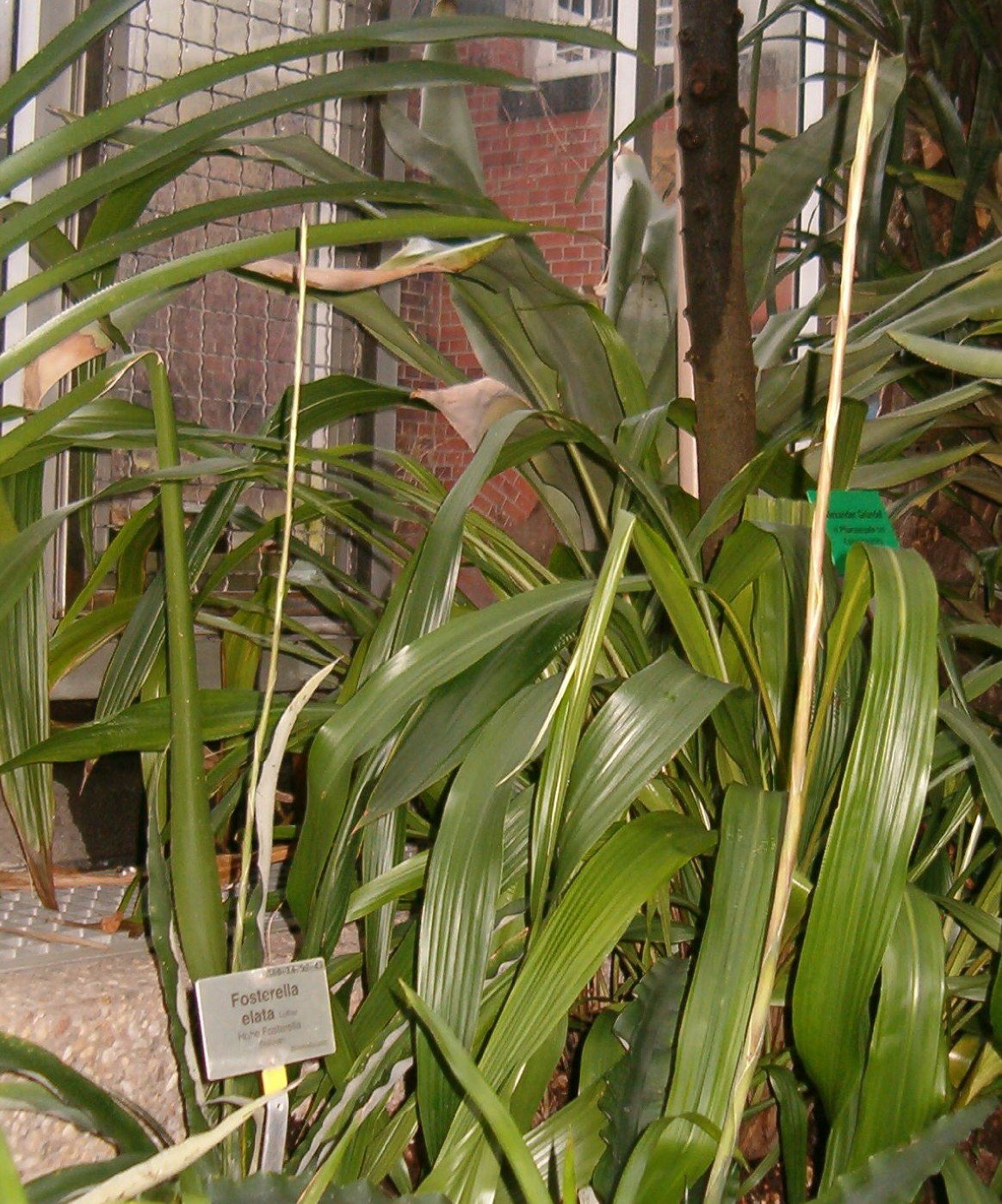

Scientific classification
- Kingdom: Plantae
- Clade: Embryophytes
- Clade: Tracheophytes
- Clade: Spermatophytes
- Clade: Angiosperms
- Clade: Monocots
- Clade: Commelinids
- Order: Poales
- Family: Bromeliaceae
- Genus: Fosterella
- Species: F. rusbyi

Binomial name
- Fosterella rusbyi (Mez) L.B.Sm.

Synonyms
- Homotypic Synonyms: Lindmania rusbyi Mez; Heterotypic Synonyms: Fosterella elata H.Luther

= Fosterella rusbyi =

Species of plant

Fosterella rusbyi is a specie of flowering plant in the family Bromeliaceae. This species is native to Bolivia and Peru.
