= Brewcaria brocchinioides =

Scientific classification
- Kingdom: Plantae
- Clade: Tracheophytes
- Clade: Angiosperms
- Clade: Monocots
- Clade: Commelinids
- Order: Poales
- Family: Bromeliaceae
- Genus: Brewcaria
- Species: B. brocchinioides

Binomial name
- Brewcaria brocchinioides (L.B.Sm.) B.Holst

Species of plant

Brewcaria brocchinioides is a species of plants in the genus Brewcaria. This species is endemic to Venezuela.
