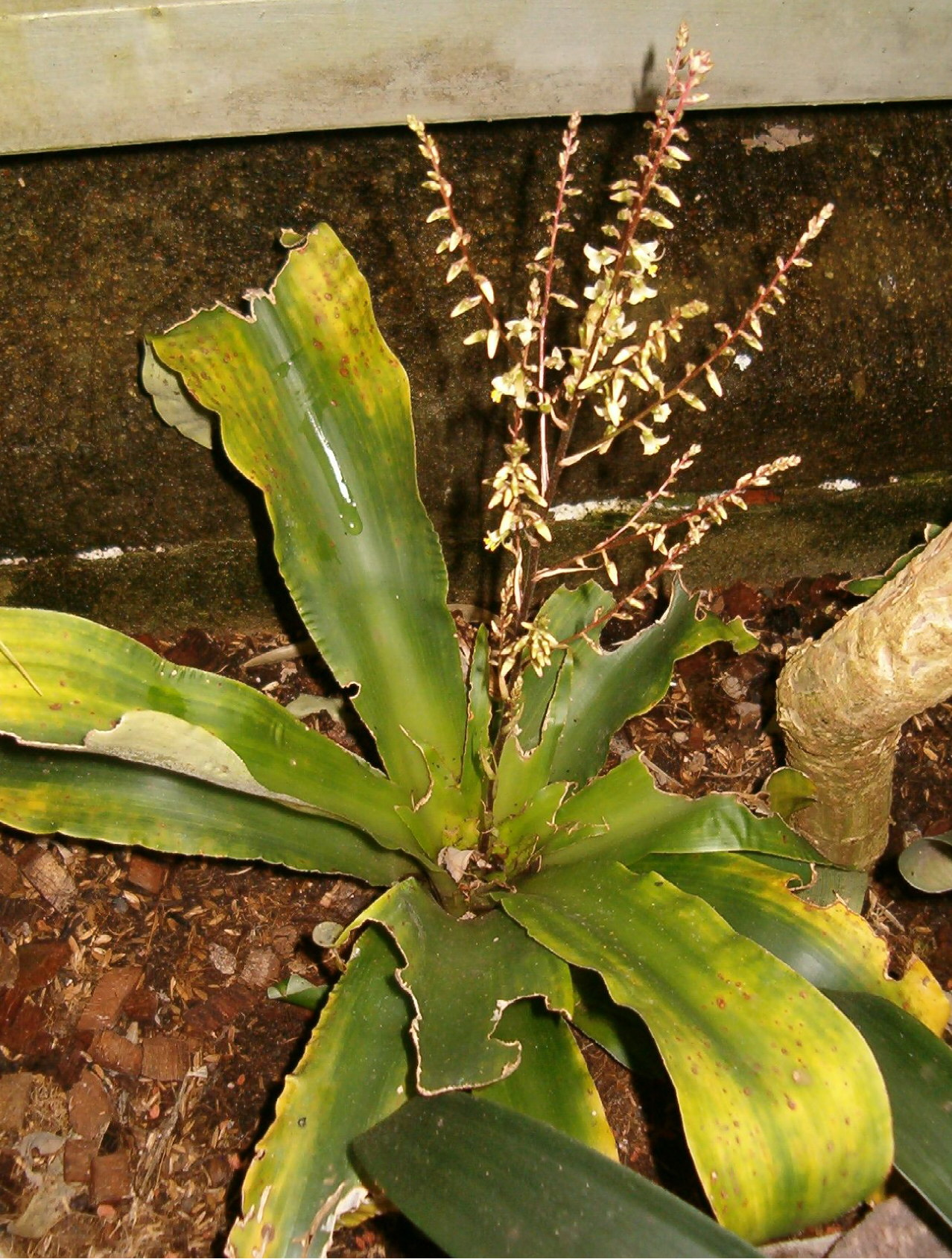

Scientific classification
- Kingdom: Plantae
- Clade: Tracheophytes
- Clade: Angiosperms
- Clade: Monocots
- Clade: Commelinids
- Order: Poales
- Family: Bromeliaceae
- Genus: Fosterella
- Species: F. micrantha

Binomial name
- Fosterella micrantha (Lindley) L.B. Smith

Synonyms
- Pitcairnia micrantha Lindl.; Lindmania micrantha (Lindl.) L.B.Sm.; Cottendorfia neogranatensis Baker; Lindmania neogranatensis (Baker) Mez; Lindmania flaccida Standl.

= Fosterella micrantha =

Species of plant

Fosterella micrantha is a plant species in the genus Fosterella. This species is native to Mexico (Nuevo León, Veracruz, Chiapas, Oaxaca, Guerrero), Guatemala, and El Salvador.
