= Brewcaria hechtioides =

Scientific classification
- Kingdom: Plantae
- Clade: Tracheophytes
- Clade: Angiosperms
- Clade: Monocots
- Clade: Commelinids
- Order: Poales
- Family: Bromeliaceae
- Genus: Brewcaria
- Species: B. hechtioides

Binomial name
- Brewcaria hechtioides (L.B.Sm.) B.Holst

Species of flowering plant

Brewcaria hechtioides is a plant species in the genus Brewcaria. This species is endemic to Venezuela.
