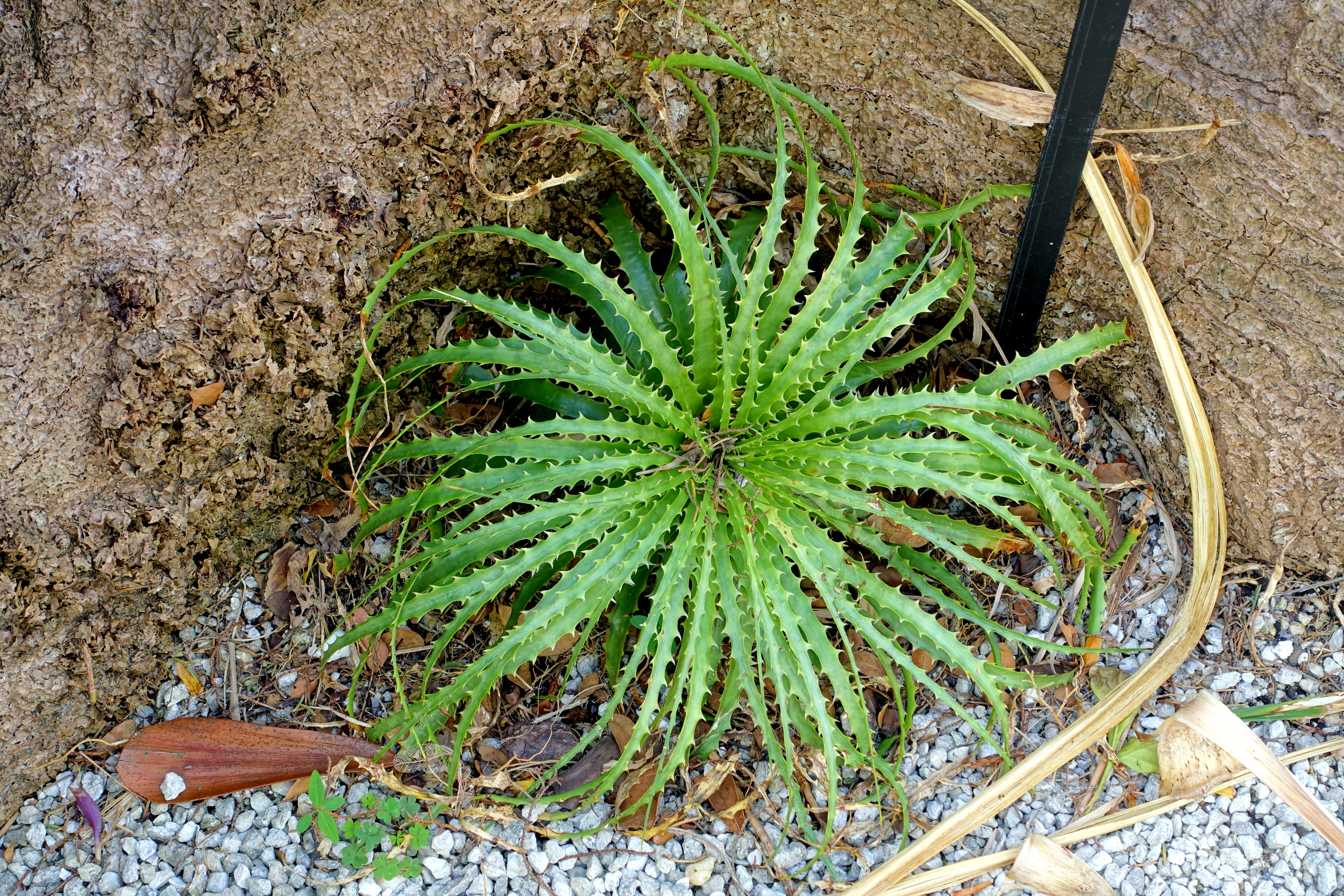

Scientific classification
- Kingdom: Plantae
- Clade: Tracheophytes
- Clade: Angiosperms
- Clade: Monocots
- Clade: Commelinids
- Order: Poales
- Family: Bromeliaceae
- Genus: Encholirium
- Species: E. horridum

Binomial name
- Encholirium horridum L.B.Sm.

= Encholirium horridum =

Species of flowering plant

Encholirium horridum is a xerophytic bromeliad native to the states of Minas Gerais and Espírito Santo in eastern Brazil.
