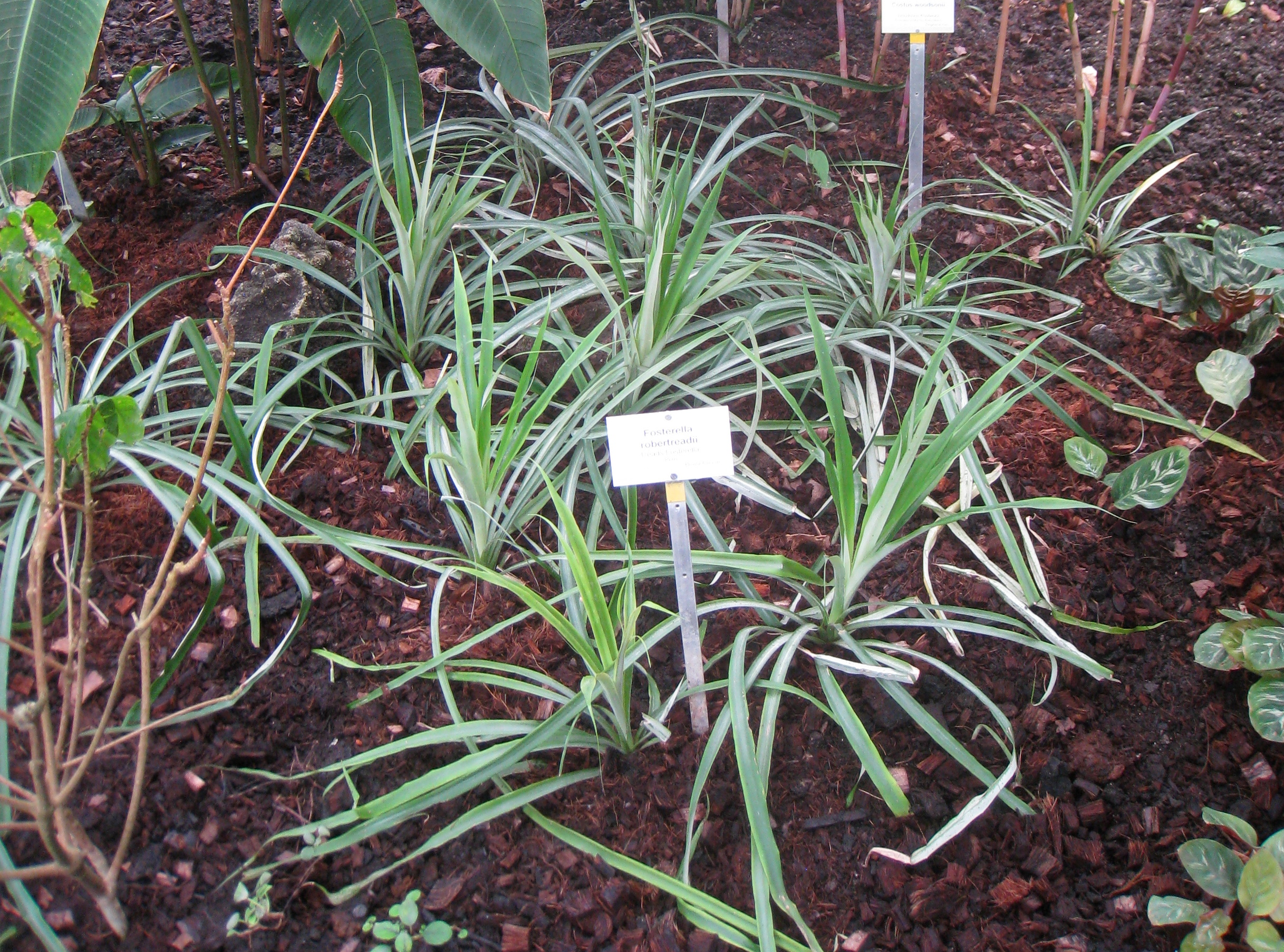
- At Berlin Botanical Garden

Scientific classification
- Kingdom: Plantae
- Clade: Tracheophytes
- Clade: Angiosperms
- Clade: Monocots
- Clade: Commelinids
- Order: Poales
- Family: Bromeliaceae
- Genus: Fosterella
- Species: F. robertreadii

Binomial name
- Fosterella robertreadii Ibisch, R.Vásquez & J.Peters

= Fosterella robertreadii =

Species of plant

Fosterella robertreadii is a plant species of the genus Fosterella. It is endemic to Peru.
