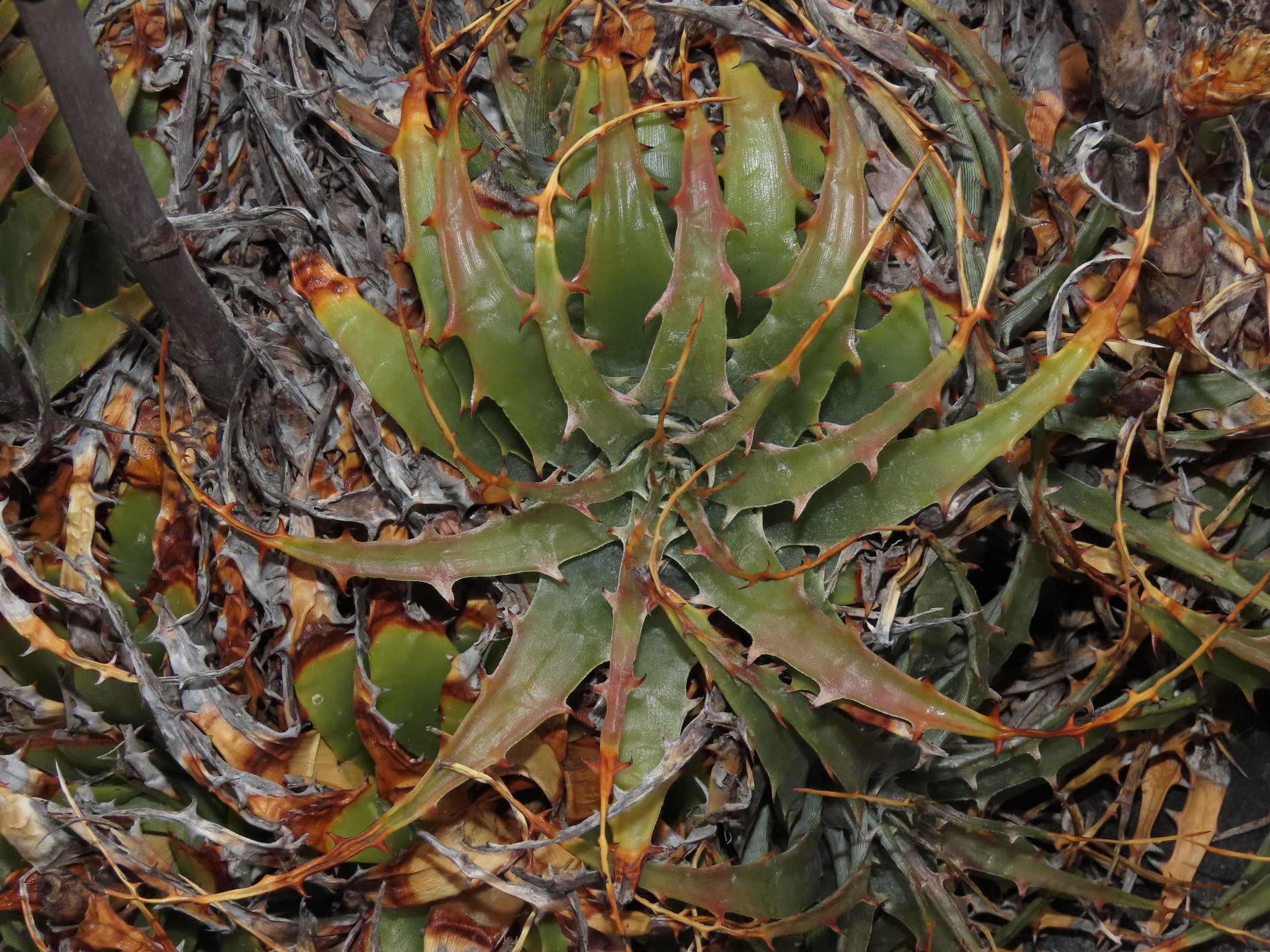

Scientific classification
- Kingdom: Plantae
- Clade: Tracheophytes
- Clade: Angiosperms
- Clade: Monocots
- Clade: Commelinids
- Order: Poales
- Family: Bromeliaceae
- Genus: Deuterocohnia
- Species: D. chrysantha

Binomial name
- Deuterocohnia chrysantha (Philippi) Mez

= Deuterocohnia chrysantha =

Species of plant

Deuterocohnia chrysantha is a plant species in the genus Deuterocohnia. This species is endemic to Chile.
