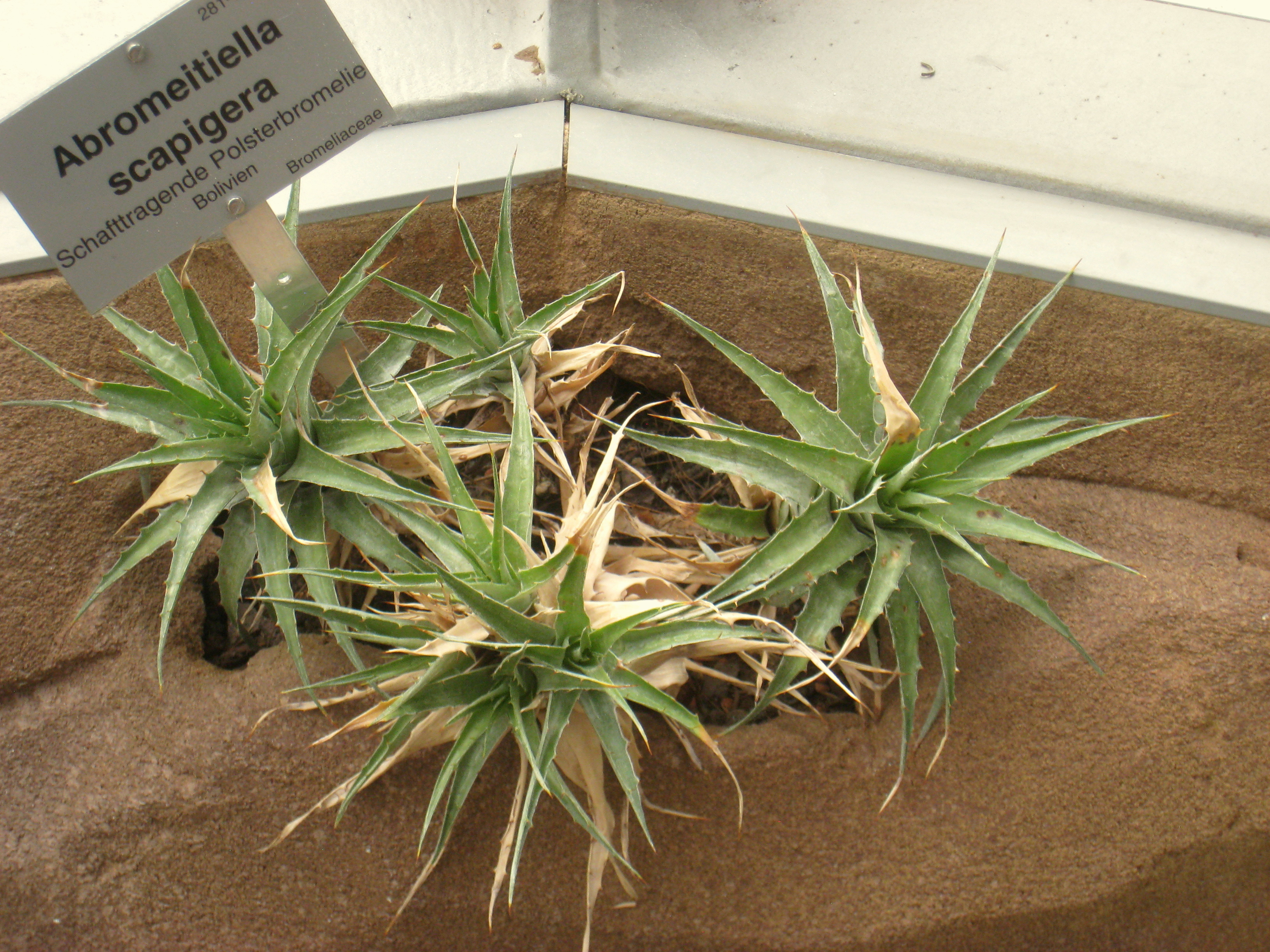
- Deuterocohnia scapigera (Abromeitiella scapigera)

Scientific classification
- Kingdom: Plantae
- Clade: Tracheophytes
- Clade: Angiosperms
- Clade: Monocots
- Clade: Commelinids
- Order: Poales
- Family: Bromeliaceae
- Genus: Deuterocohnia
- Species: D. scapigera

Binomial name
- Deuterocohnia scapigera (Rauh & L. Hromadnik) M.A. Spencer & L.B. Smith

= Deuterocohnia scapigera =

Species of flowering plant

Deuterocohnia scapigera is a plant species in the genus Deuterocohnia. This species is endemic to Bolivia.
