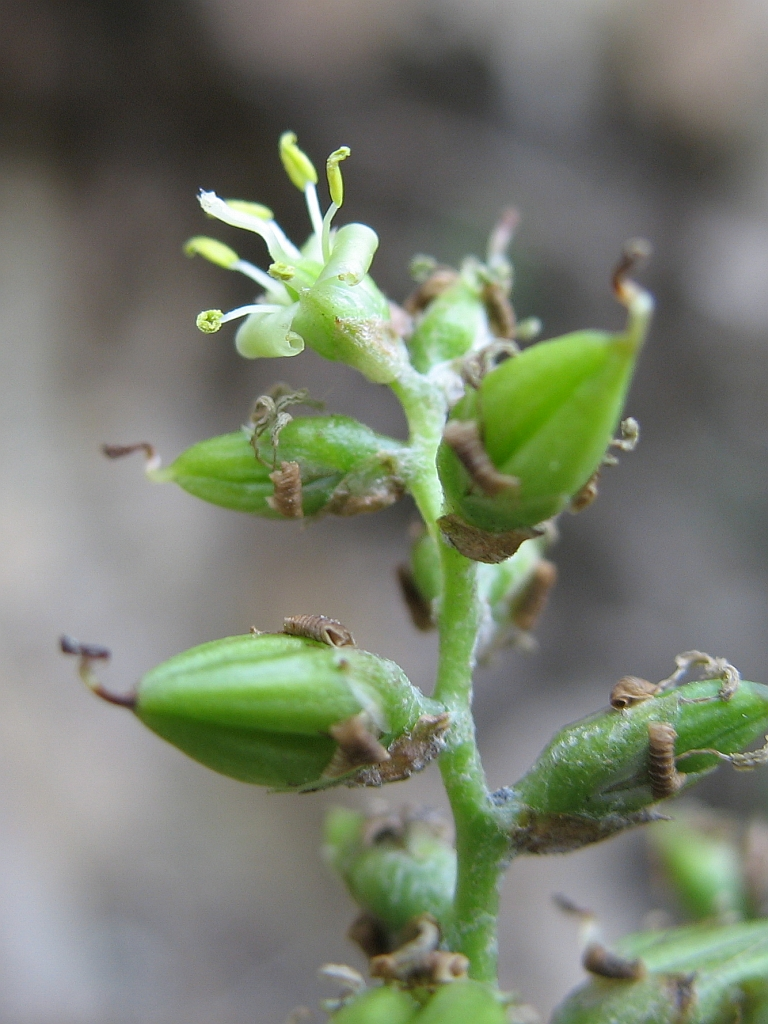
- Fosterella albicans inhabit Bolivia.

Scientific classification
- Kingdom: Plantae
- Clade: Tracheophytes
- Clade: Angiosperms
- Clade: Monocots
- Clade: Commelinids
- Order: Poales
- Family: Bromeliaceae
- Genus: Fosterella
- Species: F. albicans

Binomial name
- Fosterella albicans (Griseb.) L.B.Sm.

Synonyms
- Cottendorfia albicans Griseb.; Lindmania albicans (Griseb.) Mez; Fosterella fuentesii Ibisch, R.Vásquez & E.Gross

= Fosterella albicans =

Species of flowering plant

Fosterella albicans is a species of flowering plant in the family Bromeliaceae. This species is native to Bolivia and Argentina.
