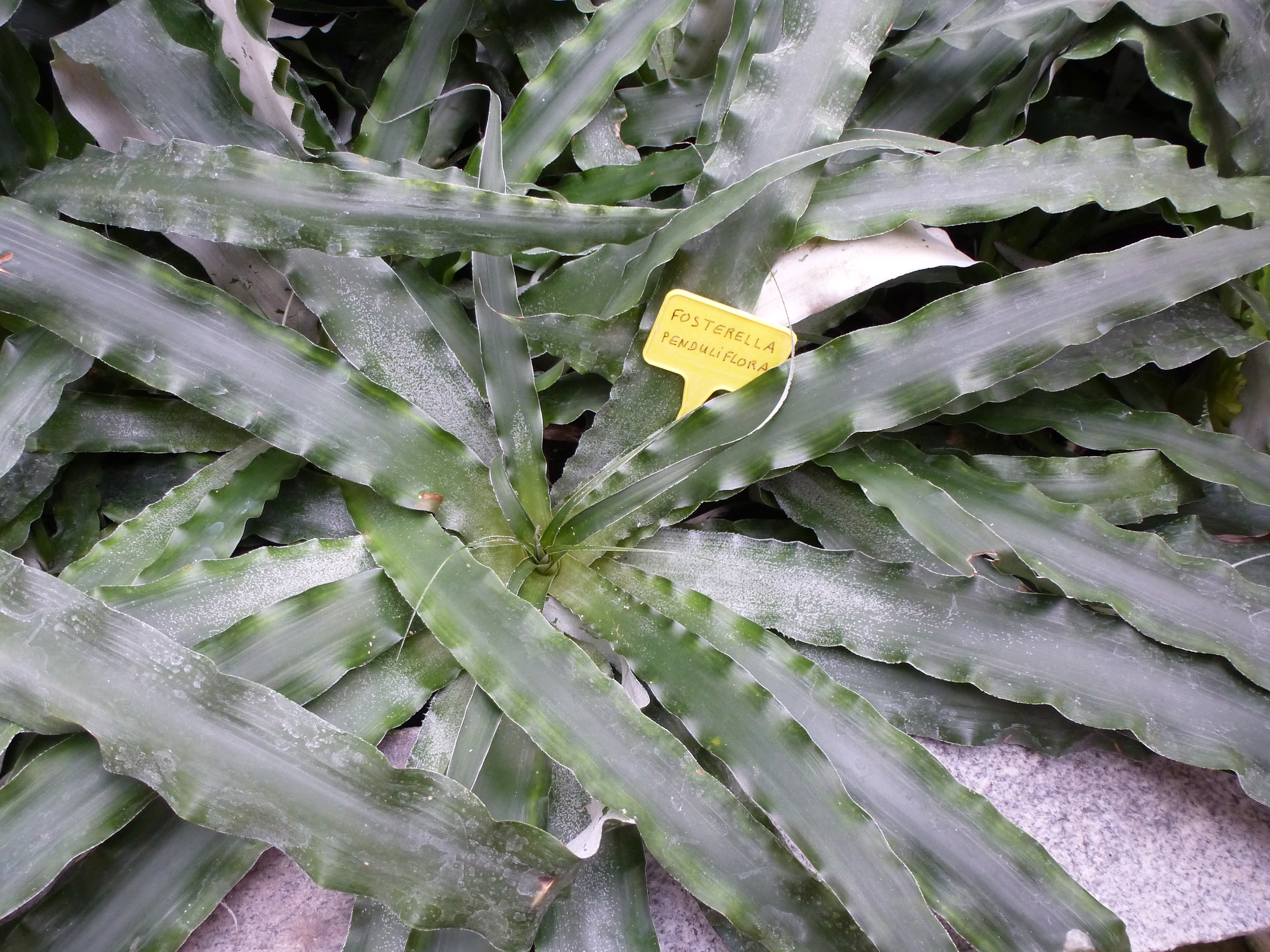
- Fosterella penduliflora

Scientific classification
- Kingdom: Plantae
- Clade: Tracheophytes
- Clade: Angiosperms
- Clade: Monocots
- Clade: Commelinids
- Order: Poales
- Family: Bromeliaceae
- Genus: Fosterella
- Species: F. penduliflora

Binomial name
- Fosterella penduliflora (C.H. Wright) L.B. Smith

Synonyms
- Catopsis penduliflora C.H.Wright; Lindmania penduliflora (C.H.Wright) Stapf; Fosterella chiquitana Ibisch, R.Vásquez & E.Gross; Fosterella latifolia Ibisch, R.Vásquez & E.Gross

= Fosterella penduliflora =

Species of flowering plant

Fosterella penduliflora is a plant species in the genus Fosterella. This species is native to Bolivia, Peru, and Argentina.
