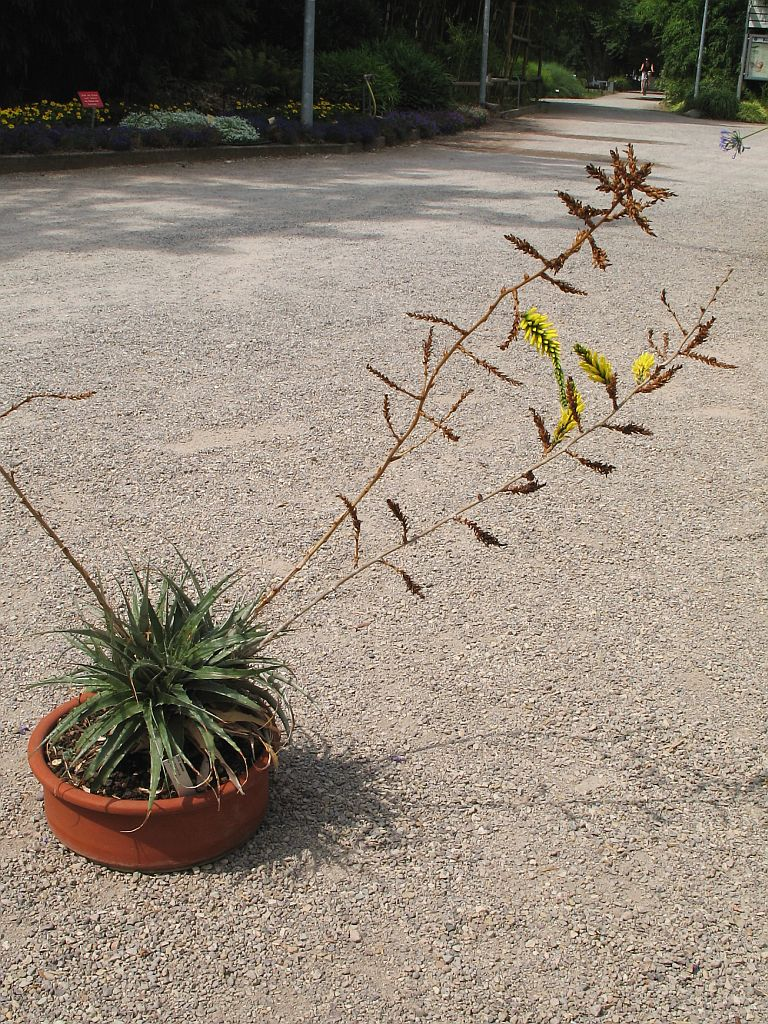

Scientific classification
- Kingdom: Plantae
- Clade: Tracheophytes
- Clade: Angiosperms
- Clade: Monocots
- Clade: Commelinids
- Order: Poales
- Family: Bromeliaceae
- Genus: Deuterocohnia
- Species: D. schreiteri

Binomial name
- Deuterocohnia schreiteri Castellanos

= Deuterocohnia schreiteri =

Species of flowering plant

Deuterocohnia schreiteri is a plant species in the genus Deuterocohnia.
