= Fosterella gracilis =

Scientific classification
- Kingdom: Plantae
- Clade: Tracheophytes
- Clade: Angiosperms
- Clade: Monocots
- Clade: Commelinids
- Order: Poales
- Family: Bromeliaceae
- Genus: Fosterella
- Species: F. gracilis

Binomial name
- Fosterella gracilis (Rusby) L.B. Smith

Species of flowering plant

Fosterella gracilis is a plant species in the genus Fosterella. This species is endemic to Bolivia.
