= Fosterella graminea =

Scientific classification
- Kingdom: Plantae
- Clade: Tracheophytes
- Clade: Angiosperms
- Clade: Monocots
- Clade: Commelinids
- Order: Poales
- Family: Bromeliaceae
- Genus: Fosterella
- Species: F. graminea

Binomial name
- Fosterella graminea (L.B.Sm.) L.B.Sm.

Species of flowering plant

Fosterella graminea is a plant species in the genus Fosterella. This species is endemic to Bolivia.
