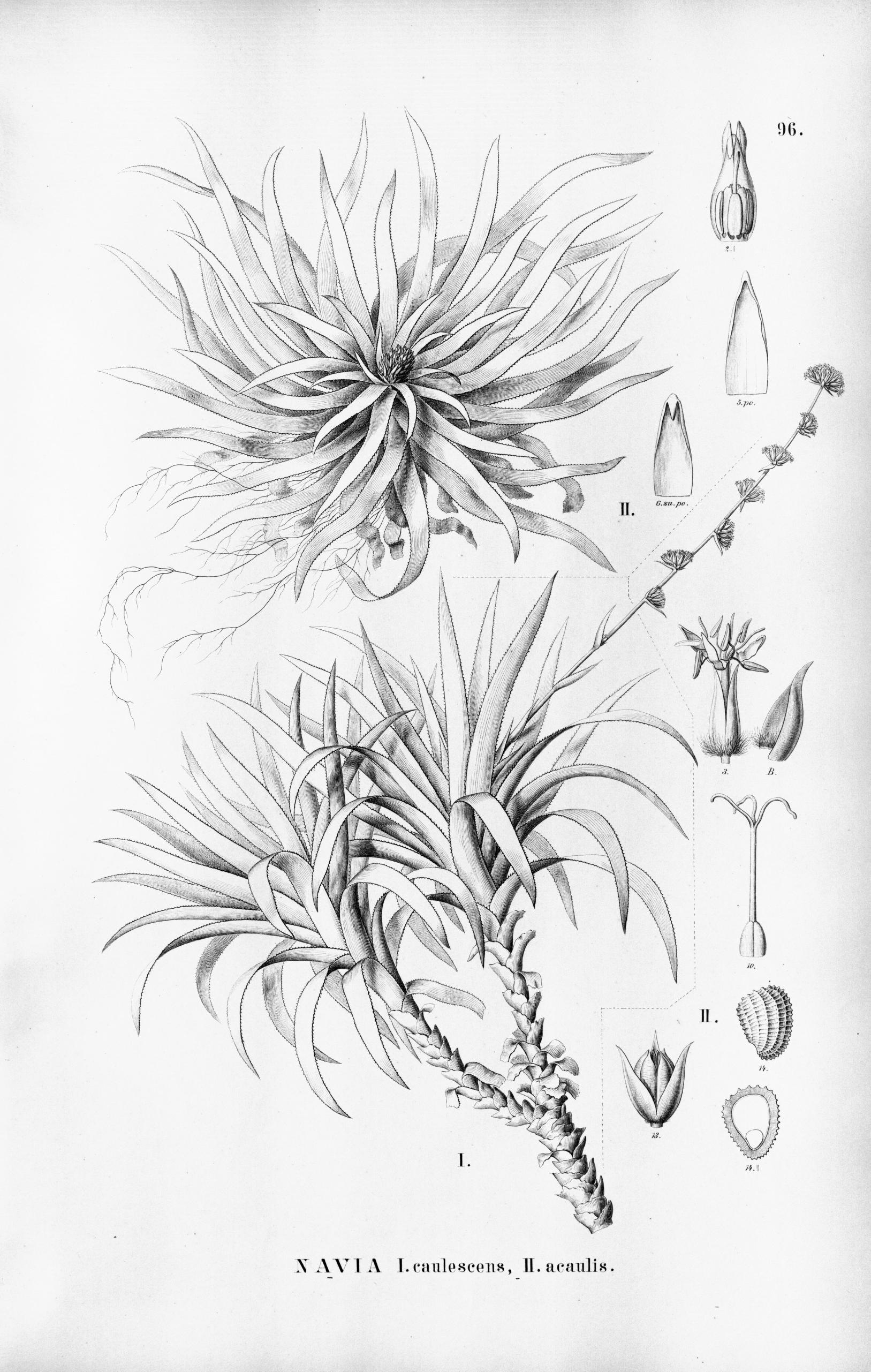
- Botanical illustration of Navia caulescens

Scientific classification
- Kingdom: Plantae
- Clade: Tracheophytes
- Clade: Angiosperms
- Clade: Monocots
- Clade: Commelinids
- Order: Poales
- Family: Bromeliaceae
- Subfamily: Navioideae; Harms

Genera
- See text.

= Navioideae =

Subfamily of plants

Navioideae is a subfamily of the bromeliad family, Bromeliaceae. It contains four or five genera, formerly placed in a more broadly defined subfamily Pitcairnioideae.

== Genera ==
As of November 2022, the Encyclopaedia of Bromeliads accepted five genera, while Plants of the World Online accepted four.

- Brewcaria L.B.Sm., Steyerm. & H.Rob. (may be included in Navia)
- Cottendorfia Schult.f.
- Navia Schult. & Schult.f.
- Sequencia (L.B.Sm.) Givnish
- Steyerbromelia L.B.Sm.
