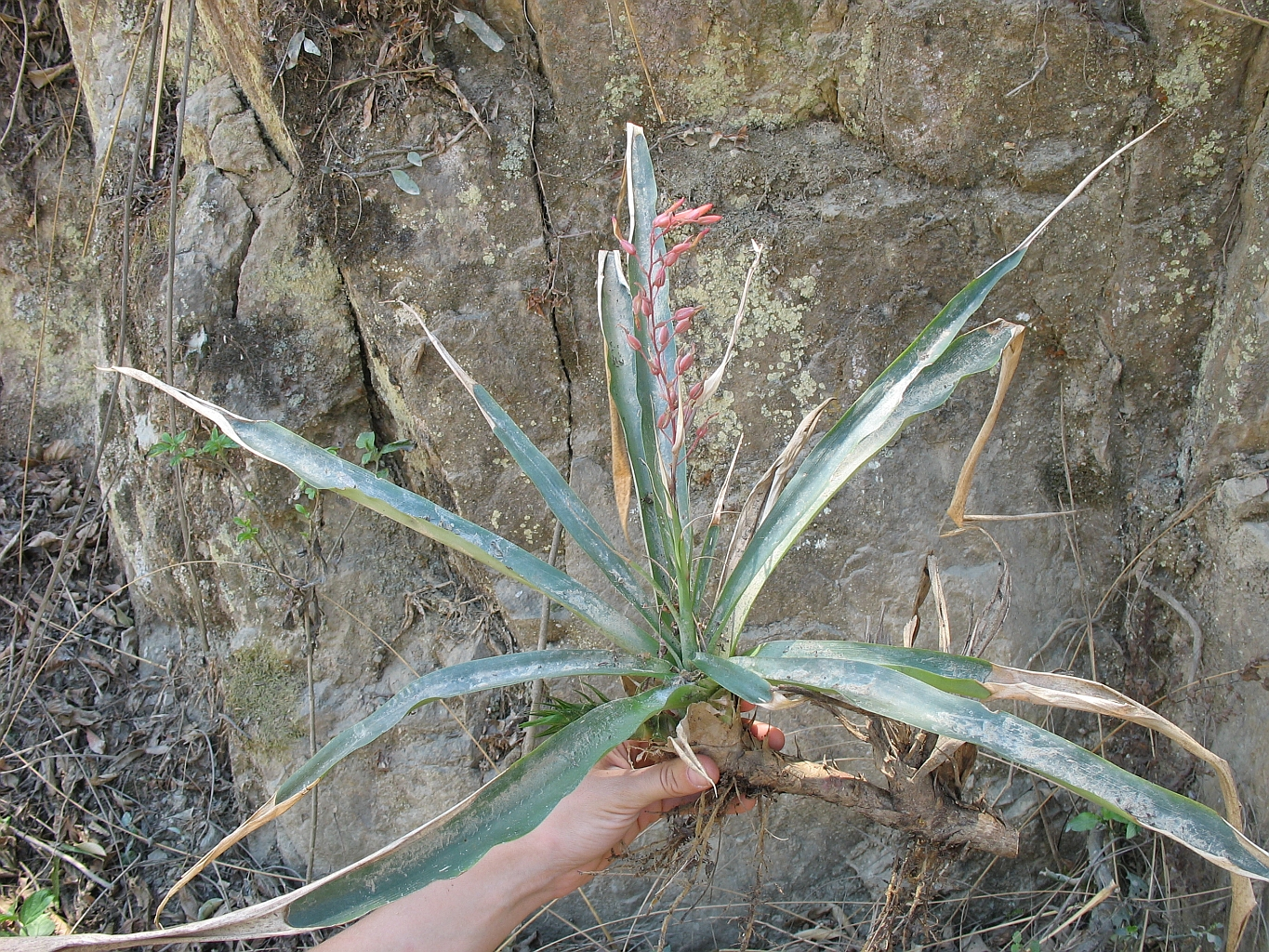

Scientific classification
- Kingdom: Plantae
- Clade: Tracheophytes
- Clade: Angiosperms
- Clade: Monocots
- Clade: Commelinids
- Order: Poales
- Family: Bromeliaceae
- Genus: Fosterella
- Species: F. spectabilis

Binomial name
- Fosterella spectabilis H. Luther

= Fosterella spectabilis =

Species of flowering plant

Fosterella spectabilis is a bromeliad species in the genus Fosterella. This species is endemic to Bolivia.
