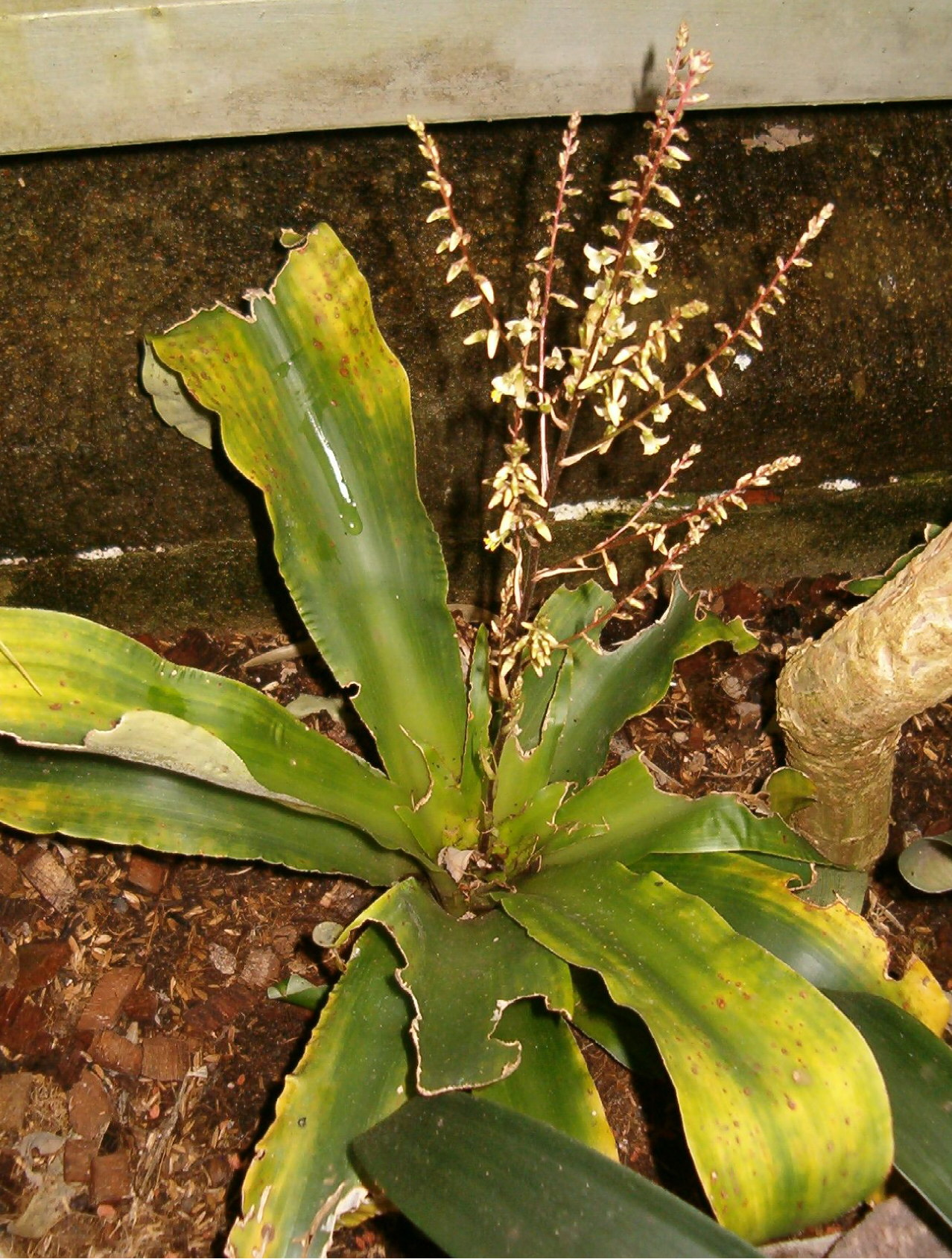
- Fosterella micrantha

Scientific classification
- Kingdom: Plantae
- Clade: Tracheophytes
- Clade: Angiosperms
- Clade: Monocots
- Clade: Commelinids
- Order: Poales
- Family: Bromeliaceae
- Subfamily: Pitcairnioideae
- Genus: Fosterella; L.B.Sm.

= Fosterella =

Genus of flowering plants

Fosterella is a genus of plants in the family Bromeliaceae, subfamily Pitcairnioideae. It contains 31 recognized species, 30 native to central and western South America, one to Mesoamerica. The genus is named after Mulford B. Foster, American horticulturist and collector (1888-1978).

== Species ==
- Fosterella albicans (Grisebach) L.B. Smith - Bolivia, Argentina
- Fosterella aletroides (L.B. Smith) L.B. Smith - Peru
- Fosterella batistana Ibisch, Leme & J.Peters - Pará
- Fosterella caulescens Rauh - Bolivia
- Fosterella chaparensis Ibisch, R. Vásquez & E. Gross - Bolivia
- Fosterella christophii Ibisch, R.Vásquez & J.Peters - Bolivia
- Fosterella cotacajensis Kessler, Ibisch & E. Gross - Bolivia
- Fosterella elviragrossiae Ibisch, R.Vásquez & J.Peters - Bolivia
- Fosterella floridensis Ibisch, R. Vásquez & E. Gross - Bolivia
- Fosterella gracilis (Rusby) L.B. Smith - Bolivia
- Fosterella graminea (L.B. Smith) L.B. Smith - Bolivia
- Fosterella hatschbachii L.B. Smith & R.W. Read - Mato Grosso
- Fosterella heterophylla Rauh - Bolivia
- Fosterella kroemeri Ibisch, R.Vásquez & J.Peters - Bolivia
- Fosterella micrantha (Lindley) L.B. Smith - Mexico (Nuevo León, Veracruz, Chiapas, Oaxaca, Guerrero), Guatemala, El Salvador
- Fosterella nicoliana J.Peters & Ibisch - Peru
- Fosterella pearcei (Baker) L.B. Smith - Bolivia
- Fosterella penduliflora (C.H. Wright) L.B. Smith - Bolivia, Peru, Argentina
- Fosterella petiolata (Mez) L.B. Smith - Bolivia, Peru
- Fosterella rexiae Ibisch, R. Vásquez & E. Gross - Bolivia
- Fosterella robertreadii Ibisch & J. Peters - Peru
- Fosterella rojasii (L.B. Smith) L.B. Smith - Paraguay, Bolivia
- Fosterella rusbyi (Mez) L.B. Smith - Bolivia, Peru
- Fosterella schidosperma (Baker) L.B. Smith - Peru
- Fosterella spectabilis H. Luther - Bolivia
- Fosterella vasquezii E. Gross & Ibisch - Bolivia
- Fosterella villosula (Harms) L.B. Smith - Bolivia
- Fosterella weberbaueri (Mez) L.B. Smith - Bolivia, Peru
- Fosterella weddelliana (Brongniart ex Baker) L.B. Smith - Bolivia
- Fosterella windischii L.B. Smith & R.W. Read - Mato Grosso, Bolivia
- Fosterella yuvinkae Ibisch, R. Vásquez, E. Gross & S. Reichle - Bolivia
