= Steyerbromelia diffusa =

Scientific classification
- Kingdom: Plantae
- Clade: Tracheophytes
- Clade: Angiosperms
- Clade: Monocots
- Clade: Commelinids
- Order: Poales
- Family: Bromeliaceae
- Genus: Steyerbromelia
- Species: S. diffusa

Binomial name
- Steyerbromelia diffusa L.B. Smith, Steyermark & Robinson

Species of flowering plant

Steyerbromelia diffusa is a plant species in the genus Steyerbromelia. This species is endemic to Venezuela.
