= Brewcaria reflexa =

Scientific classification
- Kingdom: Plantae
- Clade: Tracheophytes
- Clade: Angiosperms
- Clade: Monocots
- Clade: Commelinids
- Order: Poales
- Family: Bromeliaceae
- Genus: Brewcaria
- Species: B. reflexa

Binomial name
- Brewcaria reflexa (L.B.Sm.) B.Holst

Synonyms
- Navia reflexa L.B.Sm.; Navia gracilis L.B.Sm.

Species of flowering plant

Brewcaria reflexa is a species of plants in the genus Brewcaria. This species is native to Venezuela and Colombia.
