= Fosterella weddelliana =

Scientific classification
- Kingdom: Plantae
- Clade: Tracheophytes
- Clade: Angiosperms
- Clade: Monocots
- Clade: Commelinids
- Order: Poales
- Family: Bromeliaceae
- Genus: Fosterella
- Species: F. weddelliana

Binomial name
- Fosterella weddelliana (Brongn. ex Baker) L.B.Sm.

Synonyms
- Cottendorfia weddelliana Brongn. ex Baker; Fosterella nowickii Ibisch, R.Vásquez & E.Gross; Lindmania weddelliana (Brongn. ex Baker) Mez

Species of plant

Fosterella weddelliana is a species of flowering plant in the Bromeliaceae family. It is endemic to Bolivia.
