= Deuterocohnia strobilifera =

Scientific classification
- Kingdom: Plantae
- Clade: Embryophytes
- Clade: Tracheophytes
- Clade: Spermatophytes
- Clade: Angiosperms
- Clade: Monocots
- Clade: Commelinids
- Order: Poales
- Family: Bromeliaceae
- Genus: Deuterocohnia
- Species: D. strobilifera

Binomial name
- Deuterocohnia strobilifera Mez

Synonyms
- Homotypic Synonyms: Dyckia strobilifera (Mez) Forzza

Species of flowering plant

Deuterocohnia strobilifera is a species of flowering plant in the family Bromeliaceae. This species is native to Bolivia.
