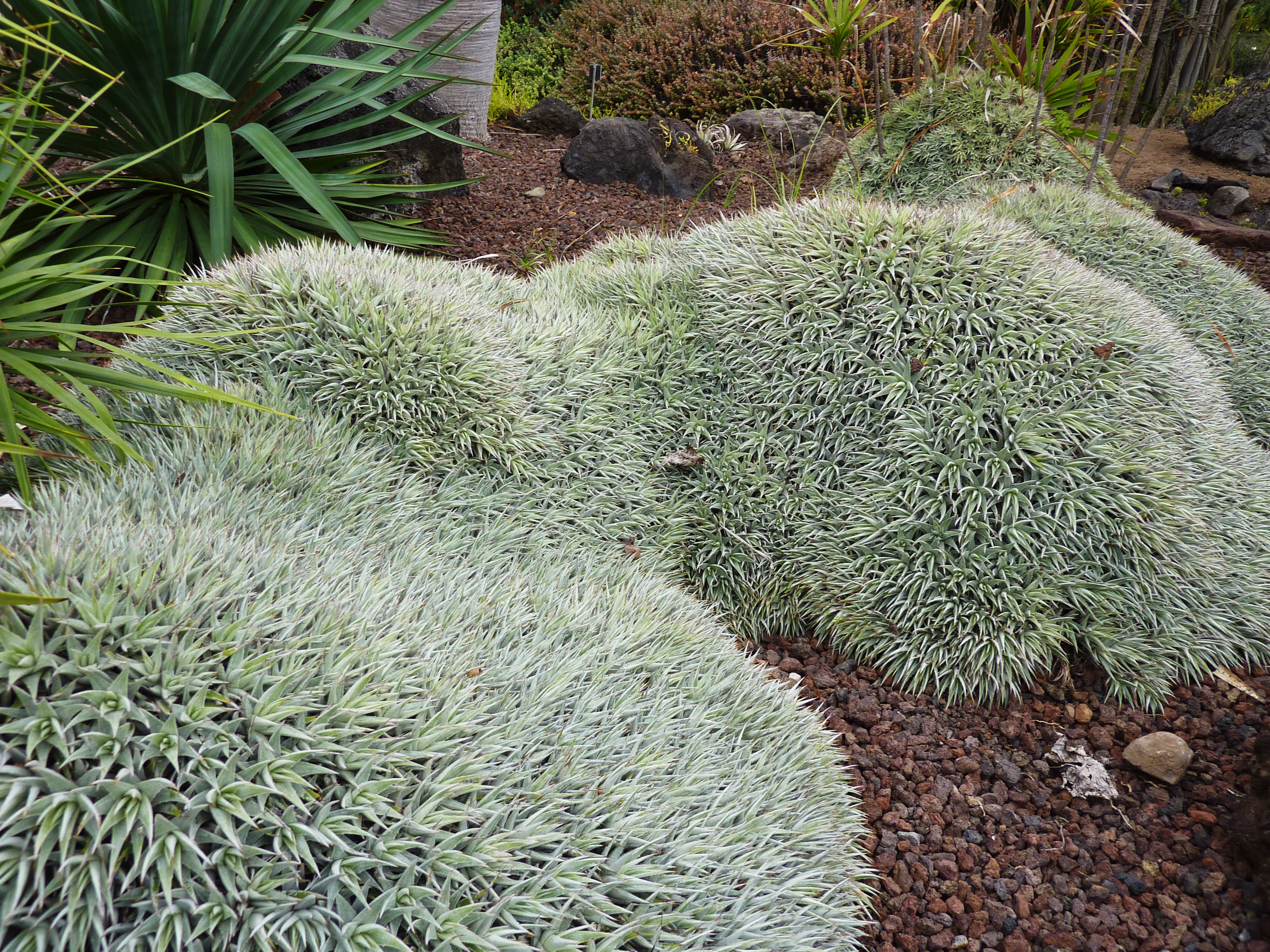
- Deuterocohnia brevifolia in the Jardín Botánico Canario Viera y Clavijo

Scientific classification
- Kingdom: Plantae
- Clade: Tracheophytes
- Clade: Angiosperms
- Clade: Monocots
- Clade: Commelinids
- Order: Poales
- Family: Bromeliaceae
- Genus: Deuterocohnia
- Species: D. brevifolia

Binomial name
- Deuterocohnia brevifolia (Griseb.) M.A.Spencer & L.B.Sm.

Synonyms
- Abromeitiella brevifolia (Griseb.) A.Cast.; Dyckia andina Forzza; Dyckia grisebachii Baker; Lindmania brevifolia (Griseb.) Hauman; Meziothamnus brevifolius (Griseb.) Harms; Navia brevifolia Griseb.; Pitcairnia brevifolia (Griseb.) R.E.Fr.; Abromeitiella brevifolia subsp. chlorantha (Speg.) W.Schultze-Motel; Abromeitiella chlorantha (Speg.) Mez; Abromeitiella lorentziana (Mez) A.Cast.; Abromeitiella pulvinata Mez; Deuterocohnia lorentziana (Mez) M.A.Spencer & L.B.Sm.; Hepetis lorentziana Mez; Lindmania chlorantha (Speg.) Hauman; Pitcairnia chlorantha (Speg.) A.Cast.; Pitcairnia lorentziana (Mez) Mez; Tillandsia chlorantha Speg.

= Deuterocohnia brevifolia =

Species of flowering plant

Deuterocohnia brevifolia is a species of plant in the family Bromeliaceae. This species is native to Argentina and Bolivia, but is also popular as a potted houseplant or ground cover elsewhere. A terrestrial species, it prefers sun or light shade and can grow in large dense mats of leaves given proper conditions.
