= Fosterella pearcei =

Scientific classification
- Kingdom: Plantae
- Clade: Tracheophytes
- Clade: Angiosperms
- Clade: Monocots
- Clade: Commelinids
- Order: Poales
- Family: Bromeliaceae
- Genus: Fosterella
- Species: F. pearcei

Binomial name
- Fosterella pearcei (Baker) L.B.Sm.

Synonyms
- Cottendorfia pearcei Baker; Lindmania pearcei (Baker) Mez

Species of plant

Fosterella pearcei is a species of flowering plant in the Bromeliaceae family. It is endemic to Bolivia.
