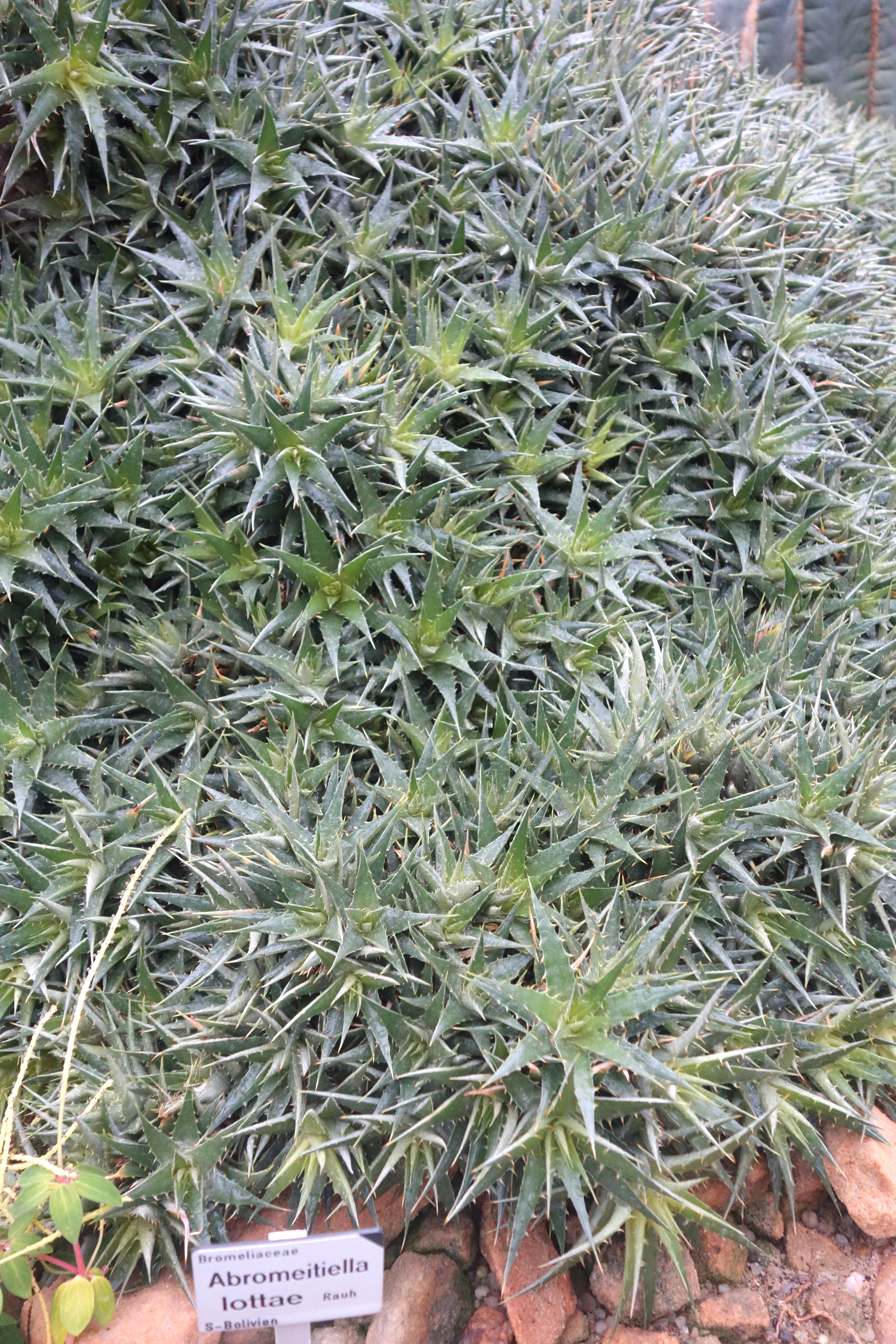

Scientific classification
- Kingdom: Plantae
- Clade: Tracheophytes
- Clade: Angiosperms
- Clade: Monocots
- Clade: Commelinids
- Order: Poales
- Family: Bromeliaceae
- Genus: Deuterocohnia
- Species: D. lotteae

Binomial name
- Deuterocohnia lotteae (Rauh) M.A. Spencer & L.B. Smith

= Deuterocohnia lotteae =

Species of flowering plant

Deuterocohnia lotteae is a plant species in the genus Deuterocohnia. This species is endemic to Bolivia at altitudes of 2500–3000 meters.

== Synonyms ==
- Abromeitiella lotteae Rauh
