= Steyerbromelia discolor =

Scientific classification
- Kingdom: Plantae
- Clade: Tracheophytes
- Clade: Angiosperms
- Clade: Monocots
- Clade: Commelinids
- Order: Poales
- Family: Bromeliaceae
- Genus: Steyerbromelia
- Species: S. discolor

Binomial name
- Steyerbromelia discolor L.B. Smith & Robinson

Species of flowering plant

Steyerbromelia discolor is a plant species in the genus Steyerbromelia. This species is endemic to Venezuela.
