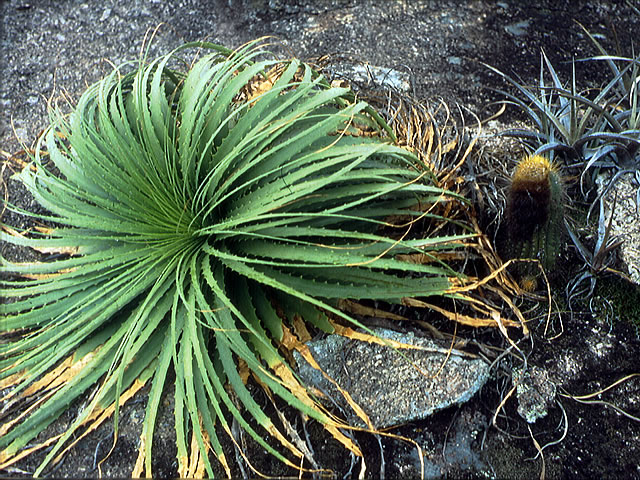
- Encholirium horridum

Scientific classification
- Kingdom: Plantae
- Clade: Tracheophytes
- Clade: Angiosperms
- Clade: Monocots
- Clade: Commelinids
- Order: Poales
- Family: Bromeliaceae
- Subfamily: Pitcairnioideae
- Genus: Encholirium; Schult. & Schult.f.

= Encholirium =

Genus of flowering plants

Encholirium is a genus of plants in the family Bromeliaceae, subfamily Pitcairnioideae. The entire genus is endemic to Brazil. The genus name is from the Greek “enchos” (spear) and “leiron” (lily).

This genus occur exclusively in arid, rocky conditions. Some species of Encholirium are limited in number and have been the focus of conservation efforts. These plants, which have been observed being pollinated by bats, are commonly confused with Dyckia.

== Species ==
1. Encholirium agavoides Forzza & Zappi
2. Encholirium ascendens Leme
3. Encholirium belemii L.B. Smith & R.W. Read
4. Encholirium biflorum (Mez) Forzza
5. Encholirium brachypodum L.B. Smith & R.W. Read
6. Encholirium bradeanum L.B. Smith
7. Encholirium ctenophyllum Forzza & Zappi
8. Encholirium disjunctum Forzza
9. Encholirium diamantinum Forzza
10. Encholirium eddie-estevesii Leme & Forzza
11. Encholirium erectiflorum L.B. Smith
12. Encholirium gracile L.B. Smith
13. Encholirium heloisae (L.B. Smith) Forzza & Wanderley
14. Encholirium horridum L.B. Smith
15. Encholirium irwinii L.B. Smith
16. Encholirium longiflorum Leme
17. Encholirium luxor L.B. Smith & R.W. Read
18. Encholirium lymanianum E. Pereira & Martinelli
19. Encholirium magalhaesii L.B. Smith
20. Encholirium maximum Forzza & Leme
21. Encholirium pedicellatum (Mez) Rauh
22. Encholirium pulchrum Forzza, Leme & O.B.C.Ribeiro
23. Encholirium reflexum Forzza & Wanderley
24. Encholirium scrutor (L.B. Smith) Rauh
25. Encholirium spectabile Martius ex Schult. & Schult.f.
26. Encholirium subsecundum (Baker) Mez
27. Encholirium vogelii Rauh
