= Fosterella schidosperma =

Scientific classification
- Kingdom: Plantae
- Clade: Tracheophytes
- Clade: Angiosperms
- Clade: Monocots
- Clade: Commelinids
- Order: Poales
- Family: Bromeliaceae
- Genus: Fosterella
- Species: F. schidosperma

Binomial name
- Fosterella schidosperma (Baker) L.B.Sm.

Synonyms
- Chlorophytum schidospermum Baker; Lindmania schidosperma (Baker) Ravenna; Schidospermum sanseviera Griseb.; Cottendorfia rusbyi Baker ex Rusby

Species of plant

Fosterella schidosperma is a species of flowering plant in Bromeliaceae family. It is native to Peru and Bolivia.

Two varieties are recognized:

- Fosterella schidosperma var. schidosperma;
- Fosterella schidosperma var. vestita L.B.Sm. & Read.
