= Fosterella rojasii =

Scientific classification
- Kingdom: Plantae
- Clade: Tracheophytes
- Clade: Angiosperms
- Clade: Monocots
- Clade: Commelinids
- Order: Poales
- Family: Bromeliaceae
- Genus: Fosterella
- Species: F. rojasii

Binomial name
- Fosterella rojasii (L.B.Sm.) L.B.Sm.

Synonyms
- Lindmania rojasii L.B.Sm.

Species of flowering plant

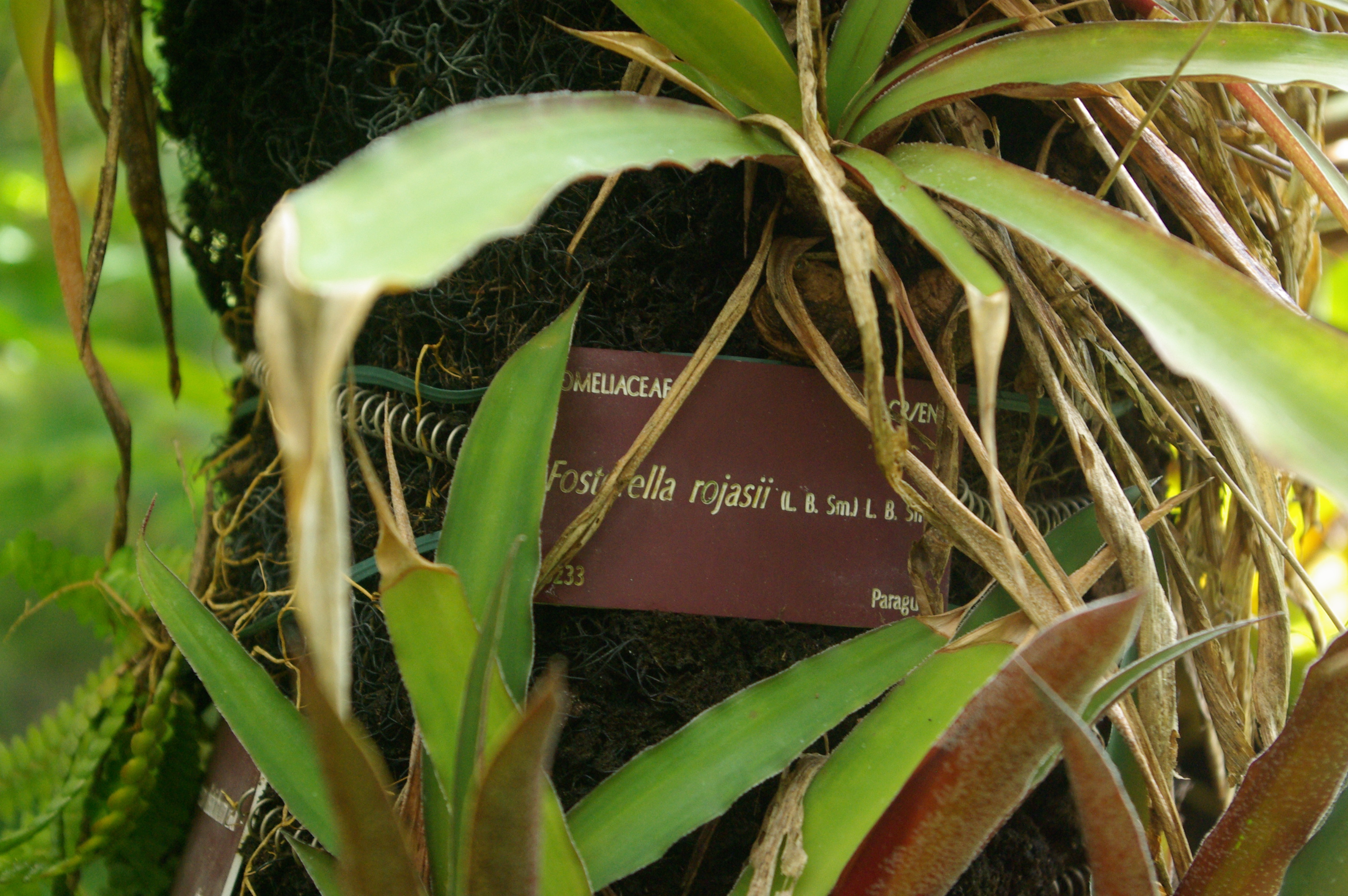
mature fosterella rojasii

Fosterella rojasii is a plant species in the genus Fosterella. This species is native to Bolivia and Paraguay.
