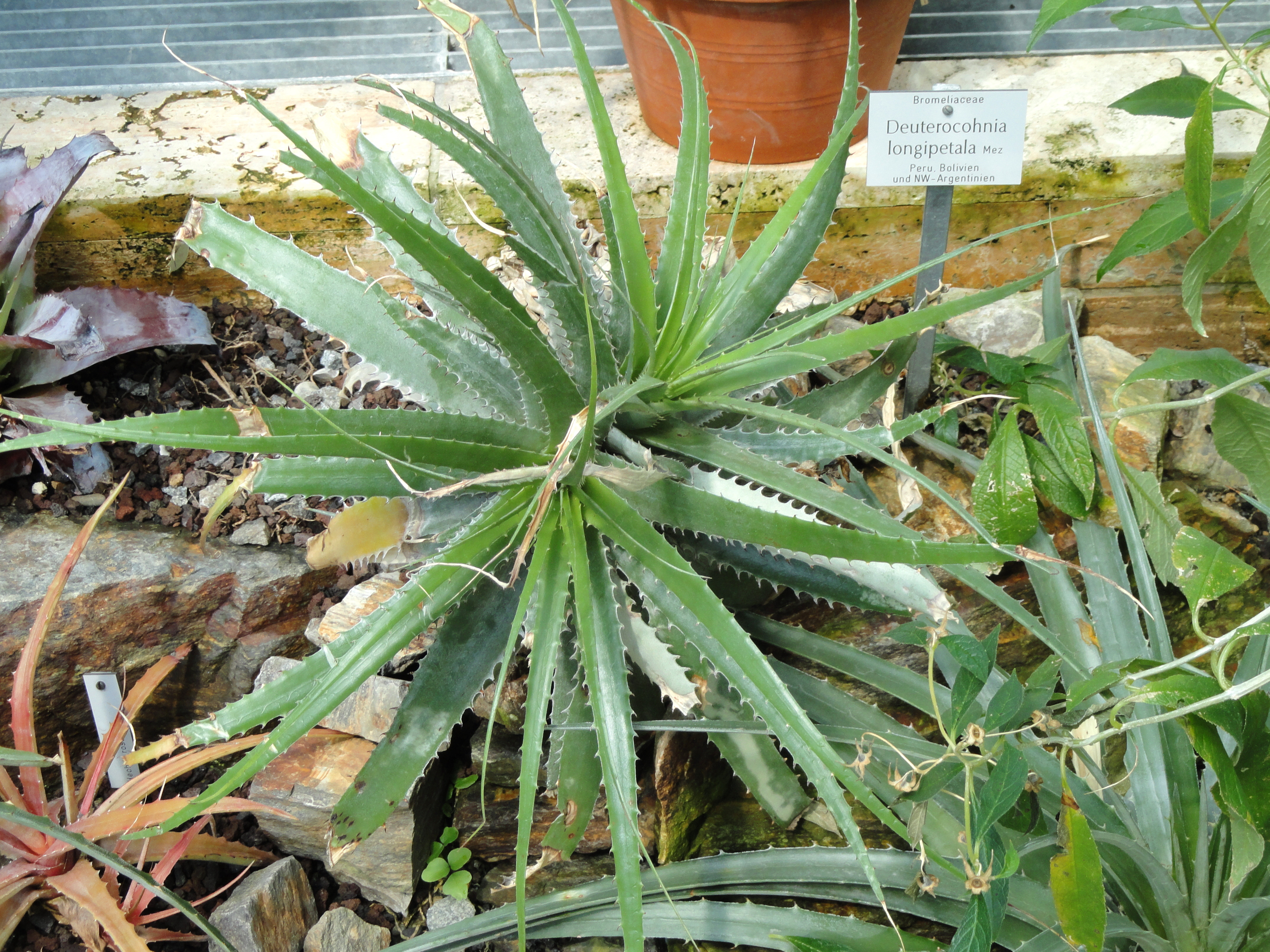

Scientific classification
- Kingdom: Plantae
- Clade: Tracheophytes
- Clade: Angiosperms
- Clade: Monocots
- Clade: Commelinids
- Order: Poales
- Family: Bromeliaceae
- Genus: Deuterocohnia
- Species: D. longipetala

Binomial name
- Deuterocohnia longipetala (Baker) Mez

Synonyms
- Deuterocohnia longipetala f. uberrima A.Cast. Dyckia decomposita Baker; Dyckia longipetala Baker

= Deuterocohnia longipetala =

Species of plant

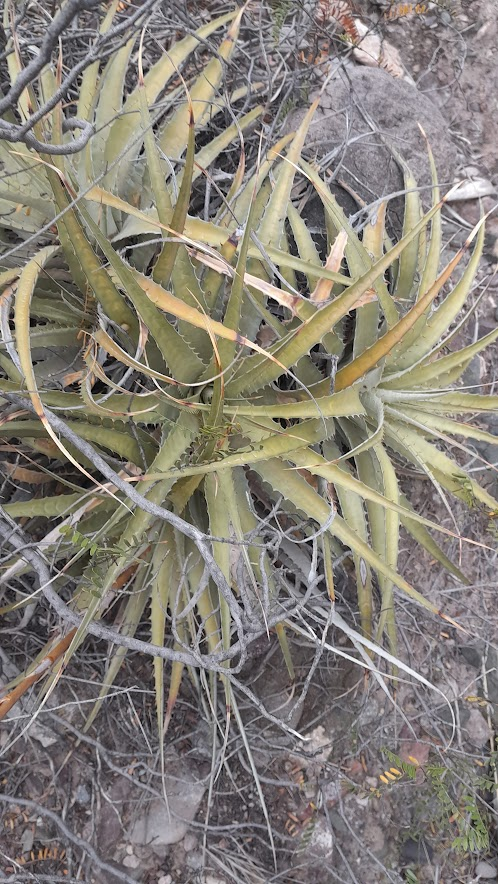
Deutherocohnia longipetala

Deuterocohnia longipetala is a species of flowering plant in the Bromeliaceae family. It is native to Peru, Bolivia and NW Argentina.
