= Deuterocohnia digitata =

Scientific classification
- Kingdom: Plantae
- Clade: Tracheophytes
- Clade: Angiosperms
- Clade: Monocots
- Clade: Commelinids
- Order: Poales
- Family: Bromeliaceae
- Genus: Deuterocohnia
- Species: D. digitata

Binomial name
- Deuterocohnia digitata L.B.Sm.

Species of flowering plant

Deuterocohnia digitata is a plant species in the genus Deuterocohnia. This species is native to Bolivia.
