= Steyerbromelia =

Scientific classification
- Kingdom: Plantae
- Clade: Tracheophytes
- Clade: Angiosperms
- Clade: Monocots
- Clade: Commelinids
- Order: Poales
- Family: Bromeliaceae
- Subfamily: Navioideae
- Genus: Steyerbromelia; L.B.Sm.

Genus of flowering plants

Steyerbromelia (named after Julian A. Steyermark, an American plant collector, author, and editor) is a genus of plants in the family Bromeliaceae, subfamily Navioideae. All the known species in the genus are native to southern Venezuela, northern Brazil and Colombia.

== Species ==
- Steyerbromelia deflexa L.B. Smith & Robinson
- Steyerbromelia diffusa L.B. Smith, Steyermark & Robinson
- Steyerbromelia discolor L.B. Smith & Robinson
- Steyerbromelia plowmanii (L.B. Smith, Steyermark & Robinson) Robinson & D. Taylor
- Steyerbromelia ramosa (L.B. Smith) B. Holst
- Steyerbromelia thomasii (L.B. Smith, Steyermark & Robinson) B. Holst

Kew also accepts;

- Steyerbromelia garcia-barrigae (L.B.Sm.) Aguirre-Santoro, Betancur & B.Holst
- Steyerbromelia naquenensis Betancur & Aguirre-Santoro
- Steyerbromelia neblinae B.Holst
- Steyerbromelia nukakii Betancur & Aguirre-Santoro
