= Sequencia =

Scientific classification
- Kingdom: Plantae
- Clade: Embryophytes
- Clade: Tracheophytes
- Clade: Spermatophytes
- Clade: Angiosperms
- Clade: Monocots
- Clade: Commelinids
- Order: Poales
- Family: Bromeliaceae
- Subfamily: Navioideae
- Genus: Sequencia; Givnish
- Species: S. serrata

Binomial name
- Sequencia serrata (L.B.Sm.) Givnish

Synonyms
- Brocchinia serrata L.B.Sm

Genus of flowering plants

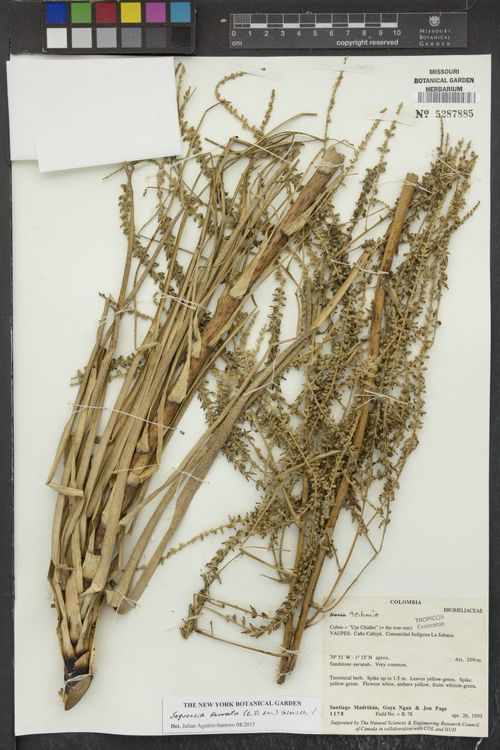
Sequencia serrata.

Sequencia is a monotypic genus of plants in the family Bromeliaceae. The sole species is Sequencia serrata (originally Brocchinia serrata), endemic to the Vaupés region of Colombia.

Formerly in the genus Brocchinia, the genus was separated based on DNA sequence details (hence its name) and restriction site characteristics. Some authorities are accepting the altered taxonomy, while others are not.
