= Brewcaria =

Scientific classification
- Kingdom: Plantae
- Clade: Embryophytes
- Clade: Tracheophytes
- Clade: Spermatophytes
- Clade: Angiosperms
- Clade: Monocots
- Clade: Commelinids
- Order: Poales
- Family: Bromeliaceae
- Subfamily: Navioideae
- Genus: Brewcaria; L.B.Sm., Steyerm. & H.Rob

Genus of flowering plants

Brewcaria is a genus of plants in the family Bromeliaceae. The genus is named for Charles Brewer-Carías, Venezuelan explorer and naturalist. Some authorities treat Brewcaria as a synonym of Navia. It contains 6 known species, all native to Colombia and Venezuela.

== Species ==
Six species are currently recognised:

- Brewcaria brocchinioides (L.B.Sm.) B.Holst - Amazonas of Venezuela
- Brewcaria duidensis L.B.Sm., Steyerm. & H.Rob. - Amazonas of Venezuela
- Brewcaria hechtioides (L.B.Sm.) B.Holst - Amazonas of Venezuela
- Brewcaria hohenbergioides (L.B.Sm.) B.Holst - Amazonas of Venezuela
- Brewcaria marahuacae L.B.Sm., Steyerm. & H.Rob. - Amazonas of Venezuela
- Brewcaria reflexa (L.B.Sm.) B.Holst - Colombia and Venezuela
