= Cottendorfia =

Scientific classification
- Kingdom: Plantae
- Clade: Tracheophytes
- Clade: Angiosperms
- Clade: Monocots
- Clade: Commelinids
- Order: Poales
- Family: Bromeliaceae
- Subfamily: Navioideae
- Genus: Cottendorfia; Schult. & Schult.f.
- Species: C. florida

Binomial name
- Cottendorfia florida Schult. & Schult.f.

Genus of flowering plants

Cottendorfia is a genus of plants in the family Bromeliaceae. The genus name is for Johann Georg Freiherr Cotta von Cottendorf, German patron of the sciences (1796-1863).

There is only one known species, Cottendorfia florida, endemic to northeastern Brazil (Bahia and Piauí).
