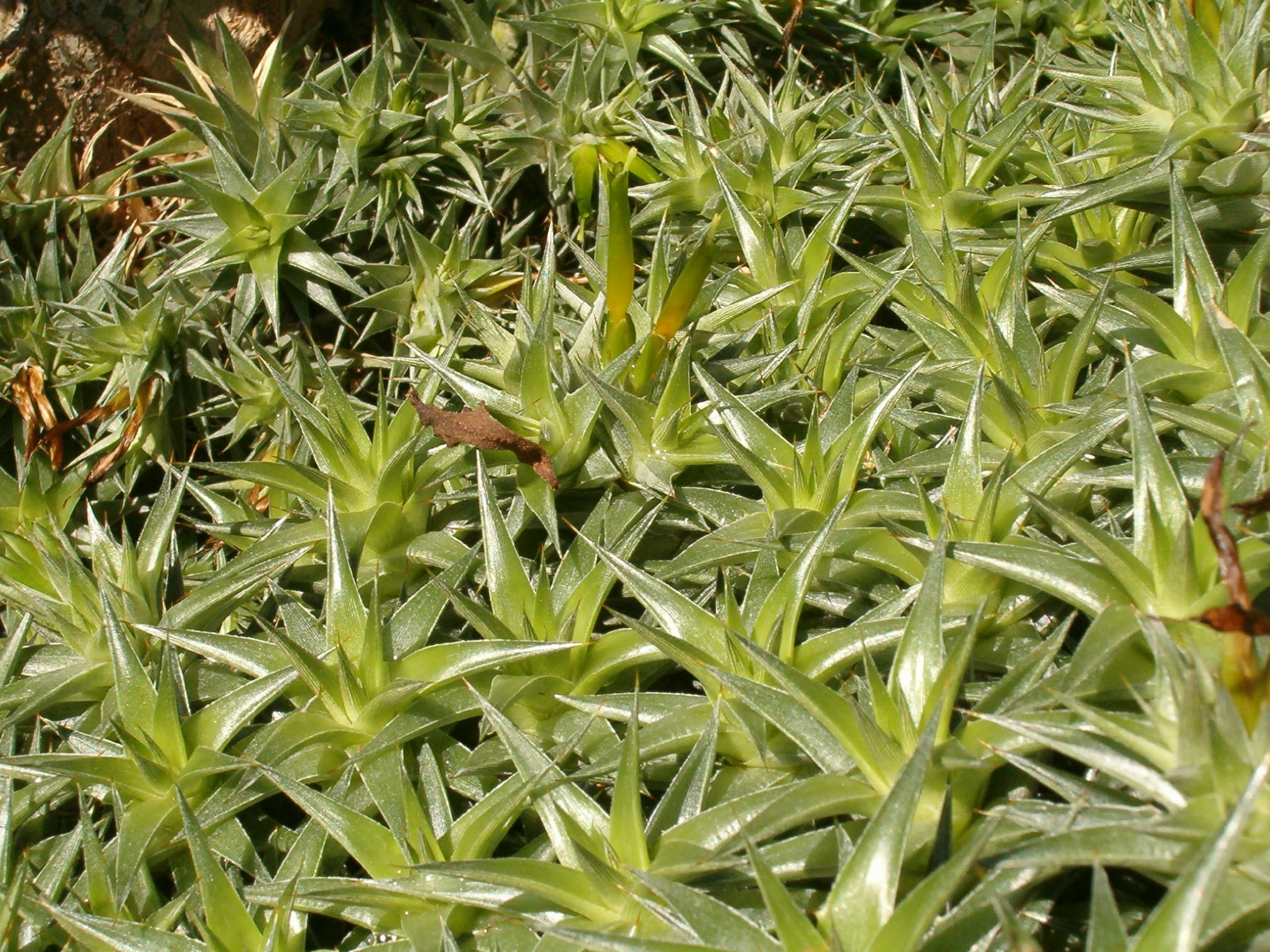
- Deuterocohnia lorentziana (now Deuterocohnia brevifolia)

Scientific classification
- Kingdom: Plantae
- Clade: Embryophytes
- Clade: Tracheophytes
- Clade: Spermatophytes
- Clade: Angiosperms
- Clade: Monocots
- Clade: Commelinids
- Order: Poales
- Family: Bromeliaceae
- Subfamily: Pitcairnioideae
- Genus: Deuterocohnia; Mez

Type species
- Deuterocohnia longipetala

Synonyms
- Abromeitiella Mez; Meziothamnus Harms

= Deuterocohnia =

Genus of flowering plants

Deuterocohnia is a genus of plants in the family Bromeliaceae, subfamily Pitcairnioideae, endemic to South America. The genus is named for Ferdinand Julius Cohn, Jewish botanist and bacteriologist.

Plants once described as belonging to the genus Abromeitiella have been reevaluated and reclassified within Deuterocohnia following modern DNA analysis.

== Species ==
Image	Scientific name	Distribution
	Deuterocohnia abstrusa (A.Cast.) N.Schuetz	Argentina (Catamarca)
	Deuterocohnia brevifolia (Grisebach) M.A. Spencer & L.B. Smith	Bolivia, Argentina
	Deuterocohnia brevispicata Rauh & L. Hromadnik	Bolivia
	Deuterocohnia chrysantha (Philippi) Mez	Chile
	Deuterocohnia digitata L.B. Smith	Bolivia, Argentina
	Deuterocohnia gableana Vásquez & Ibisch	Bolivia
	Deuterocohnia glandulosa E. Gross	Bolivia
	Deuterocohnia haumanii Castellanos	Argentina
	Deuterocohnia longipetala (Baker) Mez	Bolivia, Argentina, Peru
	Deuterocohnia lotteae (Rauh) M.A. Spencer & L.B. Smith	Bolivia
	Deuterocohnia meziana Kuntze ex Mez	Bolivia.
	Deuterocohnia recurvipetala E. Gross	Argentina
	Deuterocohnia scapigera (Rauh & L. Hromadnik) M.A. Spencer & L.B. Smith	Bolivia.
	Deuterocohnia schreiteri Castellanos	Argentina
	Deuterocohnia seramisiana R. Vásquez, Ibisch & E. Gross	Bolivia
	Deuterocohnia strobilifera Mez	Bolivia.
