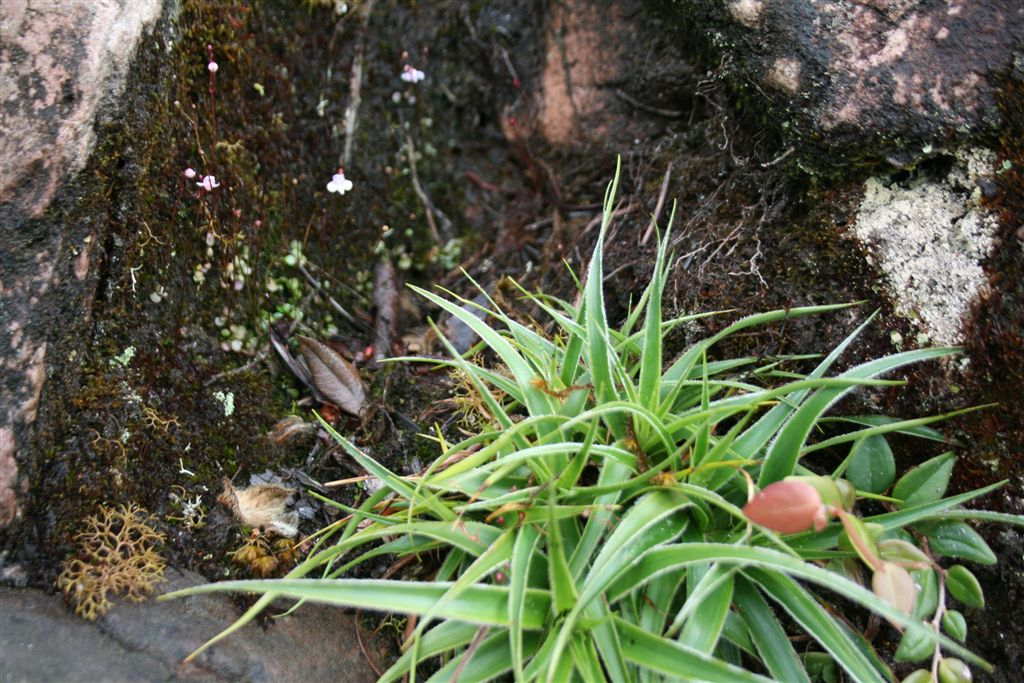
- Connellia quelchii

Scientific classification
- Kingdom: Plantae
- Clade: Tracheophytes
- Clade: Angiosperms
- Clade: Monocots
- Clade: Commelinids
- Order: Poales
- Family: Bromeliaceae
- Subfamily: Lindmanioideae; Givnish

Genera
- Connellia N.E.Br.; Lindmania Mez

= Lindmanioideae =

Subfamily of plants

Lindmanioideae is a subfamily of the bromeliad family, Bromeliaceae. It contains two genera, which were formerly placed in a more broadly defined subfamily Pitcairnioideae.

== Genera ==
Image	Genus	Living species
	Connellia N.E.Br.	Connellia augustae (R. Schomburgk) N.E. Brown; Connellia caricifolia L.B. Smith; Connellia nahoumii Leme; Connellia nutans L.B. Smith; Connellia quelchii N.E. Brown; Connellia varadarajanii L.B. Smith & Steyermark
	Lindmania	Lindmania arachnoidea (L.B. Smith, Steyermark & Robinson) L.B. Smith; Lindmania argentea L.B. Smith; Lindmania atrorosea (L.B. Smith, Steyermark & Robinson) L.B. Smith; Lindmania aurea L.B. Smith, Steyermark & Robinson; Lindmania brachyphylla L.B. Smith; Lindmania candelabriformis B. Holst; Lindmania cylindrostachya L.B. Smith; Lindmania dendritica (L.B. Smith) L.B. Smith; Lindmania dyckioides (L.B. Smith) L.B. Smith; Lindmania geniculata L.B. Smith; Lindmania gracillima (L.B. Smith) L.B. Smith; Lindmania guianensis (Beer) Mez; Lindmania holstii Steyermark & L.B. Smith; Lindmania huberi L.B. Smith, Steyermark & Robinson; Lindmania imitans L.B. Smith, Steyermark & Robinson; Lindmania lateralis (L.B. Smith & R.W. Read) L.B. Smith & Robinson; Lindmania longipes (L.B. Smith) L.B. Smith; Lindmania maguirei (L.B. Smith) L.B. Smith; Lindmania marahuacae (L.B. Smith, Steyermark & Robinson) L.B. Smith; Lindmania minor L.B. Smith; Lindmania navioides L.B. Smith; Lindmania nubigena (L.B. Smith) L.B. Smith; Lindmania oliva-estevae Steyermark & L.B. Smith ex B. Holst; Lindmania phelpsiae L.B. Smith; Lindmania piresii L.B. Smith, Steyermark & Robinson; Lindmania riparia L.B. Smith, Steyermark & Robinson; Lindmania saxicola L.B. Smith, Steyermark & Robinson; Lindmania serrulata L.B. Smith; Lindmania smithiana (Steyermark & Luteyn) L.B. Smith; Lindmania stenophylla L.B. Smith; Lindmania steyermarkii L.B. Smith; Lindmania subsimplex L.B. Smith; Lindmania thyrsoidea L.B. Smith; Lindmania tillandsioides L.B. Smith; Lindmania vinotincta B.Holst & Vivas; Lindmania wurdackii L.B. Smith
