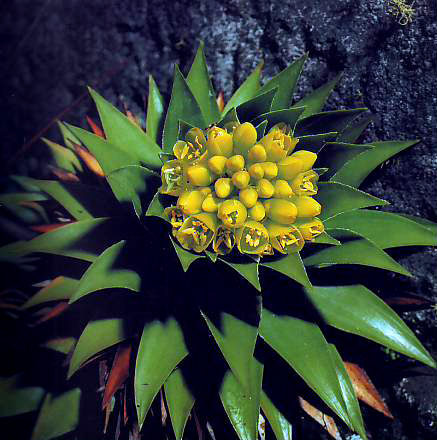
- Lindmania navioides

Scientific classification
- Kingdom: Plantae
- Clade: Embryophytes
- Clade: Tracheophytes
- Clade: Spermatophytes
- Clade: Angiosperms
- Clade: Monocots
- Clade: Commelinids
- Order: Poales
- Family: Bromeliaceae
- Subfamily: Lindmanioideae
- Genus: Lindmania; Mez

= Lindmania =

Genus of flowering plants

Lindmania is a genus of plants in the family Bromeliaceae. It is one of two genera in the subfamily Lindmanioideae, and contains 39 species. All but one of the known species are native to Venezuela, a few occurring in neighboring Guyana and northern Brazil.

The genus name is for Carl Axel Magnus Lindman, Swedish botanist (1856–1928).

== Species ==
- Lindmania arachnoidea (L.B. Smith, Steyermark & Robinson) L.B. Smith - Venezuelan State of Amazonas
- Lindmania argentea L.B. Smith - Bolívar
- Lindmania atrorosea (L.B. Smith, Steyermark & Robinson) L.B. Smith - Bolívar
- Lindmania aurea L.B. Smith, Steyermark & Robinson - Bolívar
- Lindmania brachyphylla L.B. Smith - Bolívar
- Lindmania candelabriformis B. Holst - Venezuelan State of Amazonas
- Lindmania cylindrostachya L.B. Smith - Venezuelan State of Amazonas
- Lindmania dendritica (L.B. Smith) L.B. Smith - Cerro de la Neblina (Venezuelan State of Amazonas and Brazilian State of Amazonas)
- Lindmania dyckioides (L.B. Smith) L.B. Smith - Bolívar
- Lindmania geniculata L.B. Smith - Venezuelan States of Amazonas and Bolívar
- Lindmania gracillima (L.B. Smith) L.B. Smith - Bolívar
- Lindmania guianensis (Beer) Mez - Guyana, Bolívar
- Lindmania holstii Steyermark & L.B. Smith - Bolívar
- Lindmania huberi L.B. Smith, Steyermark & Robinson - Bolívar
- Lindmania imitans L.B. Smith, Steyermark & Robinson - Bolívar
- Lindmania lateralis (L.B. Smith & R.W. Read) L.B. Smith & Robinson - Venezuelan State of Amazonas
- Lindmania longipes (L.B. Smith) L.B. Smith - Bolívar
- Lindmania maguirei (L.B. Smith) L.B. Smith - Cerro de la Neblina (Venezuelan State of Amazonas and Brazilian State of Amazonas)
- Lindmania marahuacae (L.B. Smith, Steyermark & Robinson) L.B. Smith - Venezuelan State of Amazonas
- Lindmania minor L.B. Smith - Bolívar
- Lindmania navioides L.B. Smith - Bolívar
- Lindmania nubigena (L.B. Smith) L.B. Smith - Venezuelan State of Amazonas
- Lindmania oliva-estevae Steyermark & L.B. Smith ex B. Holst - Bolívar
- Lindmania phelpsiae L.B. Smith - Venezuelan State of Amazonas
- Lindmania piresii L.B. Smith, Steyermark & Robinson - Brazilian State of Amazonas
- Lindmania riparia L.B. Smith, Steyermark & Robinson - Bolívar
- Lindmania saxicola L.B. Smith, Steyermark & Robinson - Bolívar
- Lindmania serrulata L.B. Smith - Bolívar
- Lindmania smithiana (Steyermark & Luteyn) L.B. Smith - Bolívar
- Lindmania stenophylla L.B. Smith - Bolívar
- Lindmania steyermarkii L.B. Smith - Bolívar
- Lindmania subsimplex L.B. Smith - Bolívar
- Lindmania thyrsoidea L.B. Smith - Venezuelan State of Amazonas
- Lindmania tillandsioides L.B. Smith - Bolívar
- Lindmania vinotincta B.Holst & Vivas - Bolívar
- Lindmania wurdackii L.B. Smith - Venezuelan State of Amazonas
