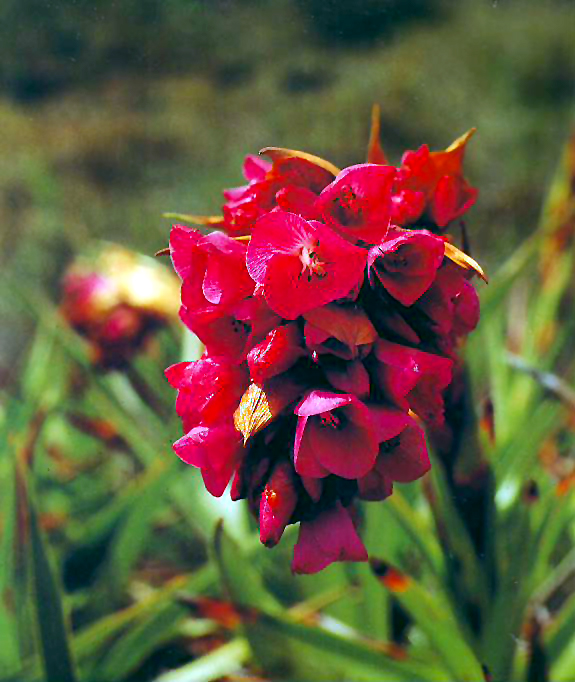
- Connellia augustae

Scientific classification
- Kingdom: Plantae
- Clade: Tracheophytes
- Clade: Angiosperms
- Clade: Monocots
- Clade: Commelinids
- Order: Poales
- Family: Bromeliaceae
- Subfamily: Lindmanioideae
- Genus: Connellia; N.E.Br.

= Connellia =

Genus of flowering plants

Connellia is a genus of plants in the family Bromeliaceae. The genus name is for Frederick Vavasour McConnell, English ornithologist and biologist (1868-1914). There are 6 known species, all native to the Guyana Highlands of Guyana and Venezuela.

== Species ==
- Connellia augustae (R. Schomburgk) N.E. Brown
- Connellia caricifolia L.B. Smith
- Connellia nahoumii Leme
- Connellia nutans L.B. Smith
- Connellia quelchii N.E. Brown
- Connellia varadarajanii L.B. Smith & Steyermark
