= Connellia nutans =

Scientific classification
- Kingdom: Plantae
- Clade: Tracheophytes
- Clade: Angiosperms
- Clade: Monocots
- Clade: Commelinids
- Order: Poales
- Family: Bromeliaceae
- Genus: Connellia
- Species: C. nutans

Binomial name
- Connellia nutans L.B.Sm.

Species of flowering plant

Connellia nutans is a plant species in the genus Connellia. This species is endemic to Venezuela.
