= Lindmania aurea =

Scientific classification
- Kingdom: Plantae
- Clade: Tracheophytes
- Clade: Angiosperms
- Clade: Monocots
- Clade: Commelinids
- Order: Poales
- Family: Bromeliaceae
- Genus: Lindmania
- Species: L. aurea

Binomial name
- Lindmania aurea L.B. Smith, Steyermark & Robinson

Species of flowering plant

Lindmania aurea is a plant species in the genus Lindmania. This species is endemic to Venezuela.
