= Connellia varadarajanii =

Scientific classification
- Kingdom: Plantae
- Clade: Tracheophytes
- Clade: Angiosperms
- Clade: Monocots
- Clade: Commelinids
- Order: Poales
- Family: Bromeliaceae
- Genus: Connellia
- Species: C. varadarajanii

Binomial name
- Connellia varadarajanii L.B. Smith & Steyermark

Species of flowering plant

Connellia varadarajanii is a plant species in the genus Connellia. This species is endemic to Venezuela.
