= Lindmania wurdackii =

Scientific classification
- Kingdom: Plantae
- Clade: Tracheophytes
- Clade: Angiosperms
- Clade: Monocots
- Clade: Commelinids
- Order: Poales
- Family: Bromeliaceae
- Genus: Lindmania
- Species: L. wurdackii

Binomial name
- Lindmania wurdackii L.B.Sm.

Species of flowering plant

Lindmania wurdackii is a plant species in the genus Lindmania. This species is endemic to Venezuela.
