= Lindmania dyckioides =

Scientific classification
- Kingdom: Plantae
- Clade: Tracheophytes
- Clade: Angiosperms
- Clade: Monocots
- Clade: Commelinids
- Order: Poales
- Family: Bromeliaceae
- Genus: Lindmania
- Species: L. dyckioides

Binomial name
- Lindmania dyckioides (L.B.Sm.) L.B.Sm.

Species of flowering plant

Lindmania dyckioides is a plant species in the genus Lindmania. This species is endemic to Venezuela.
