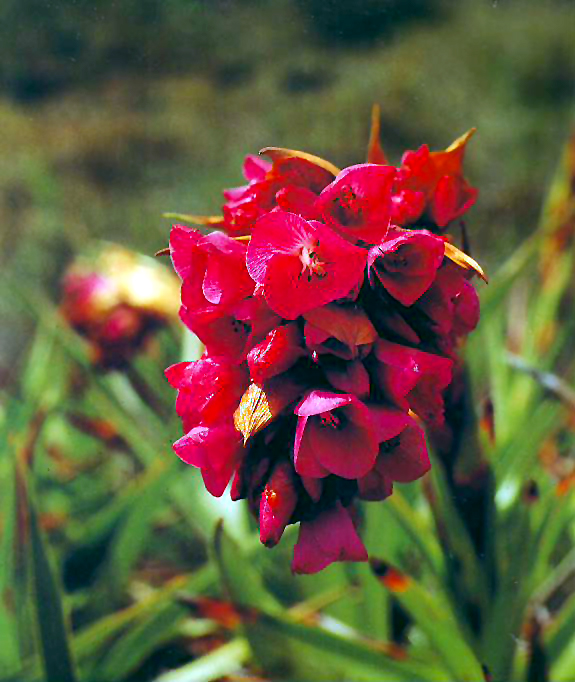

Scientific classification
- Kingdom: Plantae
- Clade: Tracheophytes
- Clade: Angiosperms
- Clade: Monocots
- Clade: Commelinids
- Order: Poales
- Family: Bromeliaceae
- Genus: Connellia
- Species: C. augustae

Binomial name
- Connellia augustae (M.R.Schomb.) N.E.Br.

= Connellia augustae =

Species of flowering plant

Connellia augustae is a plant species in the genus Connellia. This species is native to Venezuela.
