= Lindmania thyrsoidea =

Scientific classification
- Kingdom: Plantae
- Clade: Tracheophytes
- Clade: Angiosperms
- Clade: Monocots
- Clade: Commelinids
- Order: Poales
- Family: Bromeliaceae
- Genus: Lindmania
- Species: L. thyrsoidea

Binomial name
- Lindmania thyrsoidea L.B.Sm.

Species of flowering plant

Lindmania thyrsoidea is a plant species in the genus Lindmania. This species is endemic to Venezuela.
