= Lindmania atrorosea =

Scientific classification
- Kingdom: Plantae
- Clade: Tracheophytes
- Clade: Angiosperms
- Clade: Monocots
- Clade: Commelinids
- Order: Poales
- Family: Bromeliaceae
- Genus: Lindmania
- Species: L. atrorosea

Binomial name
- Lindmania atrorosea (L.B. Smith, Steyermark & Robinson) L.B. Smith

Species of flowering plant

Lindmania atrorosea is a plant species in the genus Lindmania. This species is endemic to Venezuela.
