= Lindmania nubigena =

Scientific classification
- Kingdom: Plantae
- Clade: Embryophytes
- Clade: Tracheophytes
- Clade: Spermatophytes
- Clade: Angiosperms
- Clade: Monocots
- Clade: Commelinids
- Order: Poales
- Family: Bromeliaceae
- Genus: Lindmania
- Species: L. nubigena

Binomial name
- Lindmania nubigena (L.B.Sm.) L.B.Sm.

Species of flowering plant

Lindmania nubigena is a bromeliad plant species in the genus Lindmania. This species is endemic to Venezuela.
