= Connellia nahoumii =

Scientific classification
- Kingdom: Plantae
- Clade: Tracheophytes
- Clade: Angiosperms
- Clade: Monocots
- Clade: Commelinids
- Order: Poales
- Family: Bromeliaceae
- Genus: Connellia
- Species: C. nahoumii

Binomial name
- Connellia nahoumii Leme

Species of flowering plant

Connellia nahoumii is a plant species in the genus Connellia. This species is endemic to Venezuela.
