= Lindmania guianensis =

Scientific classification
- Kingdom: Plantae
- Clade: Tracheophytes
- Clade: Angiosperms
- Clade: Monocots
- Clade: Commelinids
- Order: Poales
- Family: Bromeliaceae
- Genus: Lindmania
- Species: L. guianensis

Binomial name
- Lindmania guianensis (Beer) Mez

Synonyms
- Anoplophytum guianense Beer; Cottendorfia guianensis (Beer) Klotzsch ex Baker; Lindmania paludosa L.B.Sm.; Cottendorfia paludosa (L.B.Sm.) L.B.Sm.

Species of flowering plant

Lindmania guianensis is a plant species in the genus Lindmania. This species is native to Venezuela and Guyana.

Two varieties are recognized:

1. Lindmania guianensis var. guianensis - Guyana, Bolívar
2. Lindmania guianensis var. vestita (L.B.Sm.) L.B.Sm. - Venezuela
