= List of Dolichopus species =

This is a list of species in Dolichopus, a genus of long-legged flies in the family Dolichopodidae. Separate lists of synonyms are also included.

== Dolichopus species ==
This section lists 607 valid species known in Dolichopus:

- Dolichopus abaftanus Harmston, 1966^{i c g}
- Dolichopus abbreviatus Van Duzee, 1921^{i c g}
- Dolichopus aboriginis Harmston & Knowlton, 1943^{i c g}
- Dolichopus abrasus Van Duzee, 1921^{i c g}
- Dolichopus abruptus Aldrich, 1922^{i c g}
- Dolichopus absonus Van Duzee, 1921^{i c g b}
- Dolichopus accidentalis Harmston & Knowlton, 1941^{i c g}
- Dolichopus acricola Van Duzee, 1921^{i c g}
- Dolichopus acuminatus Loew, 1861^{i c g b}
- Dolichopus acutangulus Negrobov & Barkalov, 1976^{c g}
- Dolichopus acuticornis Wiedemann, 1817^{c g}
- Dolichopus acutus Van Duzee, 1921^{i c g}
- Dolichopus adaequatus Van Duzee, 1921^{i c g}
- Dolichopus adultus Van Duzee, 1921^{i c g}
- Dolichopus aequalis Van Duzee, 1921^{i c g}
- Dolichopus aeratus Van Duzee, 1921^{i c g}
- Dolichopus aethiops Van Duzee, 1921^{i c g b}
- Dolichopus affinis Walker, 1849^{i c g}
- Dolichopus affluens Van Duzee, 1921^{i c g}
- Dolichopus afroungulatus Grichanov, 2004^{c g}
- Dolichopus agilis Meigen, 1824^{c g}
- Dolichopus agronomus Melander & Brues, 1900^{i c g}
- Dolichopus ainsliei Van Duzee, 1921^{i c g}
- Dolichopus alacer Van Duzee, 1921^{i c g b}
- Dolichopus albertensis Curran, 1922^{i c g}
- Dolichopus albiciliatus Loew, 1862^{i c g b}
- Dolichopus albicinctus Smirnov, 1948^{c g}
- Dolichopus albicoxa Aldrich, 1893^{i c g b}
- Dolichopus albifrons Loew, 1859^{c g}
- Dolichopus albipalpus Negrobov, 1973^{c g}
- Dolichopus albivestitarsis Robinson, 1964^{i c g}
- Dolichopus aldrichii (Wheeler, 1899)^{i c g}
- Dolichopus alexanderi Stackelberg, 1930
- Dolichopus altayensis Yang, 1998^{c g}
- Dolichopus alticola Parent, 1930^{c g}
- Dolichopus amginensis Stackelberg, 1928^{c g}
- Dolichopus amnicola (Melander & Brues, 1900)^{i c g}
- Dolichopus amphericus Melander & Brues, 1900^{i c g}
- Dolichopus amplipennis Van Duzee, 1921^{i c g}
- Dolichopus amurensis Stackelberg, 1930^{c g}
- Dolichopus anacrostichus Frey, 1945^{c g}
- Dolichopus ancistrus Yang, 1996^{c g}
- Dolichopus andalusiacus Strobl, 1899^{g}
- Dolichopus andersoni Curran, 1924^{i c g}
- Dolichopus andorrensis Parent, 1930^{c g}
- Dolichopus angustatus Aldrich, 1893^{i c g}
- Dolichopus angusticornis Van Duzee, 1921^{i c g}
- Dolichopus angustipennis Kertesz, 1901^{c g}
- Dolichopus annulitarsis Ringdahl, 1920^{c g}
- Dolichopus apheles Melander & Brues, 1900^{i c g}
- Dolichopus apicalis Zetterstedt, 1849^{c g}
- Dolichopus appendiculatus Van Duzee, 1921^{i c g}
- Dolichopus arbustorum Stannius, 1831^{c g}
- Dolichopus argentipes Van Duzee, 1921^{i c g}
- Dolichopus argyrotarsis Wahlberg, 1850^{g}
- Dolichopus arizonicus Harmston, 1951^{i c g}
- Dolichopus armeniacus Stackelberg, 1926^{c g}
- Dolichopus armillatus Wahlberg, 1851^{c g}
- Dolichopus asiaticus Negrobov, 1973^{c g}
- Dolichopus asymmetricus Selivanova, Negrobov & Barkalov, 2012
- Dolichopus atratus Meigen, 1824^{c g}
- Dolichopus atripes Meigen, 1824^{c g}
- Dolichopus aubertini Parent, 1934^{c g}
- Dolichopus aurifacies Aldrich, 1893^{i c g}
- Dolichopus aurifex Van Duzee, 1921^{i c g b}
- Dolichopus austriacus Parent, 1927^{c g}
- Dolichopus bakeri Cole, 1912^{i c g}
- Dolichopus barbaricus Van Duzee, 1921^{i c g}
- Dolichopus barbicauda Van Duzee, 1921^{i c g}
- Dolichopus barbipes Van Duzee, 1921^{i c g}
- Dolichopus barkalovi Negrobov, Selivanova & Maslova, 2018
- Dolichopus barycnemus Coquillett, 1900^{i c g}
- Dolichopus basalis Loew, 1859^{c g}
- Dolichopus basisetus Yang, 1998^{c g}
- Dolichopus bayaticus Negrobov, 1976^{c g}
- Dolichopus beameri Harmston & Knowlton, 1941^{i c g}
- Dolichopus beatus Van Duzee, 1921^{i c g}
- Dolichopus beschovskii Negrobov & Kechev, 2010
- Dolichopus bianchii Stackelberg, 1929^{c g}
- Dolichopus bifractus Loew, 1861^{i c g b}
- Dolichopus bigeniculatus Parent, 1926^{c g}
- Dolichopus bilamellatus Parent, 1929^{c g}
- Dolichopus bisetosus Van Duzee, 1921^{i c g}
- Dolichopus bisetulatus Negrobov, 1977^{c g}
- Dolichopus blandus Van Duzee, 1921^{i c g}
- Dolichopus bolsteri Van Duzee, 1921^{i c g}
- Dolichopus bonsdorffi Frey, 1915
- Dolichopus brevicauda Van Duzee, 1921^{i c g}
- Dolichopus breviciliatus Van Duzee, 1930^{i c g}
- Dolichopus breviclypeus Negrobov, 1976^{c g}
- Dolichopus brevifacies Stackelberg, 1926^{c g}
- Dolichopus brevimanus Loew, 1861^{i c g}
- Dolichopus brevipennis Meigen, 1824^{i c g}
- Dolichopus brevipilosus Van Duzee, 1933^{i c g}
- Dolichopus breviusculus Loew, 1871^{c g}
- Dolichopus bruesi Van Duzee, 1921^{i c g}
- Dolichopus bruneifacies Van Duzee, 1933^{i c g}
- Dolichopus brunneilineatus Negrobov, 1976^{c g}
- Dolichopus brunneus Aldrich, 1893^{i c g}
- Dolichopus bryanti Van Duzee, 1921^{i c g}
- Dolichopus burnesi Van Duzee, 1921^{i c g}
- Dolichopus calainus Melander & Brues, 1900^{i c g}
- Dolichopus calcaratus Aldrich, 1893^{i c g}
- Dolichopus calceatus Parent, 1927^{c g}
- Dolichopus californicus Van Duzee, 1921^{i c g}
- Dolichopus caligatus Wahlberg, 1850^{c g}
- Dolichopus calinotus Loew, 1871^{c g}
- Dolichopus callosus Becker, 1902^{c g}
- Dolichopus calvimontis James, 1939^{i c g}
- Dolichopus campestris Meigen, 1824^{c g}
- Dolichopus canadensis Van Duzee, 1921^{i c g}
- Dolichopus canaliculatus Thomson, 1869^{i c g b}
- Dolichopus carolinensis Van Duzee, 1921^{i c g}
- Dolichopus cavatus Van Duzee, 1921^{i c g}
- Dolichopus celeripes Van Duzee, 1921^{i c g}
- Dolichopus chrysostomus Loew, 1861^{i c g}
- Dolichopus cilifemoratus Macquart, 1827^{c g}
- Dolichopus cinctipes Wahlberg, 1850^{c g}
- Dolichopus ciscaucasicus Stackelberg, 1927^{c g}
- Dolichopus claviger Stannius, 1831^{c g}
- Dolichopus clavipes Haliday, 1832^{c g}
- Dolichopus coercens Walker, 1849^{i c g}
- Dolichopus coloradensis Aldrich, 1893^{i c g}
- Dolichopus comatus Loew, 1861^{i c g b}
- Dolichopus compactus Van Duzee, 1921^{i c g}
- Dolichopus completus Van Duzee, 1921^{i c g}
- Dolichopus comptus Van Duzee, 1921^{i c g}
- Dolichopus consanguineus (Wheeler, 1899)^{i c g b}
- Dolichopus conspectus Van Duzee, 1921^{i c g}
- Dolichopus contiguus Walker, 1849^{i c g}
- Dolichopus convergens Aldrich, 1893^{i c g}
- Dolichopus coquilletti Aldrich, 1893^{i c g}
- Dolichopus corax Osten Sacken, 1877^{i c g}
- Dolichopus correus Steyskal, 1959^{i c g}
- Dolichopus costalis Frey, 1915^{c g}
- Dolichopus crassicornis Aldrich, 1922^{i c g}
- Dolichopus crassicosta Parent, 1926^{c g}
- Dolichopus crassitibia Robinson, 1967^{i c g}
- Dolichopus crenatus (Osten Sacken, 1877)^{i c g b}
- Dolichopus cuneipennis Parent, 1926^{c g}
- Dolichopus cuprinus Wiedemann, 1830^{i c g b}
- Dolichopus czekanovskii Stackelberg, 1928^{c g}
- Dolichopus dakotensis Aldrich, 1893^{i c g}
- Dolichopus dasyops Malloch, 1919^{i c g}
- Dolichopus dasypodus Coquillett, 1910^{i c g}
- Dolichopus davshinicus Negrobov, 1973^{c g}
- Dolichopus decorus Van Duzee, 1921^{i c g}
- Dolichopus defectus Van Duzee, 1921^{i c g}
- Dolichopus delicatus Aldrich, 1922^{i c g}
- Dolichopus demissus Van Duzee, 1921^{i c g}
- Dolichopus detersus Loew, 1866^{i c g}
- Dolichopus diadema Haliday, 1832^{c g}
- Dolichopus digitus Van Duzee, 1921^{i c g}
- Dolichopus discifer Stannius, 1831
- Dolichopus discimanus Wahlberg, 1850^{c g}
- Dolichopus discolor Van Duzee, 1921^{i c g}
- Dolichopus disharmonicus Smirnov, 1948^{c g}
- Dolichopus distinctus Van Duzee, 1921^{c g b}
- Dolichopus diversipennis Curran, 1922^{i c g}
- Dolichopus divigatus Harmston, 1952^{i c g}
- Dolichopus divisus Becker, 1917^{c g}
- Dolichopus dolosus Parent, 1934^{i c g}
- Dolichopus domesticus Van Duzee, 1921^{i c g b}
- Dolichopus dorsalis Van Duzee, 1921^{i c g}
- Dolichopus dorycerus Loew, 1864^{i c g}
- Dolichopus dracula Runyon, 2008^{c g}
- Dolichopus dubrovskyi Negrobov, Maslova & Selivanova, 2019
- Dolichopus duplicatus Aldrich, 1893^{i c g}
- Dolichopus efflatouni (Parent, 1925)^{c g}
- Dolichopus elegans Aldrich, 1922^{i c g}
- Dolichopus emeljanovi Stackelberg, 1930
- Dolichopus enigma Melander & Brues, 1900^{i c g}
- Dolichopus eous Stackelberg, 1929
- Dolichopus erroneus Parent, 1926^{c g}
- Dolichopus eudactylus Loew, 1861^{i c g}
- Dolichopus eurypterus Gerstaecker, 1864^{c g}
- Dolichopus evolvens Parent, 1929^{i c g}
- Dolichopus excisus Loew, 1859^{c g}
- Dolichopus exsul Aldrich, 1922^{i c g}
- Dolichopus facirecedens Harmston & Knowlton, 1939^{i c g}
- Dolichopus factivittatus Harmston, 1966^{i c g}
- Dolichopus falcatus Becker, 1917^{c g}
- Dolichopus fallax Van Duzee, 1933^{i c g}
- Dolichopus festivus Haliday, 1832^{c g}
- Dolichopus finitus Walker, 1849^{i c g}
- Dolichopus flagellitenens Wheeler, 1890^{i c g}
- Dolichopus flaviciliatus Van Duzee, 1921^{i c g}
- Dolichopus flavicoxa Van Duzee, 1921^{i c g}
- Dolichopus flavifacies Van Duzee, 1933^{i c g}
- Dolichopus flavilacertus Van Duzee, 1921^{i c g}
- Dolichopus flavipes Stannius, 1831^{c g}
- Dolichopus flavocrinitus Becker, 1902^{c g}
- Dolichopus footei Harmston, 1966^{i c g}
- Dolichopus formosus Van Duzee, 1921^{i c g}
- Dolichopus fortis Aldrich, 1922^{i c g}
- Dolichopus fraterculus Zetterstedt, 1843^{c g}
- Dolichopus fridolini Stackelberg, 1928
- Dolichopus friedrichi Meuffels & Grootaert, 1999^{c g}
- Dolichopus frontalis Van Duzee, 1928^{i c g}
- Dolichopus fucatus Van Duzee, 1921^{i c g}
- Dolichopus fulgerus Harmston, 1966^{c g}
- Dolichopus fulvipes Loew, 1862^{i c g}
- Dolichopus fumosus Van Duzee, 1921^{i c g}
- Dolichopus funditor Loew, 1861^{i c g b}
- Dolichopus fursovi Negrobov & Barkalov, 2010
- Dolichopus fuscicercus Pollet, Khaghaninia & Kazerani, 2017^{g}
- Dolichopus gaigei Steyskal, 1973^{i c g}
- Dolichopus galeatus Loew, 1871^{c g}
- Dolichopus geniculatus Stannius, 1831^{c g}
- Dolichopus genicupallidus Becker, 1889^{c g}
- Dolichopus genualis Van Duzee, 1921^{i c g}
- Dolichopus gladius Van Duzee, 1921^{i c g}
- Dolichopus gorodkovi Negrobov, 1973^{c g}
- Dolichopus grandicornis Wahlberg, 1851^{c g}
- Dolichopus grandis Aldrich, 1893^{i c g}
- Dolichopus gratiolus Steyskal, 1973^{i c g}
- Dolichopus gratus Loew, 1861^{i c g b}
- Dolichopus griseifacies Becker, 1917^{c g}
- Dolichopus griseipennis Stannius, 1831^{c g}
- Dolichopus groenlandicus Zetterstedt, 1843^{i c g}
- Dolichopus grootaerti Negrobov, Barkalov & Selivanova, 2014
- Dolichopus grunini Smirnov, 1948^{c g}
- Dolichopus gubernator Mik, 1878^{c g}
- Dolichopus harbecki Van Duzee, 1921^{i c g}
- Dolichopus hardyi Harmston, 1951^{i c g}
- Dolichopus haritonovi Negrobov, Barkalov & Selivanova, 2012
- Dolichopus hastatus Loew, 1864^{i c g}
- Dolichopus hasynensis Negrobov, Barkalov & Selivanova, 2012
- Dolichopus hejingensis Yang, 1998^{c g}
- Dolichopus helenae James, 1939^{i c g}
- Dolichopus henanus Yang, 1999^{c g}
- Dolichopus hilaris Loew, 1862^{c g}
- Dolichopus hirsutitarsis Harmston, 1952
- Dolichopus howjingleei Olejníček, 2002^{c g}
- Dolichopus humilis Van Duzee, 1921^{i c g}
- Dolichopus ibarakiensis Negrobov, Kumazawa & Tago in Negrobov, Kumazawa, Tago & Maslova, 2015
- Dolichopus idahoensis (Aldrich, 1894)^{i c g b}
- Dolichopus idoneus Van Duzee, 1921^{i c g}
- Dolichopus immaculatus Becker, 1909^{c g}
- Dolichopus imperfectus Van Duzee, 1921^{i c g}
- Dolichopus impotens Smirnov, 1948^{c g}
- Dolichopus incisuralis Loew, 1861^{i c g}
- Dolichopus incongruus Wheeler, 1890^{i c g}
- Dolichopus indianus Harmston & Knowlton, 1946^{i c g}
- Dolichopus indicus Parent, 1934^{c g}
- Dolichopus indigenus Van Duzee, 1921^{i c g}
- Dolichopus inflatus Aldrich, 1922^{i c g}
- Dolichopus integripes Parent, 1929^{i c g}
- Dolichopus intentus Melander & Brues, 1900^{i c g}
- Dolichopus interjectus Van Duzee, 1923^{i c g}
- Dolichopus intonsus Smirnov, 1948^{c g}
- Dolichopus iowaensis Harmston & Knowlton, 1939^{i c g}
- Dolichopus ivanovi Stackelberg, 1929^{c g}
- Dolichopus jacutensis Stackelberg, 1929^{c g}
- Dolichopus jakutus Selivanova & Negrobov, 2011
- Dolichopus jaquesi Harmston & Knowlton, 1939^{i c g}
- Dolichopus jaxarticus Stackelberg, 1927^{c g}
- Dolichopus jilinensis Zhang & Yang, 2008
- Dolichopus johnsoni Aldrich, 1893^{i c g}
- Dolichopus jugalis Tucker, 1911^{i c g}
- Dolichopus kansensis Aldrich, 1893^{i c g}
- Dolichopus kasakhstaniensis Negrobov, Selivanova & Maslova, 2014
- Dolichopus kechevi Grichanov, 2016
- Dolichopus kiritschenkoi Stackelberg, 1927^{c g}
- Dolichopus kjari Stackelberg, 1929^{c g}
- Dolichopus kleini Curran in Van Duzee & Curran, 1934^{i c g}
- Dolichopus korobovi Negrobov, Selivanova & Maslova, 2020
- Dolichopus kosterini Grichanov, 2017
- Dolichopus kowarzianus Stackelberg, 1928^{c g}
- Dolichopus kozlovi Negrobov, 1973^{c g}
- Dolichopus kroeberi Parent, 1929^{c g}
- Dolichopus kumakensis Maslova, Negrobov & Selivanova, 2016
- Dolichopus kumazawai Maslova, Negrobov & Fursov, 2014
- Dolichopus kurayensis Negrobov, Barkalov & Selivanova, 2011
- Dolichopus kuznetsovi Maslova, Negrobov & Selivanova, 2012
- Dolichopus kyphotus Harmston, 1966^{i c g}
- Dolichopus laciniatus Coquillett, 1910^{i c g}
- Dolichopus lairdi Olejníček, Mohsen & Ouda, 1995^{c g}
- Dolichopus lamellicornis Thomson, 1869^{c g}
- Dolichopus lamellipes Walker, 1849^{i c g}
- Dolichopus lancearius Hedstrom, 1966^{c g}
- Dolichopus laticola Verrall, 1904^{c g}
- Dolichopus laticornis Loew, 1861^{i c g}
- Dolichopus latilimbatus Macquart, 1827^{c g}
- Dolichopus latipennis Fallén, 1823^{c g}
- Dolichopus latipes (Loew, 1861)^{i c g}
- Dolichopus latronis Van Duzee, 1921^{i c g}
- Dolichopus legendrei Parent, 1930^{c g}
- Dolichopus lenensis Negrobov, Barkalov & Selivanova, 2014
- Dolichopus lepidus Staeger, 1842^{c g}
- Dolichopus leucacra James, 1939^{i c g}
- Dolichopus leucopus Smirnov, 1948^{c g}
- Dolichopus linearis Meigen, 1824^{c g}
- Dolichopus lineatocornis Zetterstedt, 1843^{c g}
- Dolichopus litoralis Van Duzee, 1921^{i c g}
- Dolichopus litorellus Zetterstedt, 1852^{c g}
- Dolichopus lobatus Loew, 1861^{i c g}
- Dolichopus lonchophorus Loew, 1873^{c g}
- Dolichopus longicornis Stannius, 1831^{i c g}
- Dolichopus longicercus Negrobov, Selivanova & Maslova, 2018
- Dolichopus longicostalis Negrobov & Barkalov, 1978^{c g}
- Dolichopus longimanus Loew, 1861^{i c g b}
- Dolichopus longipennis Loew, 1861^{i c g b}
- Dolichopus longipilosus Zhang & Yang, 2008
- Dolichopus longisetosus Negrobov, 1973
- Dolichopus longisetus Negrobov, 1977^{c g}
- Dolichopus longitarsis Stannius, 1831^{c g}
- Dolichopus longus Aldrich, 1922^{i c g}
- Dolichopus lundbecki Curran, 1923^{i c g}
- Dolichopus luoshanensis Yang & Saigusa, 2000^{c g}
- Dolichopus luteifacies Parent, 1927^{c g}
- Dolichopus luteipennis Loew, 1861^{i c g}
- Dolichopus maculicornis Verrall, 1875
- Dolichopus maculipennis Zetterstedt, 1843^{c g}
- Dolichopus maculitarsis Van Duzee, 1925^{i c g}
- Dolichopus magnantenna James, 1939^{i c g}
- Dolichopus makarovi Smirnov, 1948^{c g}
- Dolichopus malekii Grichanov, Khaghaninia & Gharajedaghi in Khaghaninia, Gharajedaghi & Grichanov, 2014
- Dolichopus manicula Van Duzee, 1921^{i c g}
- Dolichopus mannerheimi Zetterstedt, 1838^{i c g}
- Dolichopus marginatus Aldrich, 1893^{i c g}
- Dolichopus marshalli Parent, 1933^{c g}
- Dolichopus martynovi Stackelberg, 1930^{c g}
- Dolichopus mediicornis Verrall, 1875^{c g}
- Dolichopus mediovenus Negrobov, 1977^{c g}
- Dolichopus medvedevi Grichanov, 2009
- Dolichopus meigeni Loew, 1857^{c g}
- Dolichopus melanderi Van Duzee, 1921^{c g}
- Dolichopus melanocerus Loew, 1864^{i c g}
- Dolichopus melanopus Meigen, 1824^{c g}
- Dolichopus mercieri Parent, 1929^{i c g}
- Dolichopus meridionalis Yang, 1996^{c g}
- Dolichopus meyeri Yang, 1998^{c g}
- Dolichopus microstigma Stackelberg, 1930
- Dolichopus migrans Zetterstedt, 1843^{c g}
- Dolichopus miki Parent, 1938^{c g}
- Dolichopus monarchus Harmston, 1968^{i c g}
- Dolichopus mongolicus Parent, 1926^{c g}
- Dolichopus monochaetus Smirnov, 1948^{c g}
- Dolichopus monticola Van Duzee, 1921^{i c g}
- Dolichopus multisetosus Van Duzee, 1921^{i c g}
- Dolichopus myosotus Osten Sacken, 1887^{i c g}
- Dolichopus naglisi Maslova, Selivanova & Negrobov, 2011
- Dolichopus nartshukae Negrobov, Selivanova & Maslova, 2012
- Dolichopus nataliae Stackelberg, 1930^{c g}
- Dolichopus nebulosus Smirnov, 1948^{c g}
- Dolichopus negrobovi Gosseries, 1989^{c g}
- Dolichopus neomexicanus Harmston, 1951^{i c g}
- Dolichopus nepalensis Yang, Saigusa & Masunaga, 2004^{c g}
- Dolichopus nigrescens Becker, 1917^{c g}
- Dolichopus nigricauda Van Duzee, 1921^{i c g}
- Dolichopus nigricercus Negrobov, Selivanova & Maslova, 2018
- Dolichopus nigricornis Meigen, 1824^{i c g}
- Dolichopus nigricoxa Van Duzee, 1926^{i c g}
- Dolichopus nigrilineatus Van Duzee, 1925^{i c g}
- Dolichopus nigrimanus Van Duzee, 1921^{i c g}
- Dolichopus nigripes Fallén, 1823^{c g}
- Dolichopus nigropleurus Harmston, 1966^{i c g}
- Dolichopus nimbatus Parent, 1927^{c g}
- Dolichopus nitidus Fallén, 1823^{c g}
- Dolichopus nivalis Vaillant, 1973^{c g}
- Dolichopus nodipennis Van Duzee, 1921^{i c g}
- Dolichopus nomadus Harmston & Knowlton, 1942^{i c g}
- Dolichopus notatus Staeger, 1842^{c g}
- Dolichopus nubifer Van Duzee, 1921
- Dolichopus nubilus Meigen, 1824^{c g}
- Dolichopus nudus Loew, 1864^{i c g}
- Dolichopus obcordatus Aldrich, 1893^{i c g}
- Dolichopus obscuripes Stackelberg, 1926^{c g}
- Dolichopus obsoletus Van Duzee, 1921^{i c g}
- Dolichopus occidentalis Aldrich, 1893^{i c g b}
- Dolichopus oganesiani Negrobov, 1986^{c g}
- Dolichopus omnivagus Van Duzee, 1921^{i c g}
- Dolichopus opportunus Van Duzee, 1921^{i c g}
- Dolichopus oregonensis Van Duzee, 1927^{i c g}
- Dolichopus orichalceus Gosseries, 1989^{c g}
- Dolichopus orientalis Parent, 1927^{c g}
- Dolichopus ornamentarsis Negrobov & Barkalov, 2008
- Dolichopus ornatipennis Van Duzee, 1921^{i c g}
- Dolichopus ovatus Loew, 1861^{i c g b}
- Dolichopus oxianus Stackelberg, 1930^{c g}
- Dolichopus pachycnemus Loew, 1861^{i c g}
- Dolichopus packardi Van Duzee, 1921^{i c g}
- Dolichopus palaestricus Loew, 1864^{i c g}
- Dolichopus paluster Melander & Brues, 1900^{i c g}
- Dolichopus pamiricus Negrobov, 1976^{c g}
- Dolichopus pantomimus Melander & Brues, 1900^{i c g b}
- Dolichopus partitus Melander & Brues, 1900^{i c g}
- Dolichopus parvicornis Van Duzee, 1921^{i c g}
- Dolichopus parvimanus Van Duzee, 1933^{i c g}
- Dolichopus penicillatus Van Duzee, 1921^{i c g}
- Dolichopus pennatus Meigen, 1824^{c g}
- Dolichopus pensus Aldrich, 1922^{i c g}
- Dolichopus pernix Melander & Brues, 1900^{i c g}
- Dolichopus perplexus Van Duzee, 1923^{i c g}
- Dolichopus perversus Loew, 1871^{c g}
- Dolichopus phaeopus Haliday in Walker, 1851^{c g}
- Dolichopus phyllocerus Vockeroth, 1962^{i c g}
- Dolichopus picipes Meigen, 1824^{c g}
- Dolichopus pilatus Van Duzee, 1921^{i c g}
- Dolichopus pingreensis James, 1939^{i c g}
- Dolichopus planitarsis Fallén, 1823^{c g}
- Dolichopus platychaetus Negrobov & Barkalov, 1977^{c g}
- Dolichopus platylepis Negrobov & Grichanov, 1979^{c g}
- Dolichopus plumipes (Scopoli, 1763)^{i c g b}
- Dolichopus plumitarsis Fallén, 1823^{i c g}
- Dolichopus plumosus Aldrich, 1893^{i c g}
- Dolichopus polleti Meuffels & Grootaert, 1989^{c g}
- Dolichopus pollex Osten Sacken, 1877^{i c g}
- Dolichopus polychaetus Negrobov, 1973^{c g}
- Dolichopus popularis Wiedemann, 1817^{c g}
- Dolichopus porphyrops Van Duzee, 1921^{i c g b}
- Dolichopus portentosus Negrobov, 1973^{c g}
- Dolichopus pospelovi Smirnov, 1948^{c g}
- Dolichopus postocularis Negrobov, 1977^{c g}
- Dolichopus praeustus Loew, 1862^{i c g}
- Dolichopus pseudomigrans Ringdahl, 1928^{c g}
- Dolichopus ptenopedilus Meuffels, 1981^{c g}
- Dolichopus puberiseta Parent, 1934^{i c g}
- Dolichopus pugil Loew, 1866^{i c g}
- Dolichopus pulchrimanus (Bigot, 1888)^{i c g b}
- Dolichopus pullus Smirnov, 1948^{c g}
- Dolichopus punctum Meigen, 1824^{c g}
- Dolichopus pyrenaicus Parent, 1920^{c g}
- Dolichopus qinghensis Zhang, Yang & Grootaert, 2004^{c g}
- Dolichopus quadrilamellatus Loew, 1864^{i c g}
- Dolichopus ramifer Loew, 1861^{i c g b}
- Dolichopus recticosta Aldrich, 1922^{i c g}
- Dolichopus reflectus Aldrich, 1893^{i c g b}
- Dolichopus reichardti Stackelberg, 1930^{c g}
- Dolichopus remipes Wahlberg, 1839^{i c g b}
- Dolichopus remotus Walker, 1849^{i c g}
- Dolichopus remus Van Duzee, 1921^{i c g}
- Dolichopus renidescens Melander & Brues, 1900^{i c g}
- Dolichopus retinens Van Duzee, 1921^{i c g b}
- Dolichopus rezvorum Stackelberg, 1930^{c g}
- Dolichopus ringdahli Stackelberg, 1930^{c g}
- Dolichopus roborovskii Stackelberg, 1930^{c g}
- Dolichopus robustus Stackelberg, 1928^{c g}
- Dolichopus romanovi Smirnov & Negrobov, 1973^{c g}
- Dolichopus rotundipennis Loew, 1848^{c g}
- Dolichopus ruchini Negrobov, Maslova & Selivanova, 2020
- Dolichopus ruficornis Loew, 1861^{i c g}
- Dolichopus rufitinctus Becker, 1917^{c g}
- Dolichopus rupestris Haliday, 1833^{i c g}
- Dolichopus ruthei Loew, 1847^{c g}
- Dolichopus sabinus Haliday, 1838^{c g}
- Dolichopus sagittarius Loew, 1848^{c g}
- Dolichopus salictorum Loew, 1871^{c g}
- Dolichopus saphirus Becker, 1922^{c g}
- Dolichopus sarotes Loew, 1866^{i c g}
- Dolichopus satoi Negrobov, Fursov & Selivanova, 2014
- Dolichopus saxicola Smirnov, 1948^{c g}
- Dolichopus scapularis Loew, 1861^{i c g b}
- Dolichopus scopifer James, 1939^{i c g}
- Dolichopus scutopilosus Parent, 1933^{c g}
- Dolichopus sedulus Van Duzee, 1921^{i c g}
- Dolichopus segregatus Parent, 1929^{c g}
- Dolichopus selivanovae Negrobov & Barkalov, 2010
- Dolichopus serratus Van Duzee, 1921^{i c g}
- Dolichopus setifer Loew, 1861^{i c g b}
- Dolichopus setiger Negrobov, 1973^{c g}
- Dolichopus setimanus Smirnov, 1948^{c g}
- Dolichopus setitarsus Negrobov & Barkalov, 1977
- Dolichopus setosus Loew, 1862^{i c g}
- Dolichopus sexarticulatus Loew, 1864^{i c g b}
- Dolichopus shamshevi Negrobov, Selivanova & Maslova, 2014
- Dolichopus shantaricus Stackelberg, 1933^{c g}
- Dolichopus sharovi Smirnov, 1948^{c g}
- Dolichopus shastaensis Harmston, 1966^{i c g}
- Dolichopus shelfordi Curran in Van Duzee & Curran, 1934^{i c g}
- Dolichopus shii Yang, 1996^{c g}
- Dolichopus sibiricus Stackelberg, 1929^{c g}
- Dolichopus sicardi Parent, 1920^{c g}
- Dolichopus sicarius Van Duzee, 1921^{i c g b}
- Dolichopus siculus Loew, 1859^{c g}
- Dolichopus sidorenkoi Negrobov, Maslova & Selivanova, 2011
- Dolichopus signatus Meigen, 1824^{c g}
- Dolichopus signifer Haliday, 1838^{c g}
- Dolichopus silvicola Harmston, 1951^{i c g}
- Dolichopus simillimus Parent, 1933^{c g}
- Dolichopus simius Parent, 1927^{c g}
- Dolichopus simplex Meigen, 1824^{c g}
- Dolichopus simplicipes Aldrich, 1922^{i c g}
- Dolichopus simulans Van Duzee, 1926^{i c g}
- Dolichopus simulator Parent, 1926^{c g}
- Dolichopus sincerus Melander, 1900^{i c g b}
- Dolichopus sinualaris Harmston, 1966^{i c g}
- Dolichopus sinuatus Negrobov & Barkalov, 1978^{c g}
- Dolichopus skifiensis Negrobov, Selivanova & Maslova, 2013
- Dolichopus slossonae Van Duzee, 1921^{i c g}
- Dolichopus smirnovianus Negrobov, 1977^{c g}
- Dolichopus smithae Harmston, 1966^{i c g}
- Dolichopus socer Loew, 1871^{c g}
- Dolichopus socius Loew, 1862^{i c g}
- Dolichopus soldatovi Negrobov, Selivanova & Maslova in Negrobov, Maslova & Selivanova, 2013
- Dolichopus solidus Van Duzee, 1921^{i c g}
- Dolichopus sordidatus Van Duzee, 1921^{i c g}
- Dolichopus speciosus Van Duzee, 1921^{i c g}
- Dolichopus sphaeristes Brues, 1901^{i c g}
- Dolichopus sphagnatilis Vaillant in Vaillant & Brunhes, 1980^{c g}
- Dolichopus spinuliformis Maslova, Negrobov & Selivanova, 2012
- Dolichopus sporadicus Harmston & Knowlton, 1942^{i c g}
- Dolichopus squamicilliatus Harmston, 1966^{i c g}
- Dolichopus squamosus Van Duzee, 1921^{i c g}
- Dolichopus stackelbergi Smirnov, 1948^{c g}
- Dolichopus steini Becker, 1917^{c g}
- Dolichopus stenhammari Zetterstedt, 1843^{i c g}
- Dolichopus steyskali Robinson, 1964^{i c g}
- Dolichopus storozhenkoi Negrobov, Selivanova & Maslova, 2016
- Dolichopus stricklandi Harmston & Knowlton, 1939^{i c g}
- Dolichopus strigipes Verrall, 1875^{c g}
- Dolichopus subapicalis Yang, 1998^{c g}
- Dolichopus subciliatus Loew, 1864^{i c g}
- Dolichopus subcostatus Van Duzee, 1930^{i c g}
- Dolichopus sublimbatus Becker, 1917^{c g}
- Dolichopus subpennatus d'Assis-Fonseca, 1976^{c g}
- Dolichopus subspina Van Duzee, 1928^{i c g}
- Dolichopus subspretus Negrobov, 1979^{c g}
- Dolichopus sufflavus Van Duzee, 1921^{i c g}
- Dolichopus superbus Van Duzee, 1921^{i c g b}
- Dolichopus sychevskajae Negrobov & Barkalov, 1978^{c g}
- Dolichopus syracusanus Becker, 1917^{c g}
- Dolichopus syriacus Becker, 1917^{c g}
- Dolichopus taigensis Smirnov, 1948^{c g}
- Dolichopus taimyricus Selivanova, Negrobov & Barkalov, 2012
- Dolichopus talus Van Duzee, 1921^{i c g}
- Dolichopus tanythrix Loew, 1869^{c g}
- Dolichopus tarsipictis Harmston & Knowlton, 1963^{i c g}
- Dolichopus tener Loew, 1861^{i c g}
- Dolichopus tenuicornis (Parent, 1927)^{c g}
- Dolichopus tenuimanus Van Duzee, 1932^{i c g}
- Dolichopus tenuipes Aldrich, 1894^{i c g b}
- Dolichopus terminalis Loew, 1866^{i c g}
- Dolichopus terminasianae Negrobov, Selivanova & Maslova, 2011
- Dolichopus tetricus Loew, 1864^{i c g}
- Dolichopus tewoensis Yang, 1998^{c g}
- Dolichopus theodori Meuffels & Grootaert, 1999^{c g}
- Dolichopus tokyoensis Negrobov, Kumazawa & Tago in Negrobov, Kumazawa, Tago & Maslova, 2015
- Dolichopus tonsus Loew, 1861^{i c g}
- Dolichopus townsendi Aldrich, 1922^{i c g}
- Dolichopus triangularis Smirnov, 1948^{c g}
- Dolichopus trisetosus Van Duzee, 1921^{i c g}
- Dolichopus trivialis Haliday, 1832^{c g}
- Dolichopus tschernovi Negrobov, Barkalov & Selivanova, 2014
- Dolichopus tumefactus Negrobov, 1973^{c g}
- Dolichopus tumicosta Negrobov, Grichanov & Barkalov, 2009^{g}
- Dolichopus tundrensis Barkalov, Negrobov & Grichanov, 2009^{g}
- Dolichopus turanicus Stackelberg, 1930^{c g}
- Dolichopus turkestani Becker, 1917^{c g}
- Dolichopus ukokensis Negrobov & Barkalov, 2009
- Dolichopus ulaganensis Negrobov, Barkalov & Maslova, 2019
- Dolichopus uliginosus Van Duzee, 1923^{i c g}
- Dolichopus umbrosus Van Duzee, 1921^{i c g}
- Dolichopus ungulatus (Linnaeus, 1758)^{i c g}
- Dolichopus uniseta Stackelberg, 1929^{c g}
- Dolichopus uralensis Stackelberg, 1930^{c g}
- Dolichopus urbanus Meigen, 1824^{c g}
- Dolichopus ussuriensis Stackelberg, 1930^{c g}
- Dolichopus utahensis Harmston & Knowlton, 1943^{i c g}
- Dolichopus uxorcula Van Duzee, 1921^{i c g}
- Dolichopus vadimi Negrobov, Selivanova & Maslova, 2012
- Dolichopus vadimiani Negrobov & Barkalov, 1978^{c g}
- Dolichopus vaillanti Parent, 1927^{c g}
- Dolichopus vanduzeei Curran, 1922^{i c g}
- Dolichopus variabilis Loew, 1861^{i c g b}
- Dolichopus varians Smirnov, 1948^{c g}
- Dolichopus varipes Coquillett, 1900^{i c g}
- Dolichopus vegetus Harmston, 1952^{i c g}
- Dolichopus venturii Negrobov, Selivanova & Maslova, 2014
- Dolichopus verae Negrobov, 1977^{c g}
- Dolichopus vernaae Harmston & Knowlton, 1940^{i c g}
- Dolichopus versutus Van Duzee, 1921^{i c g}
- Dolichopus vicfursovi Negrobov, Kumazawa & Tago in Negrobov, Kumazawa, Tago & Maslova, 2015
- Dolichopus victoris Stackelberg, 1933^{c g}
- Dolichopus vigilans Aldrich, 1893^{i c g b}
- Dolichopus violovitshi Negrobov, 1977^{c g}
- Dolichopus virga Coquillett, 1910^{i c g}
- Dolichopus virginiensis Van Duzee, 1921^{i c g}
- Dolichopus virgultorum Haliday in Walker, 1851^{c g}
- Dolichopus viridis Van Duzee, 1921^{i c g}
- Dolichopus vitripennis Meigen, 1824^{c g}
- Dolichopus wahlbergi Zetterstedt, 1843^{c g}
- Dolichopus walkeri Van Duzee, 1921^{i c g}
- Dolichopus wheelerii (Melander & Brues, 1900)^{i c g}
- Dolichopus xanthocnemus Loew, 1864^{i c g}
- Dolichopus xanthopyga Stackelberg, 1930^{c g}
- Dolichopus xinjianganus Yang, 1998
- Dolichopus xinyuanus Yang, 1998
- Dolichopus yangi Zhang & Yang, 2008
- Dolichopus yunnanus Parent, 1930^{c g}
- Dolichopus zaitzevi Grichanov, 2012
- Dolichopus zakhvatkini Maslova, Selivanova & Negrobov, 2011
- Dolichopus zernyi Parent, 1927^{c g}
- Dolichopus zetterstedti Stenhammar, 1851^{c g}
- Dolichopus zhejiangensis Yang & Li, 1998^{c g}
- Dolichopus zhelochovzevi Negrobov, 1976^{c g}
- Dolichopus zhongdianus Yang, 1998^{c g}
- Dolichopus zhoui Zhang, Yang & Grootaert, 2004^{c g}
- Dolichopus zimini Stackelberg, 1930^{c g}
- Dolichopus zlobini Selivanova, Negrobov & Barkalov, 2012
- Dolichopus zurikovi Negrobov, Selivanova & Maslova, 2012
- Dolichopus zygomus Harmston, 1966^{i c g}
- †Dolichopus georgi Meuffels & Grootaert, 1999
- †Dolichopus miluus Forster, 1891
- †Dolichopus scitus Statz, 1940
- †Dolichopus spinosus Statz, 1940

Unrecognised species:

- Dolichopus adjacens (Walker, 1849)^{c g}
- Dolichopus alpinus Meigen, 1824
- Dolichopus analis Macquart, 1834
- Dolichopus bicolor Macquart, 1827
- Dolichopus collinus Philippi, 1865
- Dolichopus concolor Philippi, 1865
- Dolichopus confinis Walker, 1849^{i c g}
- Dolichopus contingens Walker, 1852
- Dolichopus crisatus (Fabricius, 1794)
- Dolichopus discessus Walker, 1849^{i c g}
- Dolichopus distractus Walker, 1849^{i c g}
- Dolichopus dubiosus Philippi, 1865
- Dolichopus exclusus Walker, 1849^{i c g}
- Dolichopus flavifrons Philippi, 1865 (acalyptrate?)
- Dolichopus fuscipennis Wiedemann, 1824^{c g} (subfamily Sciapodinae)
- Dolichopus heydeni Wiedemann, 1830
- Dolichopus inornatus Philippi, 1865 (acalyptrate?)
- Dolichopus longicollis Meigen, 1824
- Dolichopus longipes Philippi, 1865 (Sympycnus?)
- Dolichopus misellus Boheman, 1853
- Dolichopus nigripes (Fabricius, 1794) (Chrysotus laesus (Wiedemann, 1817)?)
- Dolichopus nitens (Fabricius, 1805)^{c g} (subfamily Sciapodinae)
- Dolichopus parvus Macquart, 1834
- Dolichopus plebeius Meigen, 1824 (Dolichopus linearis Meigen, 1824?)
- Dolichopus praemissus Walker, 1859^{c}
- Dolichopus pulcher Walker, 1852^{i c g}
- Dolichopus punctiger Philippi, 1865 (Tachytrechus?)
- Dolichopus separatus Walker, 1849^{i c g}
- Dolichopus soccatus Walker, 1849^{i c g}
- Dolichopus sublamellatus Macquart, 1827
- Dolichopus terminatus Walker, 1849^{i c g}

The following species are unplaced in the family Dolichopodidae:

- †Dolichopus titanus (Meunier, 1907)

Data sources: i = ITIS, c = Catalogue of Life, g = GBIF, b = Bugguide.net

== Synonyms ==
The following species are synonyms:

- Dolichopus aemulus Loew, 1859^{c g}: synonym of Dolichopus popularis Wiedemann, 1817
- Dolichopus afflictus (Osten Sacken, 1877)^{c g}: synonym of Dolichopus lamellicornis (Thomson, 1869)
- Dolichopus alberecrus Gunther, 1982^{i c g}: synonym of Dolichopus scapularis Loew, 1861
- Dolichopus angustinervis Becker, 1922^{c g}: synonym of Dolichopus exsul Aldrich, 1922
- Dolichopus annaclareii Gunther, 1982^{i c g}: synonym of Dolichopus variabilis Loew, 1861
- Dolichopus annulipes Zetterstedt, 1838: synonym of Dolichopus stenhammari Zetterstedt, 1843
- Dolichopus atritibialis Zetterstedt, 1859^{c g}: synonym of Dolichopus urbanus Meigen, 1824
- Dolichopus balius Meuffels, 1982^{c g}: synonym of Dolichopus nimbatus Parent, 1927
- Dolichopus brachyurus Zetterstedt, 1859: synonym of Dolichopus fraterculus Zetterstedt, 1843
- Dolichopus consimilis Wahlberg, 1850^{c g}: synonym of Dolichopus picipes Meigen, 1824
- Dolichopus cruralis Wahlberg, 1850^{c g}: synonym of Dolichopus lepidus Staeger, 1842
- Dolichopus exiguus Zetterstedt, 1843: synonym of Dolichopus arbustorum Stannius, 1831
- Dolichopus frosti Runyon, 2008^{c g}: synonym of Dolichopus sincerus Melander, 1900
- Dolichopus fulgidus Fallén, 1823: synonym of Dolichopus campestris Meigen, 1824
- Dolichopus gracilis Aldrich, 1893^{c g}: synonym of Dolichopus variabilis Loew, 1861
- Dolichopus hurleyi Runyon, 2008^{c g}: synonym of Dolichopus dorycerus Loew, 1864
- Dolichopus inconspicuus Zetterstedt, 1843: synonym of Dolichopus simplex Meigen, 1824
- Dolichopus lantsovi Negrobov, Grichanov & Barkalov, 2009^{g}: synonym of Dolichopus humilis Van Duzee, 1921
- Dolichopus lapponicus Becker, 1917: synonym of Dolichopus lepidus Staeger, 1842
- Dolichopus luteitarsis Parent, 1932^{c g}: synonym of Dolichopus flavocrinitus Becker, 1902
- Dolichopus micropygus Wahlberg, 1850^{i c g}: synonym of Dolichopus fraterculus Zetterstedt, 1843
- Dolichopus modestus Wahlberg, 1850^{c g}: synonym of Dolichopus simplex Meigen, 1824
- Dolichopus mucronatus Becker, 1917^{c g}: synonym of Dolichopus discimanus Wahlberg, 1850
- Dolichopus occultus Becker, 1917^{c g}: synonym of Dolichopus arbustorum Stannius, 1831
- Dolichopus pallidus Negrobov, 1991^{c g} (preoccupied by Dolichopus pallidus Fallén, 1823): synonym of Dolichopus negrobovi Gosseries, 1989
- Dolichopus parvicaudatus Zetterstedt, 1843^{c g}: synonym of Dolichopus plumipes (Scopoli, 1763)
- Dolichopus pectinitarsis Stenhammar, 1851^{c g}: synonym of Dolichopus plumipes (Scopoli, 1763)
- Dolichopus propinquus Zetterstedt, 1852^{c g}: synonym of Dolichopus trivialis Haliday, 1832
- Dolichopus spretus Loew, 1871^{c g}: synonym of Dolichopus vitripennis Meigen, 1824
- Dolichopus subimmaculatus Kazerani, Pollet & Khaghaninia, 2017^{g}: synonym of Dolichopus perversus Loew, 1871
- Dolichopus thalhammeri Knezy, 1929^{g}: synonym of Dolichopus nimbatus Parent, 1927

The following species were renamed:

- Dolichopus agilis Aldrich, 1893 (preoccupied by Dolichopus agilis Meigen, 1824): renamed to Dolichopus coloradensis Aldrich, 1893
- Dolichopus breviciliatus Van Duzee, 1933 (preoccupied by Dolichopus breviciliatus Van Duzee, 1930): renamed to Dolichopus brevipilosus Van Duzee, 1933
- Dolichopus ciliatus (Aldrich, 1893) (preoccupied by Dolichopus ciliatus Walker, 1849 [= Dolichopus plumipes (Scopoli, 1763)]): renamed to Dolichopus penicillatus Van Duzee, 1921
- Dolichopus consobrinus Zetterstedt, 1859^{c g} (preoccupied by Dolichopus consobrinus Haliday, 1851): renamed to Dolichopus maculicornis Verrall, 1875
- Dolichopus cupreus Say, 1823 (preoccupied by Dolichopus cupreus Fallén, 1823): renamed to Dolichopus cuprinus Wiedemann, 1830
- Dolichopus migrans Becker, 1917 (preoccupied by Dolichopus migrans Zetterstedt, 1843): renamed to Dolichopus pseudomigrans Ringdahl, 1928
- Dolichopus misellus Melander, 1900 (preoccupied by Dolichopus misellus Boheman, 1853): renamed to Dolichopus perplexus Van Duzee, 1923
- Dolichopus nigrilamellatus Becker, 1917^{c g} (preoccupied by Dolichopus nigrilamellatus Macquart, 1827): renamed to Dolichopus theodori Meuffels & Grootaert, 1999
- Dolichopus nitens Stannius, 1831 (preoccupied by Dolichopus nitens Fabricius, 1805): renamed to Dolichopus friedrichi Meuffels & Grootaert, 1999
- Dolichopus pallipes Negrobov, 1973 (preoccupied by Dolichopus pallipes Macquart, 1827): renamed to Dolichopus negrobovi Gosseries, 1989
- Dolichopus propinquus (Melander & Brues, 1900) (preoccupied by Dolichopus propinquus Zetterstedt, 1852 [= Dolichopus trivialis Haliday, 1832]): renamed to Dolichopus bruesi Van Duzee, 1921
- Dolichopus thalassinus Mik, 1880 (preoccupied by Dolichopus thalassinus Haliday, 1832): renamed to Dolichopus miki Parent, 1938
- Dolichopus turkestani Stackelberg, 1927 (preoccupied by Dolichopus turkestani Becker, 1917): renamed to Dolichopus turanicus Stackelberg, 1930
- Dolichopus vittatus Loew, 1861^{i c g} (preoccupied by Dolichopus vittatus Wiedemann, 1819): renamed to Dolichopus orichalceus Gosseries, 1989

The following species were transferred to another genus:

- Dolichopus diaphanus Fabricius, 1805: transferred to Argyra (as unrecognised species)
- Dolichopus ultimus (Parent, 1935)^{c g}: transferred to Hercostomus
- †Dolichopus morbosus Meunier, 1907 transferred to Prohercostomus
- †Dolichopus minutus (Meunier, 1907) (= Dolichopus smicrus Meuffels & Grootaert, 1999): transferred to Prohercostomus

The following species are placed in Lichtwardtia, but may be considered valid if Lichtwardtia is a synonym of Dolichopus (as in Scott E. Brooks (2005)):

- Dolichopus aethiopicus (Bezzi, 1906)^{c g}
- Dolichopus aldabrensis (Meuffels & Grootaert, 2007)^{c g}
- Dolichopus angularis Macquart, 1842^{c g}
- Dolichopus angulicornis (Grichanov, 2004)^{c g}
- Dolichopus clypeatus (Grichanov, 2004)^{c g}
- Dolichopus dentalis (Zhang, Masunaga & Yang, 2009)^{c}
- Dolichopus emelyanovi (Grichanov, 1998)^{c g}
- Dolichopus formosana (Enderlein, 1912)
- Dolichopus fractinervis (Parent, 1929)^{c g}
- Dolichopus hilgerae (Grichanov, 2004)^{c g}
- Dolichopus hirsutisetus (De Meijere, 1916)
- Dolichopus hollisi (Grichanov, 1998)^{c g}
- Dolichopus maculatus (Parent, 1936)^{c g}
- Dolichopus melanesiana Bickel, 2008^{g}
- Dolichopus minusculus (Parent, 1934)^{c}
- Dolichopus mironovi (Grichanov, 1998)^{c}
- Dolichopus nigrifacies (Grichanov, 2004)^{c g}
- Dolichopus nigrotorquatus (Parent, 1937)^{c g}
- Dolichopus nikolaevae (Grichanov, 1998)^{c g}
- Dolichopus sukharevae (Grichanov, 1998)^{c g}
- Dolichopus tikhonovi (Grichanov, 1998)^{c g}
- Dolichopus ziczac Wiedemann, 1824^{c g}

If Lichtwardtia is a synonym of Dolichopus, then the following combinations would be synonyms of the species listed above:

- Dolichopus antennatus (Vanschuytbroeck, 1951)^{c g}: synonym of Dolichopus angularis (Macquart, 1842)
- Dolichopus kivuensis (Vanschuytbroeck, 1951)^{c g}: synonym of Dolichopus fractinervis (Parent, 1929)
- Dolichopus metallica (Bezzi, 1908)^{c g}: synonym of Dolichopus angularis (Macquart, 1842)
- Dolichopus violaceus (Curran, 1926)^{c g}: synonym of Dolichopus angularis (Macquart, 1842)
- Dolichopus wittei (Vanschuytbroeck, 1951)^{c}: synonym of Dolichopus maculatus (Parent, 1936)

Data sources: i = ITIS, c = Catalogue of Life, g = GBIF, b = Bugguide.net

== Miscellaneous ==
The following are listed on online data sources, but are actually subspecies or varieties of other species:

- Dolichopus clarior Parent, 1936^{c g}: Subspecies of Dolichopus simulator Parent, 1926
- Dolichopus cognatus (Melander & Brues, 1900)^{c g}: Variety of Dolichopus latipes (Loew, 1861)
- Dolichopus fusiformis Becker, 1917: Subspecies of Dolichopus clavipes Haliday, 1832
- Dolichopus nigrifemur Stackelberg, 1930^{c g}: Variety of Dolichopus fraterculus Zetterstedt, 1843
- Dolichopus robertsoni Curran, 1923^{c g}: Variety of Dolichopus amnicola (Melander & Brues, 1900)
- Dolichopus subdirectus Van Duzee, 1921^{c g}: Variety of Dolichopus sincerus Melander, 1900

The following are listed on online data sources, but are actually misspellings of other species (including synonyms):

- Dolichopus affictus (Osten Sacken, 1877)^{i g}: Actually Dolichopus afflictus
- Dolichopus alexandri Stackelberg, 1930^{c g}: Actually Dolichopus alexanderi
- Dolichopus andulusiacus Strobl, 1899^{c g}: Actually Dolichopus andalusiacus
- Dolichopus argyrotarsus Wahlberg, 1851^{c g}: Actually Dolichopus argyrotarsis
- Dolichopus bonsdorfii Frey, 1915^{c g}: Actually Dolichopus bonsdorffi
- Dolichopus czekanowskii Stackelberg, 1928^{i c g}: Actually Dolichopus czekanovskii
- Dolichopus emelijanovi Stackelberg, 1930^{c}: Actually Dolichopus emeljanovi
- Dolichopus frifolini Stackelberg, 1928^{c g}: Actually Dolichopus fridolini
- Dolichopus hirstitarsis Harmston, 1952^{i c g}: Actually Dolichopus hirsutitarsis
- Dolichopus hirsutisetis (De Meijere, 1916)^{c g}: Actually Dolichopus hirsutisetus
- Dolichopus howjingleci Olejníček, 2002^{g}: Actually Dolichopus howjingleei
- Dolichopus longicotalis Negrobov & Barkalov, 1978^{c g}: Actually Dolichopus longicostalis
- Dolichopus marcrostigma Stackelberg, 1930^{c g}: Actually Dolichopus microstigma
- Dolichopus nigriscens Becker, 1917^{g}: Actually Dolichopus nigrescens
- Dolichopus nubier Van Duzee, 1921^{i g}: Actually Dolichopus nubifer
- Dolichopus setitarsis Negrobov & Barkalov, 1977^{c g}: Actually Dolichopus setitarsus

Data sources: i = ITIS, c = Catalogue of Life, g = GBIF, b = Bugguide.net
