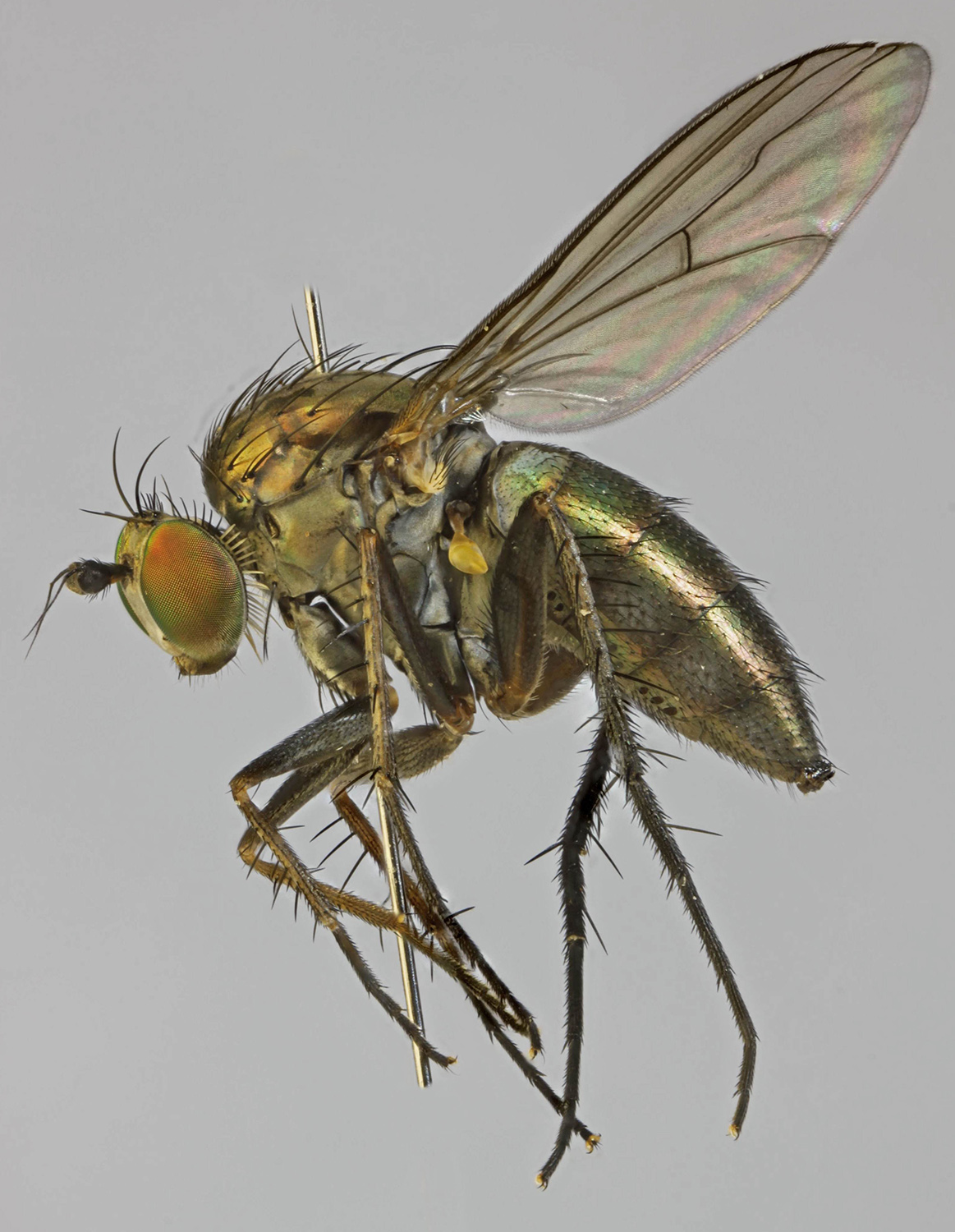
- Dolichopus clavipes North Wales

Scientific classification
- Kingdom: Animalia
- Phylum: Arthropoda
- Clade: Pancrustacea
- Class: Insecta
- Order: Diptera
- Family: Dolichopodidae
- Genus: Dolichopus
- Species: D. clavipes

Binomial name
- Dolichopus clavipes Haliday, 1832

Synonyms
- Dolichopus fuscipes Haliday, 1832; Dolichopus trochanteratus Zetterstedt, 1843; Dolichopus vitripennis Meigen, 1824 sensu Stæger, 1842

= Dolichopus clavipes =

Species of fly

Dolichopus clavipes is a species of fly in the family Dolichopodidae. It is found in the Palearctic.

== Subspecies ==
There are two subspecies of D. clavipes:

- D. clavipes clavipes Haliday, 1832
- D. clavipes fusiformis Becker, 1917 (formerly an independent species)
