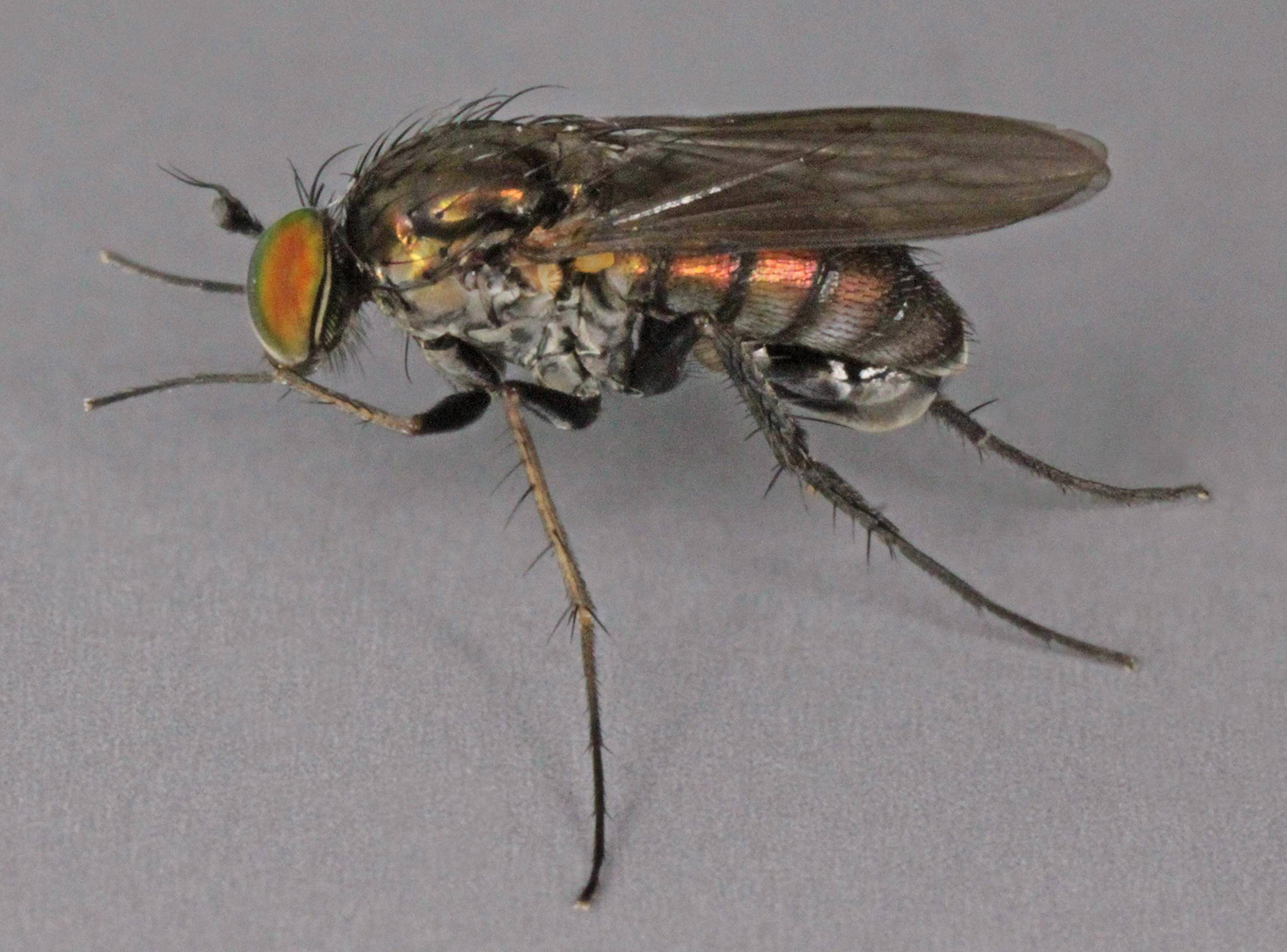
- Dolichopus lepidus North Wales

Scientific classification
- Kingdom: Animalia
- Phylum: Arthropoda
- Clade: Pancrustacea
- Class: Insecta
- Order: Diptera
- Family: Dolichopodidae
- Genus: Dolichopus
- Species: D. lepidus

Binomial name
- Dolichopus lepidus Stæger, 1842

Synonyms
- Dolichopus tibialis Zetterstedt, 1838 (nomen oblitum); Dolichopus geniculatus sensu Zetterstedt, 1843 nec Stannius, 1831; Dolichopus dissimilipes Zetterstedt, 1843; Dolichopus cruralis Wahlberg, 1850; Dolichopus picipes sensu Haliday, 1851 nec Meigen, 1824; Dolichopus lapponicus Becker, 1917; Dolichopus uliginosus Becker, 1925 (nec Van Duzee, 1923); Dolichopus uliginosulus Dyte, 1980

= Dolichopus lepidus =

Species of fly

Dolichopus lepidus is a species of fly in the family Dolichopodidae. It is found in the Palearctic.

The name Dolichopus lepidus was declared a nomen protectum, so it has precedence over the senior synonym Dolichopus tibialis (a nomen oblitum).

Dolichopus microstigma Stackelberg, 1930 was originally described as a variation of D. lepidus, and was later considered a subspecies of the species, but it is now considered a separate species.
