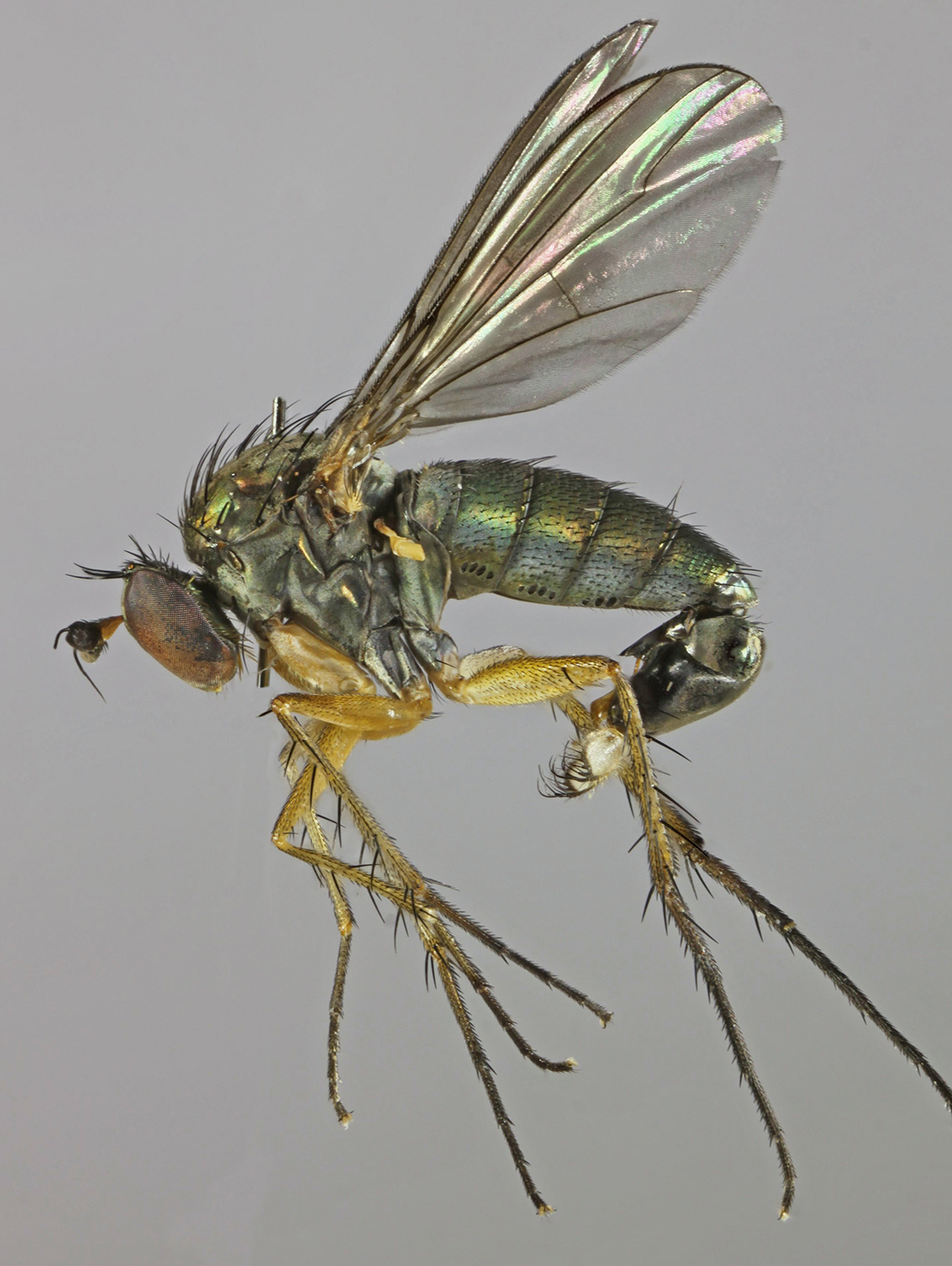
- Dolichopus simplex North Wales

Scientific classification
- Kingdom: Animalia
- Phylum: Arthropoda
- Clade: Pancrustacea
- Class: Insecta
- Order: Diptera
- Family: Dolichopodidae
- Genus: Dolichopus
- Species: D. simplex

Binomial name
- Dolichopus simplex Meigen, 1824

Synonyms
- Dolichopus inconspicuus Zetterstedt, 1843; Dolichopus modestus Wahlberg, 1850; Dolichopus thalassinus Haliday, 1832

= Dolichopus simplex =

Species of fly

Dolichopus simplex is a species of fly in the family Dolichopodidae. It is found in the Palearctic.
