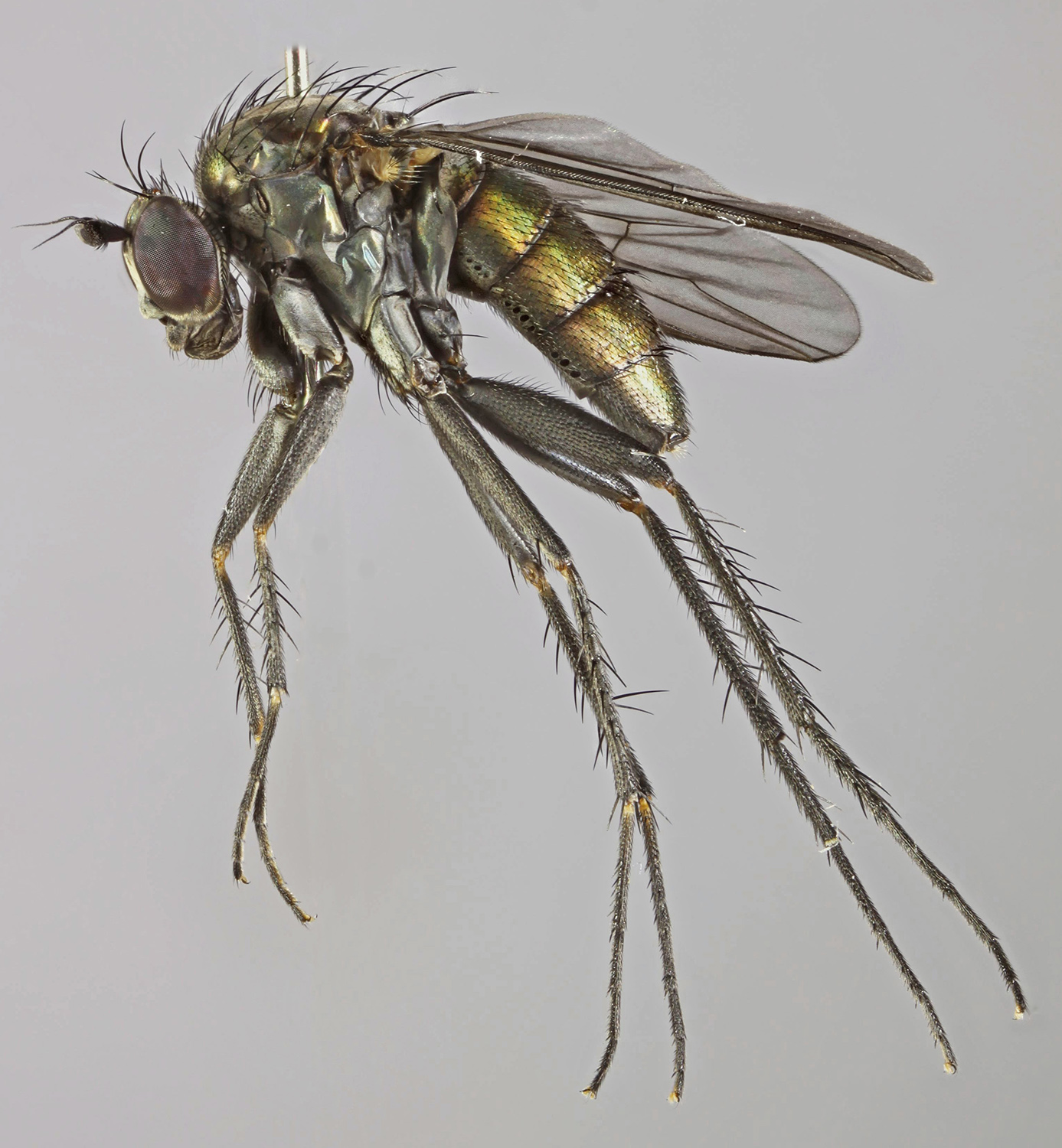
- Dolichopus picipes North Wales

Scientific classification
- Kingdom: Animalia
- Phylum: Arthropoda
- Clade: Pancrustacea
- Class: Insecta
- Order: Diptera
- Family: Dolichopodidae
- Genus: Dolichopus
- Species: D. picipes

Binomial name
- Dolichopus picipes Meigen, 1824

Synonyms
- Dolichopus cyaneus Meigen, 1824; Dolichopus consimilis Wahlberg, 1850; Dolichopus fastuosus Haliday, 1832

= Dolichopus picipes =

Species of fly

Dolichopus picipes is a species of fly in the family Dolichopodidae. It is found in the Palearctic.
