= Dolichopus remipes =

Scientific classification
- Kingdom: Animalia
- Phylum: Arthropoda
- Clade: Pancrustacea
- Class: Insecta
- Order: Diptera
- Family: Dolichopodidae
- Genus: Dolichopus
- Species: D. remipes

Binomial name
- Dolichopus remipes Wahlberg, 1839

Species of fly

Dolichopus remipes is a species of long-legged fly in the family Dolichopodidae. It is found in Europe.
