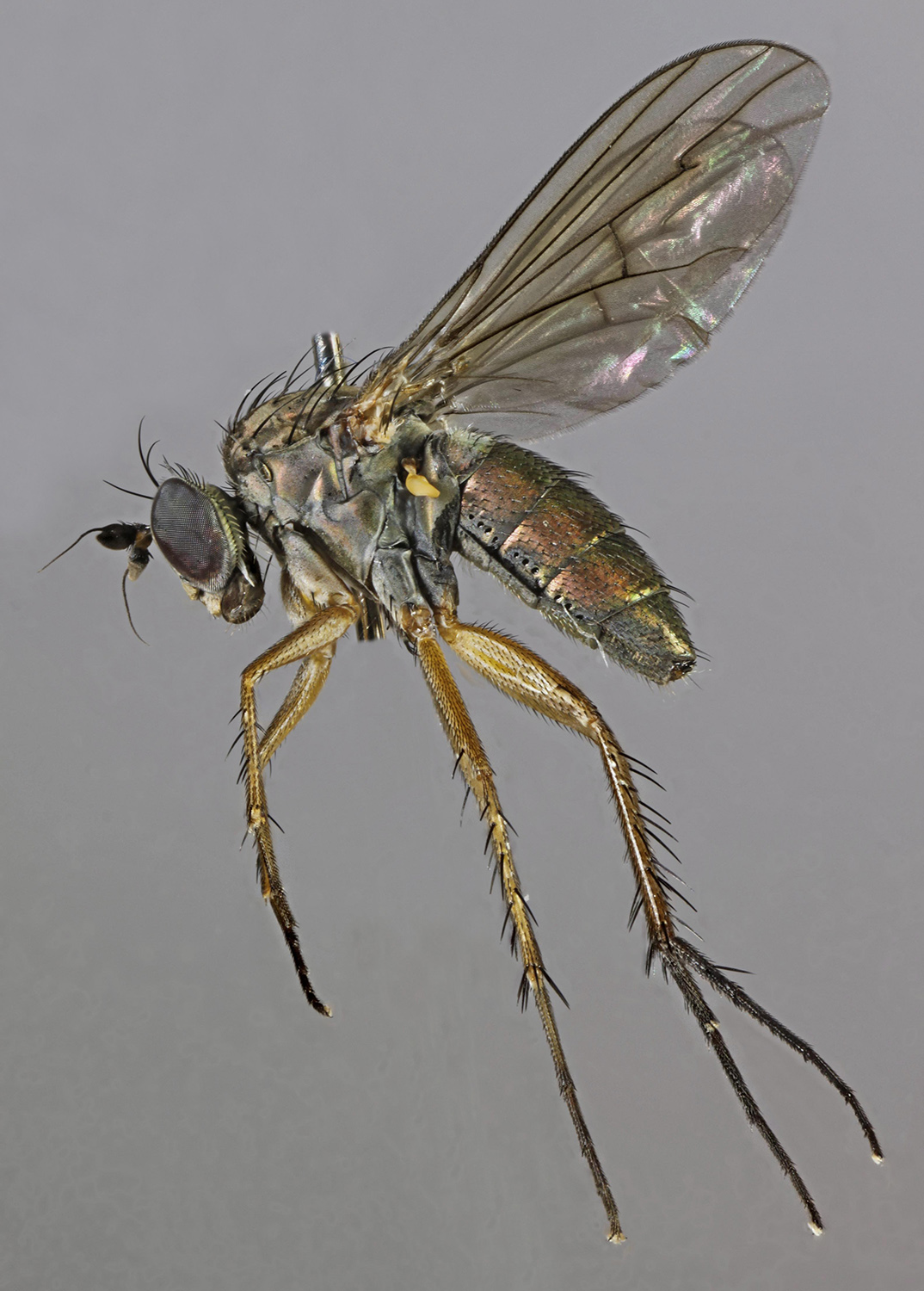
- Dolichopus griseipennis North Wales

Scientific classification
- Kingdom: Animalia
- Phylum: Arthropoda
- Clade: Pancrustacea
- Class: Insecta
- Order: Diptera
- Family: Dolichopodidae
- Genus: Dolichopus
- Species: D. griseipennis

Binomial name
- Dolichopus griseipennis Stannius, 1831

Synonyms
- Dolichopus nitidus Haliday, 1832

= Dolichopus griseipennis =

Species of fly

Dolichopus griseipennis is a species of fly in the family Dolichopodidae. It is found in the Palearctic.
