= Dolichopus albiciliatus =

Scientific classification
- Kingdom: Animalia
- Phylum: Arthropoda
- Clade: Pancrustacea
- Class: Insecta
- Order: Diptera
- Family: Dolichopodidae
- Genus: Dolichopus
- Species: D. albiciliatus

Binomial name
- Dolichopus albiciliatus Loew, 1862

Species of fly

Dolichopus albiciliatus is a species of long-legged fly in the family Dolichopodidae.
