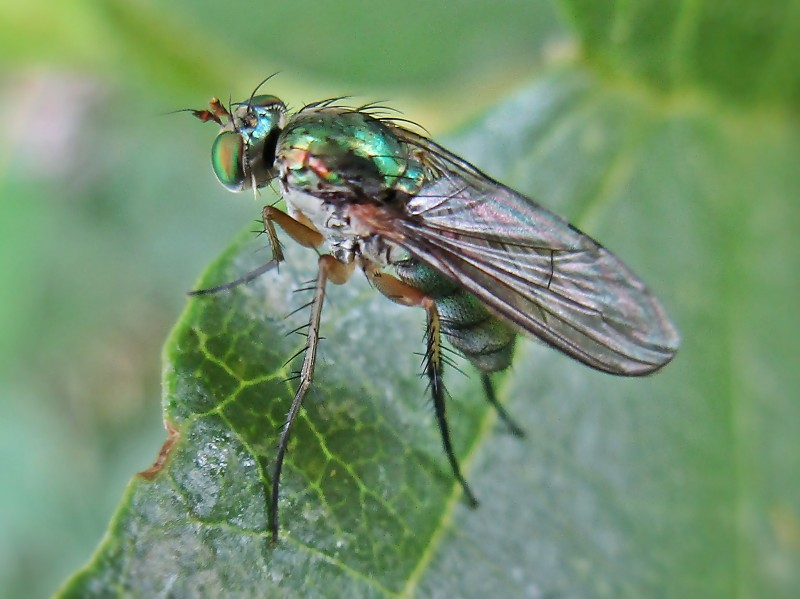

Scientific classification
- Kingdom: Animalia
- Phylum: Arthropoda
- Clade: Pancrustacea
- Class: Insecta
- Order: Diptera
- Family: Dolichopodidae
- Genus: Dolichopus
- Species: D. festivus

Binomial name
- Dolichopus festivus Haliday, 1832

Synonyms
- Dolichopus macquarti Stæger, 1842

= Dolichopus festivus =

Species of fly

Dolichopus festivus is a species of long-legged fly in the family Dolichopodidae. It is native to Europe, though it has also been recorded from Ivory Coast in Africa.
