= Dolichopus longimanus =

Scientific classification
- Kingdom: Animalia
- Phylum: Arthropoda
- Clade: Pancrustacea
- Class: Insecta
- Order: Diptera
- Family: Dolichopodidae
- Genus: Dolichopus
- Species: D. longimanus

Binomial name
- Dolichopus longimanus Loew, 1861

Species of fly

Dolichopus longimanus is a species of long-legged fly in the family Dolichopodidae.
