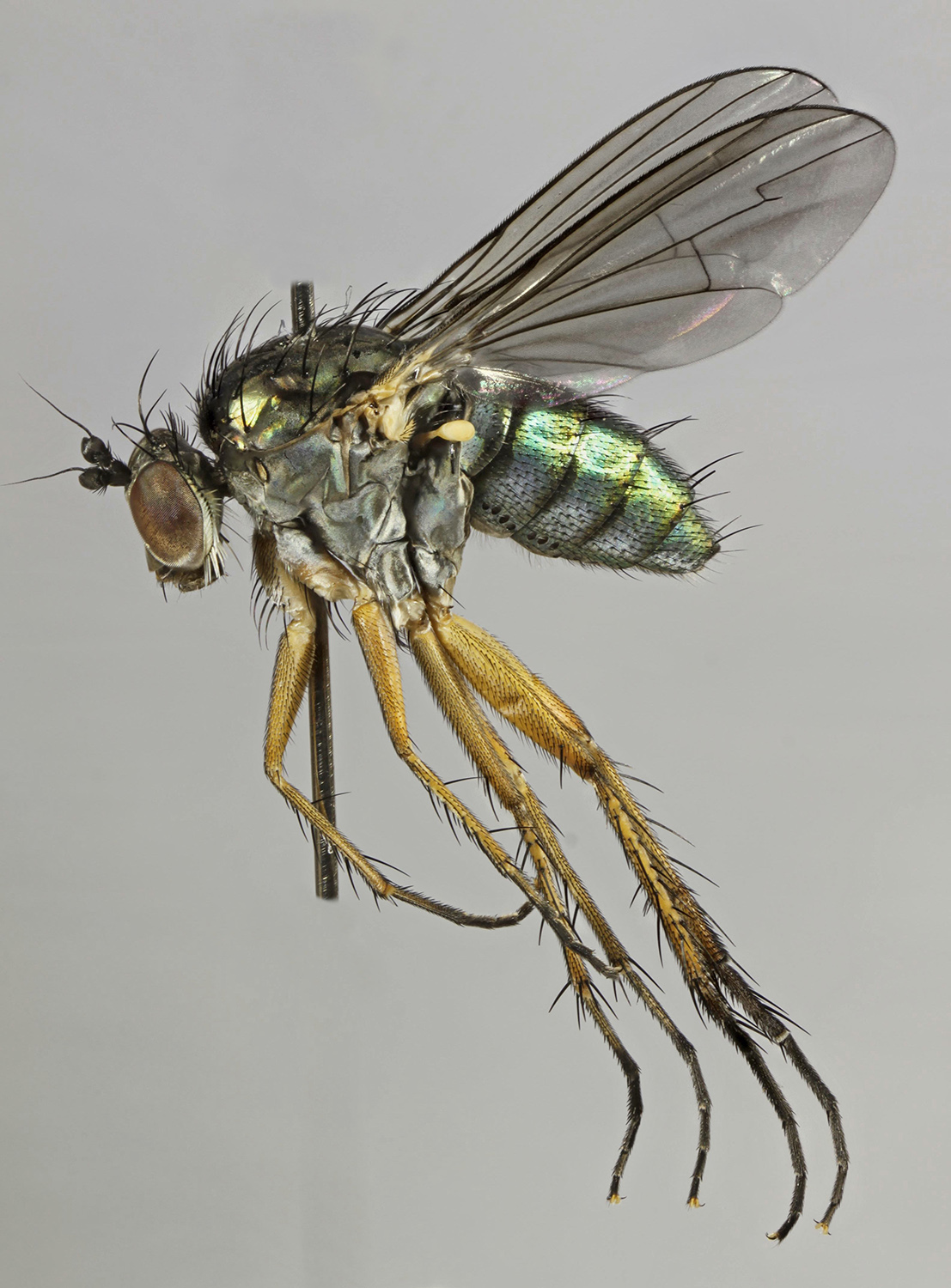
- Dolichopus diadema North Wales

Scientific classification
- Kingdom: Animalia
- Phylum: Arthropoda
- Clade: Pancrustacea
- Class: Insecta
- Order: Diptera
- Family: Dolichopodidae
- Genus: Dolichopus
- Species: D. diadema

Binomial name
- Dolichopus diadema Haliday, 1832

Synonyms
- Dolichopus fraternus Stæger, 1842; Dolichopus stannii Zetterstedt, 1843

= Dolichopus diadema =

Species of fly

Dolichopus diadema is a species of fly in the family Dolichopodidae. It is found in the Palearctic.
