= Dolichopus consanguineus =

Scientific classification
- Kingdom: Animalia
- Phylum: Arthropoda
- Clade: Pancrustacea
- Class: Insecta
- Order: Diptera
- Family: Dolichopodidae
- Genus: Dolichopus
- Species: D. consanguineus

Binomial name
- Dolichopus consanguineus (Wheeler, 1899)

Synonyms
- Hygroceleuthus consanguineus Wheeler, 1899

Species of fly

Dolichopus consanguineus is a species of long-legged fly in the family Dolichopodidae.
