= Dolichopus occidentalis =

Scientific classification
- Kingdom: Animalia
- Phylum: Arthropoda
- Clade: Pancrustacea
- Class: Insecta
- Order: Diptera
- Family: Dolichopodidae
- Genus: Dolichopus
- Species: D. occidentalis

Binomial name
- Dolichopus occidentalis Aldrich, 1893

Synonyms
- Dolichopus reticulus Van Duzee, 1926

Species of fly

Dolichopus occidentalis is a species of long-legged fly in the family Dolichopodidae.
