= Dolichopus ovatus =

Scientific classification
- Kingdom: Animalia
- Phylum: Arthropoda
- Clade: Pancrustacea
- Class: Insecta
- Order: Diptera
- Family: Dolichopodidae
- Genus: Dolichopus
- Species: D. ovatus

Binomial name
- Dolichopus ovatus Loew, 1861

Species of fly

Dolichopus ovatus is a species in the family Dolichopodidae ("longlegged flies"), in the order Diptera ("flies").
