= Dolichopus cuprinus =

Scientific classification
- Kingdom: Animalia
- Phylum: Arthropoda
- Clade: Pancrustacea
- Class: Insecta
- Order: Diptera
- Family: Dolichopodidae
- Genus: Dolichopus
- Species: D. cuprinus

Binomial name
- Dolichopus cuprinus Wiedemann, 1830

Synonyms
- Dolichopus cupreus Say, 1823 (nec Fallén, 1823)

Species of fly

Dolichopus cuprinus is a species of long-legged fly in the family Dolichopodidae.
