= Dolichopus acuminatus =

Scientific classification
- Kingdom: Animalia
- Phylum: Arthropoda
- Clade: Pancrustacea
- Class: Insecta
- Order: Diptera
- Family: Dolichopodidae
- Genus: Dolichopus
- Species: D. acuminatus

Binomial name
- Dolichopus acuminatus Loew, 1861

Species of fly

Dolichopus acuminatus is a species of long-legged fly in the family Dolichopodidae.
