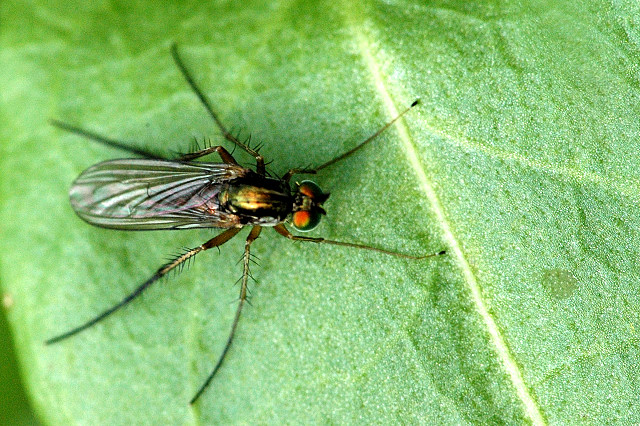
- Dolichopus discifer

Scientific classification
- Kingdom: Animalia
- Phylum: Arthropoda
- Clade: Pancrustacea
- Class: Insecta
- Order: Diptera
- Family: Dolichopodidae
- Genus: Dolichopus
- Species: D. discifer

Binomial name
- Dolichopus discifer Stannius, 1831

Synonyms
- Dolichopus confusus Zetterstedt, 1838; Dolichopus nigricornis Meigen, 1824 sensu Becker, 1917; Dolichopus patellatus Haliday, 1833; Dolichopus tanypus Loew, 1861

= Dolichopus discifer =

Species of fly

Dolichopus discifer is a European species of fly in family Dolichopodidae. It is sometimes stated to be a synonym of Dolichopus nigricornis Meigen, 1824, but according to Collin (1940) this synonymy should not be accepted, and the probable type of D. nigricornis (a female in Vienna) was Hercostomus gracilis (Stannius, 1831).

== Gallery ==
D. discifer in copula
