= Dolichopus setifer =

Scientific classification
- Kingdom: Animalia
- Phylum: Arthropoda
- Clade: Pancrustacea
- Class: Insecta
- Order: Diptera
- Family: Dolichopodidae
- Genus: Dolichopus
- Species: D. setifer

Binomial name
- Dolichopus setifer Loew, 1861

Synonyms
- Dolichopus michiganus Harmston and Knowlton, 1945

Species of fly

Dolichopus setifer is a species of long-legged fly in the family Dolichopodidae.
