= Dolichopus crenatus =

Scientific classification
- Kingdom: Animalia
- Phylum: Arthropoda
- Clade: Pancrustacea
- Class: Insecta
- Order: Diptera
- Family: Dolichopodidae
- Genus: Dolichopus
- Species: D. crenatus

Binomial name
- Dolichopus crenatus (Osten Sacken, 1877)

Synonyms
- Hygroceleuthus crenatus Osten Sacken, 1877

Species of fly

Dolichopus crenatus is a species of long-legged fly in the family Dolichopodidae.
