= Dolichopus pulchrimanus =

Scientific classification
- Kingdom: Animalia
- Phylum: Arthropoda
- Clade: Pancrustacea
- Class: Insecta
- Order: Diptera
- Family: Dolichopodidae
- Genus: Dolichopus
- Species: D. pulchrimanus

Binomial name
- Dolichopus pulchrimanus (Bigot, 1888)

Synonyms
- Dolichopus willistonii Aldrich, 1893; Spathichira pulchrimanus Bigot, 1888

Species of fly

Dolichopus pulchrimanus is a species of long-legged fly in the family Dolichopodidae.
