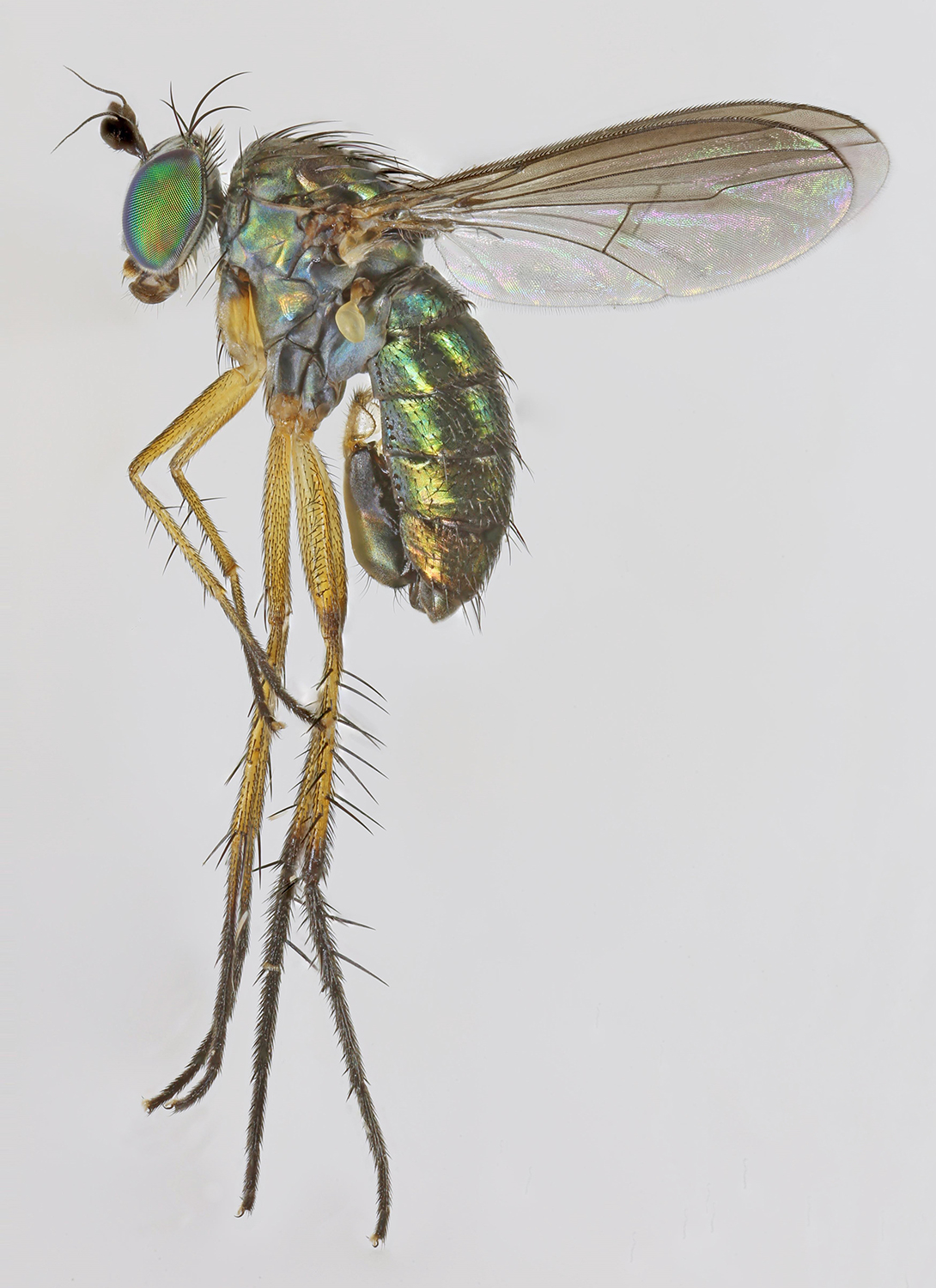
- Dolichopus nubilus North Wales

Scientific classification
- Kingdom: Animalia
- Phylum: Arthropoda
- Clade: Pancrustacea
- Class: Insecta
- Order: Diptera
- Family: Dolichopodidae
- Genus: Dolichopus
- Species: D. nubilus

Binomial name
- Dolichopus nubilus Meigen, 1824

Synonyms
- Dolichopus actaeus Haliday, 1832; Dolichopus inquinatus Haliday, 1832; Dolichopus pallipes Macquart, 1827

= Dolichopus nubilus =

Species of fly

Dolichopus nubilus is a species of fly in the family Dolichopodidae. It is found in the Palearctic.
