= Dolichopus sincerus =

Scientific classification
- Kingdom: Animalia
- Phylum: Arthropoda
- Clade: Pancrustacea
- Class: Insecta
- Order: Diptera
- Family: Dolichopodidae
- Genus: Dolichopus
- Species: D. sincerus

Binomial name
- Dolichopus sincerus Melander, 1900

Synonyms
- Dolichopus sincerus var. subdirectus Van Duzee, 1921; Dolichopus frosti Runyon, 2008

Species of fly

Dolichopus sincerus is a species of long-legged fly in the family Dolichopodidae.
