= Dolichopus pantomimus =

Scientific classification
- Kingdom: Animalia
- Phylum: Arthropoda
- Clade: Pancrustacea
- Class: Insecta
- Order: Diptera
- Family: Dolichopodidae
- Genus: Dolichopus
- Species: D. pantomimus

Binomial name
- Dolichopus pantomimus Melander & Brues, 1900

Species of fly

Dolichopus pantomimus is a species of longlegged fly in the family Dolichopodidae. It is found in North America.
