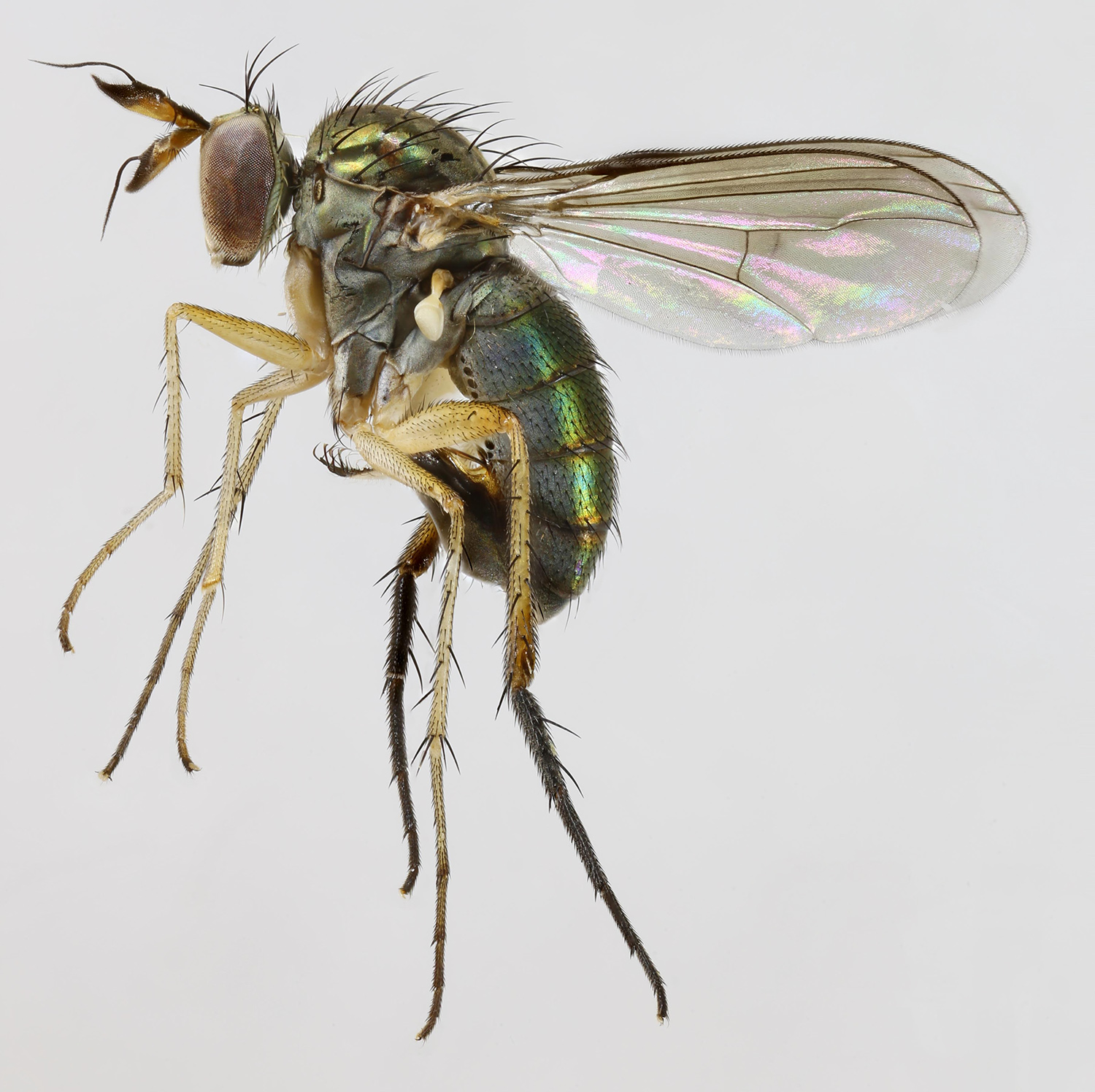
- Dolichopus longicornis North Wales

Scientific classification
- Kingdom: Animalia
- Phylum: Arthropoda
- Clade: Pancrustacea
- Class: Insecta
- Order: Diptera
- Family: Dolichopodidae
- Genus: Dolichopus
- Species: D. longicornis

Binomial name
- Dolichopus longicornis Stannius, 1831

Synonyms
- Dolichopus acuticornis Haliday, 1835

= Dolichopus longicornis =

Species of fly

Dolichopus longicornis is a species of fly in the family Dolichopodidae. It is found in the Palearctic.
