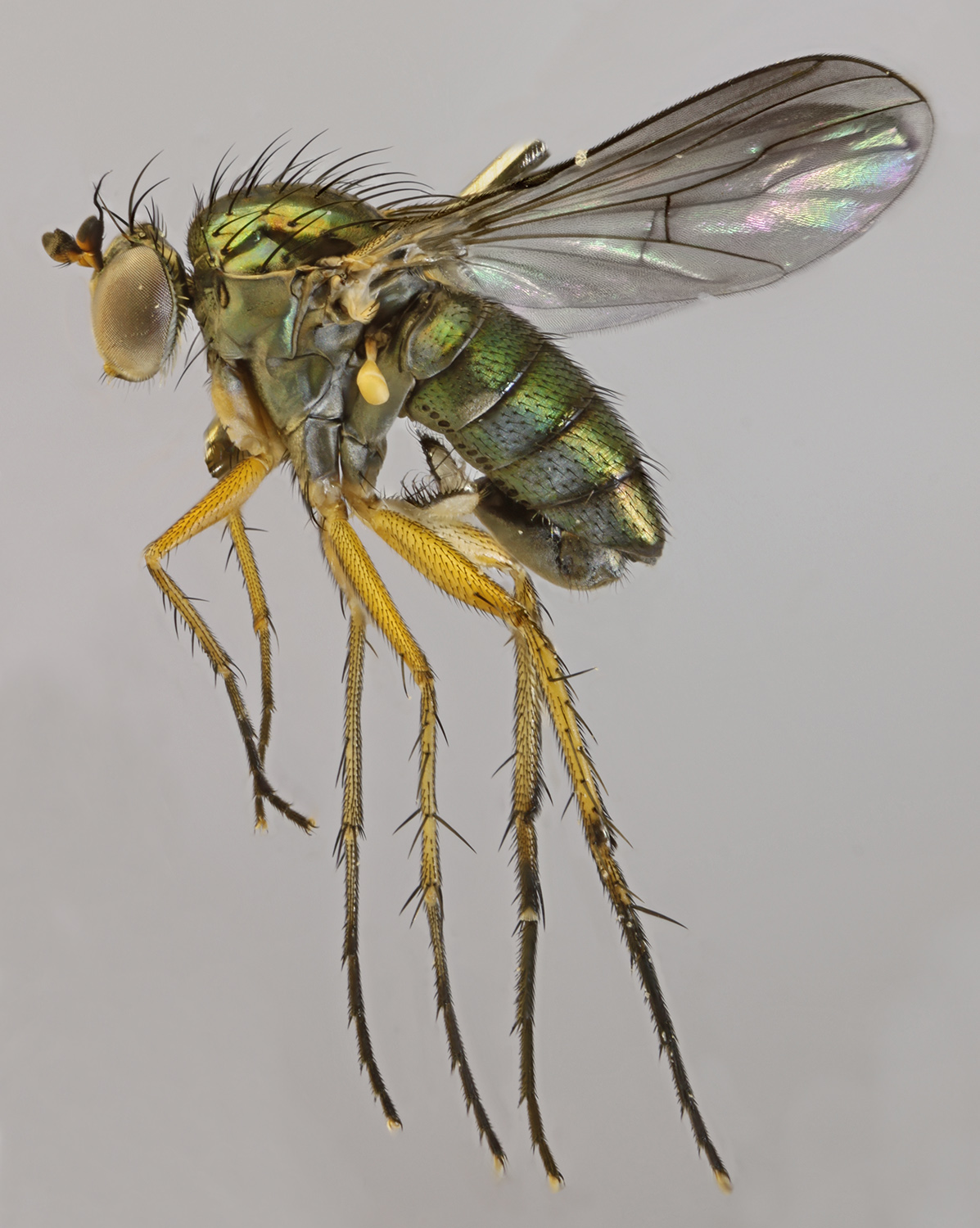
- Dolichopus sabinus North Wales

Scientific classification
- Kingdom: Animalia
- Phylum: Arthropoda
- Clade: Pancrustacea
- Class: Insecta
- Order: Diptera
- Family: Dolichopodidae
- Genus: Dolichopus
- Species: D. sabinus

Binomial name
- Dolichopus sabinus Haliday, 1838

Synonyms
- Dolichopus pictus Stæger, 1842

= Dolichopus sabinus =

Species of fly

Dolichopus sabinus is a species of fly in the family Dolichopodidae. It is native to Europe, though it has also been recorded from Tanzania in Africa.
