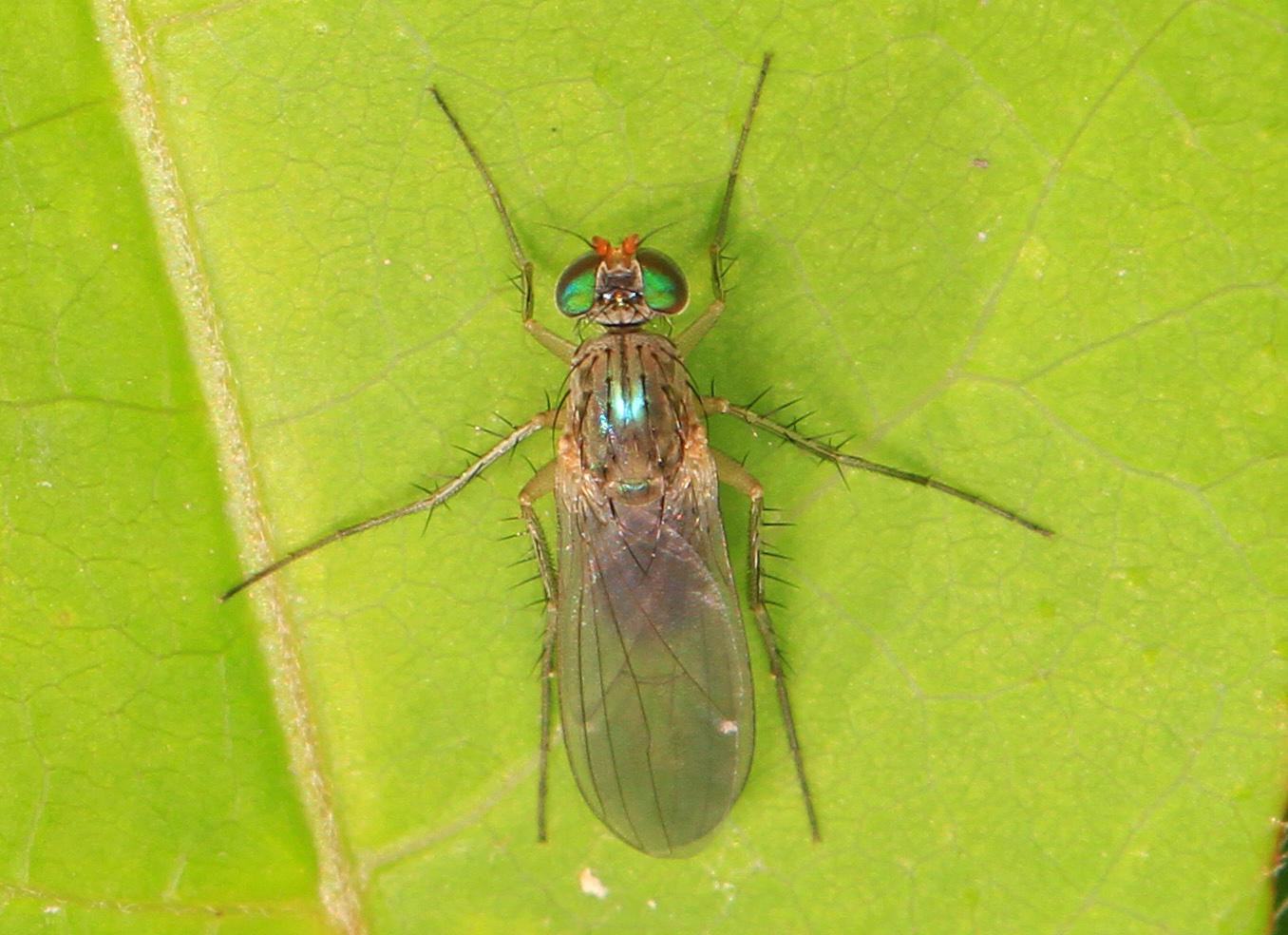

Scientific classification
- Kingdom: Animalia
- Phylum: Arthropoda
- Clade: Pancrustacea
- Class: Insecta
- Order: Diptera
- Family: Dolichopodidae
- Genus: Dolichopus
- Species: D. scapularis

Binomial name
- Dolichopus scapularis Loew, 1861

= Dolichopus scapularis =

Species of fly

Dolichopus scapularis is a species of long-legged fly in the family Dolichopodidae.

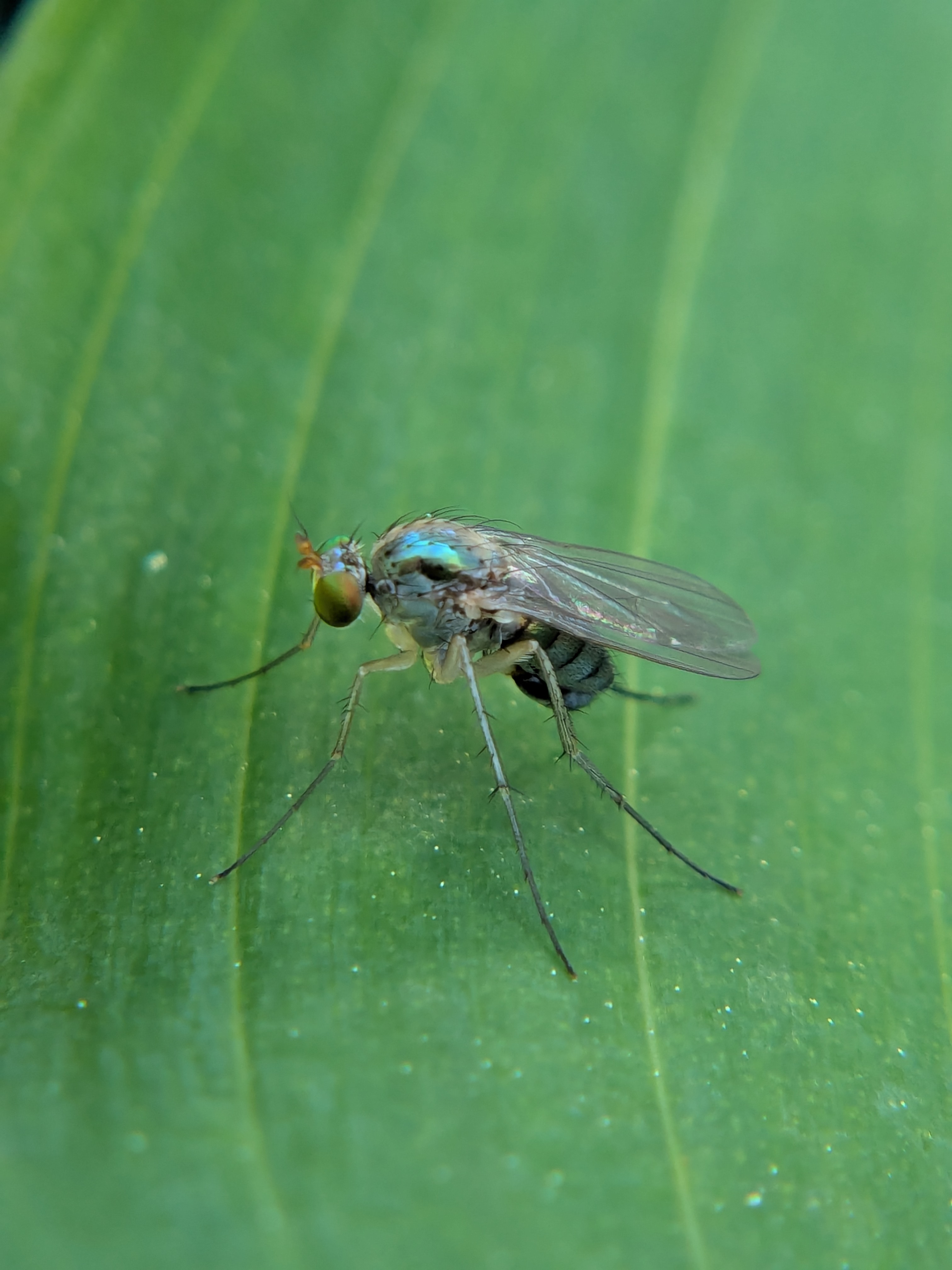
Adult Dolichopus scapularis. NY, USA.
