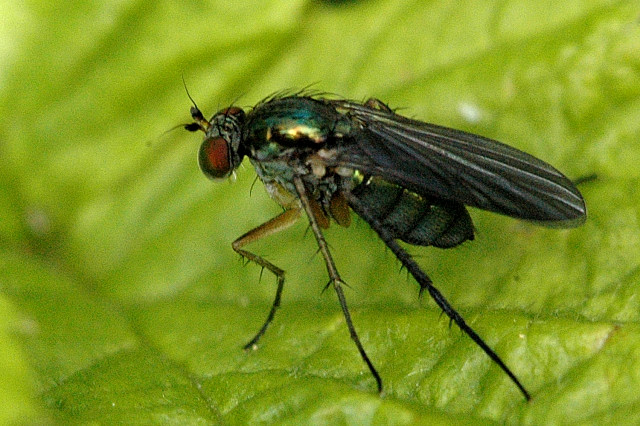

Scientific classification
- Kingdom: Animalia
- Phylum: Arthropoda
- Clade: Pancrustacea
- Class: Insecta
- Order: Diptera
- Family: Dolichopodidae
- Subfamily: Dolichopodinae
- Tribe: Dolichopodini
- Genus: Dolichopus
- Species: D. urbanus

Binomial name
- Dolichopus urbanus Meigen, 1824

Synonyms
- Dolichopus atritibialis Zetterstedt, 1859

= Dolichopus urbanus =

Species of fly

Dolichopus urbanus is a European species of flies in family Dolichopodidae.
