= Dolichopus albicoxa =

Scientific classification
- Kingdom: Animalia
- Phylum: Arthropoda
- Clade: Pancrustacea
- Class: Insecta
- Order: Diptera
- Family: Dolichopodidae
- Genus: Dolichopus
- Species: D. albicoxa

Binomial name
- Dolichopus albicoxa Aldrich, 1893

Species of fly

Dolichopus albicoxa is a species of longlegged flies in the family Dolichopodidae.
