= Dolichopus idahoensis =

Scientific classification
- Kingdom: Animalia
- Phylum: Arthropoda
- Clade: Pancrustacea
- Class: Insecta
- Order: Diptera
- Family: Dolichopodidae
- Genus: Dolichopus
- Species: D. idahoensis

Binomial name
- Dolichopus idahoensis (Aldrich, 1894)

Synonyms
- Hygroceleuthus idahoensis Aldrich, 1894

Species of fly

Dolichopus idahoensis is a species of long-legged fly in the family Dolichopodidae.
