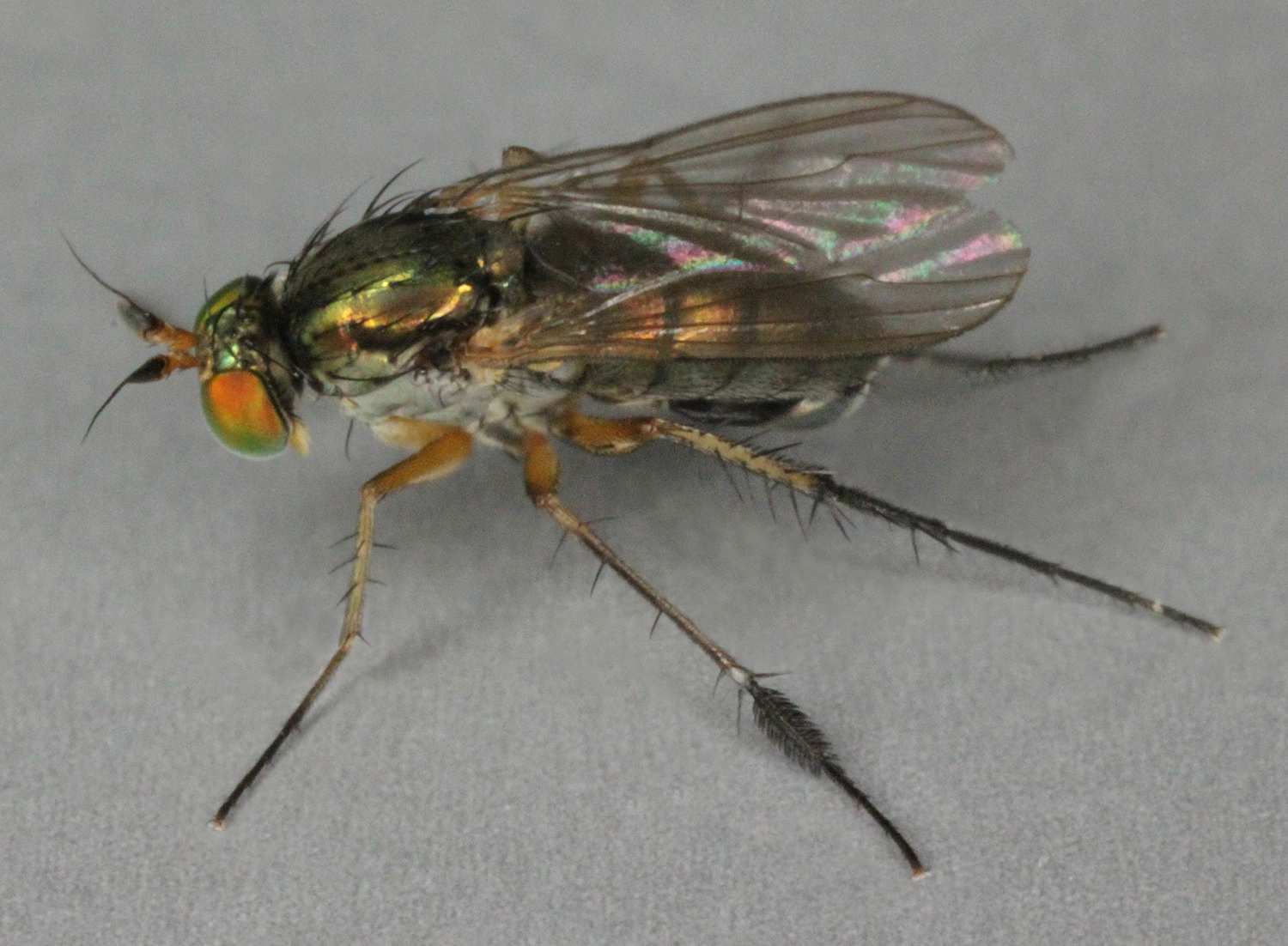
- Dolichopus plumipes North Wales

Scientific classification
- Kingdom: Animalia
- Phylum: Arthropoda
- Clade: Pancrustacea
- Class: Insecta
- Order: Diptera
- Family: Dolichopodidae
- Genus: Dolichopus
- Species: D. plumipes

Binomial name
- Dolichopus plumipes (Scopoli, 1763)

Synonyms
- Musca plumipes Scopoli, 1763; Dolichopus pennitarsis Fallén, 1823; Dolichopus parvicaudatus Zetterstedt, 1843; Dolichopus ciliatus Walker, 1849; Dolichopus sequax Walker, 1849; Dolichopus pectinitarsis Stenhammar, 1851; Dolichopus nigroapicalis Van Duzee, 1930

= Dolichopus plumipes =

Species of fly

Dolichopus plumipes is a species of fly in the family Dolichopodidae. It is found in most of North America, except for the eastern United States and Manitoba Canada, as well as most of northern Europe and Asia.
