= Dolichopus canaliculatus =

Scientific classification
- Kingdom: Animalia
- Phylum: Arthropoda
- Clade: Pancrustacea
- Class: Insecta
- Order: Diptera
- Family: Dolichopodidae
- Genus: Dolichopus
- Species: D. canaliculatus

Binomial name
- Dolichopus canaliculatus Thomson, 1869

Species of fly

Dolichopus canaliculatus is a species of long-legged fly in the family Dolichopodidae.
