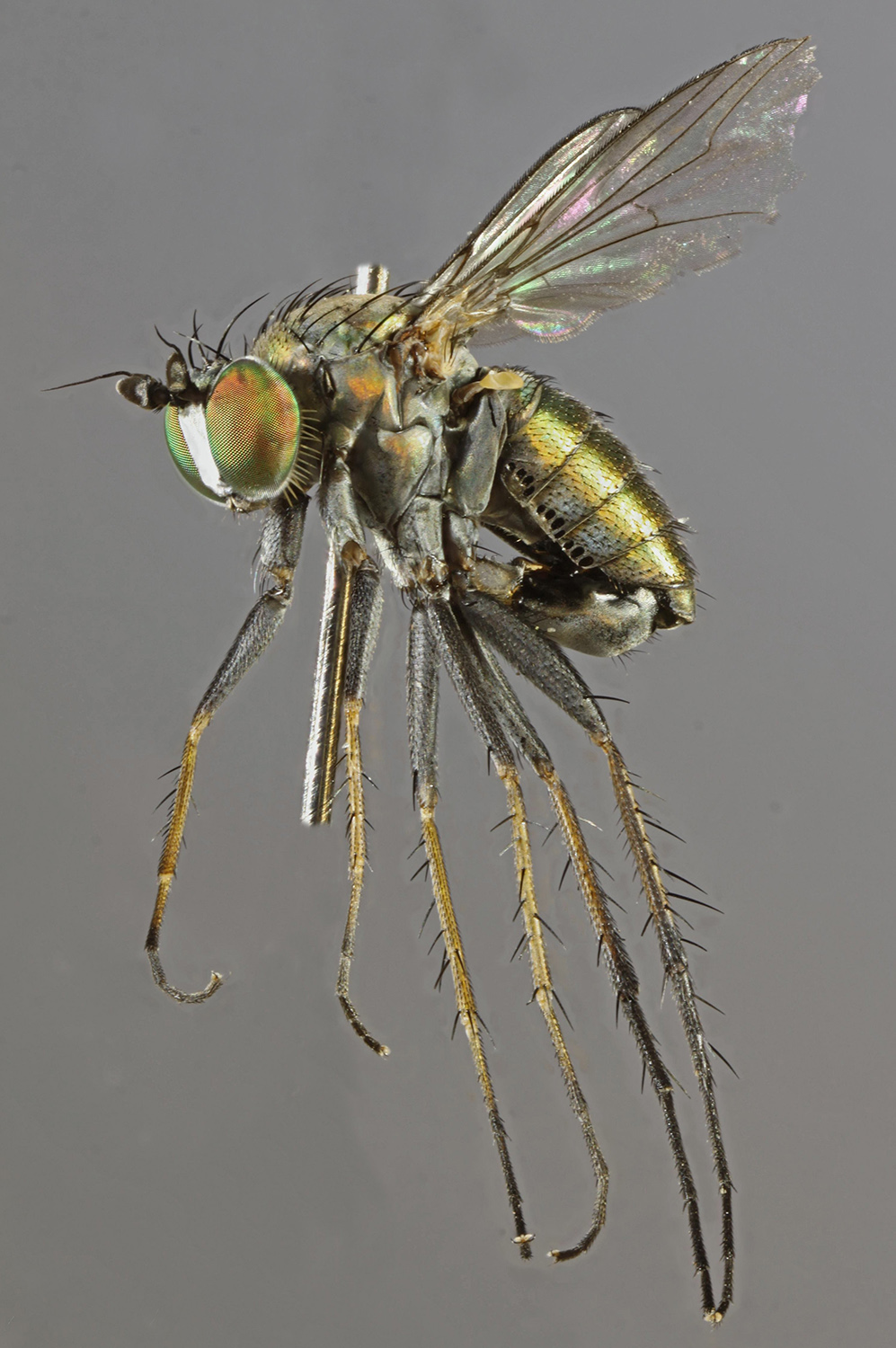
- Dolichopus vitripennis North Wales

Scientific classification
- Kingdom: Animalia
- Phylum: Arthropoda
- Clade: Pancrustacea
- Class: Insecta
- Order: Diptera
- Family: Dolichopodidae
- Genus: Dolichopus
- Species: D. vitripennis

Binomial name
- Dolichopus vitripennis Meigen, 1824

Synonyms
- Dolichopus brachycerus Zetterstedt, 1843; Dolichopus tibiellus Zetterstedt, 1843; Dolichopus braueri Nowicki, 1867; Dolichopus spretus Loew, 1871

= Dolichopus vitripennis =

Species of fly

Dolichopus vitripennis is a species of fly in the family Dolichopodidae. It is found in the Palearctic.
