= Peter Fredrik Wahlberg =

Swedish entomologist (1800–1877)

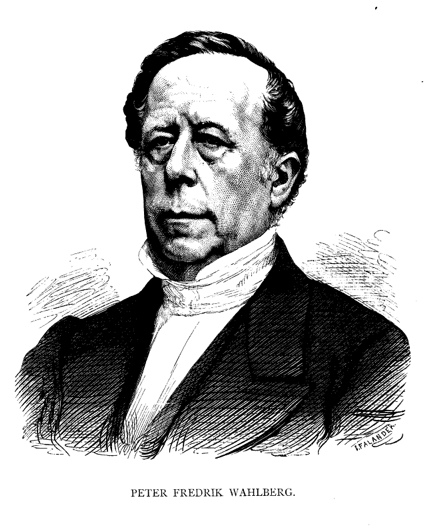
A picture of Peter Fredrik Wahlberg

Peter Fredrik Wahlberg (19 June 1800, in Gothenburg – 22 May 1877, in Stockholm) was a Swedish entomologist and professor at the University College of Stockholm.

Wahlberg was a member of the Royal Swedish Academy of Sciences from 1830, and served as the academy's secretary from 1848 to 1866.

The island Wahlbergøya, the largest of Vaigattøyane, is named after him.

== Works ==
- Om Rhaphium flavipalpe Zett. fvers. K. Vetenskapsakad. Forh. 1: 37-38 (1844)
- Bidrag till kännedomen om de nordiska Diptera. Öfversigt af Kongl. Vetenskapsakademien Förhandlingar, Stockholm. 11. 211–216. (1854).
