= List of Hercostomus species =

This is a list of 446 species in Hercostomus, a genus of long-legged flies in the family Dolichopodidae.

== Hercostomus species ==
- Hercostomus abnormis Yang, 1996
- Hercostomus abortivus Parent, 1935
- Hercostomus absimilis Yang & Grootaert, 1999
- Hercostomus acutangulatus Yang & Saigusa, 1999
- Hercostomus acuticornutus Yang, Saigusa & Masunaga, 2002
- Hercostomus acutiformis Negrobov, Kumazawa & Tago, 2016
- Hercostomus acutilobatus Liao, Zhou & Yang, 2006
- Hercostomus acutus Yang & Saigusa, 2002
- Hercostomus additus Parent, 1926
- Hercostomus albibarbus Negrobov, 1976
- Hercostomus albicoxa Pollet & Kazerani, 2017
- Hercostomus albidipes Becker, 1922
- Hercostomus albipodus Harmston & Knowlton, 1941
- Hercostomus amabilis Wei & Song, 2006
- Hercostomus amissus Bickel, 2008
- Hercostomus amoenus (Becker, 1922)
- Hercostomus anae Zhang, Yang & Masunaga, 2007
- Hercostomus anatoliensis Tonguc, Grootaert & Barlas, 2016
- Hercostomus angustus (Loew, 1857)
- Hercostomus anomalipennis Stackelberg, 1933
- Hercostomus apicilaris Yang & Grootaert, 1999
- Hercostomus apiciniger Yang & Grootaert, 1999
- Hercostomus apicispinus Yang & Saigusa, 2002
- Hercostomus apiculatus Yang & Grootaert, 1999
- Hercostomus apiculus Wei, 1997
- Hercostomus apollo (Loew, 1869)
- Hercostomus argentifacies Parent, 1933
- Hercostomus argentifrons Oldenberg, 1916
- Hercostomus argyraceus Negrobov & Chalaya, 1987
- Hercostomus argyreus (Wei & Lu, 1996)
- Hercostomus atypicalis Bickel, 2008
- Hercostomus aurifacies Parent, 1933
- Hercostomus aurifer (Thomson, 1869)
- Hercostomus autumnalis Parent, 1935
- Hercostomus baishanzuensis Yang & Yang, 1995
- Hercostomus baishuihensis Yang & Saigusa, 2001
- Hercostomus baixionggouanus Qilemoge, Liu & Yang, 2017
- Hercostomus bakeri Frey, 1928
- Hercostomus balensis Grichanov, 2004
- Hercostomus basalis Yang, 1996
- Hercostomus basantapuranus Yang, Saigusa & Masunaga, 2002
- †Hercostomus bauckhorni (Meunier, 1915)
- Hercostomus beijingensis Yang, 1996
- Hercostomus biancistrus Yang & Saigusa, 2001
- Hercostomus bicolor Yang & Saigusa, 2001
- Hercostomus bidentatus Zhang, Yang & Grootaert, 2007
- Hercostomus bigeminatus Yang & Grootaert, 1999
- Hercostomus binatus Yang, 1999
- Hercostomus binotatus De Meijere, 1916
- Hercostomus bisetus Tang, Zhang & Yang, 2014
- Hercostomus bispinifer Yang & Saigusa, 1999
- Hercostomus blepharopus Loew, 1871
- Hercostomus brandbergensis Grichanov, 2020
- Hercostomus brevicercus Yang & Saigusa, 2001
- Hercostomus brevicornis Zhang, Yang & Grootaert, 2008
- Hercostomus brevidigitalis Zhang, Yang & Grootaert, 2008
- Hercostomus brevifurcatus Yang & Saigusa, 2001
- Hercostomus brevilobatus Yang, Saigusa & Masunaga, 2002
- Hercostomus brevis Yang, 1997
- Hercostomus breviseta Zhang, Yang & Grootaert, 2008
- Hercostomus brevispinus Yang & Saigusa, 2001
- Hercostomus breviventris Parent, 1941
- Hercostomus brunneipygus (De Meijere, 1916)
- Hercostomus cacheae Harmston & Knowlton, 1941
- Hercostomus caecus Becker, 1922
- Hercostomus caixiae Zhang, Yang & Grootaert, 2003
- Hercostomus calcaratus Stackelberg, 1931
- Hercostomus canariensis Santos Abreu, 1929
- Hercostomus chaetilamellatus Harmston & Knowlton, 1941
- Hercostomus chaeturus Yang & Grootaert, 1999
- Hercostomus chetifer (Walker, 1849)
- Hercostomus chiaiensis Zhang, Yang & Masunaga, 2005
- Hercostomus chiliwanus Yang, Saigusa & Masunaga, 2002
- Hercostomus clavatus Wei, 1997
- Hercostomus coloradensis Harmston, 1952
- Hercostomus completus Yang, Saigusa & Masunaga, 2002
- Hercostomus compositus Becker, 1922
- Hercostomus comsus Wei & Song, 2005
- Hercostomus concavus Yang & Saigusa, 1999
- Hercostomus concisus Yang & Saigusa, 2002
- Hercostomus conformis (Loew, 1857)
- Hercostomus convergens (Loew, 1857)
- Hercostomus costalis Van Duzee, 1923
- Hercostomus costatus (Loew, 1857)
- Hercostomus crassiseta Yang & Saigusa, 2001
- Hercostomus crassivenus Bickel, 2008
- Hercostomus cryptus Harmston & Knowlton, 1941
- Hercostomus curvarmatus Yang & Saigusa, 2000
- Hercostomus curvativus Yang & Saigusa, 1999
- Hercostomus curvilobatus Yang & Saigusa, 2002
- Hercostomus curviphallus Yang & Saigusa, 2002
- Hercostomus curviseta Yang & Saigusa, 2002
- Hercostomus curvispinosus Yang & Saigusa, 1999
- Hercostomus curvispinus Yang & Saigusa, 2000
- Hercostomus curvus Yang & Saigusa, 2002
- Hercostomus cuspidicercus Olejníček, 2004
- Hercostomus cuspidiger Yang & Saigusa, 2000
- Hercostomus cylindripyga Stackelberg, 1931
- Hercostomus cyprius Parent, 1937
- Hercostomus dacicus Parvu, 1991
- Hercostomus dactylocera (Grootaert & Meuffels, 2001)
- Hercostomus dashahensis Zhang, Wei & Yang, 2009
- Hercostomus daweishanus Yang & Saigusa, 2001
- Hercostomus dayaoshanensis Liao, Zhou & Yang, 2007
- Hercostomus deltodontus Tang, Zhang & Yang, 2014
- Hercostomus dentalis Yang, 1997
- Hercostomus dentatus Yang, Saigusa & Masunaga, 2002
- Hercostomus dichromopyga Stackelberg, 1933
- Hercostomus digitatus Yang, 1997
- Hercostomus digitiformis Yang & Grootaert, 1999
- Hercostomus dilatitarsis Stackelberg, 1949
- Hercostomus discriminatus Parent, 1925
- Hercostomus dissectus Yang & Saigusa, 1999
- Hercostomus dissimilis Yang & Saigusa, 1999
- Hercostomus dorsiniger Yang & Saigusa, 2001
- Hercostomus dorsiseta Yang & Saigusa, 2001
- Hercostomus dui Wei, 1997
- Hercostomus ebaeus Wei, 1997
- Hercostomus effugius Wei & Song, 2006
- Hercostomus effusus Wei & Song, 2006
- Hercostomus elongatus Becker, 1922
- Hercostomus emarginatus Yang, Saigusa & Masunaga, 2002
- Hercostomus emeiensis Yang, 1997
- Hercostomus emotoi Yang, Saigusa & Masunaga, 2002
- Hercostomus enghoffi Grichanov, 1999
- Hercostomus erectus Yang & Grootaert, 1999
- Hercostomus eugenii Stackelberg, 1949
- Hercostomus exacutus Wei, 1997
- Hercostomus exarticulatoides Stackelberg, 1949
- Hercostomus exarticulatus (Loew, 1857)
- Hercostomus excertus Wei & Song, 2006
- Hercostomus excipiens Becker, 1907
- Hercostomus excisilamellatus Parent, 1944
- Hercostomus falcilis Negrobov, Kumazawa & Tago, 2016
- Hercostomus fanjingensis Wei, 1997
- Hercostomus fatuus Wei, 1997
- Hercostomus fedotovae Grichanov, 2020
- Hercostomus filiformis Yang & Saigusa, 2001
- Hercostomus fistulus Wei, 1997
- Hercostomus flatus Yang & Grootaert, 1999
- Hercostomus flavicans Grootaert & Meuffels, 2001
- Hercostomus flavicinctus Becker, 1922
- Hercostomus flavicoxus Negrobov & Logvinovskij, 1977
- Hercostomus flavimaculatus Yang, 1998
- Hercostomus flavimarginatus Yang, 1999
- Hercostomus flavipalpus Negrobov, Kumazawa, Tago & Sato, 2016
- Hercostomus flavipes (von Roder, 1884)
- Hercostomus flaviscapus Yang & Saigusa, 2000
- Hercostomus flaviscutellum Yang, 1998
- Hercostomus flaviventris Smirnov & Negrobov, 1979
- Hercostomus flavus Tang, Zhang & Yang, 2014
- Hercostomus flexus Wei, 1997
- Hercostomus flutatus Harmston & Knowlton, 1945
- Hercostomus fluvius Wei, 1997
- Hercostomus fluxus Wei, 1997
- Hercostomus freidbergi Grichanov, 2004
- Hercostomus frondosus Wei, 1997
- Hercostomus fugax (Loew, 1857)
- Hercostomus fulgidipes (Becker, 1922)
- Hercostomus fulvicaudis (Haliday in Walker, 1851)
- Hercostomus fupingensis Yang & Saigusa, 2002
- Hercostomus furcatus Yang, 1996
- Hercostomus furcutus Wei, 1997
- Hercostomus fuscipennis (Meigen, 1824)
- Hercostomus galonglaensis Tang, Zhang & Yang, 2014
- Hercostomus gansuensis Yang, 1996
- Hercostomus gaoae Yang, Grootaert & Song, 2002
- Hercostomus gavarniae Parent, 1927
- Hercostomus geniculatus Zhang, Yang & Masunaga, 2007
- Hercostomus germanus (Wiedemann, 1817)
- Hercostomus golanensis Grichanov, 2015
- Hercostomus gongshanensis Zhang & Yang, 2010
- Hercostomus gracilior Negrobov, 1976
- Hercostomus gracilis (Stannius, 1831)
- Hercostomus grandicercus Negrobov & Nechay, 2009
- Hercostomus griseifrons Becker, 1910
- Hercostomus gymnopygus Frey, 1925
- Hercostomus hainanensis Zhang, Wei & Yang, 2009
- Hercostomus heinrichi Grichanov, 2004
- Hercostomus henanus Yang, 1999
- Hercostomus himertus Wei, 1997
- Hercostomus histus Wei, 1997
- Hercostomus hoplitus Wei & Song, 2006
- Hercostomus huaguoensis Zhang & Yang, 2007
- Hercostomus hualienensis Zhang, Yang & Masunaga, 2005
- Hercostomus huanglianshanus Yang & Saigusa, 2001
- Hercostomus hubeiensis Yang & Saigusa, 2001
- Hercostomus huizhouensis Zhang, Yang & Grootaert, 2008
- Hercostomus humeralis Frey, 1925
- Hercostomus hunanensis Yang, 1998
- Hercostomus hypogaeus Wei & Song, 2006
- Hercostomus ibericus Naglis & Bartak, 2015
- Hercostomus ignarus Wei & Song, 2006
- Hercostomus imperfectus (Becker, 1922)
- Hercostomus impudicus Wheeler, 1899
- Hercostomus incilis Yang & Saigusa, 2001
- Hercostomus incisus Yang & Saigusa, 2000
- Hercostomus inclusus Becker, 1922
- Hercostomus incrassatus Becker, 1922
- Hercostomus indistinctus Yang, Saigusa & Masunaga, 2002
- Hercostomus infirmus Parent, 1933
- Hercostomus insularum Becker, 1917
- Hercostomus intactus Wei, 1997
- Hercostomus intercedens Grichanov, 2004
- Hercostomus interstinctus Becker, 1922
- Hercostomus intraneus Yang & Saigusa, 2001
- Hercostomus javanensis (De Meijere, 1916)
- Hercostomus jindinganus Yang & Saigusa, 2000
- Hercostomus jingpingensis Yang & Saigusa, 2001
- Hercostomus jingxingensis Yang & Saigusa, 2001
- Hercostomus jinxiuensis Yang, 1997
- Hercostomus jiulongensis Zhang & Yang, 2005
- Hercostomus kedrovicus Negrobov & Logvinovskij, 1977
- Hercostomus kefaensis Grichanov, 2004
- Hercostomus koshelevae Grichanov, 2020
- Hercostomus kravchenkoi Grichanov & Freidberg, 2018
- Hercostomus krivosheinae Grichanov, 1999
- Hercostomus labiatus (Loew, 1871)
- Hercostomus lanceolatus Zhang, Yang & Grootaert, 2008
- Hercostomus lateralis Yang & Saigusa, 1999
- Hercostomus latilobatus Yang & Saigusa, 2001
- Hercostomus latus Yang & Saigusa, 2002
- Hercostomus laufferi (Strobl, 1909)
- Hercostomus leigongshanus Wei & Yang, 2007
- Hercostomus lelepanus Yang, Saigusa & Masunaga, 2002
- Hercostomus libanicola Parent, 1933
- Hercostomus lichtwardti Villeneuve, 1899
- Hercostomus lijiangensis Yang & Saigusa, 2001
- Hercostomus limosus Zhang, Yang & Grootaert, 2008
- Hercostomus litargus Wei, 1997
- Hercostomus longicercus Yang & Yang, 1995
- Hercostomus longidigitatus Yang & Saigusa, 2001
- Hercostomus longifolius Yang & Saigusa, 2000
- Hercostomus longilamellus Harmston & Knowlton, 1940
- Hercostomus longilobatus Yang & Saigusa, 2001
- Hercostomus longipulvinatus Yang, 1998
- Hercostomus longisetus Yang & Saigusa, 2000
- Hercostomus longispinus Yang & Saigusa, 2001
- Hercostomus longiventris (Loew, 1857)
- Hercostomus longus Yang & Saigusa, 2000
- Hercostomus longyuwanensis Zhang, Yang & Grootaert, 2008
- Hercostomus lotus Yang & Saigusa, 2002
- Hercostomus loushanguananus Yang & Saigusa, 2001
- Hercostomus lucidiventris Becker, 1922
- Hercostomus lunulatus Becker, 1922
- Hercostomus luoshanensis Yang & Saigusa, 2000
- Hercostomus luteipleuratus Parent, 1944
- Hercostomus luteus Parent, 1927
- Hercostomus macropygus De Meijere, 1916
- Hercostomus maculithorax Stackelberg, 1931
- Hercostomus magnicornis (De Meijere, 1916)
- Hercostomus maoershanensis Zhang, Yang & Masunaga, 2004
- Hercostomus marginatus Yang & Saigusa, 2001
- Hercostomus masunagai Yang & Saigusa, 2001
- Hercostomus medialis Yang & Saigusa, 2001
- Hercostomus meieri Zhang, Yang & Grootaert, 2008
- Hercostomus mengyangensis Zhang & Yang, 2010
- Hercostomus minutus Negrobov & Logvinovskij, 1977
- Hercostomus modestus (De Meijere, 1916)
- Hercostomus modificatus Yang & Saigusa, 2002
- Hercostomus mostovskii Grichanov, 1999
- Hercostomus motuoensis Zhang, Yang & Grootaert, 2008
- Hercostomus nakanishii Yang, Saigusa & Masunaga, 2002
- Hercostomus nanjingensis Yang, 1996
- Hercostomus nanlingensis Zhang, Yang & Grootaert, 2008
- Hercostomus nantouensis Zhang, Yang & Grootaert, 2008
- Hercostomus nanus (Macquart, 1827)
- Hercostomus napoensis Yang, Grootaert & Song, 2002
- Hercostomus nartshukae Negrobov & Logvinovskij, 1976
- Hercostomus nectarophagus Curran, 1924
- Hercostomus neglectus Becker, 1922
- Hercostomus neimengensis Yang, 1997
- Hercostomus neocryptus Harmston & Knowlton, 1941
- Hercostomus nepalensis Yang, Saigusa & Masunaga, 2002
- Hercostomus ngozi Grichanov, 2004
- Hercostomus nigricollaris Negrobov, Kumazawa & Tago, 2016
- Hercostomus nigrilamellatus (Macquart, 1827)
- Hercostomus nigripalpus Yang & Saigusa, 2002
- Hercostomus nigripennis (Fallén, 1823)
- Hercostomus nigriplantis (Stannius, 1831)
- Hercostomus nigrohalteratus Becker, 1909
- Hercostomus notatus Becker, 1922
- Hercostomus nuciformis Tang, Zhang & Yang, 2014
- Hercostomus nudiusculus Yang, 1999
- Hercostomus nudus Yang, 1996
- Hercostomus obesus Wei, 1997
- Hercostomus obtusus Samoh & Grootaert, 2024
- Hercostomus occidentalis Cole, 1912
- Hercostomus ogloblini Stackelberg, 1949
- Hercostomus orbicularis Harmston, 1952
- Hercostomus ovalicosta Hollis, 1964
- Hercostomus ovatus Becker, 1922
- Hercostomus ozerovi Grichanov, 1999
- Hercostomus pachynervis Ramos & Grootaert, 2018
- Hercostomus pailongensis Tang, Zhang & Yang, 2014
- Hercostomus pallidus Loew, 1871
- Hercostomus pallipilosus Yang & Saigusa, 2002
- Hercostomus pandellei Parent, 1926
- Hercostomus papunanus Yang, Saigusa & Masunaga, 2002
- Hercostomus patellitarsis (Parent, 1934)
- Hercostomus peronus Wei, 1997
- Hercostomus perspicillatus Wei, 1997
- Hercostomus perturbus Curran, 1924
- Hercostomus phaedrus Wei, 1997
- Hercostomus philpotti Parent, 1933
- Hercostomus phoebus Parent, 1927
- Hercostomus phollae Hollis, 1964
- Hercostomus pilicercus Yang & Saigusa, 2001
- Hercostomus pilifacies Yang & Saigusa, 2001
- Hercostomus pingwuensis Qilemoge, Liu & Yang, 2017
- Hercostomus placidus (Loew, 1873)
- Hercostomus plagiatus (Loew, 1857)
- Hercostomus plumatus Zhang, Yang & Grootaert, 2008
- Hercostomus plumiger Yang & Saigusa, 2002
- Hercostomus pokivajlovi Maslova & Negrobov, 2011
- Hercostomus pokornyi Mik, 1889
- Hercostomus polleti Yang & Saigusa, 1999
- Hercostomus pollinifrons Parent, 1933
- Hercostomus porrectus Becker, 1922
- Hercostomus praetentans Lamb, 1924
- Hercostomus proboscideus Becker, 1907
- Hercostomus productus Wei, 1997
- Hercostomus projectus Yang & Saigusa, 2001
- Hercostomus prolongatus Yang, 1996
- Hercostomus promotus Becker, 1922
- Hercostomus qingchenganus Yang, 1998
- Hercostomus qinlingensis Yang & Saigusa, 2002
- Hercostomus quadratus Yang & Grootaert, 1999
- Hercostomus quadriseta Yang & Saigusa, 2001
- †Hercostomus quievreuxi Parent & Quievreux, 1935
- Hercostomus radialis Stackelberg, 1933
- Hercostomus regularis Becker, 1922
- Hercostomus riparius Negrobov & Grichanov, 1982
- Hercostomus rivulorum Stackelberg, 1933
- Hercostomus rogenhoferi (Mik, 1878)
- Hercostomus rostellatus (Loew, 1871)
- Hercostomus rothi (Zetterstedt, 1859)
- Hercostomus rubroviridis Parent, 1927
- Hercostomus rubroviridissimus Negrobov, 1977
- Hercostomus ruficauda (Zetterstedt, 1859)
- Hercostomus rusticus (Meigen, 1824)
- Hercostomus saetiger Yang & Saigusa, 2002
- Hercostomus sahlbergi (Zetterstedt, 1838)
- Hercostomus saigusai Olejnichek, 2004
- Hercostomus sanipass Grichanov, 2020
- Hercostomus sanjiangyuanus Liao, Zhou & Yang, 2009
- Hercostomus santosi Parent, 1929
- Hercostomus saranganicus Stackelberg, 1931
- Hercostomus sartus Stackelberg, 1927
- Hercostomus scotti Grichanov, 1999
- Hercostomus selikhovkini Grichanov, 1999
- Hercostomus separatus d'Assis Fonseca, 1976
- Hercostomus sequens Becker, 1922
- Hercostomus serratus Yang & Saigusa, 1999
- Hercostomus serriformis Liao, Zhou & Yang, 2006
- Hercostomus setitibia Kazerani & Pollet, 2017
- Hercostomus setosus (Van Duzee, 1913)
- Hercostomus shelkovnikovi Stackelberg, 1926
- Hercostomus shennongjiensis Yang, 1997
- Hercostomus shimai Yang & Saigusa, 2001
- Hercostomus sichuanensis Yang, 1997
- Hercostomus singaporensis Zhang, Yang & Grootaert, 2008
- Hercostomus sinicus Stackelberg, 1933
- Hercostomus siveci Zhang, Yang & Masunaga, 2005
- Hercostomus sodalis Becker, 1922
- Hercostomus solutus Wei, 1997
- Hercostomus songshanensis Zhang & Yang, 2011
- Hercostomus spathulatus Negrobov, Kumazawa, Tago & Sato, 2016
- Hercostomus spatiosus Yang, 1996
- Hercostomus spiniger Yang, 1997
- Hercostomus spinitarsis Yang & Saigusa, 2000
- Hercostomus spinitibialis Negrobov, Kumazawa & Tago, 2016
- Hercostomus squamatus Samoh & Grootaert, 2024
- Hercostomus stigmatifer Parent, 1944
- Hercostomus stroblianus Becker, 1917
- Hercostomus subapicispinus Yang & Saigusa, 2002
- Hercostomus subdentatus Yang, Saigusa & Masunaga, 2002
- Hercostomus subdigitatus Yang & Saigusa, 2001
- Hercostomus sublongus Yang & Saigusa, 2000
- Hercostomus subnovus Yang & Yang, 1995
- Hercostomus subrusticus Zhang, Yang & Grootaert, 2008
- Hercostomus subtruncatus Yang & Saigusa, 2002
- Hercostomus sviridovae Negrobov & Chalaya, 1987
- Hercostomus synolcus Steyskal, 1966
- Hercostomus tadzhikorum Stackelberg, 1933
- Hercostomus taipeiensis Zhang, Yang & Masunaga, 2005
- Hercostomus taitungensis Zhang, Yang & Masunaga, 2005
- Hercostomus taiwanensis Zhang, Yang & Masunaga, 2005
- Hercostomus takagii Smirnov & Negrobov, 1979
- Hercostomus tankanus Yang, Saigusa & Masunaga, 2002
- Hercostomus tenebricosus Vaillant, 1973
- Hercostomus thraciensis Kechev & Negrobov, 2015
- Hercostomus thudamanus Yang, Saigusa & Masunaga, 2002
- Hercostomus tianeensis Zhang & Yang, 2003
- Hercostomus tianlinensis Zhang & Yang, 2003
- Hercostomus tibialis (Van Duzee, 1913)
- Hercostomus tiomanensis Zhang, Yang & Grootaert, 2007
- Hercostomus tjibodas (De Meijere, 1916)
- Hercostomus tobiasi Grichanov, 1999
- Hercostomus tomkovichi Grichanov, 2024
- Hercostomus tonguci Naglis & Negrobov, 2017
- Hercostomus transsylvanicus Parvu, 1987
- Hercostomus triseta Yang & Saigusa, 2001
- Hercostomus truncatus Harmston & Knowlton, 1940
- Hercostomus tugajorum Stackelberg, 1949
- Hercostomus tuomunanus Yang & Saigusa, 2001
- Hercostomus turanicola Stackelberg, 1949
- Hercostomus udeorum Stackelberg, 1933
- Hercostomus udovenkovae Negrobov & Logvinovskij, 1977
- Hercostomus ulleriensis Hollis, 1964
- Hercostomus ulrichi Yang, 1996
- Hercostomus unicolor (Loew, 1864)
- Hercostomus uniformis Yang & Saigusa, 2001
- Hercostomus utahensis Harmston & Knowlton, 1940
- Hercostomus uzbekorum Stackelberg, 1933
- Hercostomus vanduzeei (Curran, 1930)
- Hercostomus ventralis Yang & Saigusa, 1999
- Hercostomus verbekei Pollet, 1993
- Hercostomus vikhrevi Grichanov, 2020
- Hercostomus vivax (Loew, 1857)
- Hercostomus vockerothi d'Assis Fonseca, 1976
- Hercostomus vodjanovi Negrobov, Maslova & Selivanova, 2016
- Hercostomus wangi Tang, Pan & Yang, 2016
- Hercostomus wasatchensis Harmston & Knowlton, 1943
- Hercostomus wittei Grichanov, 1999
- Hercostomus wudangshanus Yang, 1997
- Hercostomus wuhongi Yang, 1997
- Hercostomus wui Yang, 1997
- Hercostomus xanthocerus Parent, 1926
- Hercostomus xanthodes Yang & Grootaert, 1999
- Hercostomus xiaolongmensis Yang & Saigusa, 2001
- Hercostomus xigouensis Yang & Saigusa, 2005
- Hercostomus xinjianganus Yang, 1996
- Hercostomus xishuangbannensis Yang & Grootaert, 1999
- Hercostomus xishuiensis Wei & Song, 2005
- Hercostomus xixianus Yang, 1999
- Hercostomus xizangensis Yang, 1996
- Hercostomus yadonganus Yang, 1997
- Hercostomus yakovlevi Grichanov, 1999
- Hercostomus yangi Olejníček, 2003
- Hercostomus yefremovae Grichanov & Freidberg, 2018
- Hercostomus yinshanus Liao, Zhou & Yang, 2009
- Hercostomus yiyanganus Zhang & Yang, 2008
- Hercostomus yongpingensis Yang & Saigusa, 2001
- Hercostomus yunlongensis Yang & Saigusa, 2001
- Hercostomus yunnanensis Wei, 1997
- Hercostomus zhangae Tang, Pan & Yang, 2016
- Hercostomus zhenzhuristi Smirnov & Negrobov, 1979
- Hercostomus zieheni Parent, 1929
- Hercostomus zunyianus Yang & Saigusa, 2001
- Hercostomus zuoshuiensis Yang & Saigusa, 2002
- Hercostomus zygolipes (Grootaert & Meuffels, 2001)

Nomina dubia:

- Hercostomus petulans Parent, 1939 (type lost)

Synonyms:

- Hercostomus tanjusilus Negrobov & Zurikov, 1988: synonym of Hercostomus exarticulatus (Loew, 1857)
- Phalacrosoma briarea Wei & Lu, 1996: synonym of Hercostomus zhenzhuristi Smirnov & Negrobov, 1979
- Phalacrosoma sichuanense Yang & Saigusa, 1999: synonym of Aphalacrosoma modestus (Wei, 1998)

Species transferred to Paraclius:

- Hercostomus panamensis Van Duzee, 1931
- Hercostomus plumitarsis Parent, 1931
- Hercostomus problematicus Parent, 1930

Species transferred to Tachytrechus:

- Hercostomus flavimanus Van Duzee in Curran, 1934

Species moved to other genera:

- Hercostomus appendiculatus (Loew, 1859): moved to Poecilobothrus
- Hercostomus bitinctus Becker, 1922: moved to Gymnopternus
- Hercostomus brevipilosus Yang & Saigusa, 2002: moved to Poecilobothrus, synonym of Poecilobothrus pterostichoides (Stackelberg, 1934)
- Hercostomus brunus Wei, 1997: moved to Poecilobothrus
- Hercostomus cucullus Wei, 1997: moved to Poecilobothrus
- Hercostomus cyaneculus Wei, 1997: moved to Poecilobothrus
- Hercostomus daubichensis Stackelberg, 1933: moved to Gymnopternus
- Hercostomus flaveolus Negrobov & Chalaya, 1987: moved to Poecilobothrus
- Hercostomus geminatus Becker, 1922: moved to Pseudohercostomus
- Hercostomus gregalis Becker, 1922: moved to Gymnopternus
- Hercostomus lii Yang, 1996: moved to Poecilobothrus
- Hercostomus longipilosus Yang & Saigusa, 2001: moved to Poecilobothrus
- Hercostomus luchunensis Yang & Saigusa, 2001: moved to Poecilobothrus
- Hercostomus mentougouensis Zhang, Yang & Grootaert, 2003: moved to Poecilobothrus
- Hercostomus morenae (Strobl, 1899): moved to Ortochile
- Hercostomus nemorum Smirnov & Negrobov, 1977: moved to Gymnopternus
- Hercostomus palustris Wei, 2006: moved to Poecilobothrus
- Hercostomus parvilamellatus (Macquart, 1827): moved to Sybistroma
- Hercostomus parvulus Parent, 1927: moved to Sybistroma
- Hercostomus potanini Stackelberg, 1933: moved to Poecilobothrus
- Hercostomus pterostichoides Stackelberg, 1934: moved to Poecilobothrus
- Hercostomus rohdendorfi Stackelberg, 1933: moved to Gymnopternus
- Hercostomus saetosus Yang & Saigusa, 2002: moved to Poecilobothrus
- Hercostomus singularis Yang & Saigusa, 2001: moved to Poecilobothrus
- †Hercostomus devinctus (Meunier, 1907): moved to Prohercostomus
- †Hercostomus inumbratus (Meunier, 1907): moved to Prohercostomus
- Phalacrosoma hubeiense Yang, 1998: moved to Aphalacrosoma
- Phalacrosoma postiseta Yang & Saigusa, 2001: moved to Aphalacrosoma
- Phalacrosoma zhejiangense Yang, 1997: moved to Poecilobothrus
