= Parahercostomus =

Scientific classification
- Kingdom: Animalia
- Phylum: Arthropoda
- Clade: Pancrustacea
- Class: Insecta
- Order: Diptera
- Family: Dolichopodidae
- Subfamily: Dolichopodinae
- Genus: Parahercostomus; Yang, Saigusa & Masunaga, 2001

Type species
- Hercostomus (Hercostomus) zhongdianus Yang, 1998

Genus of flies

Parahercostomus is a genus of flies in the family Dolichopodidae. It includes four species known only from China. Members of the genus are metallic green in color and large in size, with a body length of 4.5–5.3 mm and a wing length of 5.2–7.0 mm. The generic name is a combination of the prefix para- (from the Ancient Greek παρά, pará, meaning "near" or "beside") with the generic name Hercostomus. According to Brooks (2005)'s phylogenetic analysis of the subfamily Dolichopodinae, Parahercostomus appears to be closely related to Grichanov (1999)'s Afrotropical species group 1 in the genus Hercostomus, which was later transferred to the genus Afrohercostomus.

== Species ==
- Parahercostomus kaulbacki (Hollis, 1964) – Tibet
- Parahercostomus orientalis Yang, Saigusa & Masunaga, 2001 – Yunnan
- Parahercostomus triseta Yang, Saigusa & Masunaga, 2001 – Yunnan
- Parahercostomus zhongdianus (Yang, 1998) – Yunnan
