= Subhercostomus =

Scientific classification
- Kingdom: Animalia
- Phylum: Arthropoda
- Clade: Pancrustacea
- Class: Insecta
- Order: Diptera
- Family: Dolichopodidae
- Tribe: Dolichopodini
- Genus: Neohercostomus
- Subgenus: Subhercostomus; Grichanov, 2011

Type species
- Hercostomus turneri Grichanov, 1999

Subgenus of flies

Subhercostomus is a subgenus of Neohercostomus, a genus of flies in the family Dolichopodidae. The type species, N. turneri, was formerly from "Hercostomus Group III", one of three groups of Afrotropical Hercostomus species created by Igor Grichanov in 1999.

== Species ==
- N. manningi Grichanov, 2011 – South Africa
- N. silvicola Grichanov, 2011 – South Africa
- N. turneri (Grichanov, 1999) – South Africa
