= Platyopsis =

Scientific classification
- Kingdom: Animalia
- Phylum: Arthropoda
- Clade: Pancrustacea
- Class: Insecta
- Order: Diptera
- Family: Dolichopodidae
- Subfamily: Dolichopodinae
- Genus: Platyopsis; Parent, 1929
- Species: P. maroccanus

Binomial name
- Platyopsis maroccanus (Parent, 1929)

Synonyms
- Hercostomus maroccanus Parent, 1929

Genus of flies

Platyopsis is a genus of flies in the family Dolichopodidae. It contains a single species, Platyopsis maroccanus, from Morocco and Algeria. According to a cladistic analysis by Brooks (2005), the genus appears closely related to Stenopygium and Pelastoneurus.
