= Pseudoparaclius =

Scientific classification
- Kingdom: Animalia
- Phylum: Arthropoda
- Clade: Pancrustacea
- Class: Insecta
- Order: Diptera
- Family: Dolichopodidae
- Subfamily: Dolichopodinae
- Genus: Pseudoparaclius; Grichanov, 2006

Type species
- Pelastoneurus brincki Vanschuytbroeck, 1960

Genus of flies

Pseudoparaclius is a genus of flies in the family Dolichopodidae. It was established by Igor Grichanov in 2006, for 14 species from Africa that were originally placed in Paracleius (now a synonym of Pelastoneurus). Two additional species were described in 2015 and 2020.

== Species ==
- Pseudoparaclius afer (Curran, 1936) – ?Kenya, South Africa
- Pseudoparaclius atricornis (Parent, 1934) – Zimbabwe
- Pseudoparaclius brincki (Vanschuytbroeck, 1960) – South Africa
- Pseudoparaclius caudatus (Parent, 1934) – Kenya
- Pseudoparaclius funditor (Curran, 1936) – South Africa
- Pseudoparaclius kabasha (Grichanov, 2004) – DR Congo
- Pseudoparaclius manningi Grichanov, 2020 – South Africa
- Pseudoparaclius maranguensis (Vanschuytbroeck, 1964) – DR Congo, South Africa, Tanzania, Uganda
- Pseudoparaclius miritarsus (Grichanov, 2004) – Angola
- Pseudoparaclius ngarukaensis (Vanschuytbroeck, 1964) – Kenya, South Africa, Tanzania
- Pseudoparaclius obscoenus (Wiedemann, 1830) – South Africa
- Pseudoparaclius ogojaensis (Vanschuytbroeck, 1962) – Nigeria
- Pseudoparaclius sanjensis (Grichanov, 2004) – Tanzania
- Pseudoparaclius udzungwa Kaae, Grichanov & Pape, 2015 – Tanzania
- Pseudoparaclius upembaensis (Grichanov, 2004) – DR Congo
- Pseudoparaclius zogualensis (Grichanov, 2004) – Ivory Coast
