= Anasyntormon =

Scientific classification
- Kingdom: Animalia
- Phylum: Arthropoda
- Clade: Pancrustacea
- Class: Insecta
- Order: Diptera
- Family: Dolichopodidae
- Subfamily: Dolichopodinae
- Genus: Anasyntormon; Dyte, 1975

Type species
- Anasyntormon secundus Parent, 1932

Synonyms
- Anasyntormon Parent, 1932 (unavailable name)

Genus of flies

Anasyntormon is a genus of flies in the family Dolichopodidae. It was originally placed in the subfamily Rhaphiinae near Syntormon. It was transferred to Dolichopodinae by Hans Ulrich (1980), who found it to be congeneric or closely related to Hercostomus.

The genus was originally established by Octave Parent in 1932; however, as he did not designate a type species for it, the name was unavailable until 1975, when C. E. Dyte designated A. secundus as the type species. The holotype specimen of A. exceptus was deposited in the Hungarian Natural History Museum, which was destroyed during the Hungarian Revolution of 1956.

== Species ==
- Anasyntormon exceptus (Becker, 1922) – Taiwan
- Anasyntormon secundus Parent, 1932 – Malaysia, Indonesia
