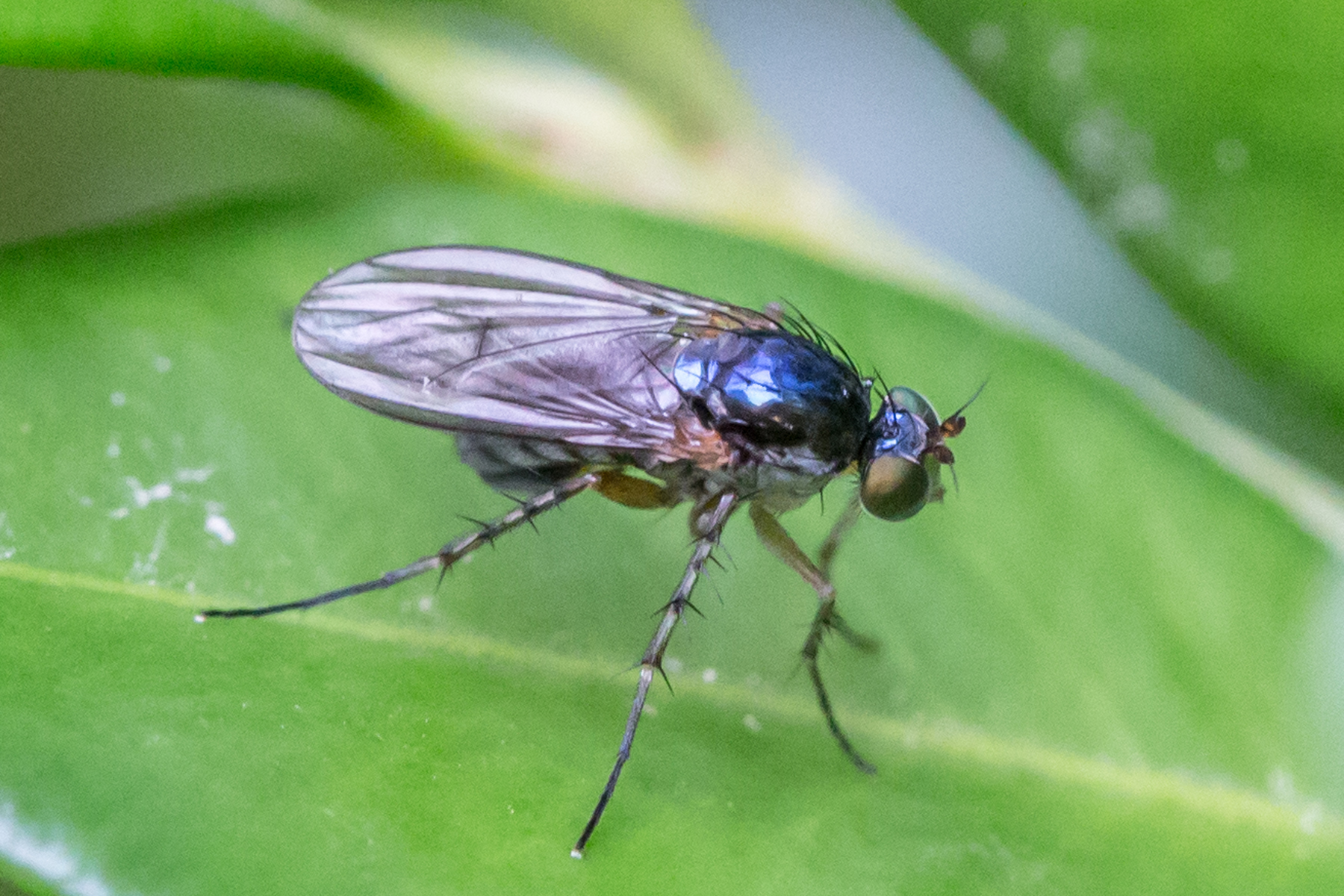
- Ethiromyia violacea

Scientific classification
- Kingdom: Animalia
- Phylum: Arthropoda
- Clade: Pancrustacea
- Class: Insecta
- Order: Diptera
- Family: Dolichopodidae
- Subfamily: Dolichopodinae
- Genus: Ethiromyia; Brooks in Brooks & Wheeler, 2005

Type species
- Hercostomus purpuratus Van Duzee, 1925

= Ethiromyia =

Genus of flies

Ethiromyia is a genus of flies in the family Dolichopodidae. It is distributed in the Holarctic realm. It was established for a group of three species formerly included in Gymnopternus or Hercostomus.

== Species ==
- Ethiromyia chalybea (Wiedemann, 1817) – Europe
- Ethiromyia purpurata (Van Duzee, 1925) – Eastern Nearctic
- Ethiromyia violacea (Van Duzee, 1921) – Eastern Nearctic
