= Ahypophyllus =

Scientific classification
- Kingdom: Animalia
- Phylum: Arthropoda
- Clade: Pancrustacea
- Class: Insecta
- Order: Diptera
- Family: Dolichopodidae
- Subfamily: Dolichopodinae
- Genus: Ahypophyllus; Zhang & Yang, 2005
- Species: A. sinensis

Binomial name
- Ahypophyllus sinensis (Yang, 1996)

Synonyms
- Hypophyllus sinensis Yang, 1996

Genus of flies

Ahypophyllus is a genus of flies in the family Dolichopodidae. It currently contains only one species, Ahypophyllus sinensis, known only from China.

The generic name is derived from the negative prefix "a" and the generic name Hypophyllus.
