= Prohercostomus =

Prohercostomus Temporal range: Eocene, 37.2–33.9 Ma

Scientific classification
- Kingdom: Animalia
- Phylum: Arthropoda
- Clade: Pancrustacea
- Class: Insecta
- Order: Diptera
- Family: Dolichopodidae
- Subfamily: Dolichopodinae
- Genus: †Prohercostomus; Grichanov, 1997

Type species
- †Dolichopus noxialis Meunier, 1907

Synonyms
- Sympycnites Grimaldi & Cumming, 1999

Extinct genus of flies

Prohercostomus is an extinct genus of flies in the family Dolichopodidae, known from Baltic amber and Rovno amber from the Eocene. It was originally established as a subgenus of Hercostomus, but was later raised to genus rank. It includes 13 species described by Fernand Meunier between 1907 and 1908 that were originally placed in the genera Dolichopus, Gymnopternus and Poecilobothrus.

In 1999, a new genus and species Sympycnites primaevus was described from a single female labelled as being from Early Cretaceous-aged Lebanese amber. This was considered unusual, because all other known fossils of Dolichopodidae in its strict sense (excluding the subfamilies Parathalassiinae and Microphorinae) were found in Cenozoic deposits. Dolichopodidae researchers later considered that the amber was probably mislabeled, and placed Sympycnites primaevus in synonymy with Prohercostomus noxialis in 2022.

== Species ==
- †Prohercostomus bickeli (Evenhuis, 1994) (synonym: Dolichopus vulgaris Meunier, 1907) – Baltic amber
- †Prohercostomus ciliatus (Meunier, 1907) – Baltic amber
- †Prohercostomus devinctus (Meunier, 1907) – Baltic amber
- †Prohercostomus gracilis (Meunier, 1907) – Baltic amber
- †Prohercostomus interceptus (Meunier, 1907) – Baltic amber
- †Prohercostomus intremulus (Meunier, 1907) (doubtful) – Baltic amber
- †Prohercostomus inumbratus (Meunier, 1907) (doubtful) – Baltic amber
- †Prohercostomus meunierianus (Evenhuis, 1994) (synonym: Dolichopus notabilis Meunier, 1907) – Baltic amber; Rovno amber
- †Prohercostomus minutus (Meunier, 1907) – Baltic amber
- †Prohercostomus monotonus (Meunier, 1907) – Baltic amber
- †Prohercostomus morbosus (Meunier, 1907) – Baltic amber
- †Prohercostomus negotiosus (Meunier, 1907) – Baltic amber
- †Prohercostomus noxialis (Meunier, 1907) (synonym: Sympycnites primaevus Grimaldi & Cumming, 1999) – Baltic amber; Rovno amber
