= Allohercostomus =

Scientific classification
- Kingdom: Animalia
- Phylum: Arthropoda
- Clade: Pancrustacea
- Class: Insecta
- Order: Diptera
- Family: Dolichopodidae
- Subfamily: Dolichopodinae
- Genus: Allohercostomus; Yang, Saigusa & Masunaga, 2001

Type species
- Hercostomus (Hercostomus) rotundatus Yang & Saigusa, 1999

Genus of flies

Allohercostomus is a genus of flies in the family Dolichopodidae. It includes three species from China and Nepal. Members of the genus are metallic green in color and are small in size, with a body length of 2.5–3.2 mm and a wing length of 2.8–3.4 mm. The generic name is a combination of the prefix allo- (from the Ancient Greek ἄλλος, állos, meaning "other") with the generic name Hercostomus. In Brooks (2005)'s phylogenetic analysis of the subfamily Dolichopodinae, Allohercostomus was hypothesized to be the most basal member of the subfamily based on a triangular depression present on the scutum in front of the scutellum, a plesiomorphy lost in other members of the subfamily. It can also be distinguished from other members of Dolichopodinae by features such as the bottoms of its eyes being contiguous.

== Species ==
- Allohercostomus chinensis Yang, Saigusa & Masunaga, 2001 – China (Yunnan)
- Allohercostomus nepalensis Yang, Saigusa & Masunaga, 2001 – Nepal
- Allohercostomus rotundatus (Yang & Saigusa, 1999) – China (Sichuan, Shaanxi)
