= Afroparaclius =

Scientific classification
- Kingdom: Animalia
- Phylum: Arthropoda
- Clade: Pancrustacea
- Class: Insecta
- Order: Diptera
- Family: Dolichopodidae
- Subfamily: Dolichopodinae
- Genus: Afroparaclius; Grichanov, 2006

Type species
- Paracleius thompsoni Grichanov, 2004

Genus of flies

Afroparaclius is a genus of flies in the family Dolichopodidae. It includes two species from Africa formerly placed in Paracleius (which is now a synonym of Pelastoneurus).

== Species ==
- Afroparaclius didyensis (Grichanov, 2004) – Madagascar, South Africa
- Afroparaclius thompsoni (Grichanov, 2004) – Burundi, DR Congo, Gabon
