= Pseudargyrochlamys =

Scientific classification
- Kingdom: Animalia
- Phylum: Arthropoda
- Clade: Pancrustacea
- Class: Insecta
- Order: Diptera
- Family: Dolichopodidae
- Subfamily: Dolichopodinae
- Genus: Pseudargyrochlamys; Grichanov, 2006

Type species
- Paracleius michaeli Grichanov, 2004

Genus of flies

Pseudargyrochlamys is a genus of flies in the family Dolichopodidae. It was first established by Igor Grichanov in 2006 for four species of Paracleius (now a synonym of Pelastoneurus) from eastern South Africa. A fifth species from South Africa was described in 2020. Members of the genus are restricted to the coast of southern Africa between East London in South Africa and Maputo in Mozambique. The genus is closely related to Argyrochlamys and Phoomyia, which are also found in coastal habitats.

Adults of Pseudargyrochlamys have a non-metallic body coloring; the thorax is either mainly yellow-orange with a black longitudinal stripe, or mainly blackish grey; the abdomen is mostly orange-yellow with black dorsolateral spots.

== Species ==
The genus includes five species:

- Pseudargyrochlamys barracloughi (Grichanov, 2004) – South Africa: KwaZulu-Natal (Kosi Bay)
- Pseudargyrochlamys jasoni (Grichanov, 2004) – South Africa: KwaZulu-Natal (Kosi Bay); Mozambique
- Pseudargyrochlamys londti Grichanov, 2020 – South Africa: KwaZulu-Natal (uMhlali river)
- Pseudargyrochlamys michaeli (Grichanov, 2004) – South Africa: KwaZulu-Natal (St Lucia), Eastern Cape (Umngazi river mouth)
- Pseudargyrochlamys umngazi (Grichanov, 2004) – South Africa: Eastern Cape (Umngazi river mouth)
