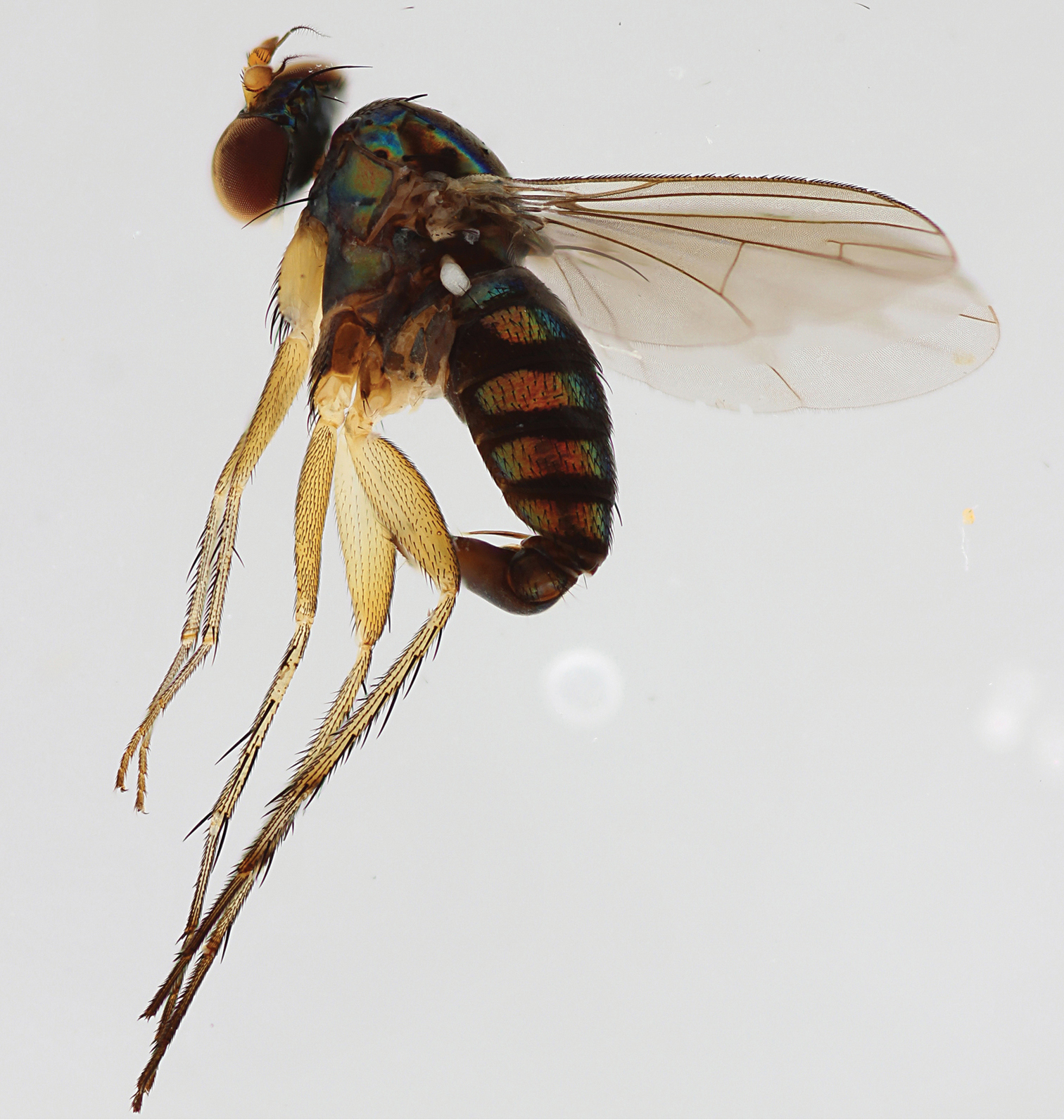
- Lichtwardtia formosana

Scientific classification
- Kingdom: Animalia
- Phylum: Arthropoda
- Clade: Pancrustacea
- Class: Insecta
- Order: Diptera
- Family: Dolichopodidae
- Subfamily: Dolichopodinae
- Genus: Lichtwardtia; Enderlein, 1912

Type species
- Lichtwardtia formosana Enderlein, 1912

Synonyms
- Rhagoneurus Loew, 1864; Vaalimyia Curran, 1926

= Lichtwardtia =

Genus of flies

Lichtwardtia is a genus of flies in the family Dolichopodidae. It is known from the Afrotropical, Oriental and Australasian realms. It can be recognised by its zigzag-shaped M vein on the wings, and its feather-like hairs on the apex segment of the antennae. In a phylogenetic analysis of the subfamily Dolichopodinae by Scott E. Brooks in 2005, Lichtwardtia is considered to be a synonym of Dolichopus, but subsequent authors have retained it as a valid genus.

== Species ==
- Lichtwardtia aethiopica (Bezzi, 1906)
- Lichtwardtia aldabrensis Meuffels & Grootaert, 2007
- Lichtwardtia angularis (Macquart, 1842)
- Lichtwardtia angulicornis Grichanov, 2004
- Lichtwardtia cambodiensis Tang & Grootaert, 2018
- Lichtwardtia clypeata Grichanov, 2004
- Lichtwardtia conspicabilis Tang & Grootaert, 2018
- Lichtwardtia dentalis Zhang, Masunaga & Yang, 2009
- Lichtwardtia dianaensis Grichanov, 2019
- Lichtwardtia emelyanovi Grichanov, 1998
- Lichtwardtia formosana Enderlein, 1912
- Lichtwardtia fractinervis (Parent, 1929)
- Lichtwardtia ghanaensis Grichanov, 2019
- Lichtwardtia guineensis Grichanov & Dubrovskiy, 2024
- Lichtwardtia hilgerae Grichanov, 2004
- Lichtwardtia hirsutiseta (De Meijere, 1916)
- Lichtwardtia hollisi Grichanov, 1998
- Lichtwardtia infuscata Tang & Grootaert, 2018
- Lichtwardtia maculata (Parent, 1936)
- Lichtwardtia melanesiana (Bickel, 2008)
- Lichtwardtia microlepis (Parent, 1939)
- Lichtwardtia minuscula (Parent, 1934)
- Lichtwardtia mironovi Grichanov, 1998
- Lichtwardtia monstruosa Tang & Grootaert, 2018
- Lichtwardtia moseikoi Grichanov, 2020
- Lichtwardtia musolini Grichanov, 2019
- Lichtwardtia nabozhenkoi Grichanov, 2020
- Lichtwardtia nigrifacies Grichanov, 2004
- Lichtwardtia nigrotorquata (Parent, 1937)
- Lichtwardtia nikitai Grichanov, 2019
- Lichtwardtia nikolaevae Grichanov, 1998
- Lichtwardtia nodulata Grootaert & Tang, 2018
- Lichtwardtia oromiaensis Grichanov, 2019
- Lichtwardtia polychroma (Loew, 1864)
- Lichtwardtia semakau Grootaert & Tang, 2018
- Lichtwardtia singaporensis Grootaert & Tang, 2018
- Lichtwardtia sukharevae Grichanov, 1998
- Lichtwardtia tikhonovi Grichanov, 1998
- Lichtwardtia zhangae Tang & Grootaert, 2018

The following species are considered nomina dubia:

- Lichtwardtia coxalis (Kertész, 1901)
- Lichtwardtia ziczac (Wiedemann, 1824)

Lichtwardtia taiwanensis Zhang, Masunaga & Yang, 2009 is a synonym of L. formosana Enderlein, 1912.
