= Setihercostomus =

Scientific classification
- Kingdom: Animalia
- Phylum: Arthropoda
- Clade: Pancrustacea
- Class: Insecta
- Order: Diptera
- Family: Dolichopodidae
- Subfamily: Dolichopodinae
- Genus: Setihercostomus; Zhang & Yang, 2005

Type species
- Hercostomus zonalis Yang, Yang & Li, 1998

Genus of flies

Setihercostomus is a genus of flies in the family Dolichopodidae, known from China, Taiwan, Russia and Tanzania.

The generic name is derived from the Greek prefix seti- and the generic name Hercostomus.

== Species ==
There are currently five species in the genus:

- Setihercostomus huangi (Zhang, Yang & Masunaga, 2004)
- Setihercostomus scharffi (Grichanov, 1999)
- Setihercostomus setifacies (Stackelberg, 1934)
- Setihercostomus taiwanensis Zhang & Yang, 2011
- Setihercostomus wuyangensis (Wei, 1997)

Setihercostomus zonalis (Yang, Yang & Li, 1998) is a synonym of S. wuyangensis (Wei, 1997).
