= Afropelastoneurus =

Scientific classification
- Kingdom: Animalia
- Phylum: Arthropoda
- Clade: Pancrustacea
- Class: Insecta
- Order: Diptera
- Family: Dolichopodidae
- Subfamily: Dolichopodinae
- Genus: Afropelastoneurus; Grichanov, 2006

Type species
- Paracleius martius Grichanov, 2004

Genus of flies

Afropelastoneurus is a genus of flies in the family Dolichopodidae. It includes five species from Africa formerly placed in Paracleius or Pelastoneurus (the former is now a synonym of the latter).

== Species ==
- Afropelastoneurus fernandopoensis (Grichanov, 2004) – Equatorial Guinea (Bioko)
- Afropelastoneurus irinae (Grichanov, 2004) – DR Congo
- Afropelastoneurus martius (Grichanov, 2004) – DR Congo
- Afropelastoneurus pontifex (Parent, 1937) – DR Congo
- Afropelastoneurus umbricola (Parent, 1936) – DR Congo
