= Pseudopelastoneurus =

Scientific classification
- Kingdom: Animalia
- Phylum: Arthropoda
- Clade: Pancrustacea
- Class: Insecta
- Order: Diptera
- Family: Dolichopodidae
- Subfamily: Dolichopodinae
- Genus: Pseudopelastoneurus; Grichanov, 2006

Type species
- Pelastoneurus diversifemur Parent, 1935

Genus of flies

Pseudopelastoneurus is a genus of flies in the family Dolichopodidae. It includes two African species that were formerly classified in the genus Pelastoneurus.

== Species ==
- Pseudopelastoneurus diversifemur (Parent, 1935) – Angola, Cameroon, Central African Republic, DR Congo, Equatorial Guinea (Bioko), Gabon, Ghana, Guinea, Ivory Coast, Kenya, Sierra Leone, Uganda
- Pseudopelastoneurus diversipes (Parent, 1934) – Sierra Leone, Cameroon
