= Paraclius quadrinotatus =

Scientific classification
- Kingdom: Animalia
- Phylum: Arthropoda
- Clade: Pancrustacea
- Class: Insecta
- Order: Diptera
- Family: Dolichopodidae
- Genus: Paraclius
- Species: P. quadrinotatus

Binomial name
- Paraclius quadrinotatus Aldrich, 1902

Species of fly

Paraclius quadrinotatus is a species of long-legged fly in the family Dolichopodidae.
