= Ahercostomus =

Scientific classification
- Kingdom: Animalia
- Phylum: Arthropoda
- Clade: Pancrustacea
- Class: Insecta
- Order: Diptera
- Family: Dolichopodidae
- Subfamily: Dolichopodinae
- Genus: Ahercostomus; Yang & Saigusa, 2001
- Species: A. jiangchenganus

Binomial name
- Ahercostomus jiangchenganus (Yang & Saigusa, 2001)

Synonyms
- Hercostomus (Ahercostomus) jiangchenganus Yang & Saigusa, 2001

Genus of flies

Ahercostomus is a genus of flies in the family Dolichopodidae. It currently contains only one species, Ahercostomus jiangchenganus, known only from China. Ahercostomus was originally created as a subgenus of Hercostomus; it was later promoted to genus rank by Zhang & Yang (2005). Alternatively, Brook (2005) provisionally regards Ahercostomus as a synonym of Hercostomus.

The specific name refers to the type locality, Jiangcheng, which is located in the Yunnan province of China.
