= Katangaia =

Scientific classification
- Kingdom: Animalia
- Phylum: Arthropoda
- Class: Insecta
- Order: Diptera
- Family: Dolichopodidae
- Subfamily: incertae sedis
- Genus: Katangaia; Parent, 1933

Type species
- Katangaia longifacies Parent, 1933

Genus of flies

Katangaia is an African genus of flies in the family Dolichopodidae. It was originally placed in the subfamily Rhaphiinae, though it was later transferred to Dolichopodinae. In 2005, based on a cladistic analysis of the subfamily, Scott E. Brooks excluded Katangaia from the Dolichopodinae. However, Grichanov (2012) retains the genus in this subfamily.

== Species ==
- Katangaia ethiopiensis (Grichanov, 2004) – Ethiopia
- Katangaia longifacies Parent, 1933 – Democratic Republic of the Congo, possibly Tanzania
- Katangaia mulanjensis (Grichanov, 2004) - Malawi
- Katangaia tanzaniensis Grichanov, 2012 – Tanzania
