= Aphalacrosoma =

Scientific classification
- Kingdom: Animalia
- Phylum: Arthropoda
- Clade: Pancrustacea
- Class: Insecta
- Order: Diptera
- Family: Dolichopodidae
- Subfamily: Dolichopodinae
- Genus: Aphalacrosoma; Zhang & Yang, 2005

Type species
- Phalacrosoma postiseta Yang & Saigusa, 2001

Genus of flies

Aphalacrosoma is a genus of flies in the family Dolichopodidae, known from China and Taiwan.

The generic name is derived from the negative prefix "a" and the generic name Phalacrosoma.

== Species ==
There are currently seven species in the genus:

- Aphalacrosoma absarista (Wei, 1998)
- Aphalacrosoma crypsum (Wei, 1998)
- Aphalacrosoma crypsusoideum (Wei, 1998)
- Aphalacrosoma hubeiense (Yang, 1998)
- Aphalacrosoma modestum (Wei, 1998)
- Aphalacrosoma postiseta (Yang & Saigusa, 2001)
- Aphalacrosoma taiwanense Zhang, Yang & Masunaga, 2005

Aphalacrosoma sichuanense (Yang & Saigusa, 1999) is a synonym of A. modestus (Wei, 1998).
