= Srilankamyia =

Scientific classification
- Kingdom: Animalia
- Phylum: Arthropoda
- Clade: Pancrustacea
- Class: Insecta
- Order: Diptera
- Family: Dolichopodidae
- Subfamily: Dolichopodinae
- Genus: Srilankamyia; Naglis, Grootaert & Wei, 2011

Type species
- Srilankamyia argyrata Naglis, Grootaert & Wei, 2011

Genus of flies

Srilankamyia is a genus of flies belonging to the family Dolichopodidae. The genus derives its name from Sri Lanka, where the type species was originally collected. Species of this genus are also found in South China and Laos.

== Species ==
- Srilankamyia argyrata Naglis, Grootaert & Wei, 2011 – Sri Lanka
- Srilankamyia dividifolia Wei, 2013 – China (Guizhou)
- Srilankamyia guizhouensis (Wei, 1997) – China (Guizhou)
- Srilankamyia lianmengi (Olejníček, 2003) – Laos
- Srilankamyia proctus (Wei, 1997) – China (Guizhou)
- Srilankamyia prolixa (Wei, 1997) – China (Guizhou)
