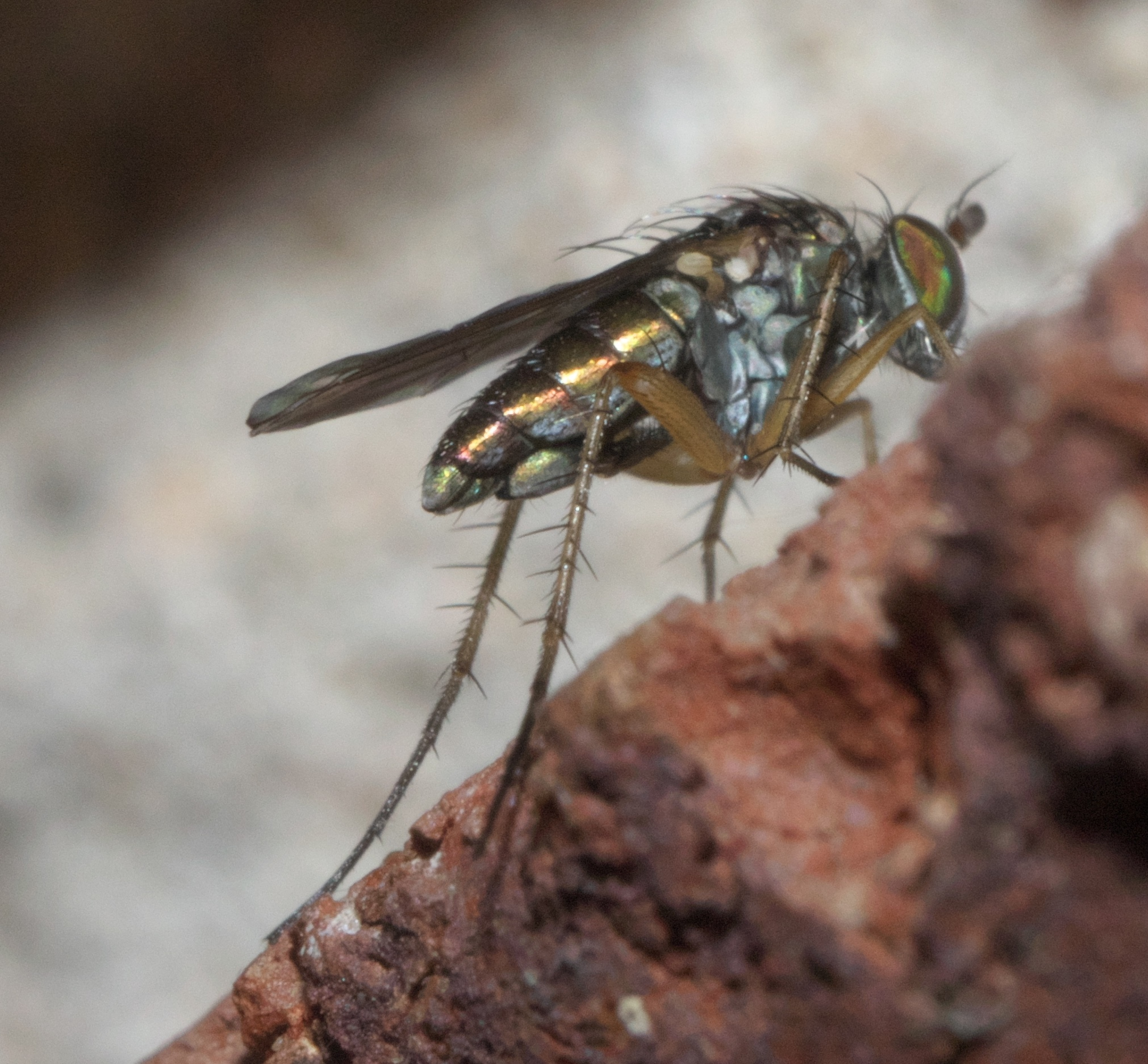
- Pelastoneurus vagans, Oklahoma

Scientific classification
- Kingdom: Animalia
- Phylum: Arthropoda
- Clade: Pancrustacea
- Class: Insecta
- Order: Diptera
- Family: Dolichopodidae
- Genus: Pelastoneurus
- Species: P. vagans

Binomial name
- Pelastoneurus vagans Loew, 1861

Synonyms
- Pelastoneurus longilamellatus Parent, 1929

= Pelastoneurus vagans =

Species of fly

Pelastoneurus vagans is a species of long-legged fly in the family Dolichopodidae.
