= Metaparaclius =

Scientific classification
- Kingdom: Animalia
- Phylum: Arthropoda
- Clade: Pancrustacea
- Class: Insecta
- Order: Diptera
- Family: Dolichopodidae
- Subfamily: Dolichopodinae
- Genus: Metaparaclius; Becker, 1922

Type species
- Metaparaclius subapicalis Becker, 1922

Genus of flies

Metaparaclius is a genus of flies in the family Dolichopodidae. It is known from Papua New Guinea and Australia. The systematic position and monophyly of the genus are currently ambiguous: the holotype specimen of the type species, Metaparaclius subapicalis, was deposited in the Hungarian Natural History Museum, which was destroyed during the Hungarian Revolution of 1956, and no other specimens of this species are currently known.

== Species ==
- Metaparaclius australiensis Parent, 1941 – northern Australia
- Metaparaclius subapicalis Becker, 1922 – New Guinea
