= Argyrochlamys =

Scientific classification
- Kingdom: Animalia
- Phylum: Arthropoda
- Clade: Pancrustacea
- Class: Insecta
- Order: Diptera
- Family: Dolichopodidae
- Subfamily: Dolichopodinae
- Genus: Argyrochlamys; Lamb, 1922

Type species
- Argyrochlamys impudicus Lamb, 1922

Synonyms
- Halaiba Parent, 1929; Camptoneura Parent, 1930

Genus of flies

Argyrochlamys is a genus of flies in the family Dolichopodidae. It is known from the Afrotropics, the Oriental realm, and the southernmost part of the Palearctic realm. The genus is closely related to the genera Pseudargyrochlamys and Phoomyia. Species of Argyrochlamys are restricted to ocean beaches, and are usually collected in the burrows of ghost crabs. Their ecological role within these burrows is currently unknown. Adults of Argyrochlamys have a non-metallic dull body color, ranging from pale yellowish brown to dark grey.

== Species ==
- Argyrochlamys angolensis Grichanov, 2004 – Angola
- Argyrochlamys breviseta (Parent, 1939) – Ghana
- Argyrochlamys cavicola (Parent, 1929) – Sudan, Djibouti, southern Egypt, Oman
- Argyrochlamys decolor (Parent, 1930) – Mauritius (Tamarind Falls)
- Argyrochlamys erythreus Grichanov, 2004 – Eritrea
- Argyrochlamys hajiesmaeiliani Grichanov & Gilasian, 2023 – Iran, Oman
- Argyrochlamys impudicus Lamb, 1922 – Seychelles, Mauritius, Sri Lanka, Chagos Archipelago, India (Gujarat), Oman, Iran
- Argyrochlamys marshalli Grichanov, 2010 – Tanzania
- Argyrochlamys nigrescens Grichanov & Gilasian, 2023 – Iran
- Argyrochlamys tomkovichi Grichanov in Grichanov & Gilasian, 2023 – Oman
