= Ortochile =

Scientific classification
- Kingdom: Animalia
- Phylum: Arthropoda
- Clade: Pancrustacea
- Class: Insecta
- Order: Diptera
- Family: Dolichopodidae
- Subfamily: Dolichopodinae
- Genus: Ortochile; Latreille, 1809

Type species
- Ortochile nigrocoerulea Latreille, 1809

Synonyms
- Orthochile Blanchard, 1845 (unjustified emendation); Orthochile Westwood, 1840 (unjustified emendation)

Genus of flies

Ortochile is a genus of flies in the family Dolichopodidae. It is distributed in the Western Palaearctic realm, including Europe, Turkey, Israel and North Africa. Adults of Ortochile have greatly elongated mouthparts, longer than the height of the head. They are associated with flowers, and have been reported to feed on nectar and pollen. Flower-feeding is also known in some species of Hercostomus.

== Species ==
Four species are included in the genus:

- Ortochile barbicoxa Strobl, 1909 – Spain
- Ortochile morenae (Strobl, 1899) – Morocco, Spain
- Ortochile nigrocoerulea Latreille, 1809 – West and South Europe, North Africa, Middle East
- Ortochile soccata Loew, 1850 – France, Italy, Malta
