= Keirosoma =

- Keirosoma slossonae

Scientific classification
- Kingdom: Animalia
- Phylum: Arthropoda
- Clade: Pancrustacea
- Class: Insecta
- Order: Diptera
- Family: Dolichopodidae
- Subfamily: Diaphorinae
- Genus: Keirosoma; Van Duzee, 1929

Type species
- Keirosoma albicinctum Van Duzee, 1929

Genus of flies

Keirosoma is a genus of flies in the family Dolichopodidae. It is distributed in the New World. The subfamily has variously been placed in the Rhaphiinae, Diaphorinae or Sympycninae. According to Scott E. Brooks in 2005, the systematic position of the genus is still uncertain, though a possible relationship with Pseudohercostomus has been suggested.

== Species ==
- Keirosoma albicinctum Van Duzee, 1929 – Panama, Costa Rica, Puerto Rico
- Keirosoma slossonae Van Duzee, 1933 – Florida, Maryland
