= Pelastoneurus longicauda =

Scientific classification
- Kingdom: Animalia
- Phylum: Arthropoda
- Clade: Pancrustacea
- Class: Insecta
- Order: Diptera
- Family: Dolichopodidae
- Genus: Pelastoneurus
- Species: P. longicauda

Binomial name
- Pelastoneurus longicauda Loew, 1861

Synonyms
- Pelastoneurus quadricincta Van Duzee, 1928

Species of fly

Pelastoneurus longicauda is a species of long-legged fly in the family Dolichopodidae.
