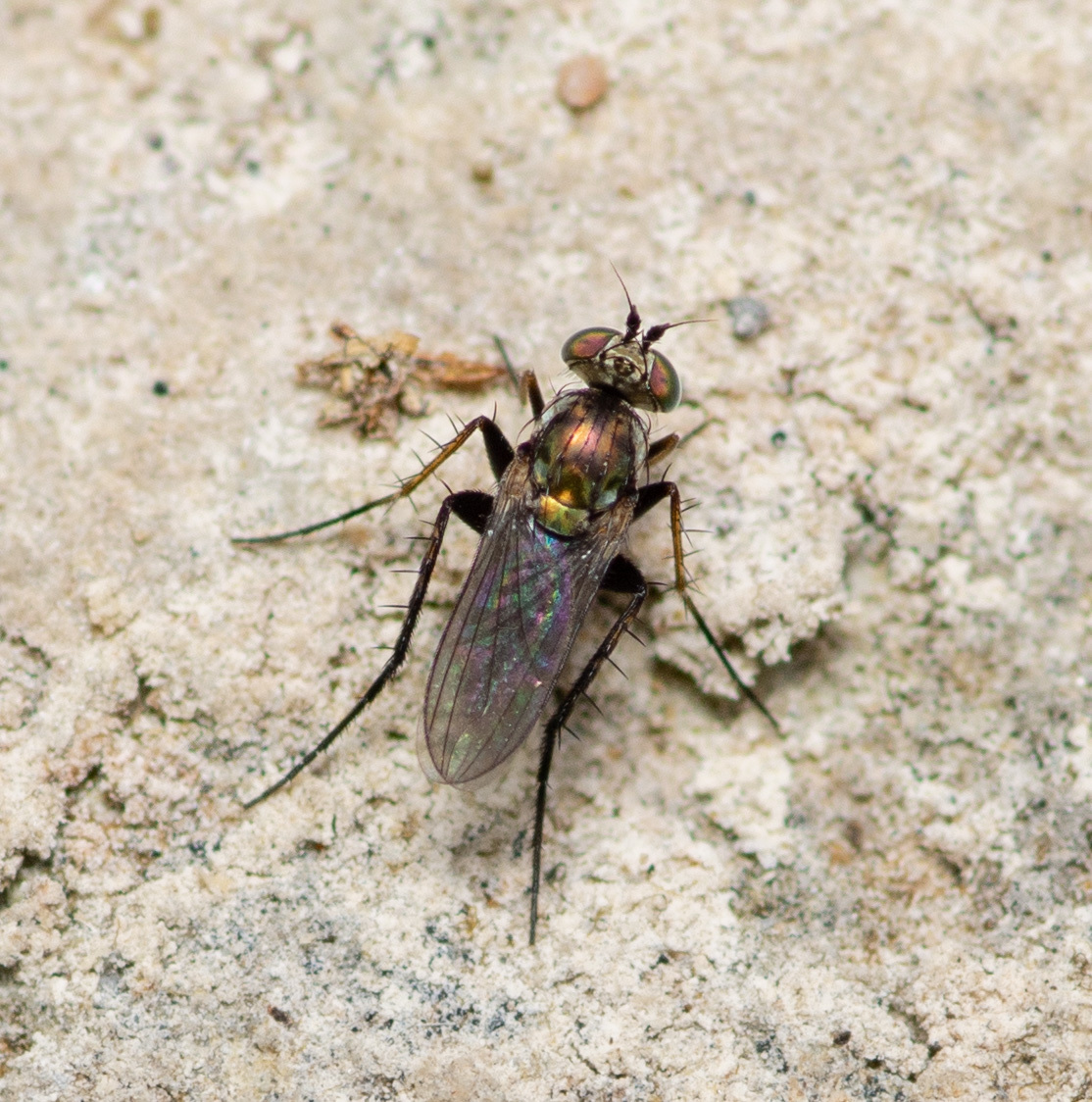
- Paraclius pumilio

Scientific classification
- Kingdom: Animalia
- Phylum: Arthropoda
- Clade: Pancrustacea
- Class: Insecta
- Order: Diptera
- Family: Dolichopodidae
- Subfamily: Dolichopodinae
- Tribe: Tachytrechini
- Genus: Paraclius; Loew, 1864

Type species
- Pelastoneurus arcuatus Loew, 1861

Synonyms
- Leptocorypha Aldrich, 1896

= Paraclius =

Genus of flies

Paraclius is a genus of flies in the family Dolichopodidae. It is currently considered a polyphyletic assemblage of species.

== Species ==
- Paraclius abbreviatus Becker, 1922
- Paraclius aberrans Robinson, 1964
- Paraclius acutatus Yang & Li, 1998
- Paraclius acuticornis Van Duzee, 1929
- Paraclius adligatus Becker, 1922
- Paraclius aeotearoa Bickel, 2008
- Paraclius affinis Robinson, 1975
- Paraclius albimanus Van Duzee, 1929
- Paraclius albisignatus Parent, 1928
- Paraclius albodivisus Parent, 1941
- Paraclius alternans (Loew, 1864)
- Paraclius amazonae Parent, 1929
- Paraclius americanus (Schiner, 1868)
- Paraclius amphiatheratus Capellari & Amorim, 2009
- Paraclius angusticauda Van Duzee, 1933
- Paraclius angustipennis Van Duzee, 1929
- Paraclius apicalis Parent, 1954
- Paraclius arcuatus (Loew, 1861)
- Paraclius argentatus Parent, 1934
- Paraclius argenteus Negrobov, 1984
- Paraclius asiobates Zhang, Yang & Grootaert, 2007
- Paraclius australiensis Parent, 1933
- Paraclius basiflavus Yang, 1998
- Paraclius bilamellatus Soares, Capellari & Ale-Rocha, 2023
- Paraclius brevicornis Van Duzee, 1931
- Paraclius brevimanus Van Duzee, 1931
- Paraclius breviventris Van Duzee, 1931
- Paraclius brooksi Soares, Runyon, Capellari & Ale-Rocha, 2023
- Paraclius cataractus Bickel, 2008
- Paraclius cilipes Hardy, 1939
- Paraclius claviculatus Loew, 1866
- Paraclius consors (Walker, 1852)
- Paraclius coxalis Van Duzee, 1933
- Paraclius crassatus Zhang, Yang & Grootaert, 2007
- Paraclius curvispinus Yang & Saigusa, 2001
- Paraclius desenderi Bickel & Sinclair, 1997
- Paraclius dicrophallus Capellari & Amorim, 2009
- Paraclius difficilis Becker, 1922
- Paraclius digitatus Zhang, Yang & Grootaert, 2007
- Paraclius discifer Aldrich, 1902
- Paraclius discophorus Parent, 1933
- Paraclius dominicensis Robinson, 1975
- Paraclius dorsalis Becker, 1922
- Paraclius edwardsi Van Duzee, 1931
- Paraclius electus (Walker, 1856)
- Paraclius elongatus Van Duzee, 1930
- Paraclius emeiensis Yang & Saigusa, 1999
- Paraclius eximius Van Duzee, 1931
- Paraclius fanjingensis Wei, 2006
- Paraclius filifer Aldrich, 1896
- Paraclius flagellatus (Harmston, 1952)
- Paraclius flavicauda Van Duzee, 1931
- Paraclius flavipes (Aldrich, 1901)
- Paraclius floridensis Robinson, 1964
- Paraclius furcatus Yang & Saigusa, 2001
- Paraclius fuscinervis Frey, 1925
- Paraclius germanus Parent, 1935
- Paraclius grootaerti Olejníček, 2003
- Paraclius hebes Van Duzee, 1923
- Paraclius hybridus Melander, 1900
- Paraclius incisus Yang & Grootaert, 1999
- Paraclius inopinatus (Parent, 1934)
- Paraclius interductus Becker, 1922
- Paraclius japonensis Negrobov, Kumazawa & Tago in Negrobov, Kumazawa, Tago & Maslova, 2014
- Paraclius koghis Bickel, 2008
- Paraclius kovasci Parent, 1933
- Paraclius laevis Becker, 1922
- Paraclius latifacies Hardy, 1939
- Paraclius latipes (Aldrich, 1896)
- Paraclius leucopilus (Loew, 1857)
- Paraclius lii Wei & Song, 2005
- Paraclius limitatus Wei & Song, 2005
- Paraclius longicercus Yang & Grootaert, 1999
- Paraclius longicornis Van Duzee, 1931
- Paraclius longicornutus Yang & Saigusa, 1999
- Paraclius longus Zhang, Yang & Grootaert, 2007
- Paraclius luculentus Parent, 1932
- Paraclius maculatus De Meijere, 1916
- Paraclius mandjelia Bickel, 2008
- Paraclius manglar Bickel, 2013
- Paraclius maritimus Van Duzee, 1923
- Paraclius mastrus Wei, 2006
- Paraclius matilorum Bickel, 2008
- Paraclius mecynus Wei & Song, 2005
- Paraclius megalocerus Robinson, 1975
- Paraclius melicus Wei, 2006
- Paraclius menglunensis Yang & Grootaert, 1999
- Paraclius micropygus Parent, 1931
- Paraclius minutus Van Duzee, 1921
- Paraclius mixtus Parent, 1934
- Paraclius modestus Parent, 1934
- Paraclius monteithi Bickel, 2008
- Paraclius neglectus Becker, 1922
- Paraclius nigrocaudatus Van Duzee, 1918
- Paraclius nigroterminalis Van Duzee, 1931
- Paraclius norrbomi Soares, Capellari & Ale-Rocha, 2023
- Paraclius nudus Becker, 1922
- Paraclius obscurus Van Duzee, 1931
- Paraclius obtus Zhang, Yang & Grootaert, 2007
- Paraclius obtusus Hardy, 1939
- Paraclius oedipus Becker, 1922
- Paraclius opulentus Van Duzee, 1930
- Paraclius ornatipes Parent, 1932
- Paraclius paita Bickel, 2008
- Paraclius panamensis (Van Duzee, 1931)
- Paraclius paraguayensis Parent, 1931
- Paraclius parenti Capellari & Amorim, 2009
- Paraclius parvulus Parent, 1930
- Paraclius pavo (Aldrich, 1896)
- Paraclius pendleburyi Parent, 1935
- Paraclius peruanus Becker, 1922
- Paraclius pictipes Becker, 1922
- Paraclius pilosellus Becker, 1922
- Paraclius pinguis Parent, 1935
- Paraclius planitarsis Zhang, Yang & Masunaga, 2004
- Paraclius plumensis Bickel, 2008
- Paraclius plumicornis Van Duzee, 1931
- Paraclius plumitarsis (Parent, 1931)
- Paraclius polychaetus Zhang, Yang & Grootaert, 2007
- Paraclius potamus Bickel, 2008
- Paraclius problematicus (Parent, 1930)
- Paraclius propinquus Wheeler, 1899
- Paraclius provectus (Walker, 1859)
- Paraclius pumilio Loew, 1872
- Paraclius quadrimaculatus Bezzi, 1928
- Paraclius quadrinotatus Aldrich, 1902
- Paraclius regularis Becker, 1922
- Paraclius ruficornis (Aldrich, 1896)
- Paraclius sagittatus Capellari & Amorim, 2009
- Paraclius sarcionoides Robinson, 1975
- Paraclius scutopilosus Parent, 1941
- Paraclius septentrionalis Negrobov, 1980
- Paraclius serratus Zhang, Yang & Grootaert, 2007
- Paraclius serrulatus Yang & Grootaert, 1999
- Paraclius setifemoratus Parent, 1937
- Paraclius sexmaculatus Bezzi, 1928
- Paraclius siamensis Parent, 1941
- Paraclius simplex Van Duzee, 1929
- Paraclius sinclairi Bickel, 2008
- Paraclius sinensis Yang & Li, 1998
- Paraclius singaporensis Zhang, Yang & Grootaert, 2007
- Paraclius sordidus Van Duzee, 1933
- Paraclius spinuliger Parent, 1933
- Paraclius stipiatus Yang, 1999
- Paraclius strictifacies Parent, 1939
- Paraclius stylatus Becker, 1922
- Paraclius subarcuatus Bezzi, 1928
- Paraclius subincisus Zhang, Yang & Masunaga, 2006
- Paraclius taiwanensis Zhang, Yang & Masunaga, 2006
- Paraclius tenuinervis Parent, 1935
- Paraclius trigonifer (Walker, 1858)
- Paraclius trisetosus Parent, 1933
- Paraclius variegatus Negrobov, Kumazawa & Tago in Negrobov, Kumazawa, Tago & Maslova, 2014
- Paraclius ventralis Lin, Dong & Yang, 2021
- Paraclius venustus Aldrich, 1901
- Paraclius vicarius (Walker, 1865)
- Paraclius viridus Van Duzee, 1931
- Paraclius vulcanoae Soares, Capellari & Ale-Rocha, 2023
- Paraclius wutongshanus Lin, Dong & Yang, 2021
- Paraclius xanthocercus Yang & Grootaert, 1999
- Paraclius xanthurus Bickel, 2008
- Paraclius xibun Soares, Runyon, Capellari & Ale-Rocha, 2023
- Paraclius yongpinganus Yang & Saigusa, 2001
- Paraclius yunnanensis Yang, 1996

Synonyms:

- Paraclius darwini Parent, 1933: synonym of Paraclius sexmaculatus Bezzi, 1928
- Paraclius diplacocerus Capellari, 2013: synonym of Paraclius americanus (Schiner, 1868)
- Paraclius femoratus Aldrich, 1901: synonym of Paraclius arcuatus (Loew, 1861)
- Paraclius formosus Parent, 1931: synonym of Tachytrechus longiciliatus (Van Duzee, 1931)
- Paraclius maculifer Parent, 1939: synonym of Paraclius sexmaculatus Bezzi, 1928
- Paraclius maculipennis (Van Duzee, 1934): synonym of Paraclius problematicus (Parent, 1930)
- Paraclius magnicornis Van Duzee, 1927: synonym of Paraclius pumilio Loew, 1872
- Paraclius ovatus Van Duzee, 1914: synonym of Paraclius venustus Aldrich, 1901
- Paraclius praedicans (Walker, 1860): moved to Pelastoneurus
