= Neohercostomus =

Scientific classification
- Kingdom: Animalia
- Phylum: Arthropoda
- Clade: Pancrustacea
- Class: Insecta
- Order: Diptera
- Family: Dolichopodidae
- Subfamily: Dolichopodinae
- Tribe: Dolichopodini
- Genus: Neohercostomus; Grichanov, 2011

Type species
- Hercostomus strictilamellatus Parent, 1937

Genus of flies

Neohercostomus is a genus of flies in the family Dolichopodidae. Many of the species were formerly from "Hercostomus Group III", one of three groups of Afrotropical Hercostomus species created by Igor Grichanov in 1999.

== Species ==
The genus is divided into two subgenera, Neohercostomus and Subhercostomus:

Subgenus Neohercostomus Grichanov, 2011:

- N. arzanovi Grichanov, 2011 – Gabon
- N. ashleyi Grichanov, 2011 – DR Congo
- N. duviardi (Couturier, 1978) – Ivory Coast, DR Congo, Uganda, Gabon
- N. garambensis (Grichanov, 2004) – DR Congo
- N. itineris (Grichanov, 2004) – Cameroon
- N. krivokhatskii (Grichanov, 1999) – DR Congo, Central African Republic
- N. laanmae (Grichanov, 1999) – Tanzania, Gabon
- N. lictor (Parent, 1937) – Nigeria, Cameroon, Ivory Coast, DR Congo
- N. minimus (Parent, 1937) – DR Congo
- N. ovchinnikovae (Grichanov, 1999) – DR Congo, Ivory Coast
- N. panteleevae (Grichanov, 1999) – DR Congo
- N. pseudolictor (Grichanov, 2004) – Guinea, Ivory Coast
- N. rezniki (Grichanov, 2004) – Cameroon, Ivory Coast
- N. rodionovae Grichanov, 2011 – South Africa
- N. selivanovae Grichanov, 2011 – South Africa
- N. storozhenkoi Grichanov, 2011 – Gabon
- N. strictilamellatus (Parent, 1937) – DR Congo
- N. transitorius (Parent, 1934) – DR Congo

Subgenus Subhercostomus Grichanov, 2011:

- N. manningi Grichanov, 2011 – South Africa
- N. silvicola Grichanov, 2011 – South Africa
- N. turneri (Grichanov, 1999) – South Africa
