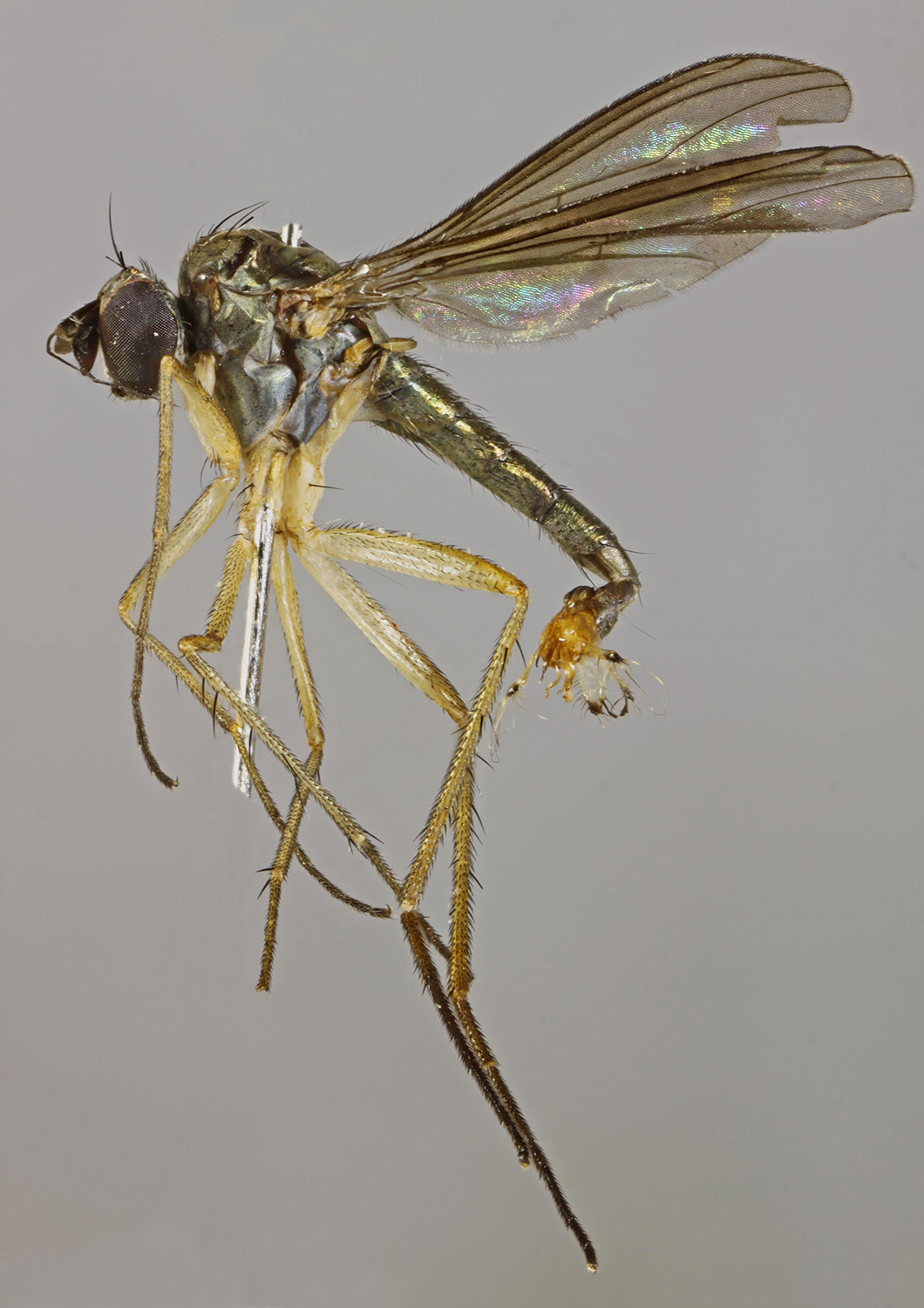
- Sybistroma obscurellum North Wales

Scientific classification
- Kingdom: Animalia
- Phylum: Arthropoda
- Clade: Pancrustacea
- Class: Insecta
- Order: Diptera
- Family: Dolichopodidae
- Genus: Sybistroma
- Species: S. obscurellum

Binomial name
- Sybistroma obscurellum (Fallén, 1823)

Synonyms
- Dolichopus obscurellus Fallén, 1823; Dolichopus xanthogaster Meigen, 1824; Hypophyllus appendiculatus (Macquart, 1827); Hypophyllus obscurellus (Fallén, 1823); Hypophyllus xanthogaster (Meigen, 1824); Medetera appendiculata Macquart, 1827; Sybistroma appendiculata (Macquart, 1827); Sybistroma xanthogaster (Meigen, 1824); Teuchophorus xanthogaster (Meigen, 1824)

= Sybistroma obscurellum =

Species of fly

Sybistroma obscurellum is a species of fly in the family Dolichopodidae. It is found in the Palearctic. The specific epithet obscurellum is also sometimes spelled as obscurella or obscurellus, depending on what grammatical gender the genus Sybistroma is interpreted to have.
