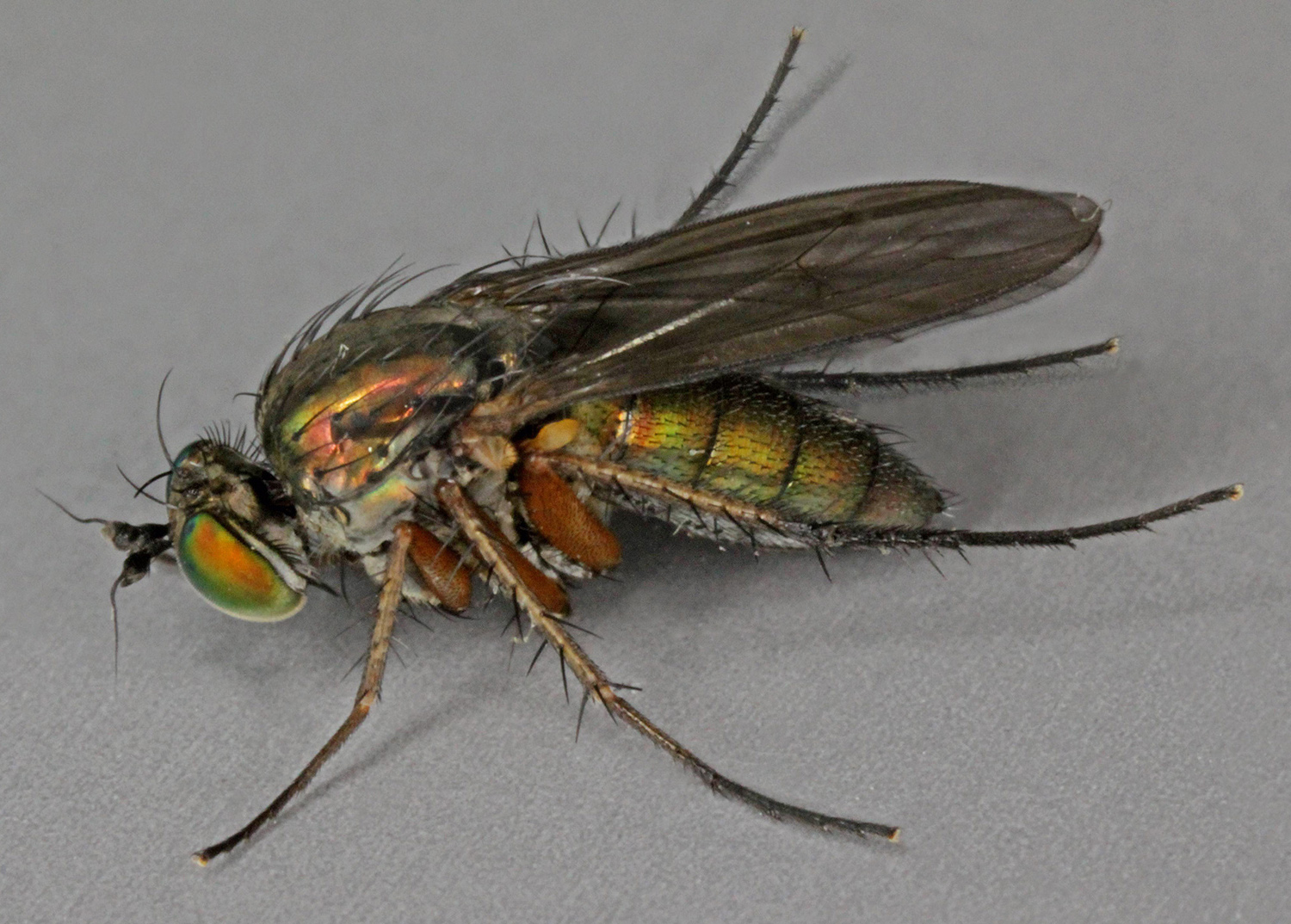

Scientific classification
- Kingdom: Animalia
- Phylum: Arthropoda
- Clade: Pancrustacea
- Class: Insecta
- Order: Diptera
- Family: Dolichopodidae
- Genus: Dolichopus
- Species: D. ungulatus

Binomial name
- Dolichopus ungulatus (Linnaeus, 1758)

Synonyms
- Musca ungulata Linnaeus, 1758; Nemotelus aeneus De Geer, 1776; Dolichopus aeneus (De Geer, 1776); Dolichopus bifurcatus Macquart, 1827; Dolichopus subungulatus Stackelberg, 1930

= Dolichopus ungulatus =

Species of fly

Dolichopus ungulatus is a European species of fly in the family Dolichopodidae.

== Gallery ==
Dolichopus ungulatus on Urtica
