= Phoomyia =

Scientific classification
- Kingdom: Animalia
- Phylum: Arthropoda
- Clade: Pancrustacea
- Class: Insecta
- Order: Diptera
- Family: Dolichopodidae
- Subfamily: Dolichopodinae
- Genus: Phoomyia; Naglis & Grootaert, 2013

Type species
- Phoomyia srilankensis Naglis & Grootaert, 2013

Genus of flies

Phoomyia is a genus of flies in the family Dolichopodidae. The genus is known from the coasts of Sri Lanka, Thailand and East India, and is closely related to Argyrochlamys and Pseudargyrochlamys. Species of Phoomyia appear to be restricted to sandy ocean beaches, where they are often found near the burrows of ghost crabs.

Adults of Phoomyia have a body length of 2.0–3.5 mm. Their bodies have a non-metallic coloring with dense grey pruinosity, and their legs are yellow.

The generic name Phoomyia is a combination of Phoo, derived from the Thai word ปู ("crab"), and myia, derived from the Greek word μυία ("fly").

== Species ==
The genus includes two species:

- Phoomyia srilankensis Naglis & Grootaert, 2013 – Sri Lanka (Southern, Eastern, Western and Northern provinces); East India (Gop, Odisha)
- Phoomyia thailandensis Naglis & Grootaert, 2013 – Thailand (Chonburi and Rayong provinces)
