= Muscidideicus =

Scientific classification
- Kingdom: Animalia
- Phylum: Arthropoda
- Clade: Pancrustacea
- Class: Insecta
- Order: Diptera
- Family: Dolichopodidae
- Subfamily: Dolichopodinae
- Genus: Muscidideicus; Becker, 1917
- Species: M. praetextatus

Binomial name
- Muscidideicus praetextatus (Haliday, 1855)

Synonyms
- Dolichopus praetextatus Haliday, 1855; Gymnopternus praetextatus (Haliday, 1855); Hercostomus marginatus Lichtwardt, 1896; Hercostomus praetextatus (Haliday, 1855); Muscidideicus marginatus (Lichtwardt, 1896); Tachytrechus praetextatus (Haliday, 1855)

Genus of flies

Muscidideicus is a genus of flies in the family Dolichopodidae. It contains a single species, Muscidideicus praetextatus, which is found only in the Western Palaearctic.
