= Pseudohercostomus =

Scientific classification
- Kingdom: Animalia
- Phylum: Arthropoda
- Clade: Pancrustacea
- Class: Insecta
- Order: Diptera
- Family: Dolichopodidae
- Subfamily: incertae sedis
- Genus: Pseudohercostomus; Stackelberg, 1931

Type species
- Pseudohercostomus echinatus Stackelberg, 1931

Genus of flies

Pseudohercostomus is a genus of flies in the family Dolichopodidae. It is distributed in the Oriental and Afrotropical realms as well as Chile.

Historically, the genus has generally been placed in the subfamily Dolichopodinae. In 2005, based on a cladistic analysis of the subfamily, Scott E. Brooks excluded Pseudohercostomus from the Dolichopodinae. The systematic position of the genus is still unclear, though a possible relationship with the New World genus Keirosoma has been suggested.

== Species ==
The genus contains six species:

- Pseudohercostomus allini Negrobov, 1988 – Chile
- Pseudohercostomus congoensis Grootaert & Van de Velde, 2021 – DR Congo; Mozambique
- Pseudohercostomus echinatus Stackelberg, 1931 – Java, Indonesia
- Pseudohercostomus geminatus (Becker, 1922) – India; Bangladesh
- Pseudohercostomus sinensis Yang & Grootaert, 1999 – China (Yunnan)
- Pseudohercostomus singaporensis Grootaert & Van de Velde, 2021 – Singapore; Cambodia
