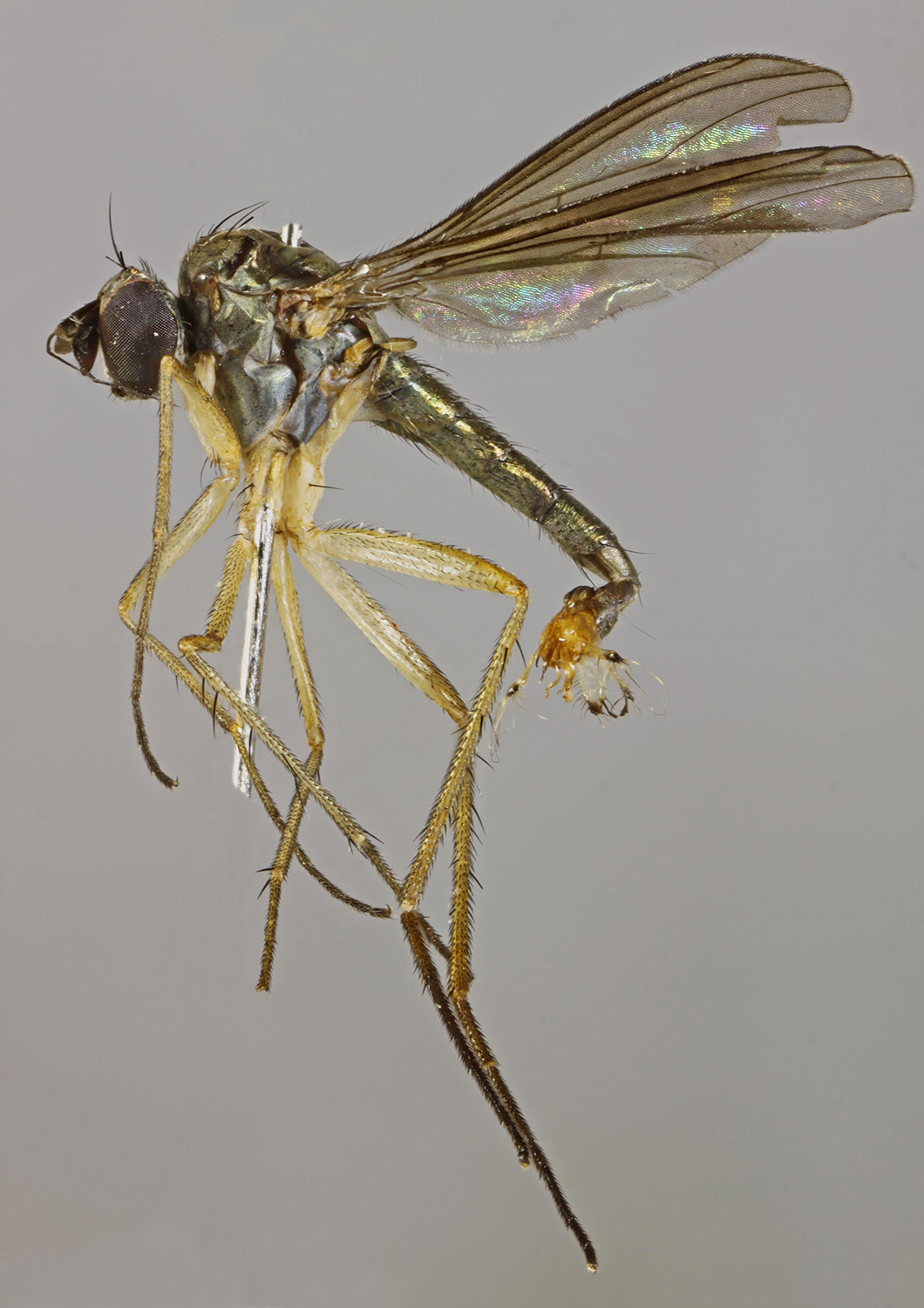
- Sybistroma obscurellum North Wales

Scientific classification
- Kingdom: Animalia
- Phylum: Arthropoda
- Class: Insecta
- Order: Diptera
- Family: Dolichopodidae
- Subfamily: Dolichopodinae
- Genus: Sybistroma; Meigen, 1824

Type species
- Dolichopus discipes Germar, 1817

Synonyms
- Hypophyllus Haliday, 1832; Ludovicius Rondani, 1843; Nodicornis Rondani, 1843; Haltericerus Rondani, 1856; Nemospathus Bigot, 1859; Ozodostylus Bigot, 1859; Dasyarthrus Mik, 1878; Sibistroma Rondani, 1856 (unjustified emendation); Spathitarsis Bigot, 1888

= Sybistroma =

Genus of flies

Sybistroma is a genus of flies in the family Dolichopodidae. It includes over 50 species, described mainly from the Palaearctic and Oriental realms. A single species is known from the Afrotropical realm. Until 2005, the genus was thought to be restricted to the Mediterranean in distribution, with five known species. It was recently expanded to include the former genera Hypophyllus, Ludovicius and Nodicornis, as well as some species of Hercostomus.

== Species ==
The following species are included in the genus: (Note: Under the International Code of Zoological Nomenclature, Article 30, the genus Sybistroma must have neuter gender, as the name ending "-stroma" is from the Ancient Greek στρῶμα, meaning "bed". Because of this, neuter name endings are used in this list. Alternatively, Grichanov and Kazerani (2014) have argued that Sybistroma has feminine gender, because Meigen originally included the species "Sybistroma nodicornis" (rather than neuter "nodicorne"), and subsequent authors described species in the genus with feminine endings. This would mean that any species names that are declinable adjectives would instead have feminine endings, e.g. "caudata" instead of "caudatum", "obscurella" instead of "obscurellum", etc.)

- Sybistroma acutatum (Yang, 1996)
- Sybistroma angustum (Yang & Saigusa, 2005)
- Sybistroma apicicrassum (Yang & Saigusa, 2001)
- Sybistroma apicilare (Yang, 1999)
- Sybistroma biaristatum (Yang, 1999)
- Sybistroma binigrum (Yang & Saigusa, 1999)
- Sybistroma binodicorne Stackelberg, 1941
- Sybistroma bogoria (Grichanov, 2004)
- Sybistroma brevidigitatum (Yang & Saigusa, 2001)
- Sybistroma caudatum (Loew, 1859)
- Sybistroma clarum (Negrobov & Onishchenko, 1991)
- Sybistroma compressum (Yang & Saigusa, 2001)
- Sybistroma crinipes Staeger, 1842
- Sybistroma curvatum (Yang, 1998)
- Sybistroma digitiforme (Yang, Yang & Li, 1998)
- Sybistroma discipes (Germar, 1817)
- Sybistroma dorsale (Yang, 1996)
- Sybistroma dufouri Macquart, 1838
- Sybistroma emeishanum (Yang, 1998)
- Sybistroma eucerum (Loew, 1861)
- Sybistroma fanjingshanum (Yang, Grootaert & Song, 2002)
- Sybistroma flavum (Yang, 1996)
- Sybistroma gansuense (Yang & Saigusa, 2005)
- Sybistroma genriki Grichanov, 2020
- Sybistroma golanicum (Grichanov, 2000)
- Sybistroma henanum (Yang, 1996)
- Sybistroma impar (Rondani, 1843)
- Sybistroma incisum (Yang, 1999)
- Sybistroma inornatum (Loew, 1857)
- Sybistroma israelense (Grichanov, 2000)
- Sybistroma latifacies (Yang & Saigusa, 2005)
- Sybistroma lenkoranicum Negrobov, 1979
- Sybistroma leptocercus (Stackelberg, 1949)
- Sybistroma longaristatum (Yang & Saigusa, 1999)
- Sybistroma longidigitatum (Yang & Saigusa, 2001)
- Sybistroma loriferum (Mik, 1878)
- Sybistroma luteicorne (Parent, 1944)
- Sybistroma maerens Loew, 1873
- Sybistroma miricorne (Parent, 1926)
- Sybistroma neixianganum (Yang, 1999)
- Sybistroma nodicorne Wiedemann, 1824
- Sybistroma obscurellum (Fallén, 1823)
- Sybistroma occidasiaticum Grichanov & Kazerani, 2014
- Sybistroma paradoxopterum (Stackelberg, 1949)
- Sybistroma parvilamellatum (Macquart, 1827)
- Sybistroma parvulum (Parent, 1927)
- Sybistroma qinlingense (Yang & Saigusa, 2001)
- Sybistroma schachti Naglis, 2011
- Sybistroma sciophilum (Loew, 1869)
- Sybistroma setosum Schiner, 1861
- Sybistroma sheni (Yang & Saigusa, 1999)
- Sybistroma sichuanense (Yang, 1998)
- Sybistroma sinaiense (Grichanov, 2000)
- Sybistroma songshanense (Yang & Saigusa, 2005)
- Sybistroma spectabile (Parent, 1928)
- Sybistroma sphenopterum (Loew, 1859)
- Sybistroma theodori Grichanov & Nourti, 2021
- Sybistroma transcaucasicum (Stackelberg, 1941)
- Sybistroma yunnanense (Yang, 1998)
