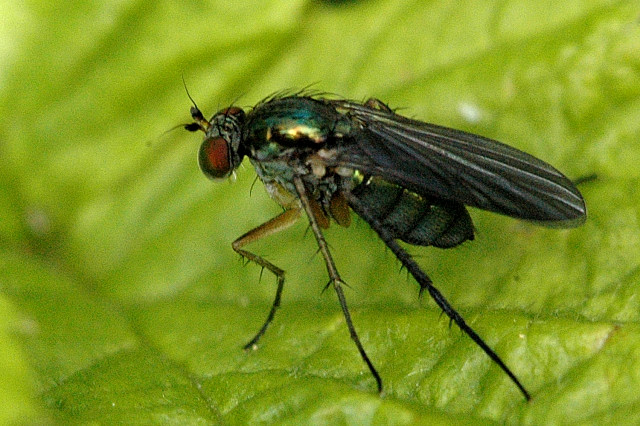
- Dolichopus urbanus

Scientific classification
- Kingdom: Animalia
- Phylum: Arthropoda
- Clade: Pancrustacea
- Class: Insecta
- Order: Diptera
- Family: Dolichopodidae
- Subfamily: Dolichopodinae; Latreille, 1809

Genera
- see text

= Dolichopodinae =

Subfamily of flies

Dolichopodinae is a subfamily of flies in the family Dolichopodidae. It is recognised by the antennae having setae on the top side of the scape (the first segment of the antennae), the femora of the middle and hind legs having setae on the front side near the apex, and the male postabdomen (the terminal segments of the abdomen containing the anal and genital segments) usually being large, forming a peduncle and folded underneath the abdomen.

== Systematics ==
The subfamily Dolichopodinae is divided into two tribes, Dolichopodini and Tachytrechini, in Negrobov (1986, 1991). In Brooks (2005)'s phylogenetic analysis of the subfamily, these tribes are not supported, and four informal generic groups are instead recognised.

The following list of genera generally follows Grichanov (2017):

- Allohercostomus Yang, Saigusa & Masunaga, 2001
- Katangaia Parent, 1933 (Dolichopodinae or incertae sedis)
- †Prohercostomus Grichanov, 1997
- Pseudohercostomus Stackelberg, 1931 (Dolichopodinae or incertae sedis)
- Rhinoceromyia Grichanov, 2024
- Tribe Dolichopodini Latreille, 1809
  - Afrohercostomus Grichanov, 2010
  - Ahercostomus Yang & Saigusa, 2001
  - Ahypophyllus Zhang & Yang, 2005
  - Anasyntormon Dyte, 1975
  - Dolichopus Latreille, 1796
  - Ethiromyia Brooks in Brooks & Wheeler, 2005
  - Gymnopternus Loew, 1857
  - Hercostomus Loew, 1857
  - Lichtwardtia Enderlein, 1912
  - Neohercostomus Grichanov, 2011
    - Neohercostomus Grichanov, 2011
    - Subhercostomus Grichanov, 2011
  - Ortochile Latreille, 1809
  - Parahercostomus Yang, Saigusa & Masunaga, 2001
  - Poecilobothrus Mik, 1878
  - Setihercostomus Zhang & Yang, 2005
  - Srilankamyia Naglis, Grootaert & Wei, 2011
  - Sybistroma Meigen, 1824
- Tribe Tachytrechini Negrobov, 1986
  - Afroparaclius Grichanov, 2006
  - Afropelastoneurus Grichanov, 2006
  - Apelastoneurus Grichanov, 2006
  - Aphalacrosoma Zhang & Yang, 2005
  - Argyrochlamys Lamb, 1922
  - Cheiromyia Dyte, 1980
  - Metaparaclius Becker, 1922
  - Muscidideicus Becker, 1917
  - Paraclius Loew, 1864
  - Pelastoneurus Loew, 1861
  - Phoomyia Naglis & Grootaert, 2013
  - Platyopsis Parent, 1929
  - Pseudargyrochlamys Grichanov, 2006
  - Pseudoparaclius Grichanov, 2006
  - Pseudopelastoneurus Grichanov, 2006
  - Stenopygium Becker, 1922
  - Tachytrechus Haliday in Walker, 1851

Several extinct genera were described from Eocene amber near Fushun, China by Hong Youchong in 2002, but all except Leptodolichopodites and Fushuniregis (formerly Wangia) are considered unavailable names because no type repositories were specified for any of the new species described in Hong's work:

- †Arpactodolichopodites Hong, 2002 (unavailable name)
  - †A. eocenicus Hong, 2002 (unavailable name)
- †Convexivertex Hong, 2002 (unavailable name)
  - †C. viridulus Hong, 2002 (unavailable name)
- †Eoeuryopterites Hong, 2002 (unavailable name)
  - †E. floricopulatus Hong, 2002 (unavailable name)
  - †E. fushunensis Hong, 2002 (unavailable name)
- †Fushuniregis Evenhuis in Evenhuis & Bickel, 2021 (formerly Wangia Hong, 2002, junior homonym of Wangia Fowler, 1954)
  - †F. trichopoda (Hong, 1981)
- †Leptodolichopodites Hong, 2002
  - †L. longiflagellatus (Hong, 1981)
- †Orbicapitis Hong, 2002 (unavailable name)
  - †O. borealis Hong, 2002 (unavailable name)
