= Stenopygium =

Scientific classification
- Kingdom: Animalia
- Phylum: Arthropoda
- Clade: Pancrustacea
- Class: Insecta
- Order: Diptera
- Family: Dolichopodidae
- Subfamily: Dolichopodinae
- Genus: Stenopygium; Becker, 1922

Type species
- Stenopygium nubeculum Becker, 1922

Genus of flies

Stenopygium is a genus of flies in the family Dolichopodidae. It contains two species which are found in the Neotropical realm, and is related to Pelastoneurus.

== Species ==
- Stenopygium nubeculum Becker, 1922 – Bolivia, Peru
- Stenopygium punctipennis (Say, 1829) – Mexico, Costa Rica, Bolivia
