= Afrohercostomus =

Scientific classification
- Kingdom: Animalia
- Phylum: Arthropoda
- Clade: Pancrustacea
- Class: Insecta
- Order: Diptera
- Family: Dolichopodidae
- Subfamily: Dolichopodinae
- Tribe: Dolichopodini
- Genus: Afrohercostomus; Grichanov, 2010

Type species
- Hercostomus straeleni Vanschuytbroeck, 1951

Genus of flies

Afrohercostomus is a genus of flies in the family Dolichopodidae. Many of the species were formerly from "Hercostomus Group I" (or the "Hercostomus" straeleni group), one of three groups of Afrotropical Hercostomus species created by Igor Grichanov in 1999.

== Species ==
- Afrohercostomus afer (Rondani, 1873) – Ethiopia
- Afrohercostomus argyropus (Loew, 1858)
  - Afrohercostomus argyropus argyropus (Loew, 1858) – Botswana, Lesotho, Malawi, Namibia, South Africa, Zimbabwe
  - Afrohercostomus argyropus par (Parent, 1934) – Angola, Botswana, Burundi, DR Congo, Kenya, Malawi, Namibia, Rwanda, Tanzania, Uganda
- Afrohercostomus blagoderovi (Grichanov, 1999) – Kenya
- Afrohercostomus caprivi (Grichanov, 2004) – Namibia
- Afrohercostomus congoensis (Curran, 1925) – Burundi, DR Congo, Kenya, Uganda
- Afrohercostomus dimidiatus (Curran, 1939) – Zimbabwe
- Afrohercostomus eronis (Curran, 1926) – Burundi, ?Madagascar, South Africa, Tanzania
- Afrohercostomus golubtsovi (Grichanov, 1999) – Uganda
- Afrohercostomus jani (Dyte, 1957) – Cameroon, DR Congo, Malawi, Tanzania
- Afrohercostomus natalensis Grichanov, 2010 – South Africa
- Afrohercostomus rhodesiensis (Parent, 1939) – Zimbabwe
- Afrohercostomus straeleni (Vanschuytbroeck, 1951) – DR Congo, Uganda
- Afrohercostomus stuckenbergi Grichanov, 2010 – Lesotho, South Africa
- Afrohercostomus ultimus (Parent, 1935) – DR Congo, Kenya
