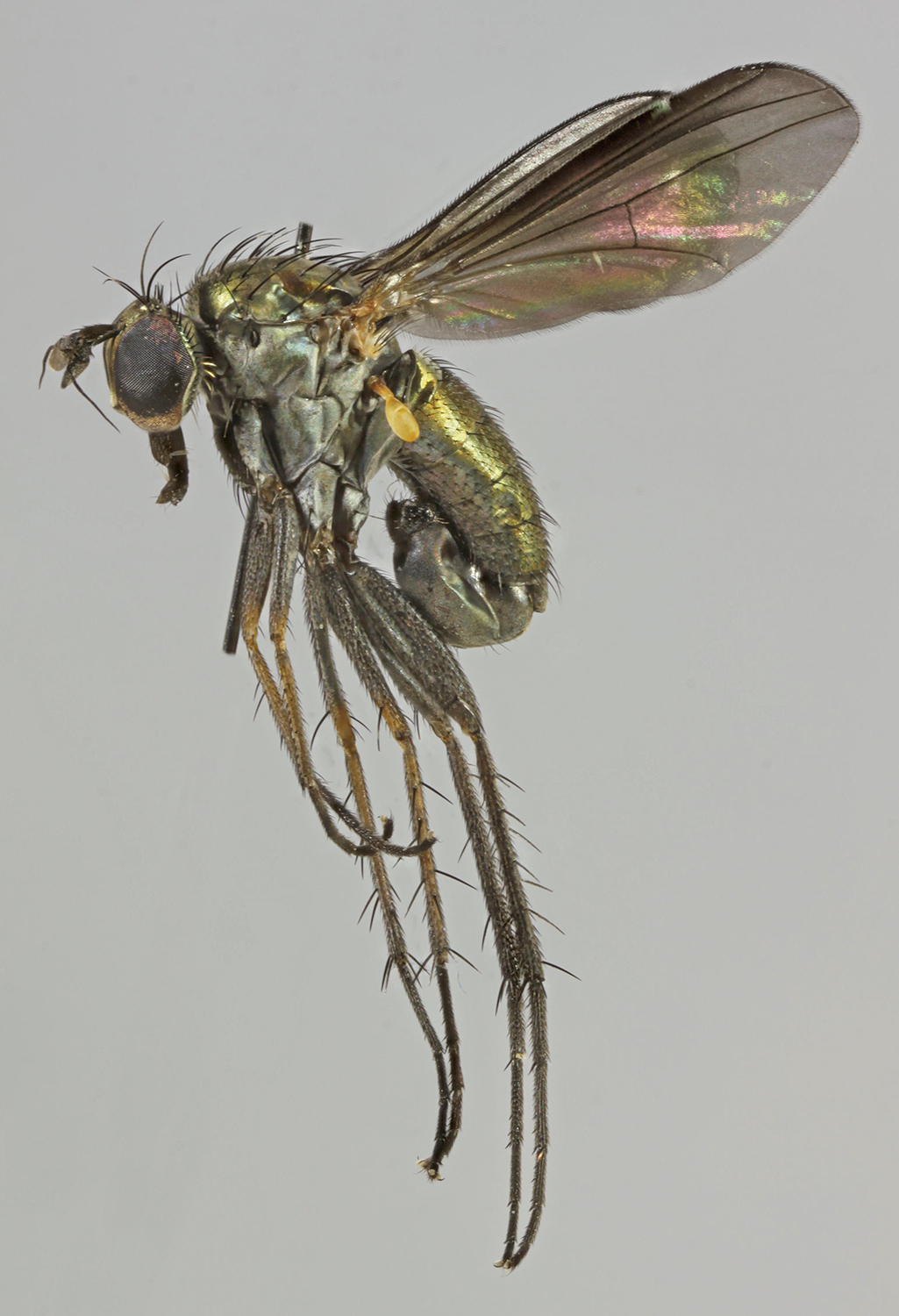
- Hercostomus nigripennis North Wales

Scientific classification
- Kingdom: Animalia
- Phylum: Arthropoda
- Clade: Pancrustacea
- Class: Insecta
- Order: Diptera
- Family: Dolichopodidae
- Genus: Hercostomus
- Species: H. nigripennis

Binomial name
- Hercostomus nigripennis (Fallen, 1823)

Synonyms
- Dolichopus nigripennis Fallen, 1823

= Hercostomus nigripennis =

Species of fly

Hercostomus nigripennis is a species of fly in the family Dolichopodidae. It is found in the Palearctic.
