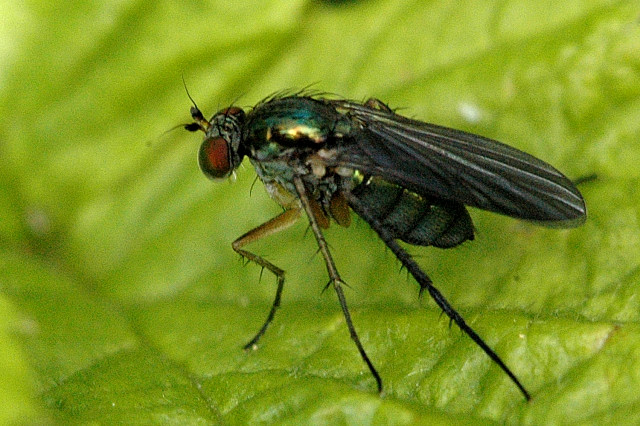
- Dolichopus urbanus

Scientific classification
- Kingdom: Animalia
- Phylum: Arthropoda
- Class: Insecta
- Order: Diptera
- Family: Dolichopodidae
- Subfamily: Dolichopodinae
- Tribe: Dolichopodini
- Genus: Dolichopus; Latreille, 1796

Type species
- Musca ungulata Linnaeus, 1758

Synonyms
- Iphis Meigen, 1800 (suppressed name); Satyra Meigen, 1803; Ragheneura Rondani, 1856; Hygroceleuthus Loew, 1857; Spathichira Bigot, 1888; Spatichira Bigot, 1888; Eudolichopus Frey, 1915; Leucodolichopus Frey, 1915; Melanodolichopus Frey, 1915; Hydroceleuthus Aldrich, 1921 (misspelling); Macrodolichopus Stackelberg, 1933

= Dolichopus =

Genus of flies

Dolichopus is a large cosmopolitan genus of flies in the family Dolichopodidae. Adults are small flies, typically less than 8 mm in length. Nearly all species are metallic greenish-blue to greenish-bronze. It is the largest genus of Dolichopodidae with more than 600 species worldwide.

The name of the genus (δολιχός, long, and ποὺς, foot) refers to the length of the feet of its species.

== Gallery ==
Dolichopus sp. female with prey (video, 1m 23s)

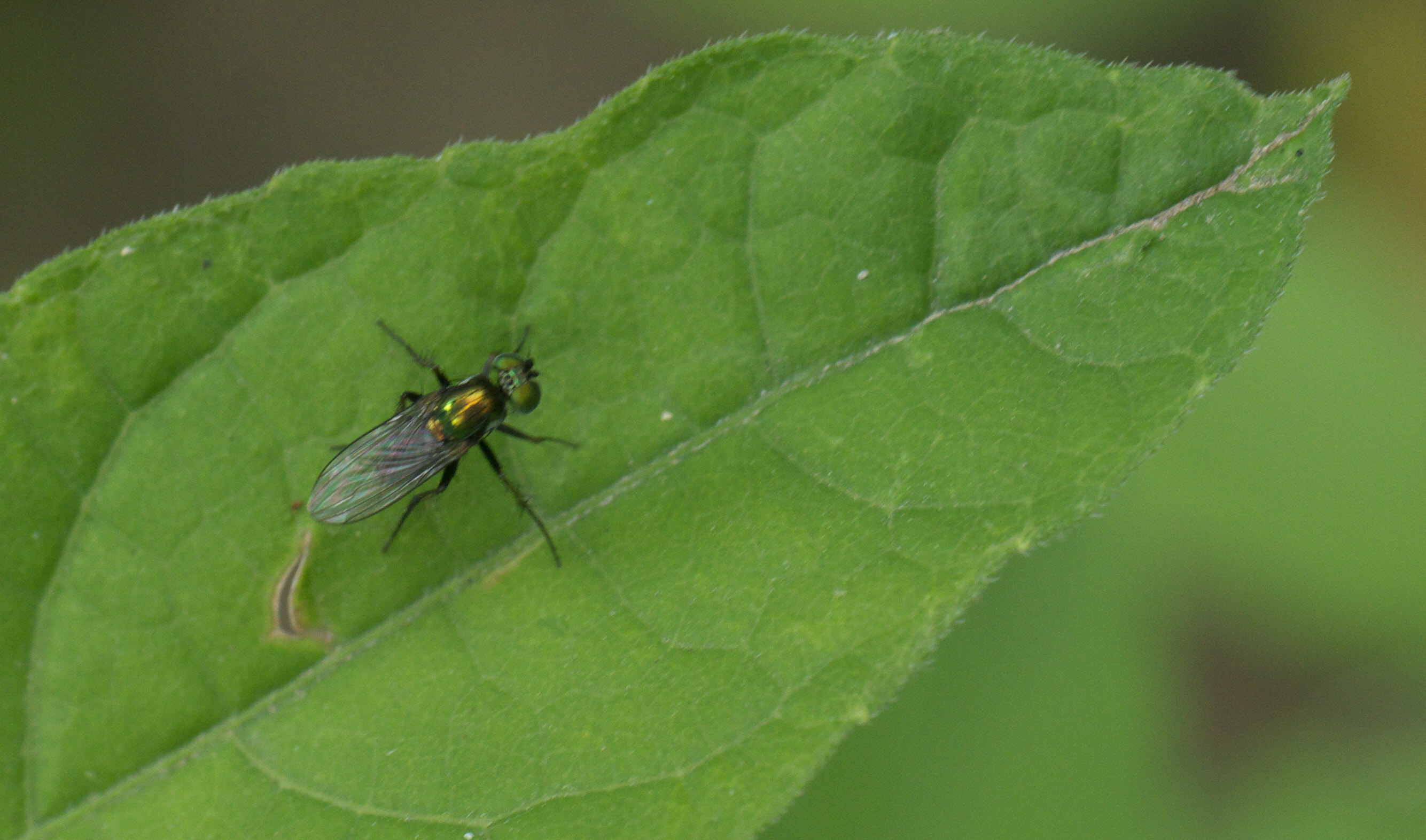

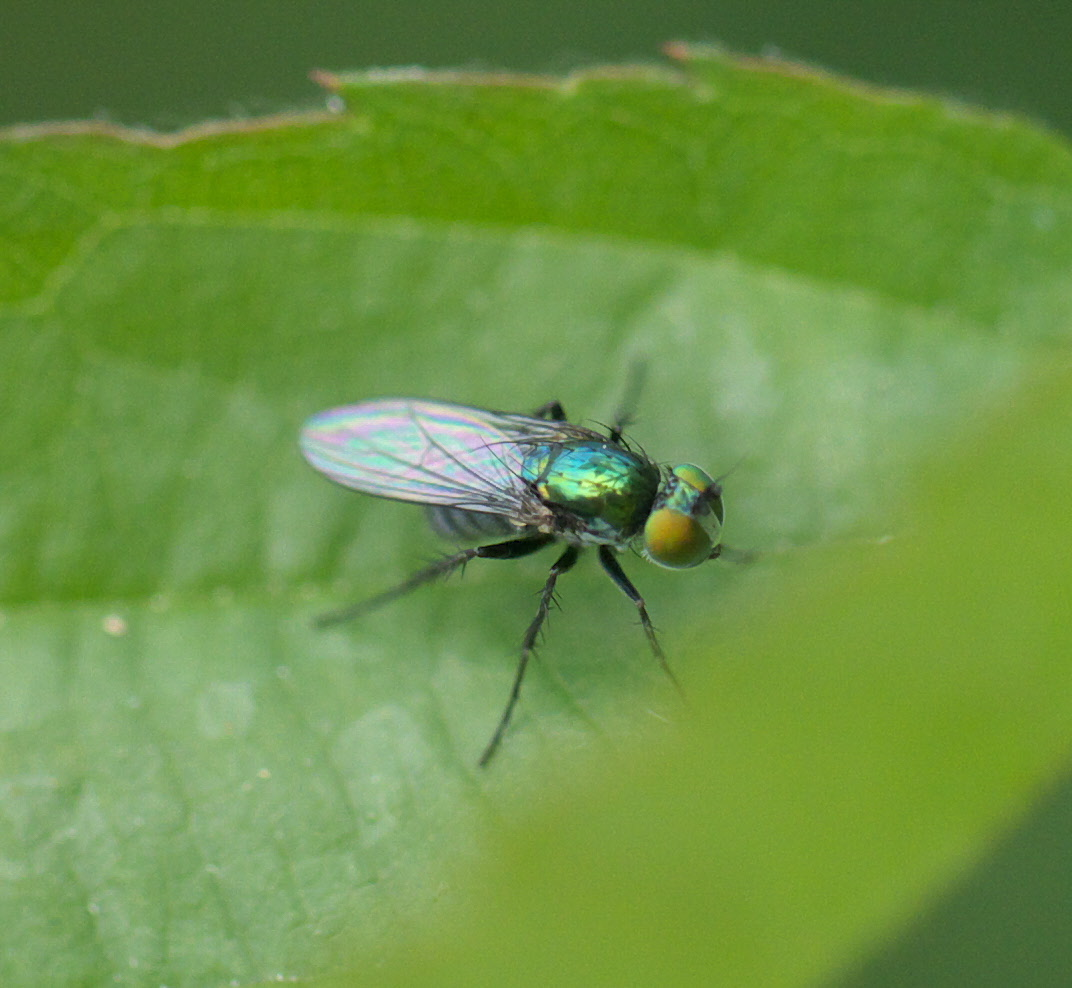

== Species groups and subgenera ==
The following species groups exist in Dolichopus:

- Dolichopus latipennis species group (= Hygroceleuthus Loew, 1857)
- Dolichopus lonchophorus species group
- Dolichopus longisetus species group
- Dolichopus planitarsis species group (8 species) – Palaearctic
- Dolichopus plumipes species group (11 species) – Palaearctic
- Dolichopus sagittarius species group
- Dolichopus salictorum species group
- Dolichopus signifer species group
- Dolichopus sublimbatus species group (4 species)
- Dolichopus tewoensis species group (3 species) – China

Sometimes the following are considered subgenera of Dolichopus:

- Dolichopus Latreille, 1796
- Hygroceleuthus Loew, 1857 (= Dolichopus latipennis species group)
- Macrodolichopus Stackelberg, 1933

== See also ==
- List of Dolichopus species
