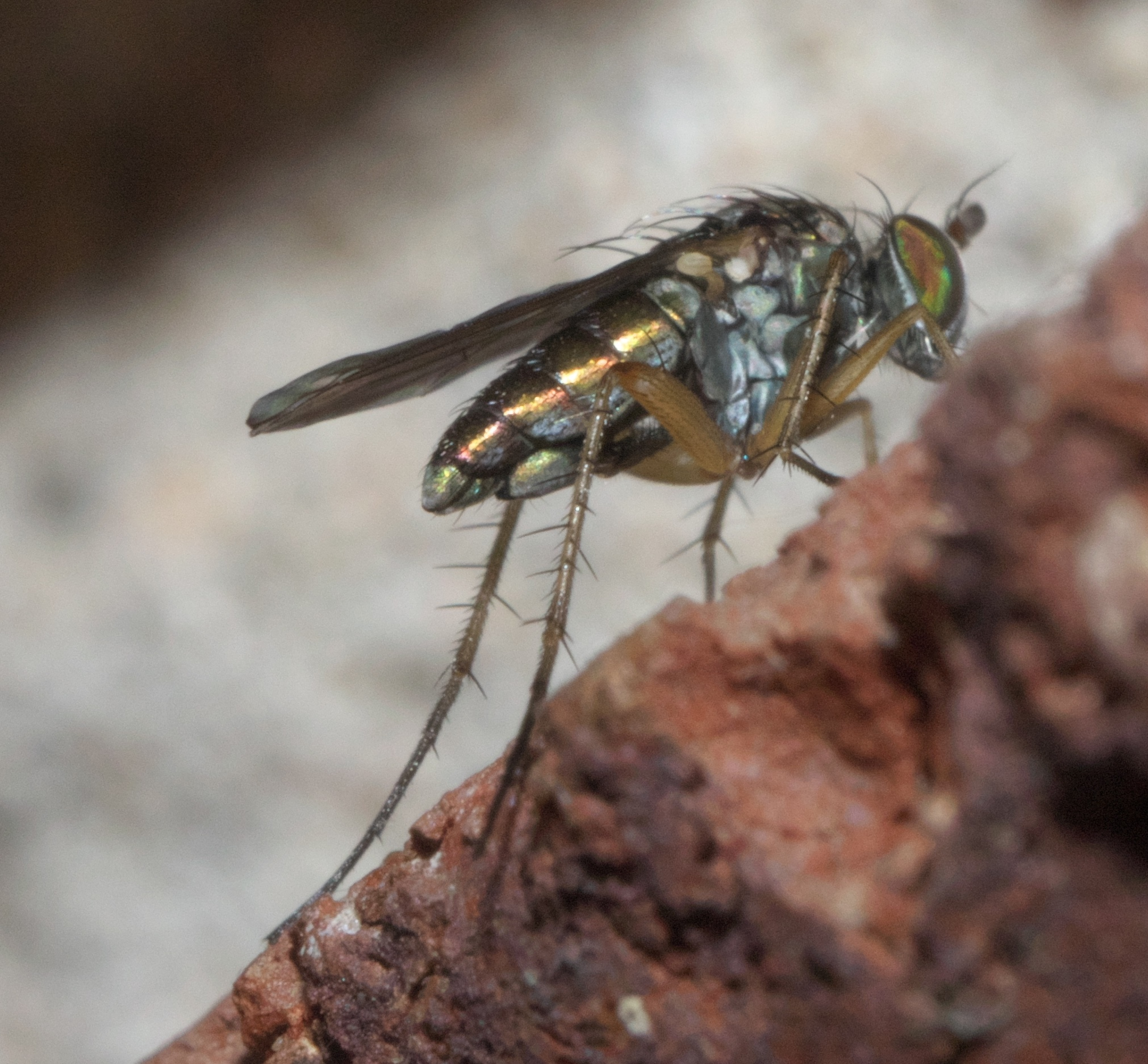
- Pelastoneurus vagans

Scientific classification
- Kingdom: Animalia
- Phylum: Arthropoda
- Clade: Pancrustacea
- Class: Insecta
- Order: Diptera
- Family: Dolichopodidae
- Subfamily: Dolichopodinae
- Tribe: Tachytrechini
- Genus: Pelastoneurus; Loew, 1861

Type species
- Pelastoneurus vagans Loew, 1861

Synonyms
- Paracleius Bigot, 1859 (name suppressed); Metapelastoneurus Aldrich, 1894; Phylarchus Aldrich, 1901 (nec Simon, 1888); Sarcionus Aldrich, 1901; Paraclius Kertész, 1909; Proarchus Aldrich, 1910

= Pelastoneurus =

Genus of flies

Pelastoneurus is a genus of flies in the family Dolichopodidae.

== Species ==
- Pelastoneurus abbreviatus Loew, 1864
- Pelastoneurus acuticauda Van Duzee, 1929
- Pelastoneurus acutispina (Van Duzee, 1931)
- Pelastoneurus aequalis Van Duzee, 1927
- Pelastoneurus aldrichi Van Duzee, 1923
- Pelastoneurus angulatus Robinson, 1964
- Pelastoneurus argentiferus Aldrich, 1896
- Pelastoneurus asciaeformis Becker, 1922
- Pelastoneurus aurifacies Van Duzee, 1923
- Pelastoneurus barbicauda Van Duzee, 1923
- Pelastoneurus barri Harmston, 1972
- Pelastoneurus bequarti Van Duzee, 1933
- Pelastoneurus bifarius Becker, 1922
- Pelastoneurus bifrons (Walker, 1852)
- Pelastoneurus bigeminatus Aldrich, 1901
- Pelastoneurus biguttatus Becker, 1922
- Pelastoneurus bilamellatus Van Duzee, 1931
- Pelastoneurus bilineatus Van Duzee, 1931
- Pelastoneurus brasiliensis Van Duzee, 1931
- Pelastoneurus brevis Robinson, 1964
- Pelastoneurus caeruleus Van Duzee, 1923
- Pelastoneurus cancioi Parent, 1933
- Pelastoneurus cognatus Loew, 1861
- Pelastoneurus comatus Robinson, 1992
- Pelastoneurus costalis Van Duzee, 1923
- Pelastoneurus crassinervis Parent, 1934
- Pelastoneurus currani (Van Duzee, 1931)
- Pelastoneurus cyaneus Wheeler, 1899
- Pelastoneurus decorus Parent, 1931
- Pelastoneurus digitulus Becker, 1922
- Pelastoneurus dissimilipes Wheeler, 1899
- Pelastoneurus dorsalis Van Duzee, 1923
- Pelastoneurus fasciatus von Roder, 1885
- Pelastoneurus flavicornis De Meijere, 1916
- Pelastoneurus flavicoxa (Aldrich, 1901)
- Pelastoneurus flavipes Schiner, 1868
- Pelastoneurus floridanus Wheeler, 1899
- Pelastoneurus furcatus Van Duzee, 1929
- Pelastoneurus furcifer Loew, 1872
- Pelastoneurus fuscipennis Van Duzee, 1929
- Pelastoneurus fuscitarsis Van Duzee, 1932
- Pelastoneurus hamatus Aldrich, 1901
- Pelastoneurus insulanus Van Duzee, 1923
- Pelastoneurus intactus Becker, 1922
- Pelastoneurus intermedius (Van Duzee, 1931)
- Pelastoneurus johannis Meuffels & Grootaert, 1999
- Pelastoneurus kansensis (Aldrich, 1894)
- Pelastoneurus laetus Loew, 1861
- Pelastoneurus lamellatus Loew, 1864
- Pelastoneurus latifacies Van Duzee, 1930
- Pelastoneurus lineatus Aldrich, 1896
- Pelastoneurus longicauda Loew, 1861
- Pelastoneurus lorifer Parent, 1931
- Pelastoneurus lugubris Loew, 1861
- Pelastoneurus luteifacies Parent, 1934
- Pelastoneurus luteoscutatus Parent, 1941
- Pelastoneurus maculatus (Van Duzee, 1929)
- Pelastoneurus maculitibia Van Duzee, 1929
- Pelastoneurus mexicanus (Bigot, 1888)
- Pelastoneurus neglectus Wheeler, 1899
- Pelastoneurus neolineatus Brooks, 2005
- Pelastoneurus nigrescens Wheeler, 1899
- Pelastoneurus nigricornis Van Duzee, 1923
- Pelastoneurus nigrifacies Van Duzee, 1923
- Pelastoneurus nigritibia Parent, 1934
- Pelastoneurus nigriventris De Meijere, 1916
- Pelastoneurus nitidus Van Duzee, 1931
- Pelastoneurus obtusus (Van Duzee, 1933)
- Pelastoneurus occidentalis Wheeler, 1899
- Pelastoneurus ochreifacies Van Duzee, 1931
- Pelastoneurus parvus Aldrich, 1904
- Pelastoneurus pectinatus Van Duzee, 1929
- Pelastoneurus pectinicauda (Van Duzee, 1934)
- Pelastoneurus plumicauda Van Duzee, 1931
- Pelastoneurus plumosus Parent, 1934
- Pelastoneurus potomacus Robinson, 1992
- Pelastoneurus proximus Aldrich, 1904
- Pelastoneurus pusillus (Macquart, 1846)
- Pelastoneurus remissus Parent, 1939
- Pelastoneurus rotundicornis (Van Duzee, 1931)
- Pelastoneurus scutatus Aldrich, 1904
- Pelastoneurus semiplumatus Becker, 1922
- Pelastoneurus seticauda Van Duzee, 1930
- Pelastoneurus stentorius Harmston, 1971
- Pelastoneurus striatus Parent, 1928
- Pelastoneurus taeniatus Becker, 1922
- Pelastoneurus tibialis Van Duzee, 1923
- Pelastoneurus trapezoides Becker, 1922
- Pelastoneurus tripartitus (Aldrich, 1901)
- Pelastoneurus turbidus Becker, 1922
- Pelastoneurus umbripictus Becker, 1922
- Pelastoneurus unguiculatus (Aldrich, 1896)
- Pelastoneurus vagans Loew, 1861
- Pelastoneurus vanduzeei Parent, 1931
- Pelastoneurus varius (Walker, 1852)
- Pelastoneurus vegetus Frey, 1925
- Pelastoneurus versicolor Van Duzee, 1932
- Pelastoneurus wheelerii Melander, 1900

Unrecognised species:

- Pelastoneurus contingens (Walker, 1852)
- Pelastoneurus hebes (Walker, 1852)
- Pelastoneurus heteroneurus (Macquart, 1850)
- Pelastoneurus ineptus (Walker, 1852)
- Pelastoneurus irrasus (Walker, 1849)
- Pelastoneurus maculipes (Walker, 1852)
- Pelastoneurus pilosicornis (Walker, 1849)
- Pelastoneurus torquatus (Bigot, 1890)

Synonyms:

- Pelastoneurus punctipennis (Say, 1829): moved to Stenopygium
- Pelastoneurus variegatus Aldrich, 1901: Synonym of Stenopygium punctipennis (Say, 1829)
