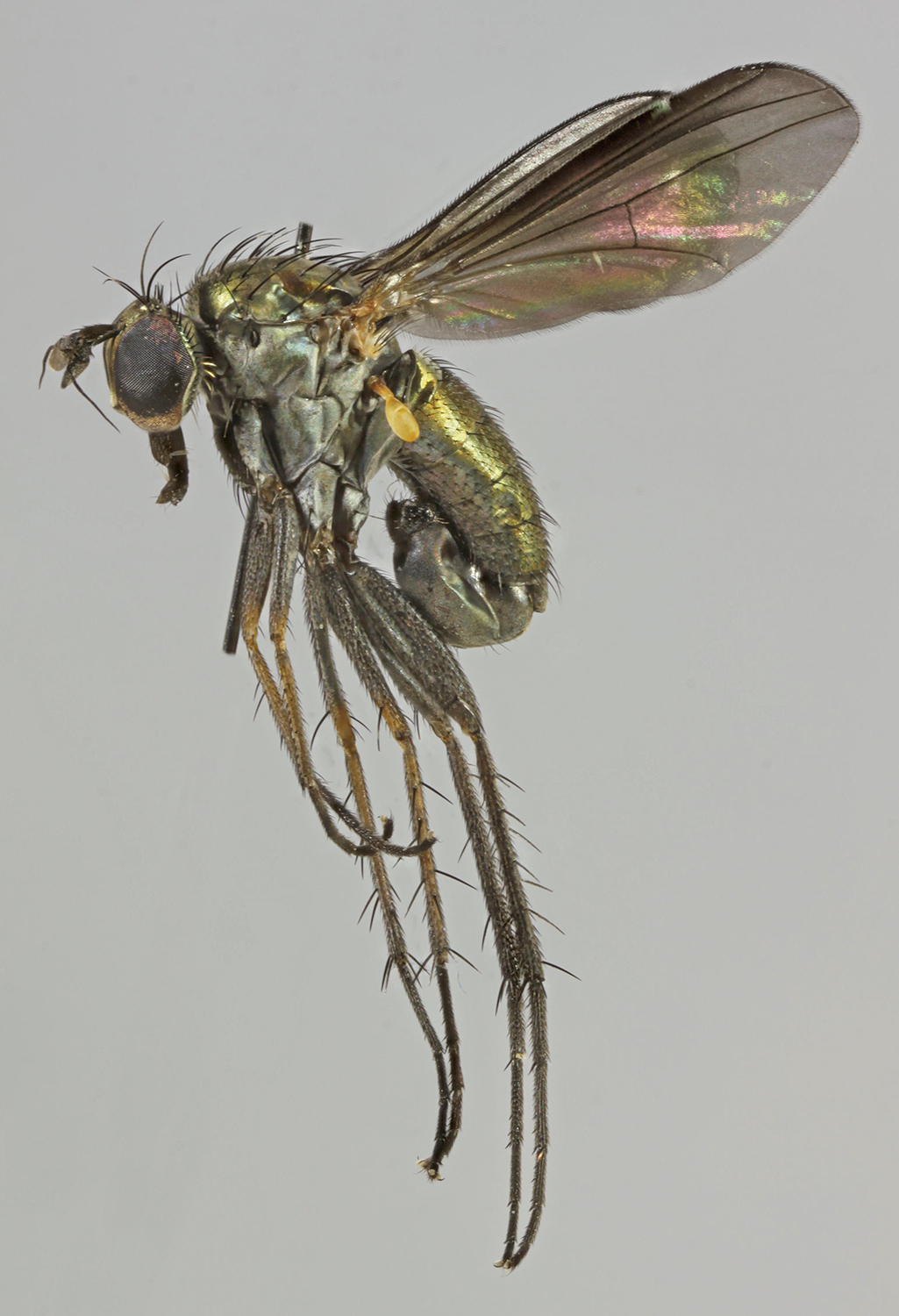
- Hercostomus nigripennis North Wales

Scientific classification
- Kingdom: Animalia
- Phylum: Arthropoda
- Class: Insecta
- Order: Diptera
- Family: Dolichopodidae
- Subfamily: Dolichopodinae
- Genus: Hercostomus; Loew, 1857

Type species
- Sybistroma longiventris Loew, 1857

Synonyms
- Phalacrosoma Becker, 1922; Microhercostomus Stackelberg, 1949; Steleopyga Grootaert & Meuffels, 2001; ?Ahercostomus Yang & Saigusa, 2001

= Hercostomus =

Genus of flies

Hercostomus is a genus of flies in the family Dolichopodidae. It is a large genus, containing more than 483 species worldwide. Multiple studies have shown that Hercostomus is a polyphyletic assemblage of species.

== Species groups ==
The genus currently includes the following species groups, at least 25 of which are known from China:

- Hercostomus abnormis group – China
- Hercostomus absimilis group – China
- Hercostomus albidipes group – China
- Hercostomus apiculatus group – China
- Hercostomus baishanzuensis group – China
- Hercostomus biancistrus group – China
- Hercostomus crassivena group – China
- Hercostomus curvus group – China
- Hercostomus cyaneculus group – China
- Hercostomus digitatus group – China
- Hercostomus digitiformis group – China
- Hercostomus fatuus group – China
- Hercostomus flavimaculatus group – China
- Hercostomus flaviventris group – China
- Hercostomus fluvius group – China
- Hercostomus hamatus group – China(?)
- Hercostomus incisus group – China
- Hercostomus intactus group – China
- Hercostomus longicercus group – China
- Hercostomus longus group – China
- Hercostomus nanlingensis group – China
- Hercostomus plagiatus group – Palearctic
- Hercostomus prolongatus group – China
- Hercostomus quadriseta group – China
- Hercostomus shennongjiensis group – China(?)
- Hercostomus subnovus group – China
- Hercostomus takagii group – China
- Hercostomus ulrichi group – China

The Palearctic species of Hercostomus are traditionally separated into five numbered groups, based on the coloration of the femora, postocular setae and antennae:

- Group I: Femora yellow; lower postocular setae yellow or white; antennae partly yellow
- Group II: Femora yellow; lower postocular setae yellow or white; antennae black
- Group III: Femora yellow; lower postocular setae black
- Group IV: Femora black; lower postocular setae yellow or white
- Group V: Femora black; lower postocular setae black

In 1999, Igor Grichanov divided the Afrotropical species of Hercostomus into three numbered groups. Two of these have since been separated into their own genera:

- Group I: now Afrohercostomus
- Group II: considered part of Hercostomus sensu stricto
- Group III: now Neohercostomus

== See also ==
- List of Hercostomus species
