= Siphona variata =

Scientific classification
- Kingdom: Animalia
- Phylum: Arthropoda
- Clade: Pancrustacea
- Class: Insecta
- Order: Diptera
- Family: Tachinidae
- Subfamily: Tachininae
- Tribe: Siphonini
- Genus: Siphona
- Species: S. variata

Binomial name
- Siphona variata Andersen, 1982

Species of fly

Siphona variata is a Palearctic species of fly in the family Tachinidae.

== Distribution ==
United Kingdom.
