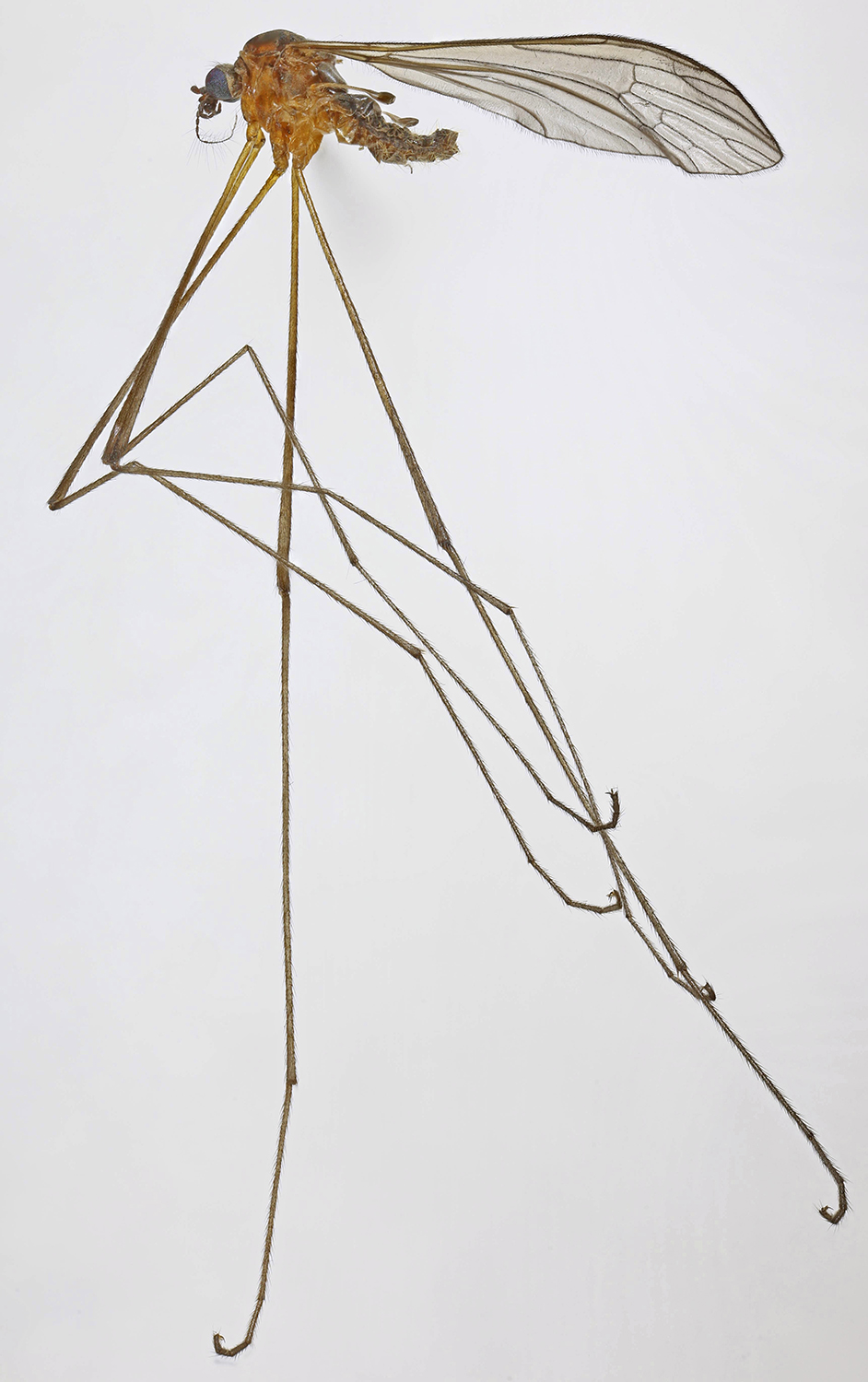
- Pilaria discicollis

Scientific classification
- Domain: Eukaryota
- Kingdom: Animalia
- Phylum: Arthropoda
- Class: Insecta
- Order: Diptera
- Family: Limoniidae
- Subfamily: Limnophilinae
- Genus: Pilaria; Sintenis, 1889

Type species
- Limnobia pilicornis Zetterstedt, 1851 (= meridiana Stæger, 1840)

Species
- See text

Synonyms
- Eulimnophila Alexander, 1919

= Pilaria =

Genus of flies

Pilaria is a genus of crane flies in the family Limoniidae.

== Species ==
- P. albopostica Alexander, 1974
- P. alboposticata Alexander, 1931
- P. amica (Alexander, 1915)
- P. arguta Alexander, 1929
- P. brevitarsis Alexander, 1956
- P. brevivena Alexander, 1956
- P. brooksi Alexander, 1953
- P. carbonipes Alexander, 1931
- P. chionomera Alexander, 1956
- P. chionopoda Alexander, 1972
- P. coorgensis Alexander, 1963
- P. decolor (Zetterstedt, 1851)
- P. discicollis (Meigen, 1818)
- P. dorsalis Alexander, 1924
- P. flava (Garrett, 1925)
- P. formosicola Alexander, 1929
- P. fuscipennis (Meigen, 1818)
- P. harrisoni Alexander, 1936
- P. hypermeca Alexander, 1970
- P. imbecilla (Osten Sacken, 1860)
- P. melanota Alexander, 1922
- P. meridiana (Stæger, 1840)
- P. microcera Alexander, 1924
- P. nigropunctata (Agrell, 1945)
- P. perelongata Alexander, 1976
- P. phaeonota Alexander, 1943
- P. quadrata (Osten Sacken, 1860)
- P. recondita (Osten Sacken, 1869)
- P. rubella Alexander, 1926
- P. scutellata (Stæger, 1840)
- P. simulans Savchenko, 1983
- P. sordidipes Alexander, 1972
- P. stanwoodae (Alexander, 1914)
- P. subalbipes Alexander, 1956
- P. tenuipes (Say, 1823)
- P. tiro Alexander, 1972
- P. tokionis (Alexander, 1920)
- P. vermontana Alexander, 1929
