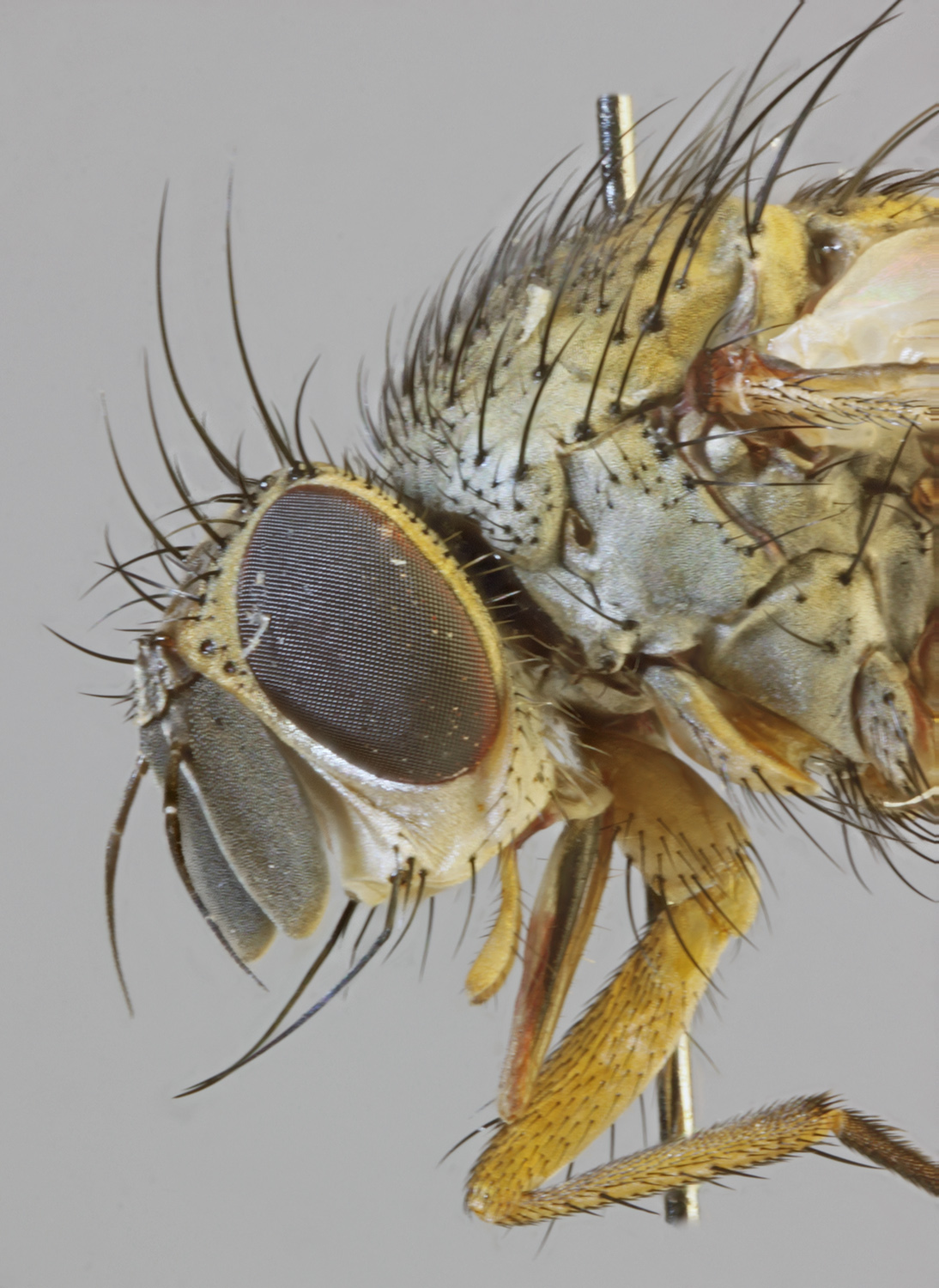
- Siphona maculata North Wales

Scientific classification
- Kingdom: Animalia
- Phylum: Arthropoda
- Clade: Pancrustacea
- Class: Insecta
- Order: Diptera
- Family: Tachinidae
- Genus: Siphona
- Subgenus: Siphona
- Species: S. maculata

Binomial name
- Siphona maculata Stæger, 1849

= Siphona maculata =

Species of fly

Siphona maculata is a Palearctic species of fly in the family Tachinidae.

== Distribution ==
Canada, United States, British Isles, Czech Republic, Hungary, Lithuania, Poland, Slovakia, Ukraine, Denmark, Finland, Norway, Sweden, Bulgaria, Italy, Austria, France, Germany, Netherlands, Switzerland, Russia, Transcaucasia.

== Hosts ==
Noctuidae.
