= Entomophaga =

Entomophaga is the scientific name of two genera of organisms and may refer to:

- Entomophaga (fly), a genus of insects in the family Tachinidae
- Entomophaga (fungus), a genus of fungi in the family Entomophthoraceae
