= Ceromya silacea =

Scientific classification
- Kingdom: Animalia
- Phylum: Arthropoda
- Clade: Pancrustacea
- Class: Insecta
- Order: Diptera
- Family: Tachinidae
- Subfamily: Tachininae
- Tribe: Siphonini
- Genus: Ceromya
- Species: C. silacea

Binomial name
- Ceromya silacea (Meigen, 1824)

Synonyms
- Tachina silacea Meigen, 1824; Thryptocera siebecki Sintenis, 1897

Species of fly

Ceromya silacea is a Palearctic species of fly in the family Tachinidae.

== Distribution ==
Germany, United Kingdom, Hungary, Poland Japan, Russia.

== Hosts ==
Protodeltote pygarga.
