= Peribaea setinervis =

Scientific classification
- Kingdom: Animalia
- Phylum: Arthropoda
- Clade: Pancrustacea
- Class: Insecta
- Order: Diptera
- Family: Tachinidae
- Subfamily: Tachininae
- Tribe: Siphonini
- Genus: Peribaea
- Species: P. setinervis

Binomial name
- Peribaea setinervis (Thomson, 1869)

Synonyms
- Thryptocera setinervis Thomson, 1869; Thryptocera fissicornis Strobl, 1910

Species of fly

Peribaea setinervis is a Palearctic species of fly in the family Tachinidae.

== Distribution ==
United Kingdom, Czech Republic, Lithuania, Ukraine, Norway, Italy, Serbia, Slovenia, Austria, Japan, South Korea, Russia, China, Myanmar.

== Hosts ==
Moths in the families Geometridae and Lasiocampidae.
