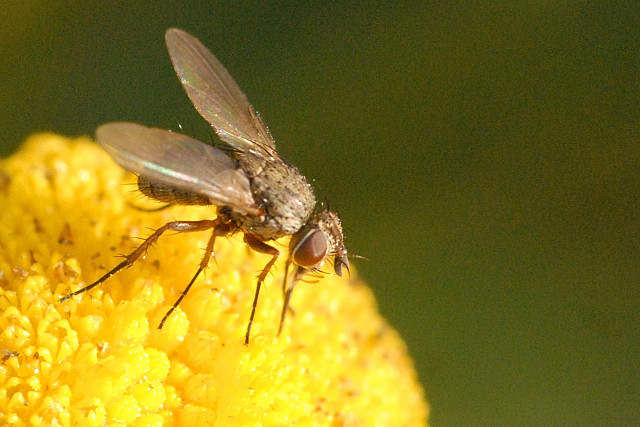

Scientific classification
- Kingdom: Animalia
- Phylum: Arthropoda
- Clade: Pancrustacea
- Class: Insecta
- Order: Diptera
- Family: Tachinidae
- Genus: Siphona
- Subgenus: Siphona
- Species: S. pauciseta

Binomial name
- Siphona pauciseta Rondani, 1865

Synonyms
- Siphona oculata Pandellé, 1894; Siphona delicatula Mesnil, 1960

= Siphona pauciseta =

Species of fly

Siphona pauciseta is a Palearctic species of fly in the family Tachinidae.

== Distribution ==
Most of Europe, Russia, Mongolia.

== Hosts ==
Achlya flavicornis.
