= Siphona (subgenus) =

Scientific classification
- Kingdom: Animalia
- Phylum: Arthropoda
- Clade: Pancrustacea
- Class: Insecta
- Order: Diptera
- Family: Tachinidae
- Genus: Siphona
- Subgenus: Siphona; Meigen, 1803

Synonyms
- Actinocrocuta Townsend, 1935; Asiphona Mesnil, 1954; Bucentes Latreille, 1809; Phantasiosiphona Townsend, 1915; Syphona Robineau-Desvoidy, 1830

Subgenus of flies

Siphona is a subgenus of flies in the family Tachinidae.

== Species ==
- Siphona abbreviata (Villeneuve, 1915)
- Siphona akidnomyia O'Hara, 1982
- Siphona albocincta (Villeneuve, 1942)
- Siphona amoena (Mesnil, 1952)
- Siphona amplicornis Mesnil, 1959
- Siphona angusta Mesnil, 1959
- Siphona antennalis (Mesnil, 1952)
- Siphona atricapilla Mesnil, 1959
- Siphona bevisi Curran, 1941
- Siphona bilineata (Mesnil, 1952)
- Siphona boreata Mesnil, 1960
- Siphona brunnea O'Hara, 1982
- Siphona capensis Curran, 1941
- Siphona collini Mesnil, 1960
- Siphona confusa Mesnil, 1961
- Siphona cothurnata (Mesnil, 1952)
- Siphona creberrima (Speiser, 1910)
- Siphona cristata (Fabricius, 1805)
- Siphona cuthbertsoni Curran, 1941
- Siphona efflatouni Mesnil, 1960
- Siphona flavifrons Stæger, 1849
- Siphona floridensis O'Hara, 1982
- Siphona foliacea (Mesnil, 1953)
- Siphona fuliginea Mesnil, 1977
- Siphona futilis Wulp, 1890
- Siphona gedeana Wulp, 1896
- Siphona geniculata (De Geer, 1776)
- Siphona gracilis (Mesnil, 1952)
- Siphona grandistylum Pandellé, 1894
- Siphona griseola Mesnil, 1970
- Siphona hokkaidensis Mesnil, 1957
- Siphona hungarica Andersen, 1984
- Siphona illinoiensis Townsend, 1891
- Siphona immaculata Andersen, 1996
- Siphona infuscata (Mesnil, 1952)
- Siphona ingerae Andersen, 1982
- Siphona intrudens (Curran, 1932)
- Siphona kairiensis O'Hara, 1983
- Siphona kuscheli (Cortés, 1952)
- Siphona lindneri (Mesnil, 1959)
- Siphona longissima O'Hara, 1982
- Siphona ludicra Mesnil, 1977
- Siphona lurida Reinhard, 1943
- Siphona lutea (Townsend, 1919)
- Siphona macronyx O'Hara, 1982
- Siphona maculata Stæger, 1849
- Siphona maderensis Smit & Zeegers, 2002
- Siphona maroccana Cerretti & Tschorsnig, 2007
- Siphona medialis O'Hara, 1982
- Siphona melania (Bezzi, 1908)
- Siphona melanura Mesnil, 1959
- Siphona multifaria O'Hara, 1982
- Siphona munroi Curran, 1941
- Siphona murina (Mesnil, 1952)
- Siphona nigricans (Villeneuve, 1930)
- Siphona nigrohalterata Mesnil, 1959
- Siphona nigroseta Curran, 1941
- Siphona nobilis (Mesnil, 1953)
- Siphona nuragica Cerretti & Tschorsnig, 2007
- Siphona obesa (Mesnil, 1952)
- Siphona obscuripennis Curran, 1941
- Siphona oligomyia O'Hara, 1981
- Siphona pacifica O'Hara, 1982
- Siphona paludosa Mesnil, 1960
- Siphona patellipalpis (Mesnil, 1952)
- Siphona pauciseta Rondani, 1865
- Siphona phantasma (Mesnil, 1952)
- Siphona pigra Mesnil, 1977
- Siphona pilistyla Andersen, 1996
- Siphona pisinnia O'Hara, 1982
- Siphona plorans (Mesnil, 1954)
- Siphona pretoriana O'Hara & Cerretti, 2016
- Siphona pseudomaculata Blanchard, 1963
- Siphona reducta (Mesnil, 1952)
- Siphona rizaba O'Hara, 1982
- Siphona rossica Mesnil, 1961
- Siphona rubrapex Mesnil, 1977
- Siphona rubrica (Mesnil, 1952)
- Siphona setinerva (Mesnil, 1952)
- Siphona setosa Mesnil, 1960
- Siphona seyrigi Mesnil, 1960
- Siphona simulans (Mesnil, 1952)
- Siphona sola Mesnil, 1959
- Siphona spinulosa (Mesnil, 1952)
- Siphona subarctica Andersen, 1996
- Siphona trichaeta (Mesnil, 1952)
- Siphona tropica (Townsend, 1915)
- Siphona unispina (Mesnil, 1952)
- Siphona vittata Curran, 1941
- Siphona wittei (Mesnil, 1952)
