= Ceromya monstrosicornis =

Scientific classification
- Kingdom: Animalia
- Phylum: Arthropoda
- Clade: Pancrustacea
- Class: Insecta
- Order: Diptera
- Family: Tachinidae
- Subfamily: Tachininae
- Tribe: Siphonini
- Genus: Ceromya
- Species: C. monstrosicornis

Binomial name
- Ceromya monstrosicornis (Stein, 1924)

Synonyms
- Stenoparia monstrosicornis Stein, 1924

Species of fly

Ceromya monstrosicornis is a Palearctic species of fly in the family Tachinidae.

== Distribution ==
Germany, United Kingdom.
