= Goniocera io =

Scientific classification
- Domain: Eukaryota
- Kingdom: Animalia
- Phylum: Arthropoda
- Class: Insecta
- Order: Diptera
- Family: Tachinidae
- Tribe: Siphonini
- Genus: Goniocera
- Species: G. io

Binomial name
- Goniocera io (Aldrich, 1929)

Synonyms
- Cartocometes io Aldrich, 1929

Species of fly

Goniocera io is a species of bristle fly in the family Tachinidae. It is found in North America.
