= Ceromya flaviseta =

Scientific classification
- Kingdom: Animalia
- Phylum: Arthropoda
- Clade: Pancrustacea
- Class: Insecta
- Order: Diptera
- Family: Tachinidae
- Subfamily: Tachininae
- Tribe: Siphonini
- Genus: Ceromya
- Species: C. flaviseta

Binomial name
- Ceromya flaviseta (Villeneuve, 1921)

Synonyms
- Actia flaviseta Villeneuve, 1921; Actia flaviceps Stein, 1924

Species of fly

Ceromya flaviseta is a Palearctic species of flies in the family Tachinidae.

== Distribution ==
Germany, United Kingdom, Switzerland, Russia.
