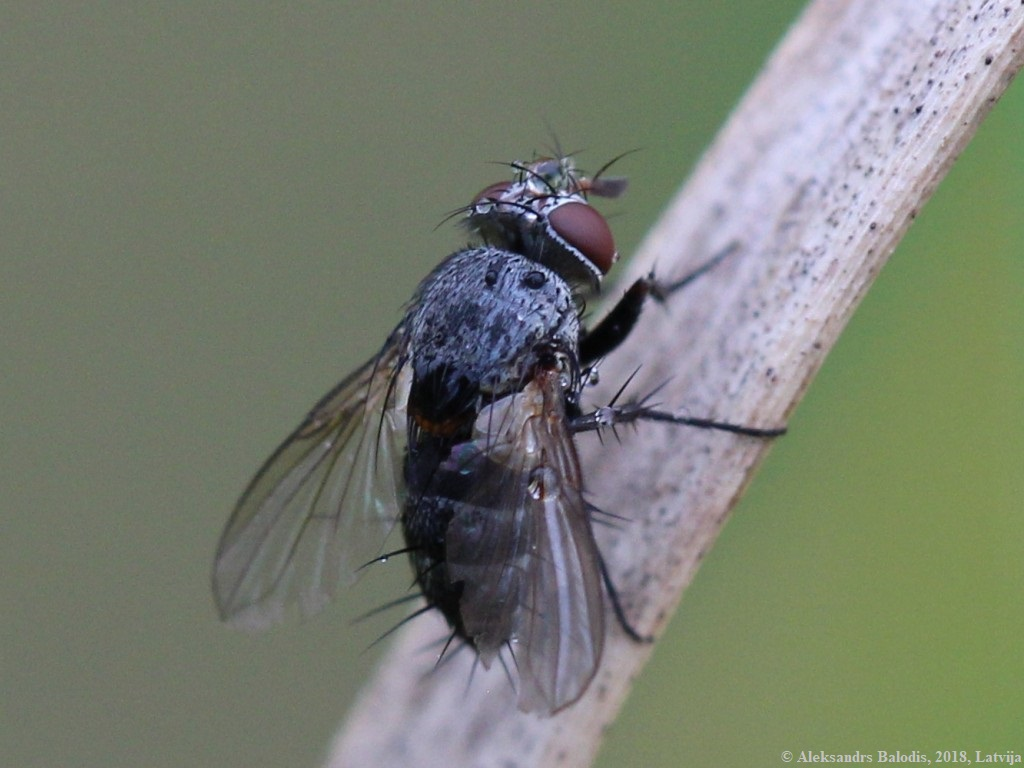

Scientific classification
- Kingdom: Animalia
- Phylum: Arthropoda
- Clade: Pancrustacea
- Class: Insecta
- Order: Diptera
- Family: Tachinidae
- Subfamily: Tachininae
- Tribe: Siphonini
- Genus: Peribaea
- Species: P. tibialis

Binomial name
- Peribaea tibialis Robineau-Desvoidy, 1851

Synonyms
- Herbstia tibialis Robineau-Desvoidy, 1851; Peribaea flavicornis Robineau-Desvoidy, 1863; Peribaea minuta Robineau-Desvoidy, 1863

= Peribaea tibialis =

Species of fly

Peribaea tibialis is a Palearctic species of fly in the family Tachinidae.

== Distribution ==
Uzbekistan, Czech Republic, Hungary, Moldova, Poland, Romania, Slovakia, Ukraine, Andorra, Bulgaria, Croatia, Greece, Italy, Portugal, Serbia, Spain, Turkey, Austria, Belgium, France, Germany, Liechtenstein, Netherlands, Switzerland, Japan, Korea, Iran, Israel, Mongolia, Morocco, Russia, Transcaucasia, Azerbaijan, D.R. Congo, Kenya, South Africa, China, Ryukyu Islands, Maldives, Myanmar, Taiwan.
