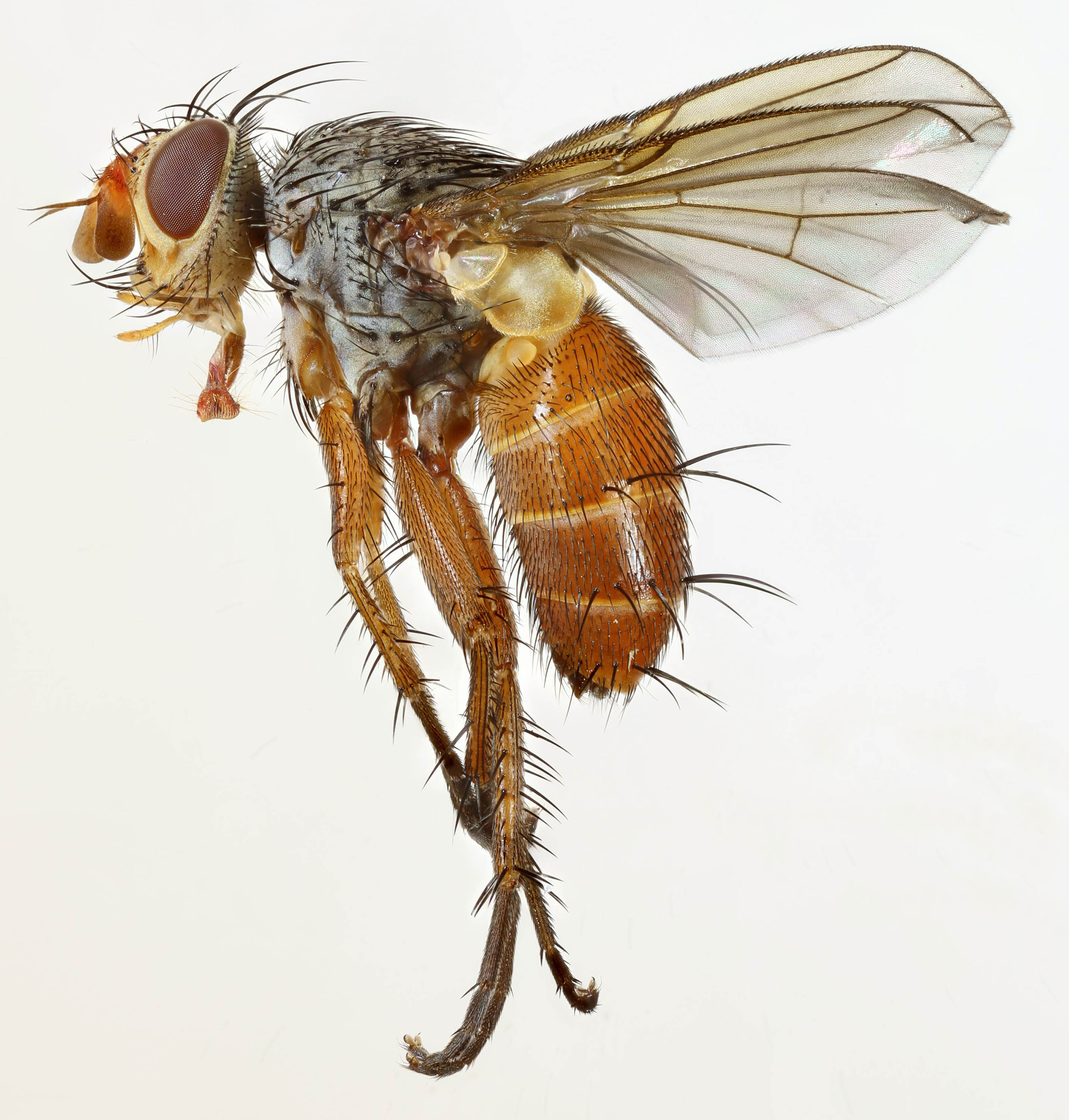
- Ceromya bicolor, Trawscoed, North Wales

Scientific classification
- Kingdom: Animalia
- Phylum: Arthropoda
- Clade: Pancrustacea
- Class: Insecta
- Order: Diptera
- Family: Tachinidae
- Subfamily: Tachininae
- Tribe: Siphonini
- Genus: Ceromya
- Species: C. bicolor

Binomial name
- Ceromya bicolor (Meigen, 1824)

Synonyms
- Tachina bicolor Meigen, 1824; Ceromya testacea Robineau-Desvoidy, 1830; Tachina rufina Zetterstedt, 1938; Actia fasciata Stein, 1924

= Ceromya bicolor =

Species of fly

Ceromya bicolor is a Palearctic species of fly in the family Tachinidae.

== Distribution ==
France, United Kingdom, Hungary, Slovenia, Sweden, Russia.

== Hosts ==
Lasiocampidae.
