= Siphona abdominalis =

Scientific classification
- Kingdom: Animalia
- Phylum: Arthropoda
- Clade: Pancrustacea
- Class: Insecta
- Order: Diptera
- Family: Tachinidae
- Genus: Siphona
- Subgenus: Ceranthia
- Species: S. abdominalis

Binomial name
- Siphona abdominalis (Robineau-Desvoidy, 1830)

Synonyms
- Ceromya abdominalis Robineau-Desvoidy, 1830; Siphona anomala Stæger, 1849; Ceranthia fulvipes Robineau-Desvoidy, 1830; Ceranthia fulvipes Robineau-Desvoidy, 1850; Ceromya vivida Robineau-Desvoidy, 1830

Species of fly

Siphona (Ceranthia) abdominalis is a tachinid fly in the subgenus Ceranthia of the family Tachinidae. The species was first described by Jean-Baptiste Robineau-Desvoidy in 1830.

== Distribution ==
British Isles, Belarus, Czech Republic, Hungary, Lithuania, Poland, Slovakia, Ukraine, Denmark, Finland, Norway, Sweden, Italy, Austria, France, Germany, Netherlands, Switzerland, Russia Transcaucasia.

== Hosts ==
Cyclophora moth species and Thera britannica (spruce carpet moth) are hosts.
