= Proceromyia =

Scientific classification
- Kingdom: Animalia
- Phylum: Arthropoda
- Class: Insecta
- Order: Diptera
- Family: Tachinidae
- Subfamily: Tachininae
- Tribe: Siphonini
- Genus: Proceromyia; Mesnil, 1957

Type species
- Ceromyia (Proceromyia) macronychia Mesnil, 1957

Synonyms
- Nipponoceromyia Mesnil & Shima, 1978

Genus of flies

Proceromyia is a genus of flies in the family Tachinidae. It was originally a subgenus of Ceromya, but was later raised in rank to genus by James E. O'Hara in 1989. It was reviewed by T. Tachi and H. Shima in 2006 and was confirmed to be monophyletic; it was also found to form a monophyletic group with Entomophaga.

== Species ==
- Proceromyia macronychia (Mesnil, 1957)
- Proceromyia pubioculata (Mesnil & Shima, 1978)
