= Rhacodinella apicata =

Scientific classification
- Kingdom: Animalia
- Phylum: Arthropoda
- Class: Insecta
- Order: Diptera
- Family: Tachinidae
- Subfamily: Exoristinae
- Tribe: Goniini
- Genus: Rhacodinella
- Species: R. apicata

Binomial name
- Rhacodinella apicata (Pandellé, 1896)

Synonyms
- Tachina apicata Pandellé, 1896

Species of fly

Rhacodinella apicata is a genus of flies in the family Tachinidae.

== Distribution ==
Poland, Italy, Spain, France, Switzerland, Russia.
