= Ceromya lutea =

Scientific classification
- Kingdom: Animalia
- Phylum: Arthropoda
- Class: Insecta
- Order: Diptera
- Family: Tachinidae
- Subfamily: Tachininae
- Tribe: Siphonini
- Genus: Ceromya
- Species: C. lutea

Binomial name
- Ceromya lutea (Townsend, 1927)

Synonyms
- Actinactia lutea Townsend, 1927

Species of fly

Ceromya lutea is a species of tachinid flies in the genus Ceromya of the family Tachinidae.

== Distribution ==
Brazil.
