= Phyllomya procera =

Scientific classification
- Kingdom: Animalia
- Phylum: Arthropoda
- Class: Insecta
- Order: Diptera
- Family: Tachinidae
- Subfamily: Dexiinae
- Tribe: Voriini
- Genus: Phyllomya
- Species: P. procera

Binomial name
- Phyllomya procera (Meigen, 1824)

Synonyms
- Hypostena chetigastra Rondani, 1861; Hypostena incisuralis Macquart, 1855; Melanophora planigena Pandellé, 1896; Myobia pisciventris Pandellé, 1894; Tachina procera Meigen, 1824

Species of fly

Phyllomya procera is a species of fly in the family Tachinidae.

== Distribution ==
Poland, Andorra, Greece, Italy, Spain, France, Germany, Switzerland, Russia, Transcaucasia.
