= Rhacodinella =

Scientific classification
- Kingdom: Animalia
- Phylum: Arthropoda
- Class: Insecta
- Order: Diptera
- Family: Tachinidae
- Subfamily: Exoristinae
- Tribe: Goniini
- Genus: Rhacodinella; Mesnil, 1968

Type species
- Tachina (Masicera) apicata Pandellé, 1896

Genus of flies

Rhacodinella is a genus of flies in the family Tachinidae.

== Species ==
- Rhacodinella apicata (Pandellé, 1896)
- Rhacodinella aurata Mesnil, 1970
