= Ceromya amblycera =

Scientific classification
- Kingdom: Animalia
- Phylum: Arthropoda
- Class: Insecta
- Order: Diptera
- Family: Tachinidae
- Subfamily: Tachininae
- Tribe: Siphonini
- Genus: Ceromya
- Species: C. amblycera

Binomial name
- Ceromya amblycera (Aldrich, 1934)

Synonyms
- Actia amblycera Aldrich, 1934

Species of fly

Ceromya amblycera is a species of tachinid flies in the genus Ceromya of the family Tachinidae. It was originally placed in the genus Actia, but was moved to Ceromya by James E. O'Hara in 1989. It is known from Argentina.
