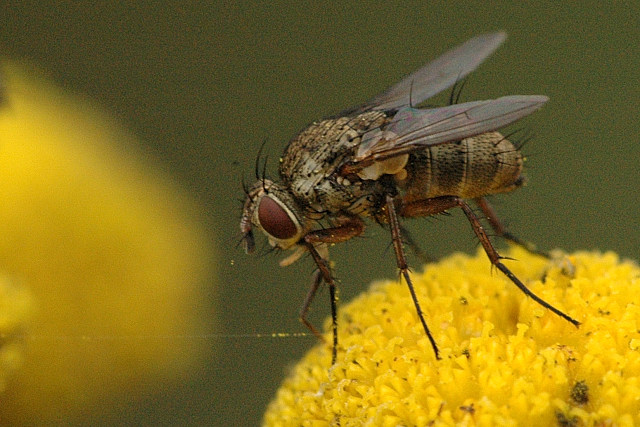
- Siphona geniculata

Scientific classification
- Kingdom: Animalia
- Phylum: Arthropoda
- Clade: Pancrustacea
- Class: Insecta
- Order: Diptera
- Family: Tachinidae
- Subfamily: Tachininae
- Tribe: Siphonini
- Genus: Siphona; Meigen, 1803

Type species
- Musca geniculata De Geer, 1776

Synonyms
- Actinocrocuta Townsend, 1935; Asiphona Mesnil, 1954; Bucentes Latreille, 1809; Phantasiosiphona Townsend, 1915; Syphona Robineau-Desvoidy, 1830

= Siphona =

Genus of flies

Siphona is a genus of flies in the family Tachinidae.

Aphantorhaphopsis and Ceranthia are sometimes not considered subgenera of Siphona, though some European workers seem to contend that these are genera in their own right.

== Species ==
- Actinocrocuta Townsend, 1935

- Siphona singularis (Wiedemann, 1830)

- Aphantorhapha Townsend, 1919

- Siphona arizonica Townsend, 1919
- Siphona atoma Reinhard, 1947

- Aphantorhaphopsis Townsend, 1926

- Siphona alticola (Mesnil, 1953)
- Siphona angustifrons (Malloch, 1930)
- Siphona brunnescens (Villeneuve, 1921)
- Siphona crassulata (Mesnil, 1953)
- Siphona fera Mesnil, 1954
- Siphona laboriosa (Mesnil, 1957)
- Siphona laticornis (Malloch, 1930
- Siphona nigronitens Mesnil, 1954
- Siphona norma (Malloch, 1929)
- Siphona orientalis (Townsend, 1926)
- Siphona perispoliata (Mesnil, 1953)
- Siphona picturata (Mesnil, 1977)
- Siphona pudica Mesnil, 1954
- Siphona samarensis (Villeneuve, 1921)
- Siphona selangor (Malloch, 1930
- Siphona selecta (Pandellé, 1894)
- Siphona siphonoides (Strobl, 1898)
- Siphona speciosa Mesnil, 1954
- Siphona starkei Mesnil, 1952
- Siphona verralli (Wainwright, 1928)
- Siphona xanthosoma Mesnil, 1954

- Baeomyia O’Hara, 1984

- Siphona antennata (O’Hara, 1984)
- Siphona hurdi (Reinhard, 1959)
- Siphona sonorensis (O’Hara, 1984)
- Siphona xanthogaster (O’Hara, 1984)

- Ceranthia Robineau-Desvoidy, 1830

- Siphona abdominalis (Robineau-Desvoidy, 1830)
- Siphona angusta Tachi & Sama, 2005
- Siphona flavipes (Coquillett, 1897)
- Siphona impropria Herting, 1987
- Siphona japonica Mesnil, 1963
- Siphona jocosa (Villeneuve, 1942)
- Siphona lacrymans Mesnil, 1954
- Siphona lichtwardtiana (Villeneuve, 1931)
- Siphona livoricolor Mesnil, 1977
- Siphona nigra Tachi & Sama, 2005
- Siphona pallida Herting, 1959
- Siphona plorans Mesnil, 1954
- Siphona scutellata Mesnil, 1954
- Siphona setigera Tachi & Sama, 2005
- Siphona sulfurea Mesnil, 1971
- Siphona tenuipalpis (Villeneuve, 1921)
- Siphona terrosa Mesnil, 1954
- Siphona tristella Herting, 1966
- Siphona verneri Andersen, 1996

- Jimimyia Evenhuis, Pont & Whitmore, 20155

- Siphona brasiliensis (Townsend, 1929)
- Siphona conata (Reinhard, 1959)
- Siphona plusiae Coquillett, 1895

- Pseudosiphona Townsend, 1916

- Siphona brevirostris Coquillett, 1897

- Siphona Meigen, 1803

- Siphona abbreviata (Villeneuve, 1915)
- Siphona akidnomyia O'Hara, 1982
- Siphona albocincta (Villeneuve, 1942)
- Siphona amoena (Mesnil, 1952)
- Siphona amplicornis Mesnil, 1959
- Siphona angusta Mesnil, 1959
- Siphona antennalis (Mesnil, 1952)
- Siphona atricapilla Mesnil, 1959
- Siphona bevisi Curran, 1941
- Siphona bilineata (Mesnil, 1952)
- Siphona boreata Mesnil, 1960
- Siphona brunnea O'Hara, 1982
- Siphona capensis Curran, 1941
- Siphona collini Mesnil, 1960
- Siphona confusa Mesnil, 1961
- Siphona cothurnata (Mesnil, 1952)
- Siphona creberrima (Speiser, 1910)
- Siphona cristata (Fabricius, 1805)
- Siphona cuthbertsoni Curran, 1941
- Siphona efflatouni Mesnil, 1960
- Siphona flavifrons Stæger, 1849
- Siphona floridensis O'Hara, 1982
- Siphona foliacea (Mesnil, 1953)
- Siphona fuliginea Mesnil, 1977
- Siphona futilis Wulp, 1890
- Siphona gedeana Wulp, 1896
- Siphona geniculata (De Geer, 1776)
- Siphona gracilis (Mesnil, 1952)
- Siphona grandistylum Pandellé, 1894
- Siphona griseola Mesnil, 1970
- Siphona hokkaidensis Mesnil, 1957
- Siphona hungarica Andersen, 1984
- Siphona illinoiensis Townsend, 1891
- Siphona immaculata Andersen, 1996
- Siphona infuscata (Mesnil, 1952)
- Siphona ingerae Andersen, 1982
- Siphona intrudens (Curran, 1932)
- Siphona kairiensis O'Hara, 1983
- Siphona kuscheli (Cortés, 1952)
- Siphona lindneri (Mesnil, 1959)
- Siphona longissima O'Hara, 1982
- Siphona ludicra Mesnil, 1977
- Siphona lurida Reinhard, 1943
- Siphona lutea (Townsend, 1919)
- Siphona macronyx O'Hara, 1982
- Siphona maculata Stæger, 1849
- Siphona maderensis Smit & Zeegers, 2002
- Siphona maroccana Cerretti & Tschorsnig, 2007
- Siphona medialis O'Hara, 1982
- Siphona melania (Bezzi, 1908)
- Siphona melanura Mesnil, 1959
- Siphona multifaria O'Hara, 1982
- Siphona munroi Curran, 1941
- Siphona murina (Mesnil, 1952)
- Siphona nigricans (Villeneuve, 1930)
- Siphona nigrohalterata Mesnil, 1959
- Siphona nigroseta Curran, 1941
- Siphona nobilis (Mesnil, 1953)
- Siphona nuragica Cerretti & Tschorsnig, 2007
- Siphona obesa (Mesnil, 1952)
- Siphona obscuripennis Curran, 1941
- Siphona oligomyia O'Hara, 1981
- Siphona pacifica O'Hara, 1982
- Siphona paludosa Mesnil, 1960
- Siphona patellipalpis (Mesnil, 1952)
- Siphona pauciseta Rondani, 1865
- Siphona phantasma (Mesnil, 1952)
- Siphona pigra Mesnil, 1977
- Siphona pilistyla Andersen, 1996
- Siphona pisinnia O'Hara, 1982
- Siphona plorans (Mesnil, 1954)
- Siphona pretoriana O'Hara & Cerretti, 2016
- Siphona pseudomaculata Blanchard, 1963
- Siphona reducta (Mesnil, 1952)
- Siphona rizaba O'Hara, 1982
- Siphona rossica Mesnil, 1961
- Siphona rubrapex Mesnil, 1977
- Siphona rubrica (Mesnil, 1952)
- Siphona setinerva (Mesnil, 1952)
- Siphona setosa Mesnil, 1960
- Siphona seyrigi Mesnil, 1960
- Siphona simulans (Mesnil, 1952)
- Siphona sola Mesnil, 1959
- Siphona spinulosa (Mesnil, 1952)
- Siphona subarctica Andersen, 1996
- Siphona trichaeta (Mesnil, 1952)
- Siphona tropica (Townsend, 1915)
- Siphona unispina (Mesnil, 1952)
- Siphona vittata Curran, 1941
- Siphona wittei (Mesnil, 1952)

- Uruactia Townsend, 1927

- Siphona uruhuasi (Townsend, 1927)
