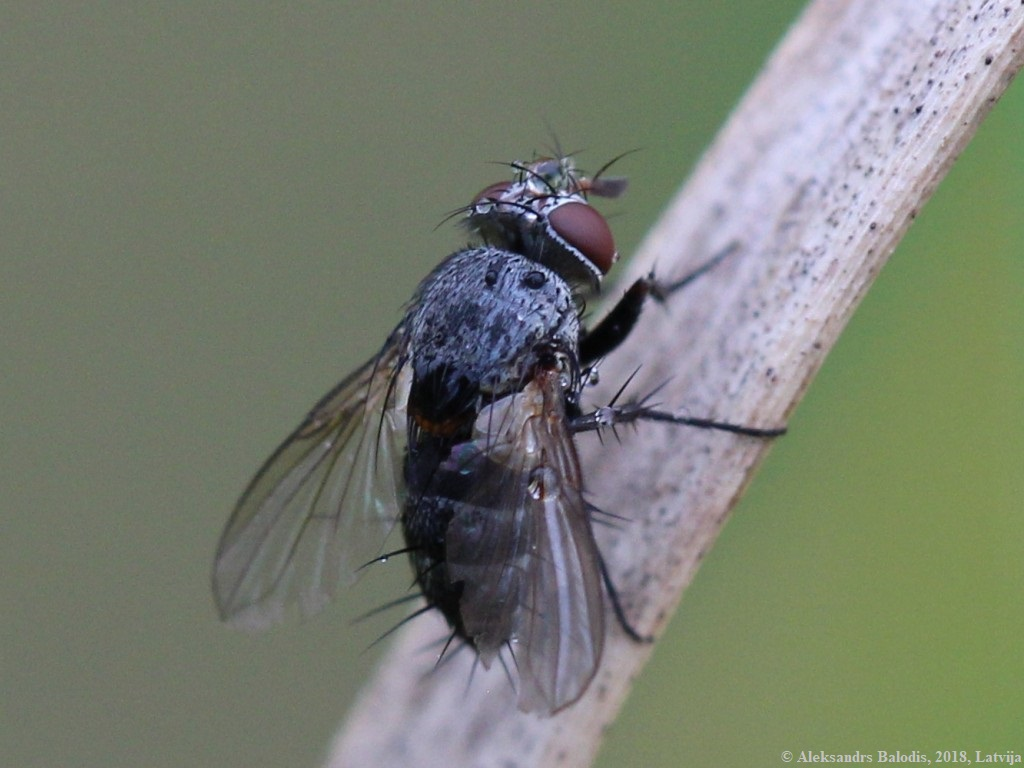
- Peribaea tibialis

Scientific classification
- Kingdom: Animalia
- Phylum: Arthropoda
- Class: Insecta
- Order: Diptera
- Family: Tachinidae
- Subfamily: Tachininae
- Tribe: Siphonini
- Genus: Peribaea; Robineau-Desvoidy, 1863

Type species
- Peribaea apicalis (= Herbstia tibialis Robineau-Desvoidy, 1851) Robineau-Desvoidy, 1863

Synonyms
- Herbstia Robineau-Desvoidy, 1851 (nec Milne-Edwards, 1834); Strobliomyia Townsend, 1926; Eogymnophthalma Townsend, 1926; Talaractia Malloch, 1930; Uschizactia Townsend, 1934

= Peribaea =

Genus of flies

Peribaea is a genus of flies in the family Tachinidae.

== Species ==
- Peribaea abbreviata Tachi & Shima, 2002
- Peribaea alternata Shima, 1981
- Peribaea annulata (Mesnil, 1954)
- Peribaea anthracina Mesnil, 1977
- Peribaea apaturae Tachi & Shima, 2002
- Peribaea apicalis Robineau-Desvoidy, 1863
- Peribaea argentifrons (Malloch, 1930)
- Peribaea baldwini (Malloch, 1930)
- Peribaea caesiata Tachi & Shima, 2002
- Peribaea cervina (Mesnil, 1954)
- Peribaea clara (Mesnil, 1954)
- Peribaea compacta (Curran, 1927)
- Peribaea discicornis (Pandellé, 1894)
- Peribaea egesta Tachi & Shima, 2002
- Peribaea fernia (Mesnil, 1954)
- Peribaea fissicornis (Strobl, 1910)
- Peribaea gibbicornis (Mesnil, 1954)
- Peribaea glabra Tachi & Shima, 2002
- Peribaea hertingi Andersen, 1996
- Peribaea hirsuta (Shima, 1970)
- Peribaea hongkongensis Tachi & Shima, 2002
- Peribaea hyalinata (Malloch, 1930)
- Peribaea illugiana (Shima, 1970)
- Peribaea insularis (Shima, 1970)
- Peribaea jepsoni (Villeneuve, 1937)
- Peribaea leucophaea (Mesnil, 1963)
- Peribaea lobata Mesnil, 1977
- Peribaea longirostris Andersen, 1996
- Peribaea longiseta (Villeneuve, 1936)
- Peribaea malayana (Malloch, 1935)
- Peribaea mitis (Curran, 1927)
- Peribaea modesta (Mesnil, 1954)
- Peribaea normula (Curran, 1927)
- Peribaea obscura (Germar, 1817)
- Peribaea orbata (Wiedemann, 1830)
- Peribaea palaestina (Villeneuve, 1934)
- Peribaea pectinata (Shima, 1970)
- Peribaea plebeia (Malloch, 1930)
- Peribaea pulla Mesnil, 1977
- Peribaea repanda (Mesnil, 1954)
- Peribaea rubea Mesnil, 1977
- Peribaea sedlaceki (Shima, 1970)
- Peribaea setinervis (Thomson, 1869)
- Peribaea similata (Malloch, 1930)
- Peribaea spoliata (Bezzi, 1923)
- Peribaea subaequalis (Malloch, 1930)
- Peribaea suspecta (Malloch, 1924)
- Peribaea tibialis (Robineau-Desvoidy, 1851)
- Peribaea timida (Mesnil, 1954)
- Peribaea trifurcata (Shima, 1970)
- Peribaea ugandana (Curran, 1933)
- Peribaea uniseta (Malloch, 1930)
- Peribaea ussuriensis (Mesnil, 1963)
- Peribaea vidua (Mesnil, 1954)
