= Siphona setosa =

Scientific classification
- Kingdom: Animalia
- Phylum: Arthropoda
- Clade: Pancrustacea
- Class: Insecta
- Order: Diptera
- Family: Tachinidae
- Genus: Siphona
- Subgenus: Siphona
- Species: S. setosa

Binomial name
- Siphona setosa Mesnil, 1960

Species of fly

Siphona setosa is a Palearctic species of fly in the family Tachinidae.

== Distribution ==
It is found in Europe and Russia.

== Hosts ==
Eupithecia succenturiata, Allophyes oxyacanthae.
