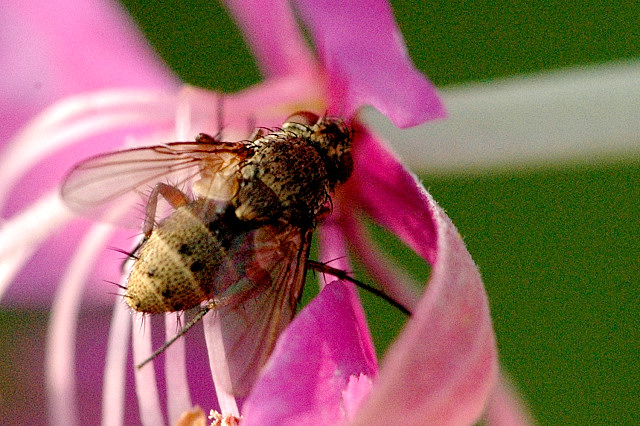

Scientific classification
- Kingdom: Animalia
- Phylum: Arthropoda
- Clade: Pancrustacea
- Class: Insecta
- Order: Diptera
- Family: Tachinidae
- Genus: Siphona
- Subgenus: Ceranthia
- Species: S. lichtwardtiana

Binomial name
- Siphona lichtwardtiana (Villeneuve, 1931)

Synonyms
- Actia lichtwardtiana Villeneuve, 1931

= Siphona lichtwardtiana =

Species of fly

Siphona (Ceranthia) lichtwardtiana is a species of tachinid flies in the subgenus Ceranthia of the family Tachinidae.

== Distribution ==
United Kingdom, Austria, Switzerland, Germany.

== Hosts ==
Eupithecia sp. and Acasis viretata.
