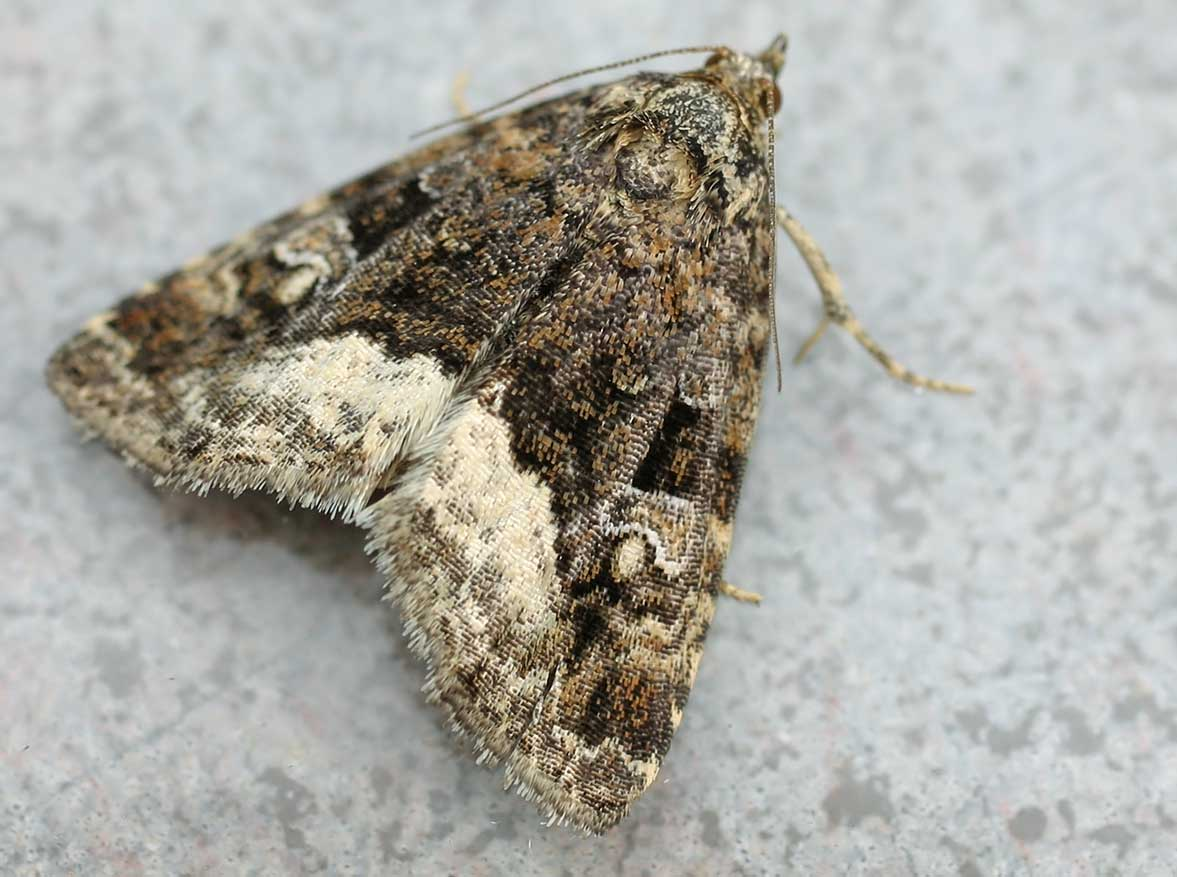

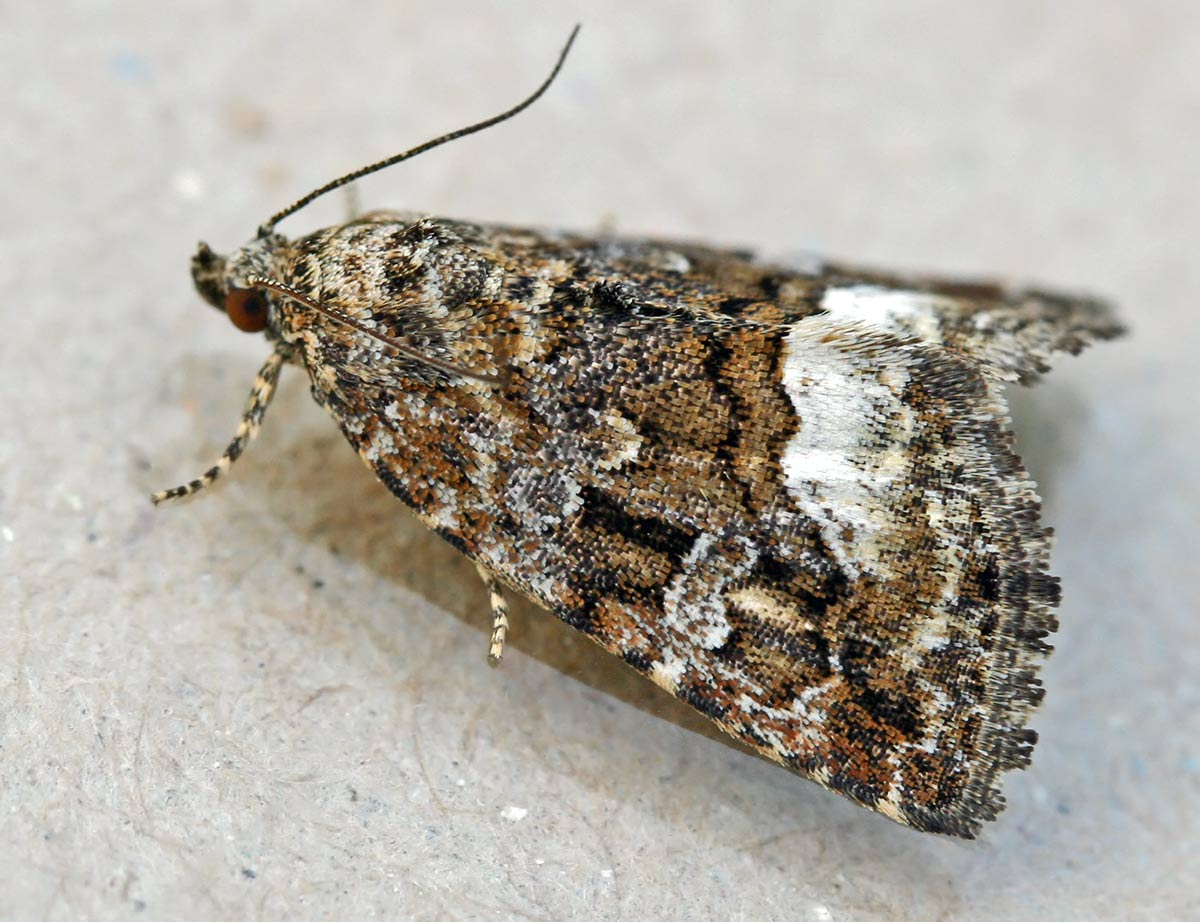

Scientific classification
- Domain: Eukaryota
- Kingdom: Animalia
- Phylum: Arthropoda
- Class: Insecta
- Order: Lepidoptera
- Superfamily: Noctuoidea
- Family: Noctuidae
- Genus: Protodeltote
- Species: P. pygarga

Binomial name
- Protodeltote pygarga (Hufnagel, 1766)

Synonyms
- Phalaena pygarga Hufnagel, 1766; Lithacodia pygarga; Jaspidia pygarga

= Protodeltote pygarga =

Marbled white spot

Species of moth

Protodeltote pygarga, the marbled white spot, is a species of moth of the family Noctuidae. It is found in the Palearctic realm.

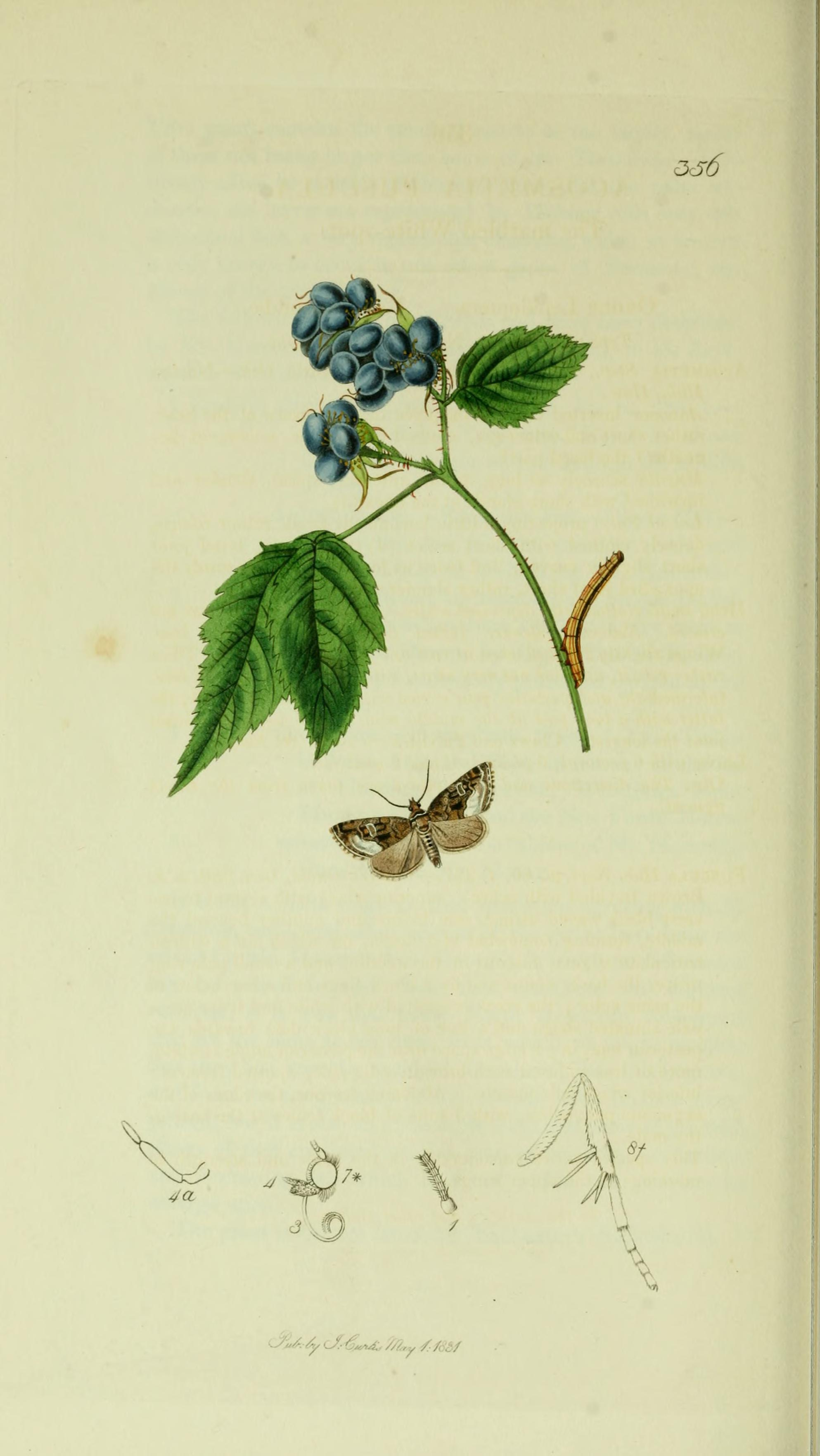
Illustration from John Curtis's British Entomology Volume 5

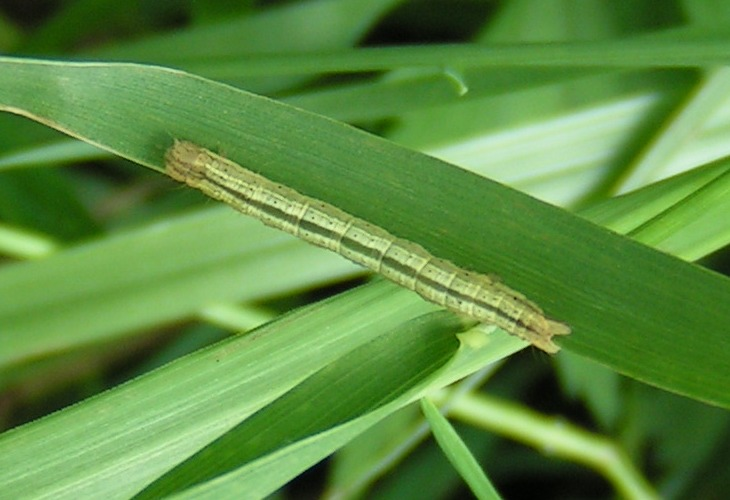
Larva

== Distribution ==
It is found throughout Europe including Scandinavia. In the east the range over Asia minor, northern Iran, Afghanistan, southern Siberia, Central Asia, China then to Sakhalin, Korea, Japan and Taiwan. In the south in the countries bordering the Mediterranean including some islands. It is found up to 1000 m in the Alps.

== Description ==
The wingspan is 20–26 mm. Forewing white, suffused with fuscous and black; inner and outer lines double, blackish; the inner filled in with grey and obscure; the outer with white, strongly excurved beyond cell; stigmata grey, with paler outlines; the orbicular round, the reniform kidney shaped; separated by black scaling, which also follows the reniform; claviform grey brown, edged with white at end, and followed by black scaling; submarginal line pale, preceded by dark shading which thins out towards inner margin; the space beyond outer line in lower half of wing more or less white; hindwing fuscous: the fringe whitish; - in the form albilinea Haw. the dark shading before submarginal line is so strongly developed to inner margin that the white space beyond outer line is reduced to a narrow line from costa to inner margin; in albomarginata Spul., owing to the scanty development of the shading the white reaches costa as a broad band; - in the form gueneei Fallou, from south-west France, the wing is suffused with rufous, or, as Fallou called it, nut brown.

== Biology ==
The moth flies from May to July depending on the location. They prefer moderately moist to dry forest clearings, cut forest, forest fringes, and bush areas. These range from pure hardwood forests to mixed to pure coniferous forests. Also in more open habitats: semi-dry turf, abandoned vineyards, hillsides, quarries and gravel pits.

Larvae are green when young, later yellowish with broad reddish dorsal stripe and several fine reddish lateral lines. They feed on various grasses and can be double brooded in the south.

=== Parasites ===
The larvae are attached by the tachinid fly Ceromya silacea.
