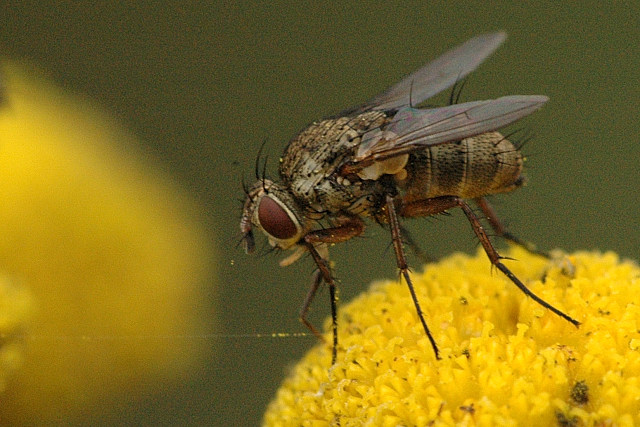

Scientific classification
- Kingdom: Animalia
- Phylum: Arthropoda
- Clade: Pancrustacea
- Class: Insecta
- Order: Diptera
- Family: Tachinidae
- Genus: Siphona
- Subgenus: Siphona
- Species: S. geniculata

Binomial name
- Siphona geniculata (De Geer, 1776)

Synonyms
- Musca geniculata De Geer, 1776; Musca urbanis Harris, 1776; Stomoxys minuta Fabricius, 1805; Bucentes cinereus Latreille, 1809; Siphona analis Meigen, 1824; Siphona cinerea Meigen, 1824; Siphona nigrovittata Meigen, 1824; Siphona tachinaria Meigen, 1824; Siphona pauciseta Mesnil, 1964

= Siphona geniculata =

Species of fly

Siphona geniculata is a Palearctic species of fly in the family Tachinidae.

== Distribution ==
Most of Europe, Russia, Japan.

== Hosts ==
Tipulidae.
