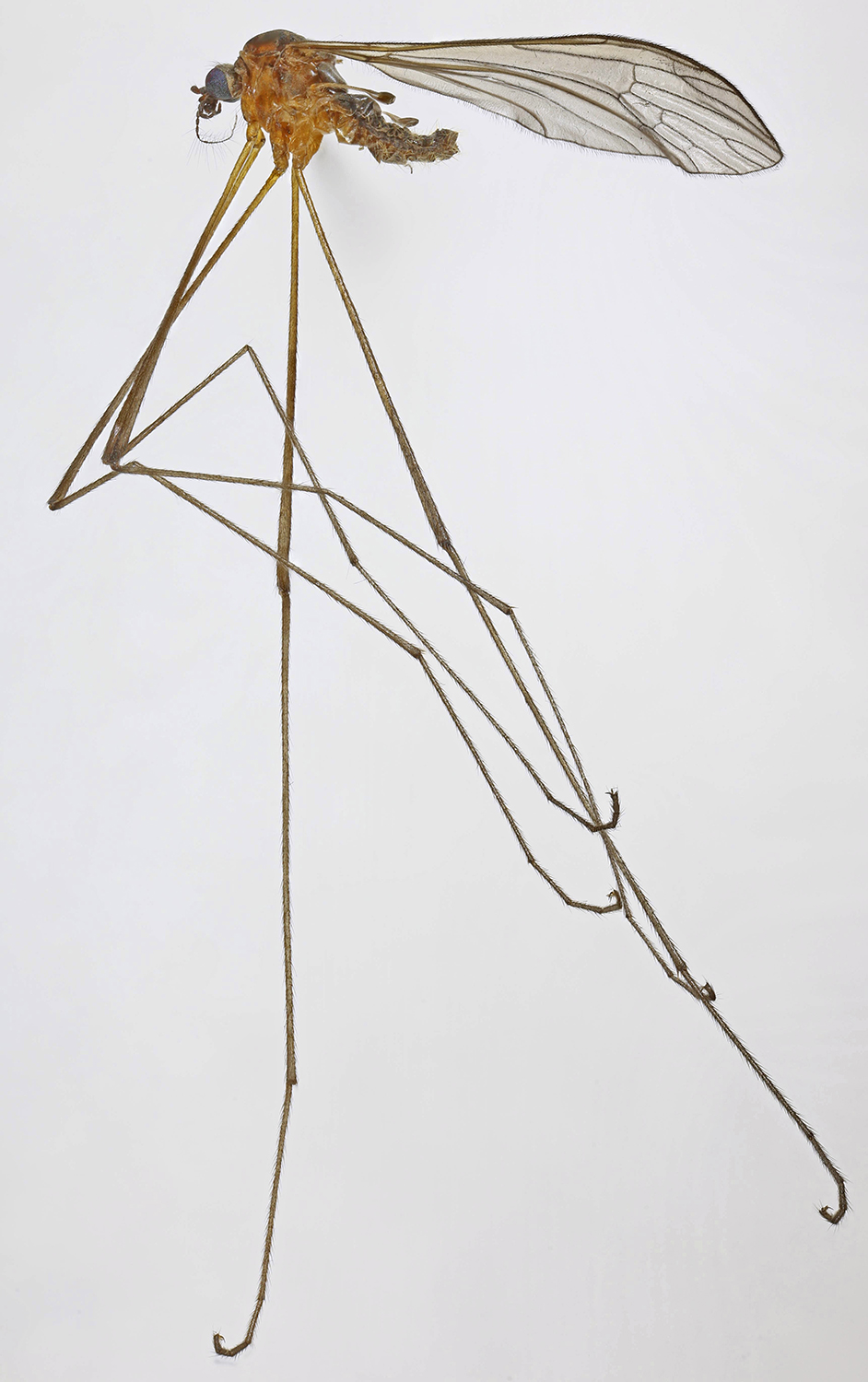
- Pilaria discicollis North Wales

Scientific classification
- Kingdom: Animalia
- Phylum: Arthropoda
- Clade: Pancrustacea
- Class: Insecta
- Order: Diptera
- Family: Limoniidae
- Genus: Pilaria
- Species: P. discicollis

Binomial name
- Pilaria discicollis (Meigen, 1818)

= Pilaria discicollis =

Species of fly

Pilaria discicollis is a species of fly in the family Limoniidae. It is found in the Palearctic.
