= Deltoceromyia =

Scientific classification
- Kingdom: Animalia
- Phylum: Arthropoda
- Class: Insecta
- Order: Diptera
- Family: Tachinidae
- Subfamily: Tachininae
- Tribe: Siphonini
- Genus: Deltoceromyia; Townsend, 1931

Type species
- Deltoceromyia delta Townsend, 1931

Genus of flies

Deltoceromyia is a genus of flies in the family Tachinidae.

== Species ==
- Deltoceromyia delta Townsend, 1931

== Distribution ==
Peru.
