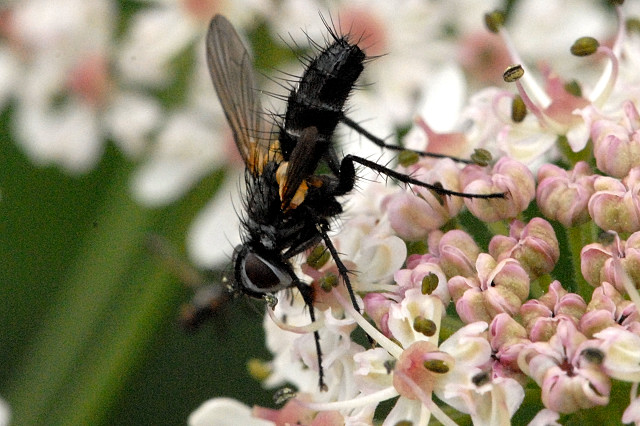
- Phyllomya volvulus

Scientific classification
- Kingdom: Animalia
- Phylum: Arthropoda
- Class: Insecta
- Order: Diptera
- Family: Tachinidae
- Subfamily: Dexiinae
- Tribe: Voriini
- Genus: Phyllomya
- Species: P. volvulus

Binomial name
- Phyllomya volvulus (Fabricius, 1794)

Synonyms
- Musca cylindrica Fallén, 1817; Musca volvulus Fabricius, 1794; Tachina accidens Walker, 1853

= Phyllomya volvulus =

Species of fly

Phyllomya volvulus is a species of fly in the family Tachinidae.

== Distribution ==
British Isles, Czech Republic, Estonia, Hungary, Latvia, Poland, Romania, Slovakia, Ukraine, Denmark, Finland, Norway, Sweden, Bosnia and Herzegovina, Bulgaria, Croatia, Italy, Serbia, Slovenia, Spain, Yugoslavia, Austria, Belgium, France, Germany, Netherlands, Switzerland, Iran, Russia, Transcaucasia.
