= Siphona boreata =

Scientific classification
- Kingdom: Animalia
- Phylum: Arthropoda
- Clade: Pancrustacea
- Class: Insecta
- Order: Diptera
- Family: Tachinidae
- Genus: Siphona
- Subgenus: Siphona
- Species: S. boreata

Binomial name
- Siphona boreata Mesnil, 1960

Species of fly

Siphona boreata is a Palearctic species of fly in the family Tachinidae.

== Distribution ==
British Isles, Czech Republic, Hungary, Lithuania, Poland, Romania, Slovakia, Denmark, Finland, Norway, Sweden, Austria, Belgium, France, Germany, Netherlands, Switzerland, Russia, China.
