= Trichotopteryx =

Scientific classification
- Kingdom: Animalia
- Phylum: Arthropoda
- Class: Insecta
- Order: Diptera
- Family: Tachinidae
- Subfamily: Tachininae
- Tribe: Siphonini
- Genus: Trichotopteryx; Townsend, 1919

Type species
- Trichotopteryx tropica Townsend, 1919

Genus of flies

Trichotopteryx is a genus of flies in the family Tachinidae.

== Species ==
- Trichotopteryx tropica Townsend, 1919

== Distribution ==
Peru.
