= Siphona tenuipalpis =

Scientific classification
- Kingdom: Animalia
- Phylum: Arthropoda
- Clade: Pancrustacea
- Class: Insecta
- Order: Diptera
- Family: Tachinidae
- Genus: Siphona
- Subgenus: Ceranthia
- Species: S. tenuipalpis

Binomial name
- Siphona tenuipalpis (Villeneuve, 1921)

Synonyms
- Actia tenuipalpis Villeneuve, 1921

Species of fly

Siphona (Ceranthia) tenuipalpis is a species of tachinid flies in the subgenus Ceranthia of the family Tachinidae.

== Distribution ==
United Kingdom, Czech Republic, Lithuania, Denmark, Finland, Norway, Sweden, Germany, Russia.
