= Siphona confusa =

Scientific classification
- Kingdom: Animalia
- Phylum: Arthropoda
- Clade: Pancrustacea
- Class: Insecta
- Order: Diptera
- Family: Tachinidae
- Genus: Siphona
- Subgenus: Siphona
- Species: S. confusa

Binomial name
- Siphona confusa Mesnil, 1961

Synonyms
- Siphona mesnili Andersen, 1982

Species of fly

Siphona confusa is a Palearctic species of fly in the family Tachinidae.

== Distribution ==
Europe, Russia, Canary Islands, Israel, Mongolia.
