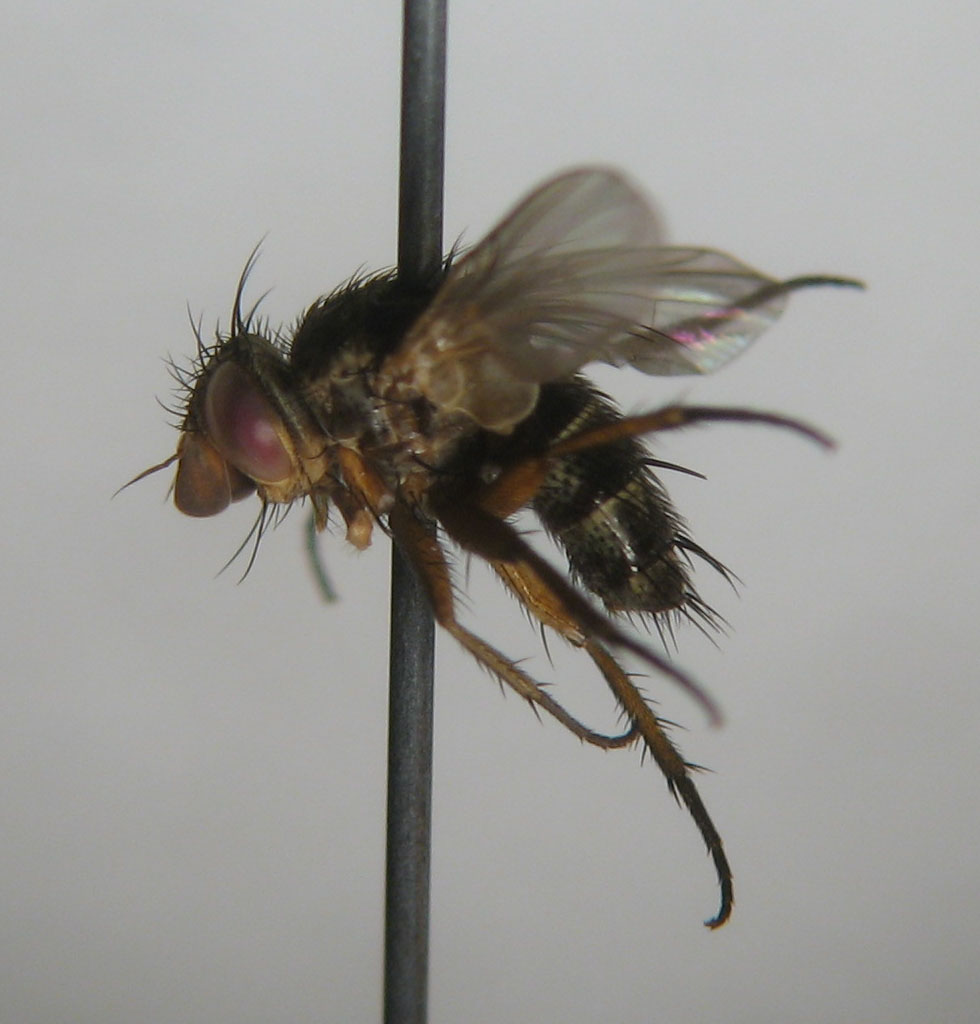
- Siphona verralli

Scientific classification
- Kingdom: Animalia
- Phylum: Arthropoda
- Clade: Pancrustacea
- Class: Insecta
- Order: Diptera
- Family: Tachinidae
- Genus: Siphona
- Subgenus: Aphantorhaphopsis
- Species: S. verralli

Binomial name
- Siphona verralli (Wainwright, 1928)

Synonyms
- Ceranthia verralli Wainwright, 1928

= Siphona verralli =

Species of fly

Siphona (Aphantorhaphopsis) verralli is a Palearctic species of fly in the family Tachinidae.

== Distribution ==
British Isles, Lithuania, Norway, Sweden, Italy, Austria, Germany, Russia.
