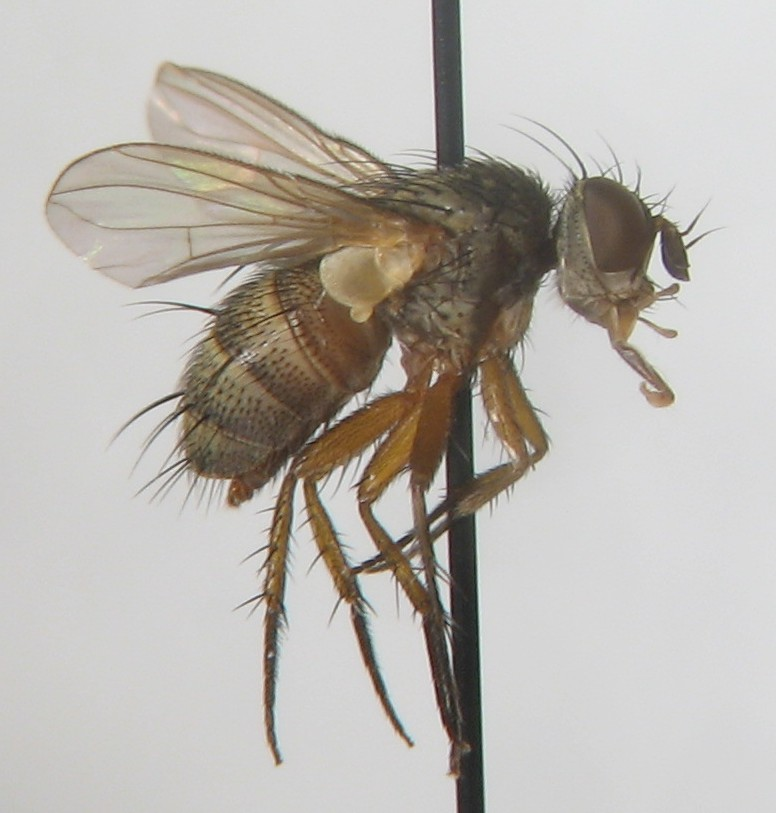
- Siphona siphonoides

Scientific classification
- Kingdom: Animalia
- Phylum: Arthropoda
- Clade: Pancrustacea
- Class: Insecta
- Order: Diptera
- Family: Tachinidae
- Genus: Siphona
- Subgenus: Aphantorhaphopsis; Townsend, 1926

Type species
- Siphona (Aphantorhaphopsis) orientalis Townsend, 1926

Synonyms
- Asiphona Mesnil, 1954

= Aphantorhaphopsis =

Subgenus of flies

Aphantorhaphopsis is a subgenus of flies in the family Tachinidae. Some consider this to be a subgenus of Siphona, most European workers seem content that this is a genus in its own right. They are known from the Palearctic, Afrotropical and Oriental regions.

== Species ==
- Siphona alticola (Mesnil, 1953)
- Siphona angustifrons (Malloch, 1930)
- Siphona brunnescens (Villeneuve, 1921)
- Siphona crassulata (Mesnil, 1953)
- Siphona fera Mesnil, 1954
- Siphona laboriosa (Mesnil, 1957)
- Siphona laticornis (Malloch, 1930
- Siphona nigronitens Mesnil, 1954
- Siphona norma (Malloch, 1929)
- Siphona orientalis (Townsend, 1926)
- Siphona perispoliata (Mesnil, 1953)
- Siphona picturata (Mesnil, 1977)
- Siphona pudica Mesnil, 1954
- Siphona samarensis (Villeneuve, 1921)
- Siphona selangor (Malloch, 1930
- Siphona selecta (Pandellé, 1894)
- Siphona siphonoides (Strobl, 1898)
- Siphona speciosa Mesnil, 1954
- Siphona starkei Mesnil, 1952
- Siphona verralli (Wainwright, 1928)
- Siphona xanthosoma Mesnil, 1954
