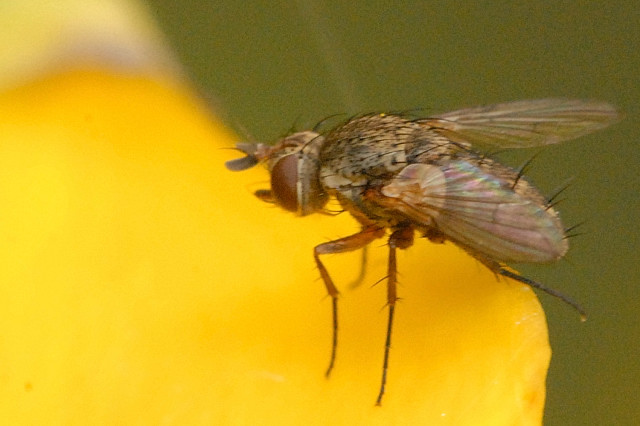

Scientific classification
- Kingdom: Animalia
- Phylum: Arthropoda
- Clade: Pancrustacea
- Class: Insecta
- Order: Diptera
- Family: Tachinidae
- Genus: Siphona
- Subgenus: Siphona
- Species: S. ingerae

Binomial name
- Siphona ingerae Andersen, 1982

= Siphona ingerae =

Species of fly

Siphona ingerae is a Palearctic species of fly in the family Tachinidae.

== Distribution ==
United Kingdom.
