= Siphona tristella =

Scientific classification
- Kingdom: Animalia
- Phylum: Arthropoda
- Clade: Pancrustacea
- Class: Insecta
- Order: Diptera
- Family: Tachinidae
- Genus: Siphona
- Subgenus: Ceranthia
- Species: S. tristella

Binomial name
- Siphona tristella (Herting, 1966)

Synonyms
- Ceranthia tristella Herting, 1966

Species of fly

Siphona (Ceranthia) tristella is a species of tachinid flies in the subgenus Ceranthia of the family Tachinidae.

== Distribution ==
United Kingdom, France, Austria, Czech Republic, Hungary, Norway, Sweden Switzerland. Andorra, Italy, Spain.
