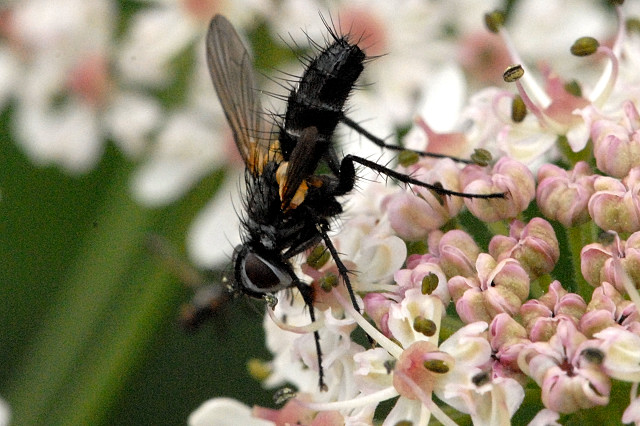
- Phyllomya volvulus

Scientific classification
- Kingdom: Animalia
- Phylum: Arthropoda
- Clade: Pancrustacea
- Class: Insecta
- Order: Diptera
- Family: Tachinidae
- Subfamily: Dexiinae
- Tribe: Voriini
- Genus: Phyllomya; Robineau-Desvoidy, 1830

Type species
- Musca volvulus Fabricius, 1794

Synonyms
- Gibsonomyia Curran, 1925; Metopomintho Townsend, 1927; Neadmontia Townsend, 1912; Ocypterosoma Townsend, 1915; Phyllomyia Macquart, 1835; Pseudomorinia Wulp, 1891; Sericocera Macquart, 1834; Hypostena Meigen, 1838; Melania Meigen, 1838; Phyllomyia Agassiz, 1846; Chorega Gistel, 1848; Melanota Rondani, 1857; Hipostena Rondani, 1861; Cerodesma Enderlein, 1934; Cerodesma Enderlein, 1936

= Phyllomya =

Genus of flies

Phyllomya is a genus of flies in the family Tachinidae.

== Species ==
- Phyllomya albipila Shima & Chao, 1992
- Phyllomya angusta Shima & Chao, 1992
- Phyllomya annularis (Villeneuve, 1937)
- Phyllomya arctogena Shima & Tachi, 2022
- Phyllomya aristalis (Mesnil & Shima, 1978)
- Phyllomya chaoi Shima & Zhang, 2022
- Phyllomya formosana Shima, 1988
- Phyllomya fuscicosta Curran, 1927
- Phyllomya gibsonomyioides Crosskey, 1976
- Phyllomya gymnops (Villeneuve, 1937)
- Phyllomya humilis Shima, 1988
- Phyllomya japonica Shima, 1988
- Phyllomya limata (Coquillett, 1902)
- Phyllomya nigripalpis Liang & Zhang, 2018
- Phyllomya palpalis Shima & Chao, 1992
- Phyllomya pictipennis (Wulp, 1891)
- Phyllomya polita (Coquillett, 1898)
- Phyllomya procera (Meigen, 1824)
- Phyllomya pubiseta (Mesnil, 1953)
- Phyllomya rufiventris Shima & Chao, 1992
- Phyllomya sauteri (Townsend, 1927)
- Phyllomya sichuana Shima & Zhang, 2022
- Phyllomya volvulus (Fabricius, 1794)
- Phyllomya washingtoniana (Bigot, 1889)
