= Galsania =

Scientific classification
- Kingdom: Animalia
- Phylum: Arthropoda
- Class: Insecta
- Order: Diptera
- Family: Tachinidae
- Subfamily: Tachininae
- Tribe: Siphonini
- Genus: Galsania; Richter, 1993

Type species
- Galsania dichaeta Richter, 1993

Genus of flies

Galsania is a genus of flies in the family Tachinidae.

== Species ==
- Galsania dichaeta Richter, 1993

== Distribution ==
Russia.
