= Siphona singularis =

Scientific classification
- Kingdom: Animalia
- Phylum: Arthropoda
- Clade: Pancrustacea
- Class: Insecta
- Order: Diptera
- Family: Tachinidae
- Genus: Siphona
- Subgenus: Actinocrocuta
- Species: S. singularis

Binomial name
- Siphona singularis (Wiedemann, 1830)

Synonyms
- Actinocrocuta chaetosa Townsend, 1935; Tachina singularis Wiedemann, 1830

Species of fly

Siphona singularis is a Neotropical species of tachinid flies in the genus Siphona of the family Tachinidae. It is the type species of the Actinocrocuta subgenus within Siphona.

== Distribution ==
Siphona singularis is distributed widely in the Neotropical realm. It is recorded in Costa Rica, Colombia, Ecuador, Peru, Brazil (Manaus and southeastern region) and Trinidad.
