= Siphona collini =

Scientific classification
- Kingdom: Animalia
- Phylum: Arthropoda
- Clade: Pancrustacea
- Class: Insecta
- Order: Diptera
- Family: Tachinidae
- Genus: Siphona
- Subgenus: Siphona
- Species: S. collini

Binomial name
- Siphona collini Mesnil, 1960

Species of fly

Siphona collini is a Palearctic species of fly in the family Tachinidae.

== Distribution ==
British Isles, Czech Republic, Hungary, Lithuania, Romania, Slovakia, Ukraine, Denmark, Finland, Norway, Sweden, Bulgaria, Italy, Serbia, Spain, Austria, Belgium, France, Germany, Netherlands, Switzerland, Japan, Mongolia, Russia.

== Hosts ==
Noctuidae.
