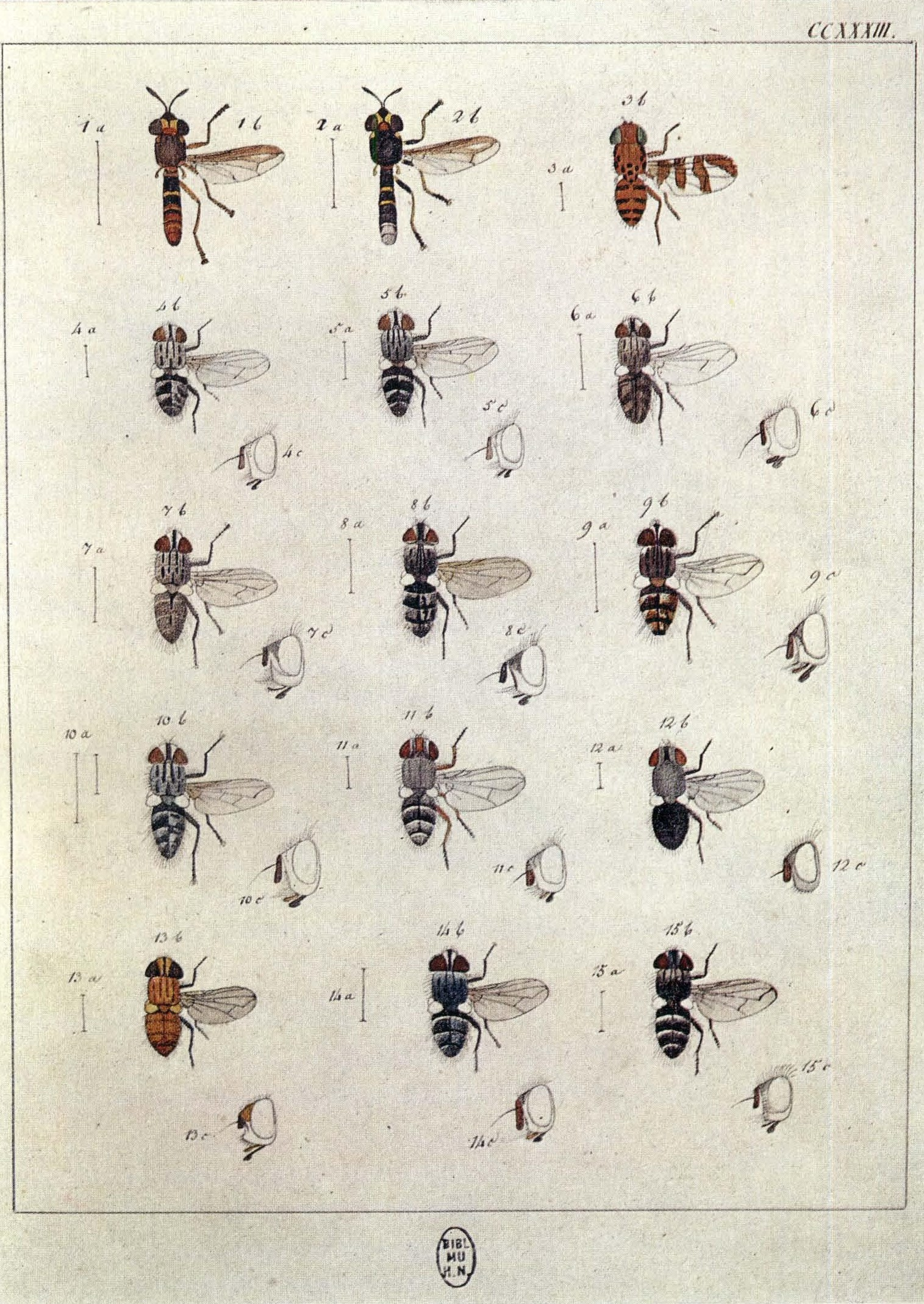
- Goniocera

Scientific classification
- Kingdom: Animalia
- Phylum: Arthropoda
- Clade: Pancrustacea
- Class: Insecta
- Order: Diptera
- Family: Tachinidae
- Subfamily: Tachininae
- Tribe: Siphonini
- Genus: Goniocera; Brauer & von Berganstamm, 1891

Type species
- Goniocera schistacea Brauer & von Berganstamm, 1891

Synonyms
- Cartocometes Aldrich, 1929; Euchaetactia Villeneuve, 1921; Euthryptocera Townsend, 1916

= Goniocera =

Genus of flies

Goniocera is a genus of flies in the family Tachinidae.

== Species ==
- Goniocera io (Aldrich, 1929)
- Goniocera maxima Richter, 1999
- Goniocera montium (Villeneuve, 1921)
- Goniocera schistacea Brauer & von Berganstamm, 1891
- Goniocera versicolor (Fallén, 1820)
