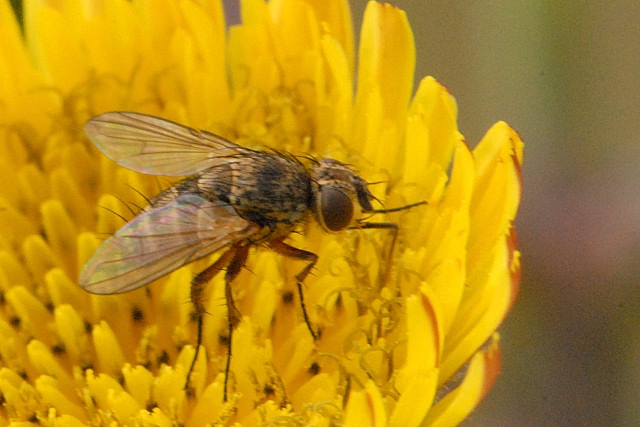
- Siphona cristata

Scientific classification
- Kingdom: Animalia
- Phylum: Arthropoda
- Clade: Pancrustacea
- Class: Insecta
- Order: Diptera
- Family: Tachinidae
- Subfamily: Tachininae
- Tribe: Siphonini; Rondani, 1845

Synonyms
- Actiini; Crocutini

= Siphonini =

Tribe of flies

Siphonini is a tribe of flies in the family Tachinidae.

== Genera ==
- Actia Robineau-Desvoidy, 1830
- Ceromya Robineau-Desvoidy, 1830
- Deltoceromyia Townsend, 1931
- Entomophaga Lioy, 1864
- Galsania Richter, 1993
- Goniocera Brauer & von Bergenstamm, 1891
- Peribaea Robineau-Desvoidy, 1863
- Proceromyia Mesnil, 1957
- Siphona Meigen, 1803

- Actinocrocuta Townsend, 1935
- Aphantorhapha Townsend, 1919
- Aphantorhaphopsis Townsend, 1926
- Baeomyia O’Hara, 1984
- Ceranthia Robineau-Desvoidy, 1830
- Jimimyia Evenhuis, Pont & Whitmore, 20155
- Pseudosiphona Townsend, 1916
- Siphona Meigen, 1803
- Uruactia Townsend, 1927

- Trichotopteryx Townsend, 1919
