= Siphona hokkaidensis =

Scientific classification
- Kingdom: Animalia
- Phylum: Arthropoda
- Clade: Pancrustacea
- Class: Insecta
- Order: Diptera
- Family: Tachinidae
- Genus: Siphona
- Subgenus: Siphona
- Species: S. hokkaidensis

Binomial name
- Siphona hokkaidensis Mesnil, 1957

Species of fly

Siphona hokkaidensis is a Palearctic species of fly in the family Tachinidae.

== Distribution ==
Canada, United States, British Isles, Czech Republic, Lithuania, Poland, Slovakia, Finland, Norway, Sweden, Croatia, Italy, Spain, Austria, France, Germany, Netherlands, Switzerland, Japan, Russia.
