= Entomophaga exoleta =

Scientific classification
- Kingdom: Animalia
- Phylum: Arthropoda
- Class: Insecta
- Order: Diptera
- Family: Tachinidae
- Genus: Entomophaga
- Species: E. exoleta

Binomial name
- Entomophaga exoleta (Meigen, 1824)

Synonyms
- Tachina exoleta Meigen, 1824; Tachina anicula Meigen, 1824

Species of fly

Entomophaga exoleta is a species of tachinid flies in the genus Entomophaga of the family Tachinidae.

== Distribution ==
British Isles, Czech Republic, Hungary, Poland, Slovakia, Ukraine, Greece, Italy, Serbia, Spain, Austria, France, Netherlands, China.
