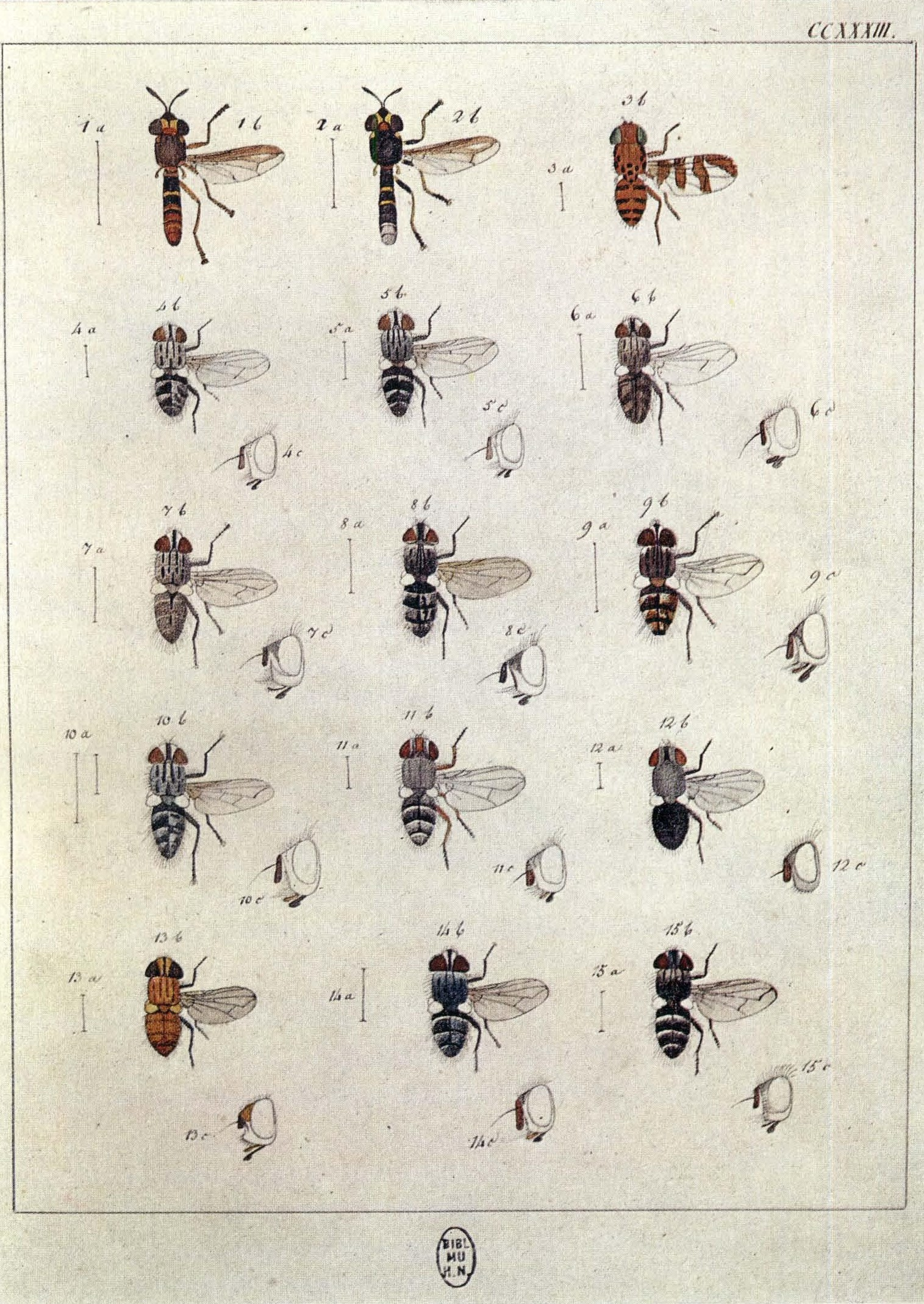
- Illustration in Johann Wilhelm Meigen Europäischen Zweiflügeligen Figure 11

Scientific classification
- Kingdom: Animalia
- Phylum: Arthropoda
- Clade: Pancrustacea
- Class: Insecta
- Order: Diptera
- Family: Tachinidae
- Genus: Goniocera
- Species: G. versicolor

Binomial name
- Goniocera versicolor (Fallén, 1820)

Synonyms
- Tachina versicolor Fallén, 1820; Tachina latifrons Meigen, 1824; Musca hartigii Ratzeburg, 1844; Ceromyia ludibunda Robineau-Desvoidy, 1850

= Goniocera versicolor =

Species of fly

Goniocera versicolor is a Palearctic species of fly in the family Tachinidae.

== Distribution ==
Austria, Germany, United Kingdom, France, Sweden.

== Hosts ==
Malacosoma neustrium, Malacosoma castrense, Aporia crataegi.
