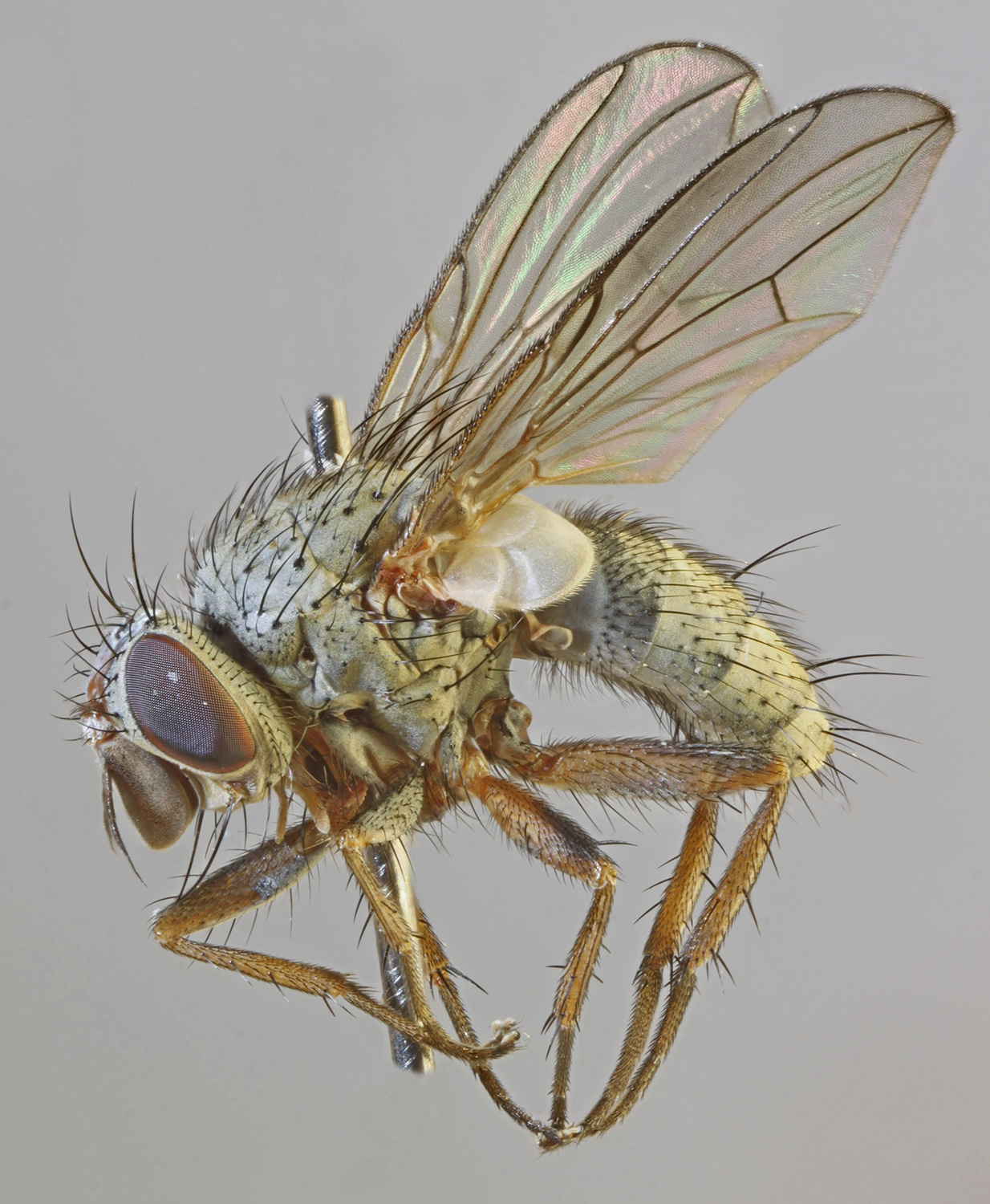

Scientific classification
- Kingdom: Animalia
- Phylum: Arthropoda
- Class: Insecta
- Order: Diptera
- Family: Tachinidae
- Genus: Entomophaga
- Species: E. nigrohalterata

Binomial name
- Entomophaga nigrohalterata (Villeneuve, 1921)

Synonyms
- Actia nigrohalterata Villeneuve, 1921; Actia sufferta Villeneuve, 1942; Actia articulata Stein, 1924

= Entomophaga nigrohalterata =

Species of fly

Entomophaga nigrohalterata is a species of tachinid flies in the genus Entomophaga of the family Tachinidae.

== Distribution ==
British Isles, Czech Republic, Lithuania, Slovakia, Ukraine, Denmark, Norway, Sweden, Andorra, Italy, Portugal, Germany, Netherlands, Switzerland, Japan, South Korea, Russia.
