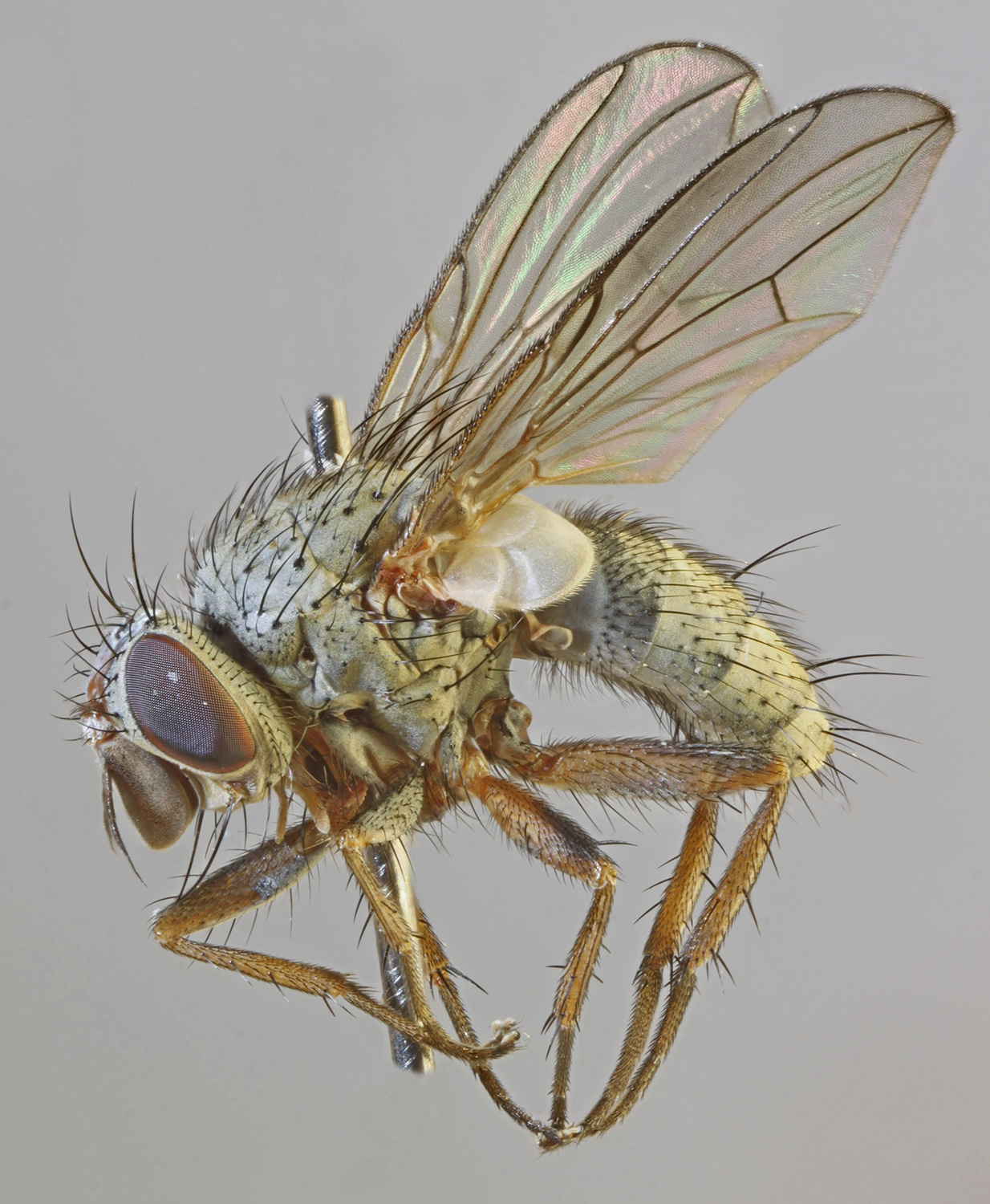
- Entomophaga nigrohalterata

Scientific classification
- Kingdom: Animalia
- Phylum: Arthropoda
- Class: Insecta
- Order: Diptera
- Family: Tachinidae
- Subfamily: Tachininae
- Tribe: Siphonini
- Genus: Entomophaga; Lioy, 1864

Type species
- Tachina exoleta Meigen, 1824

= Entomophaga (fly) =

Genus of flies

Entomophaga is a genus of flies in the family Tachinidae.

It was reviewed by T. Tachi and H. Shima in 2006 and was found to be paraphyletic; it was also found to form a monophyletic group with Proceromyia.

== Species ==
- Entomophaga exoleta (Meigen, 1824)
- Entomophaga nigrohalterata (Villeneuve, 1921)
- Entomophaga ussuriensis Tachi & Shima, 2006
- Entomophaga vernalis Tachi & Shima, 2006
