= Jimimyia =

Scientific classification
- Kingdom: Animalia
- Phylum: Arthropoda
- Clade: Pancrustacea
- Class: Insecta
- Order: Diptera
- Family: Tachinidae
- Genus: Siphona
- Subgenus: Jimimyia; Evenhuis, Pont & Whitmore, 2015

Type species
- Siphona plusiae Coquillett, 1895

Synonyms
- Siphonopsis Townsend, 1916

Subgenus of flies

Jimimyia is a subgenus of flies in the family Tachinidae.

== Species ==
- Siphona brasiliensis (Townsend, 1929)
- Siphona conata (Reinhard, 1959)
- Siphona plusiae Coquillett, 1895
