= Baeomyia =

Scientific classification
- Kingdom: Animalia
- Phylum: Arthropoda
- Clade: Pancrustacea
- Class: Insecta
- Order: Diptera
- Family: Tachinidae
- Genus: Siphona
- Subgenus: Baeomyia; O'Hara, 1984

Type species
- Aphantorhapha hurdi Reinhard, 1959

Subgenus of flies

Baeomyia is a subgenus of flies in the family Tachinidae.

== Species ==
- Siphona antennata (O'Hara, 1984)
- Siphona hurdi (Reinhard, 1959)
- Siphona sonorensis (O'Hara, 1984)
- Siphona xanthogaster (O'Hara, 1984)
