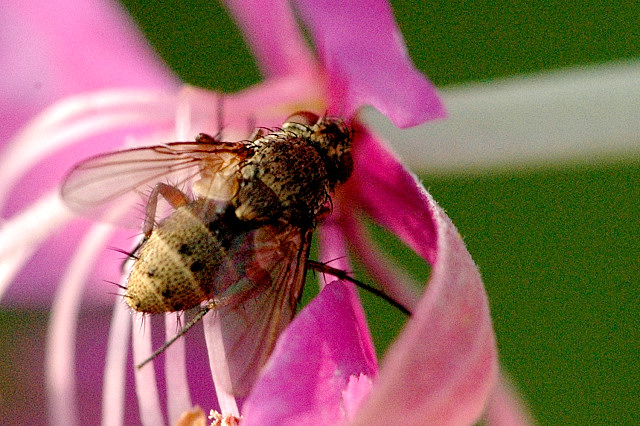
- Siphona (Ceranthia) lichtwardtiana

Scientific classification
- Kingdom: Animalia
- Phylum: Arthropoda
- Clade: Pancrustacea
- Class: Insecta
- Order: Diptera
- Family: Tachinidae
- Genus: Siphona
- Subgenus: Ceranthia; Robineau-Desvoidy, 1830

Type species
- Ceranthia fulvipes (= Ceromya abdominalis Robineau-Desvoidy, 1830) Robineau-Desvoidy, 1830

= Ceranthia =

Subgenus of flies

Ceranthia is a subgenus of flies in the family Tachinidae. Some consider this to be a subgenus of Siphona, most European workers seem content that this is a genus in its own right.

== Species ==
- Siphona abdominalis (Robineau-Desvoidy, 1830)
- Siphona angusta Tachi & Sama, 2005
- Siphona flavipes (Coquillett, 1897)
- Siphona impropria Herting, 1987
- Siphona japonica Mesnil, 1963
- Siphona jocosa (Villeneuve, 1942)
- Siphona lacrymans Mesnil, 1954
- Siphona lichtwardtiana (Villeneuve, 1931)
- Siphona livoricolor Mesnil, 1977
- Siphona nigra Tachi & Sama, 2005
- Siphona pallida Herting, 1959
- Siphona plorans Mesnil, 1954
- Siphona scutellata Mesnil, 1954
- Siphona setigera Tachi & Sama, 2005
- Siphona sulfurea Mesnil, 1971
- Siphona tenuipalpis (Villeneuve, 1921)
- Siphona terrosa Mesnil, 1954
- Siphona tristella Herting, 1966
- Siphona verneri Andersen, 1996
