= Actinocrocuta =

Scientific classification
- Kingdom: Animalia
- Phylum: Arthropoda
- Clade: Pancrustacea
- Class: Insecta
- Order: Diptera
- Family: Tachinidae
- Genus: Siphona
- Subgenus: Actinocrocuta; Townsend, 1935

Type species
- Siphona singularis Wiedemann, 1830

Subgenus of flies

Actinocrocuta is a subgenus of flies in the family Tachinidae.

== Species ==
- Siphona singularis (Wiedemann, 1830)

== Distribution ==
Trinidad and Tobago, Brazil.
