= Pseudosiphona =

Scientific classification
- Kingdom: Animalia
- Phylum: Arthropoda
- Clade: Pancrustacea
- Class: Insecta
- Order: Diptera
- Family: Tachinidae
- Genus: Siphona
- Subgenus: Pseudosiphona; Townsend, 1916

Type species
- Siphona brevirostris Coquillett, 1897

Subgenus of flies

Pseudosiphona is a subgenus of flies in the family Tachinidae.

== Species ==
- Siphona brevirostris Coquillett, 1897
