= Uruactia =

Scientific classification
- Kingdom: Animalia
- Phylum: Arthropoda
- Clade: Pancrustacea
- Class: Insecta
- Order: Diptera
- Family: Tachinidae
- Genus: Siphona
- Subgenus: Uruactia; Townsend, 1927

Type species
- Siphona uruhuasi Townsend, 1927

Subgenus of flies

Uruactia is a subgenus of flies in the family Tachinidae.

== Species ==
- Siphona uruhuasi (Townsend, 1927)

== Distribution ==
Peru.
