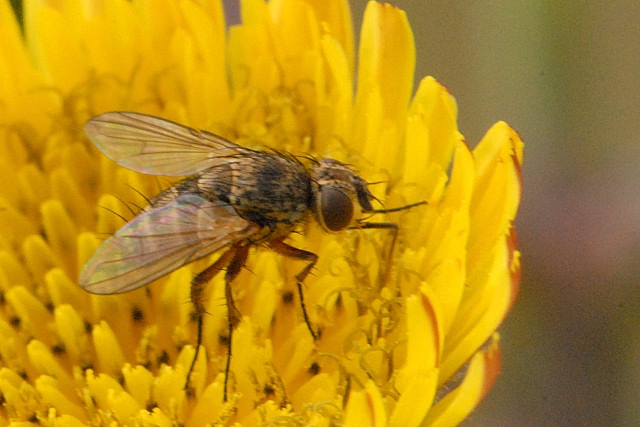

Scientific classification
- Kingdom: Animalia
- Phylum: Arthropoda
- Clade: Pancrustacea
- Class: Insecta
- Order: Diptera
- Family: Tachinidae
- Genus: Siphona
- Subgenus: Siphona
- Species: S. cristata

Binomial name
- Siphona cristata (Fabricius, 1805)

Synonyms
- Stomoxys cristata Fabricius, 1805; Siphona palpina Zetterstedt, 1849; Siphona chetoliga Rondani, 1865

= Siphona cristata =

Species of fly

Siphona cristata is a Palearctic species of fly in the family Tachinidae.

== Distribution ==
Most of Europe, Russia, Japan.

== Hosts ==
Noctuidae.
