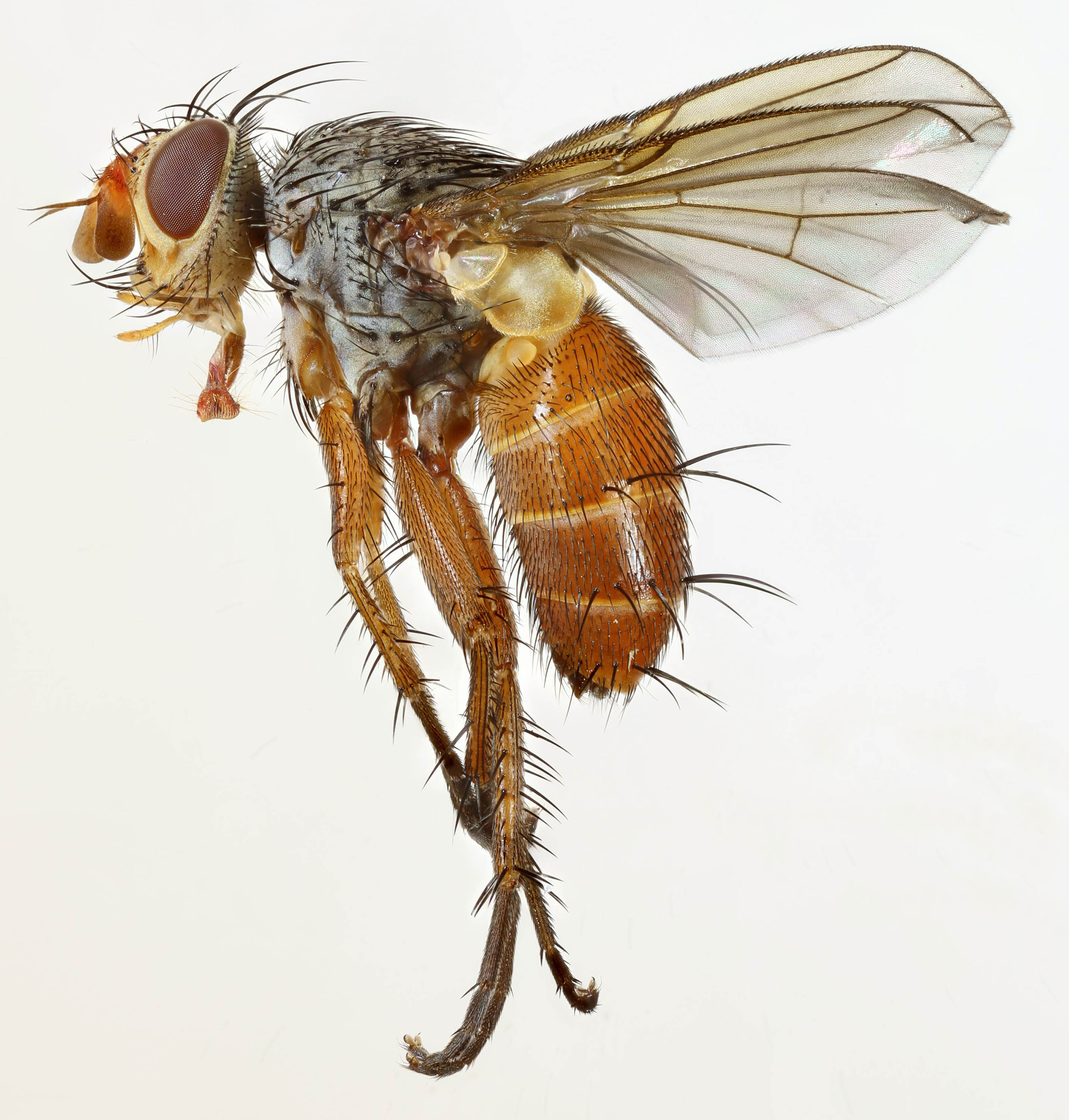
- Ceromya bicolor, Trawscoed, North Wales

Scientific classification
- Kingdom: Animalia
- Phylum: Arthropoda
- Class: Insecta
- Order: Diptera
- Family: Tachinidae
- Subfamily: Tachininae
- Tribe: Siphonini
- Genus: Ceromya; Robineau-Desvoidy, 1830

Type species
- Ceromya testacea Robineau-Desvoidy, 1830

Synonyms
- Ceromyia Agassiz, 1846; Eogymnophthalma Townsend, 1926; Polychaetoneura Walton, 1914; Pseudactia Malloch, 1930; Schizactiana Curran, 1927; Schizoceromyia Townsend, 1926; Stenoparia Stein, 1924; Uschizactia Townsend, 1934; Xanthoactia Townsend, 1919

= Ceromya =

Genus of flies

Ceromya is a genus of flies in the family Tachinidae.

== Species ==
- Ceromya aberrans (Malloch, 1930)
- Ceromya amblycera (Aldrich, 1934)
- Ceromya americana (Townsend, 1892)
- Ceromya amicula Mesnil, 1954
- Ceromya angustifrons (Malloch, 1930)
- Ceromya apicipunctata (Malloch, 1926)
- Ceromya balli O'Hara, 1994
- Ceromya bellina Mesnil, 1957
- Ceromya bicolor (Meigen, 1824)
- Ceromya buccalis (Curran, 1933)
- Ceromya capitata Mesnil, 1957
- Ceromya cephalotes Mesnil, 1957
- Ceromya cibdela (Villeneuve, 1913)
- Ceromya cothurnata Tachi & Shima, 2000
- Ceromya dilecta Herting, 1977
- Ceromya dorsigera Herting, 1967
- Ceromya dubia (Malloch, 1930)
- Ceromya elyii (Walton, 1914)
- Ceromya femorata Mesnil, 1954
- Ceromya fera (Mesnil, 1954)
- Ceromya fergusoni (Bezzi, 1923)
- Ceromya flava O'Hara, 1994
- Ceromya flaviceps (Ratzeburg, 1844)
- Ceromya flaviseta (Villeneuve, 1921)
- Ceromya glaucescens Tachi & Shima, 2000
- Ceromya helvola Tachi & Shima, 2000
- Ceromya hirticeps (Malloch, 1930)
- Ceromya invalida (Malloch, 1930)
- Ceromya kurahashii Tachi & Shima, 2000
- Ceromya laboriosa (Mesnil, 1957)
- Ceromya languidula (Villeneuve, 1913)
- Ceromya languidulina Mesnil, 1977
- Ceromya laticornis (Malloch, 1930)
- Ceromya latipalpis (Malloch, 1930)
- Ceromya lavinia (Curran, 1927)
- Ceromya longimanus (Mesnil, 1957)
- Ceromya lutea (Townsend, 1927)
- Ceromya luteicornis (Curran, 1933)
- Ceromya luteola Tachi & Shima, 2000
- Ceromya maculipennis (Malloch, 1930)
- Ceromya magnicornis (Malloch, 1930)
- Ceromya mellina (Mesnil, 1953)
- Ceromya monstrosicornis (Stein, 1924)
- Ceromya natalensis (Curran, 1927)
- Ceromya nigronitens (Mesnil, 1954)
- Ceromya norma (Malloch, 1929)
- Ceromya occidentalis O'Hara, 1994
- Ceromya ontario (Curran, 1933)
- Ceromya oriens O'Hara, 1994
- Ceromya orientalis (Townsend, 1926)
- Ceromya palloris (Coquillett, 1895)
- Ceromya parviseta (Malloch, 1930)
- Ceromya patellicornis Mesnil, 1957
- Ceromya pendleburyi (Malloch, 1930)
- Ceromya portentosa Mesnil, 1957
- Ceromya prominula Tachi & Shima, 2000
- Ceromya pruniosa Shima, 1970
- Ceromya pudica (Mesnil, 1954)
- Ceromya punctipennis (Malloch, 1930)
- Ceromya punctum (Mesnil, 1953)
- Ceromya rotundicornis (Malloch, 1930)
- Ceromya selangor (Malloch, 1930)
- Ceromya silacea (Meigen, 1824)
- Ceromya speciosa (Mesnil, 1954)
- Ceromya subopaca (Aldrich, 1934)
- Ceromya unicolor (Aldrich, 1934)
- Ceromya valida (Curran, 1927)
- Ceromya varichaeta (Curran, 1927)
- Ceromya xanthosoma (Mesnil, 1954)
