= Aphantorhapha =

Scientific classification
- Kingdom: Animalia
- Phylum: Arthropoda
- Clade: Pancrustacea
- Class: Insecta
- Order: Diptera
- Family: Tachinidae
- Genus: Siphona
- Subgenus: Aphantorhapha; Townsend, 1919

Type species
- Siphona arizonica Townsend, 1919

Subgenus of flies

Aphantorhapha is a subgenus of flies in the family Tachinidae.

== Species ==
- Siphona arizonica Townsend, 1919
- Siphona atoma Reinhard, 1947
