= Rasmus Carl Stæger =

Danish entomologist (1800–1875)

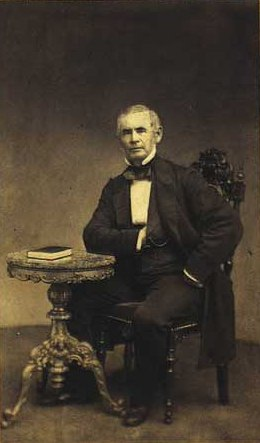
Rasmus Carl Stæger 1861 by Rudolph Striegler

Rasmus Carl Stæger (3 November 1800 – 9 February 1875) was a Danish attorney, civil servant, politician and entomologist.

== Biography ==
Stæger was born and died in Copenhagen, Denmark. He took his legal degree in 1817. Over the course of his career, he served as a judge, elected official and financial advisor to the Danish government in the Bureau of Foreign Payments, National Debt Office and Council of Justice. From 1858 to 1871 he was a member of Frederiksberg Parish Council, from 1859 to 1862 he was deputy chairman and then until 1871 mayor of Frederiksberg.

As an entomologist, his foci were Dolichopodidae, Sepsidae and Chironomidae. Stæger's Diptera collection is in the Natural History Museum of Denmark in Copenhagen.

== Works ==
- Systematisk Fortegnelse over de i Danmark hidtil fundne Diptera (1840)
- Danske Dolichopoder (1842–43)
- Systematisk Fremstilling af den danske Favnas Arter af Antliatslægten Sepsis (1844)
- Grønlands Antliater beskrevne (1845)

== Some Diptera described by Stæger ==
- Sepsis ciliata Sepsidae
- Oxycera falleni Stratiomyidae
- Syrphus hyperboreus Syrphidae
- Siphona strigata Tachinidae
- Dolichopus angustifrons Dolichopodidae
- Sybistroma crinipes Dolichopodidae
