= Louis Pandellé =

French entomologist

Louis Pandellé (1 March 1824, Plaisance, Gers – 27 February 1905, Tarbes) was a French entomologist who specialised in Coleoptera and Diptera.

== Works ==
Partial

- 1869. Études monographique sur les staphylins européens de la tribu des Tachyporini Erichson. Annales de la Société Entomologique de France 9: 261-366
- 1876. Hemisphaera Pandelle nov. gen., pp. 57–59. In S. de Uhagon, ed. Coleopteros de Badajoz. Ann. Soc. Espanola Hist Nat. 5:45-78.
- 1894 Études sur les Muscides de France. Partie 2. Rev Ent Soc Fr Ent (Caen) 14: 287-351.
- 1895 Études sur les Muscides de France. Partie 2. Rev Ent Soc Fr Ent (Caen) 13:1-113.
- 1896. Études sur les Muscides de France. Partie 2. Rev Ent Soc Fr Ent (Caen) 15(1): 1-230.
- 1898 Études sur les Muscides de France. Partie 3 + Catalogue des Muscides de France 1-492 + 41.
- 1898 Études sur les Muscides de France. Partie 3. Rev Ent Soc Fr Ent (Caen) 17: 1-80.
- 1899 Études sur les Muscides de France. Partie 3. Rev Ent Soc Fr Ent (Caen) 18: 81-208.
- 1900 Études sur les Muscides de France. Partie 3. Rev Ent Soc Fr Ent (Caen) 19:221-308.
- 1901 Études sur les Muscides de France. Partie 3. Rev Ent Soc Fr Ent (Caen)20 :335-354.

== Collections ==
Pandelle's insect collection is in the Muséum national d'histoire naturelle in Paris.
