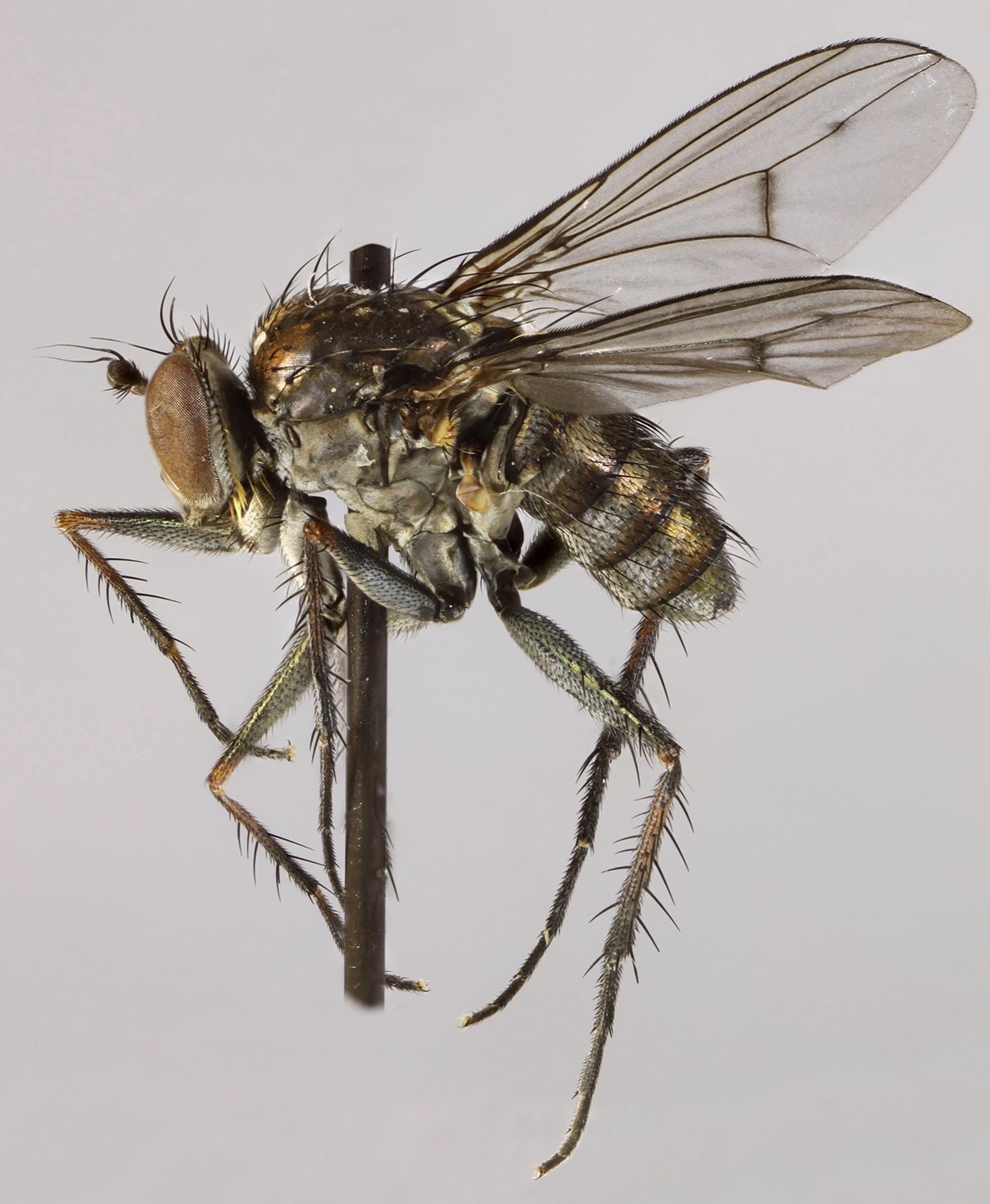
- Tachytrechus notatus

Scientific classification
- Kingdom: Animalia
- Phylum: Arthropoda
- Clade: Pancrustacea
- Class: Insecta
- Order: Diptera
- Family: Dolichopodidae
- Tribe: Tachytrechini
- Genus: Tachytrechus; Haliday in Walker, 1851

Type species
- Ammobates notatus Stannius, 1831

Synonyms
- Ammobates Stannius, 1831 (nec Latreille, 1809); Stannia Rondani, 1857; Hammobates Rondani, 1857 (unjustified emendation of Ammobates); Gongophora Philippi, 1875; Polymedon Osten Sacken, 1877; Macellocerus Mik, 1878 (nec Soiler, 1848); Psilischium Becker, 1922; Gonioneurum Becker, 1922; Syntomoneurum Becker, 1922

= Tachytrechus =

Genus of flies

Tachytrechus is a genus of long-legged flies in the family Dolichopodidae.

== Species ==
These 152 species are members of the genus Tachytrechus.

- Tachytrechus abdominalis (Aldrich, 1902)^{c g}
- Tachytrechus alatus (Becker, 1922)^{c g}
- Tachytrechus albinus (Becker, 1922)^{c g}
- Tachytrechus albitalus (Van Duzee, 1929)^{c g}
- Tachytrechus albiterminalis Van Duzee, 1930^{c g}
- Tachytrechus albonotatus (Loew, 1864)^{i c g}
- Tachytrechus albopilosus (Van Duzee, 1931)^{c g}
- Tachytrechus aldrichi (Van Duzee, 1929)^{c}
- Tachytrechus alternatus Curran, 1924^{c g}
- Tachytrechus ammobates (Haliday, 1851)^{c g}
- Tachytrechus amnoni Grichanov, 2004^{c g}
- Tachytrechus analis (Parent, 1954)^{c g}
- Tachytrechus angulatus (Van Duzee, 1914)^{i c g}
- Tachytrechus angustipennis Loew, 1862^{i c g b}
- Tachytrechus antennatus Van Duzee, 1930^{c g}
- Tachytrechus argentatus (Aldrich, 1901)^{c g}
- Tachytrechus argentimanus (Van Duzee, 1929)^{c g}
- Tachytrechus argentipes Van Duzee, 1930^{c g}
- Tachytrechus argyropus Becker, 1922^{c g}
- Tachytrechus auratus (Aldrich, 1896)^{i c g b}
- Tachytrechus basiserratus Zhang, Yang & Grootaert, 2007^{c g}
- Tachytrechus beckeri Lichtwardt, 1917
- Tachytrechus bellus (Aldrich, 1902)^{c g}
- Tachytrechus binodatus Loew, 1866^{i c g}
- Tachytrechus boliviensis Parent, 1931^{c g}
- Tachytrechus bracteatus (Wiedemann, 1830)^{c g}
- Tachytrechus brittoni Grichanov, 1998^{c g}
- Tachytrechus brooksi Bickel, 2008^{g}
- Tachytrechus californicus (Harmston & Knowlton, 1943)^{i c g}
- Tachytrechus callosus (Becker, 1922)^{c}
- Tachytrechus calyptopygeus Robinson, 1975^{c g}
- Tachytrechus canacolli Brooks, 2004^{c g}
- Tachytrechus castus (Wheeler, 1899)^{i c g}
- Tachytrechus chetiger Parent, 1920^{c g}
- Tachytrechus ciliferus (Becker, 1922)^{c g}
- Tachytrechus clarus Parent, 1927^{c g}
- Tachytrechus compositus Hollis, 1964^{c g}
- Tachytrechus confusus Parent, 1931^{c g}
- Tachytrechus consobrinus (Haliday, 1851)^{c g}
- Tachytrechus costalis (Becker, 1922)^{c g}
- Tachytrechus costaricensis Brooks, 2008^{c g}
- Tachytrechus crassitarsis De Meijere, 1916^{c g}
- Tachytrechus dilaticosta (Van Duzee, 1927)^{i c g}
- Tachytrechus dios Brooks, 2008^{c g}
- Tachytrechus doriae Bezzi, 1925^{c g}
- Tachytrechus elegans Parent, 1933^{c g}
- Tachytrechus eucerus Loew, 1869^{g}
- Tachytrechus excisicornis (Parent, 1930)^{c}
- Tachytrechus facialis (Becker, 1922)^{c g}
- Tachytrechus fedtschenkoi Stackelberg, 1924^{c g}
- Tachytrechus femoralis (Becker, 1922)^{c}
- Tachytrechus flabellifer (Osten Sacken, 1877)^{i c g}
- Tachytrechus flavicornis Naglis, 2011
- Tachytrechus flavimanus (Van Duzee in Curran, 1934)
- Tachytrechus flavitibialis (Van Duzee, 1930)^{i c g}
- Tachytrechus floridensis Aldrich, 1896^{i c g}
- Tachytrechus frontalis (Van Duzee, 1929)^{c}
- Tachytrechus fuscicornis (Aldrich, 1902)^{c g}
- Tachytrechus fuscipennis (Van Duzee, 1931)^{c g}
- Tachytrechus fusiformis (Becker, 1922)^{c g}
- Tachytrechus genualis Loew, 1857^{c g}
- Tachytrechus giganteus (Brooks, 2002)^{c g}
- Tachytrechus goudoti (Macquart, 1842)
- Tachytrechus granditarsus Greene, 1922^{i c g}
- Tachytrechus greenei Foote, Coulson & Robinson, 1965
- Tachytrechus guangxiensis Zhang, Yang & Masunaga, 2004^{c g}
- Tachytrechus guianicus Curran, 1925^{c g}
- Tachytrechus hamatus Loew, 1871^{c g}
- Tachytrechus harmstoni Meuffels & Grootaert, 1999^{c g}
- Tachytrechus humeralis (Aldrich, 1901)^{c g}
- Tachytrechus imperator Curran, 1927^{c g}
- Tachytrechus indianus (Harmston & Knowlton, 1946)^{i c g}
- Tachytrechus indicus Parent, 1934^{c g}
- Tachytrechus insignis (Stannius, 1831)^{c g}
- Tachytrechus insolitus Parent, 1931^{c g}
- Tachytrechus intermedius Becker, 1922^{c g}
- Tachytrechus keiferi (Van Duzee, 1927)
- Tachytrechus kenyensis Parent, 1938^{c g}
- Tachytrechus kowarzi Mik, 1864^{c g}
- Tachytrechus laevigatus (Becker, 1922)^{c g}
- Tachytrechus laticrus Van Duzee, 1918^{i c g}
- Tachytrechus latifacies (Becker, 1922)^{c g}
- Tachytrechus latitarsis Becker, 1922^{c g}
- Tachytrechus latitarsus (Parent, 1929)
- Tachytrechus latitibius (Van Duzee, 1929)^{c g}
- Tachytrechus lindneri Parent, 1933^{c g}
- Tachytrechus longiciliatus (Van Duzee, 1931)^{c g}
- Tachytrechus longifacies (Becker, 1922)^{c g}
- Tachytrechus luteicoxa Parent, 1929^{c g}
- Tachytrechus luteifacies (Parent, 1928)^{c}
- Tachytrechus medinae (Philippi, 1875)^{c g}
- Tachytrechus melaleucus Gerstaecker, 1864^{c g}
- Tachytrechus melanocheirus Van Duzee, 1930^{c g}
- Tachytrechus melanolepis (Bezzi, 1906)^{c g}
- Tachytrechus mesasiaticus Stackelberg, 1934^{c g}
- Tachytrechus milleri Harmston, 1966^{i c g}
- Tachytrechus moechus Loew, 1861^{i c g}
- Tachytrechus mysticus (Becker, 1922)^{i c g}
- Tachytrechus nigrifemoratus (Van Duzee, 1927)^{i c g}
- Tachytrechus nigripes (Aldrich, 1902)^{c g}
- Tachytrechus nimius (Aldrich, 1901)^{i c g}
- Tachytrechus nitidus (Van Duzee, 1927)^{i c g}
- Tachytrechus notatus (Stannius, 1831)
- Tachytrechus novus Parent, 1927^{c g}
- Tachytrechus obtectus Becker, 1922^{c g}
- Tachytrechus ocior Loew, 1869^{c g}
- Tachytrechus olympiae (Aldrich, 1896)^{i c g}
- Tachytrechus partitus (Van Duzee, 1929)^{c g}
- Tachytrechus parvicauda (Van Duzee, 1929)^{c g}
- Tachytrechus perornatus Robinson, 1975^{c g}
- Tachytrechus peruicus Yang & Zhang, 2006^{c g}
- Tachytrechus petraeus Loew, 1871^{c g}
- Tachytrechus planifacies Robinson, 1975^{c g}
- Tachytrechus planitarsis Becker, 1907^{c g}
- Tachytrechus platypus Parent, 1931^{c g}
- Tachytrechus potens (Parent, 1934)^{c g}
- Tachytrechus pressitibia (Parent, 1931)^{c g}
- Tachytrechus protervus Melander, 1900^{i c g}
- Tachytrechus pteropodus Schiner, 1868^{c g}
- Tachytrechus ripicola Loew, 1857^{c g}
- Tachytrechus robustus Lichwardt, 1917
- Tachytrechus rotundipennis Greene, 1922^{i c g}
- Tachytrechus rubiginosus (Van Duzee, 1929)^{c g}
- Tachytrechus rubzovi Negrobov, 1976^{c g}
- Tachytrechus sanus Osten Sacken, 1877^{i c g b}
- Tachytrechus seriatus Robinson, 1975^{c g}
- Tachytrechus setosus (Van Duzee, 1931)^{c g}
- Tachytrechus shannoni (Van Duzee, 1930)^{c g}
- Tachytrechus simplex Parent, 1926^{c g}
- Tachytrechus simulatus Greene, 1922^{i c g}
- Tachytrechus sinicus Stackelberg, 1925^{c g}
- Tachytrechus sogdianus Loew, 1871^{c g}
- Tachytrechus subcostatus (Van Duzee, 1931)^{c}
- Tachytrechus subpubescens (Becker, 1922)^{c g}
- Tachytrechus sumatranus Yang & Zhang, 2006^{c g}
- Tachytrechus superbus Aldrich, 1896^{c g}
- Tachytrechus tahoensis Harmston & Knowlton, 1940^{i c g}
- Tachytrechus tenuiseta Greene, 1922^{i c g}
- Tachytrechus tessellatus (Macquart, 1842)^{c g}
- Tachytrechus theodori Meuffels & Grootaert, 1999^{c g}
- Tachytrechus transitorius Becker, 1917^{c g}
- Tachytrechus transversus (Van Duzee, 1929)^{c}
- Tachytrechus triangularis (Aldrich, 1901)^{c g}
- Tachytrechus tylophorus (Schiner, 1868)^{c g}
- Tachytrechus utahensis Harmston & Knowlton, 1940^{i c g}
- Tachytrechus vanduzeei Robinson, 1975
- Tachytrechus varus (Becker, 1922)^{c g}
- Tachytrechus vinogradovi Stackelberg, 1971^{c g}
- Tachytrechus volitans Melander, 1900^{i c g}
- Tachytrechus vorax Loew, 1861^{i c g b}
- Tachytrechus zumbadoi Brooks, 2008^{c g}

Unrecognised species:

- Tachytrechus contingens (Walker, 1852)^{c g}

The following species were moved to Aphalacrosoma:

- Tachytrechus absarista Wei, 1998^{c g}
- Tachytrechus crypsus Wei, 1998^{c g}
- Tachytrechus crypsusoideus Wei, 1998^{c g}
- Tachytrechus modestus Wei, 1998^{c g}

The following species were moved to Paraclius:

- Tachytrechus americanus (Schiner, 1868)^{c g}
- Tachytrechus inopinatus (Parent, 1934):^{c g}
- Tachytrechus latipes (Aldrich, 1896)^{c g}

Other synonyms:

- Tachytrechus adjaniae Gosseries, 1989:^{c g} Synonym of Tachytrechus intermedius Becker, 1922
- Tachytrechus beckeri (Parent, 1931):^{c g} Renamed to Tachytrechus peruicus Yang & Zhang, 2006
- Tachytrechus bipunctatus (Macquart, 1842):^{c g} Synonym of Tachytrechus intermedius Becker, 1922
- Tachytrechus boharti Harmston, 1968^{i c g}: synonym of Tachytrechus sanus Osten Sacken, 1877
- Tachytrechus bolivianus Yang & Zhang, 2006:^{c g} Synonym of Tachytrechus theodori Meuffels & Grootaert, 1999
- Tachytrechus californicus Harmston & Knowlton, 1963:^{i c g} Renamed to Tachytrechus harmstoni Meuffels & Grootaert, 1999
- Tachytrechus duplicatus Harmston, 1972^{i c g}: synonym of Tachytrechus sanus Osten Sacken, 1877
- Tachytrechus gussakovskii Stackelberg, 1941:^{c g} Synonym of Tachytrechus beckeri Lichtwardt, 1917
- Tachytrechus mchughi Harmston, 1972^{i c g}: synonym of Tachytrechus sanus Osten Sacken, 1877
- Tachytrechus obscuripes Gerstaecker, 1864:^{c g} Var. of Tachytrechus notatus (Stannius, 1831)
- Tachytrechus parenti Robinson, 1970:^{c g} Synonym of Tachytrechus latitarsus (Parent, 1929)
- Tachytrechus pseudonotatus Yang & Zhang, 2006:^{c g} Synonym of Tachytrechus vanduzeei Robinson, 1975
- Tachytrechus robustus (Becker, 1922):^{c g} Renamed to Tachytrechus theodori Meuffels & Grootaert, 1999
- Tachytrechus spinitarsis (Van Duzee, 1924):^{i c g} Synonym of Tachytrechus sanus Osten Sacken, 1877

The following species are listed for the genus by online databases, but are actually placed in other genera:

- Tachytrechus fumipennis (Van Duzee, 1924):^{c g} Actually in Aphrosylus
- Tachytrechus tenuipes (Van Duzee, 1924)^{c g} Actually in Aphrosylus

Data sources: i = ITIS, c = Catalogue of Life, g = GBIF, b = Bugguide.net
