= Corpuscle of Stannius =

Special endocrine organs in the kidney in fish

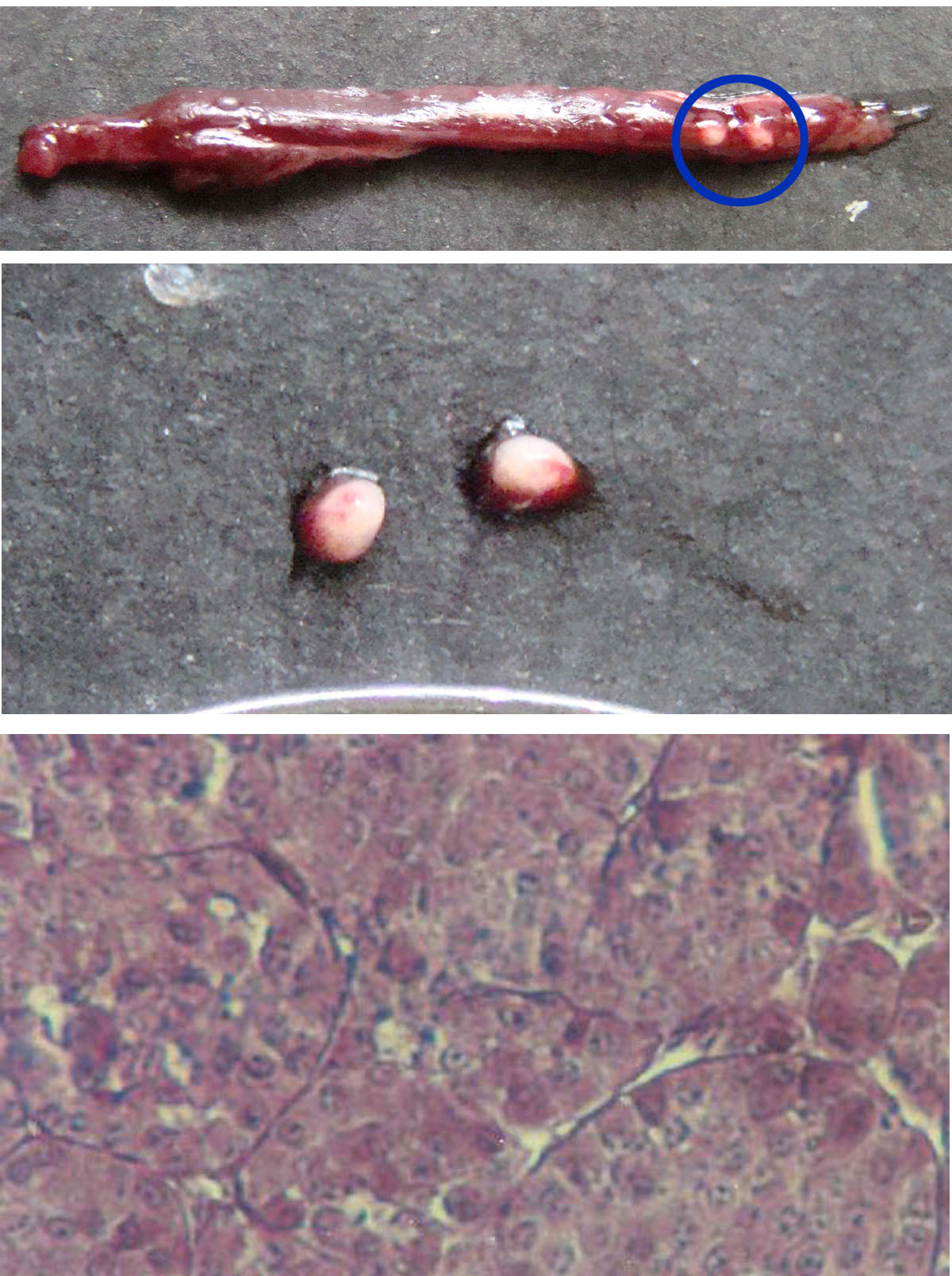
Corpuscles of Stannius (two white spots encircled in blue) embedded in the kidney of Notopterus notopterus (top). Isolated corpuscles (middle). Section of a corpuscle (x 1200) showing secretory cells inside the lobules (bottom)

The corpuscles of Stannius are special endocrine organs in the kidney in fish and are responsible for maintaining calcium balance. They are found only in bony fishes. They were discovered and described by a German anatomist Hermann Friedrich Stannius in 1839. Stannius considered them as functionally similar to adrenal glands in mammals. But they have later been found to be anatomically different as they are derived from different tissues of the embryo. Structurally the corpuscles are a large number of spherical bodies separated from each other by loose connective tissues. Each body or lobule is in turn composed of several columnar cells, which contain secretory granules and are, thus, secretory in function. Each Secretory granule is spherical in shape and measures 0.5 to 1 μm in diameter. Their possible endocrine nature, i.e. producing hormone, was suspected from the complete anatomical description, and it was believed to be responsible for regulating calcium level in the blood. The hormone was identified as stanniocalcin.

== Function ==
Bony fishes obtain calcium directly from their aquatic surrounding (unlike other vertebrates which acquire from diet), so that they require separate endocrine organ. The corpuscles of Stannius are the sites of production of the hormone called stanniocalcin (the mammalian homologue is called stanniocalcin-1 or STC1). This hormone is responsible for decreasing the blood circulating level of calcium. Similar to parathyroid hormone and calcitonin that regulate calcium metabolism in mammals, stanniocalcin is influenced by the level of circulating calcium. When calcium level increases, the corpuscles are stimulated to secrete stanniocalcin.
