= Stanniocalcin =

Family of hormones which regulate calcium and phosphate balance

Stanniocalcin (originally named hypocalcin or teleocalcin or parathyrin) is a family of hormones which regulate calcium and phosphate balance in the body. The first stanniocalcin discovered was from fish and was identified as the principal calcium-reducing (hypocalcaemic) factor. It was isolated from special organs in fish called corpuscles of Stannius, hence the name stanniocalcin. Chemically, stanniocalcins are glycosylated proteins (i.e. proteins containing carbohydrate, or glycoproteins) having a molecular mass of 50 kDa. They exist in molecular pairs (homodimers) and are joined together by disulfide linkage. Stanniocalcins are made up of approximately 250 amino acids.

== Discovery ==
In 1839, the German anatomist Hermann Friedrich Stannius discovered a pair of novel structures inside the kidneys of sturgeon and bony fishes. He believed that they were a kind of adrenal gland (found in mammals) in these fishes. In 1896, the French physiologist A. Petit demonstrated that removal of one of the structures led to degeneration of the other. He suggested that these structures were endocrine organs. In 1908, the Italian zoologist Ercole Giacomini was the first to describe that these structures were present only in fishes which lack a parathyroid gland. He distinguished and named them "posterior interrenal" from the anterior portion of the kidney, which he named "anterior interrenal". A French Physiologist M. Fontaine reported that the corpuscles were responsible for controlling calcium level in the blood. In 1971 Peter K.T. Pang of Yale University showed in the male killifish, Fundulus heteroclitus, that the corpuscles control calcium metabolism. He found that removal of the corpuscle led to development of kidney stone and increase in serum calcium level. By the mid 1970s, it was confirmed that the corpuscles secrete a factor that can reduce calcium level, similar to calcitonin but completely different. and Pang gave the prospective name "hypocalcin". The chemical compound was isolated in 1986 from sockeye salmon (Oncorhynchus nerka), and since it was from a teleost, it was called "teleocalcin". A better isolation was reported in 1988 from different species, including European eel, tilapia, goldfish, and carp. It was realised that both hypocalcin and teleocalcin are the same. It was conclusively shown that the isolated compound was the factor that reduces calcium level in these fishes. In 1990, the exact chemical composition and biosynthesis war worked out, and was given the name "stanniocalcin" as it was found to be exclusively produced by the corpuscles of Stannius. The complete amino acid sequence was described in 1995.

== Structure ==
Stanniocalcin is a glycoprotein that exists in a homodimer, i.e. two similar peptide molecules combined. Each single molecule is made up of 179 amino acids. The peptide sequence is characterised by the presence of 11 half-Cys residues and one N-linked glycosylation site. The actual amino acid sequence and total length differ between species, hence, the molecular weight. In most species it is 54 kDa in size. While it is only 44 kDa in Atlantic salmon. In chum salmon, the homodimer in joined by a single intermonomeric disulfide bond at Cys169. Each monomer in turn contains five intramonomeric disulfide bonds formed between Cys12-Cys26, Cys21-Cys41, Cys32-Cys81, Cys65-Cys95, and Cys102-Cys137. Its synthesis is regulated by the expression of STC (stannioclacin) mRNA. The STC mRNA sequence varies from species to species. For example, in salmon it is approximately 2 kilobases in length and encodes a primary translation product of 256 amino acids. The first 33 residues comprise the pre-pro (inactive form) region of the hormone, whereas the remaining 223 residues make up the mature form of the hormone. One N-linked, glycosylation consensus sequence was identified in the protein coding region as well as an odd number of half cysteine residues, the latter of which would allow for interchain bonding or dimerisation of monomeric subunits.

== Function ==
In bony fishes, stanniocalcin is the principal hormone that regulate calcium level. Even though other calcium-decreasing hormone, calcitonin, is also present, these fishes require more efficient hormone as calcium rapidly enters into their blood through their gills and intestinal wall. Hence, the target sites of stanniocalsin are gill and intestine, where uptake (absorption) of calcium is directly inhibited. Increase in the serum calcium triggers the release of stanniocalcin. Unlike calcitonin, it also regulates phosphate level. It inhibits excretion of phosphate from the kidney.

== Variation in other animals ==
Stanniocalcin was also detected in mammals. In mammals there are two variant forms, STC1, which is fundamentally similar to fish stanniocalcin, and STC2, which is more different in structure and function. In invertebrates, freshwater leeches are found to contain the hormone. In leeches it is produced in the fat cells (adipocytes).

=== STC1 ===
STC1 was discovered in 1995 from human kidney. It was demonstrated that human kidney extract produced the same calcium inhibitory action when injected in a fish. The gene that produce STC1, STC1 is located in the short arm of human chromosome 8 (position p21.2). STC1 mRNA is formed in heart, lung, liver, adrenal gland, prostate, and ovary, indicating that these are the sites of synthesis. Ovary contains the highest level of STC1 mRNA. Fish stanniocalcin and mammalian STC1 are closely related, and are about 50% similar in their structure. They are both responsible for calcium and phosphate balance. In mammals the predominant function of STC1 is to activate phosphate reabsorption in the small intestine and proximal tubules of the kidney.

=== STC2 ===
STC2 was discovered from the human DNA database. In human STC2 is produced by STC2 gene which is located in the long arm of human chromosome 5 (position q35.1). It is very different from STC1 and show only 34% similarity. STC2 mRNA is found in pancreas, kidney, spleen, and skeletal muscles.

== Medical importance ==
Mammalian stanniocalcins are known to be related to cancer development, such as breast and ovarian cancers. In these cancers, both STC1 and STC2 are excessively produced. Their location in chromosomes are the sites of genes for tumour formation. In breast cancer the elevated hormones correspond to increased estrogen receptors. Increased STC1 is specifically linked to other cancer types, including leukemia, colorectal cancer, carcinoma, and lung cancer. STC2 is related to cervical cancer, and ovarian cancer.
