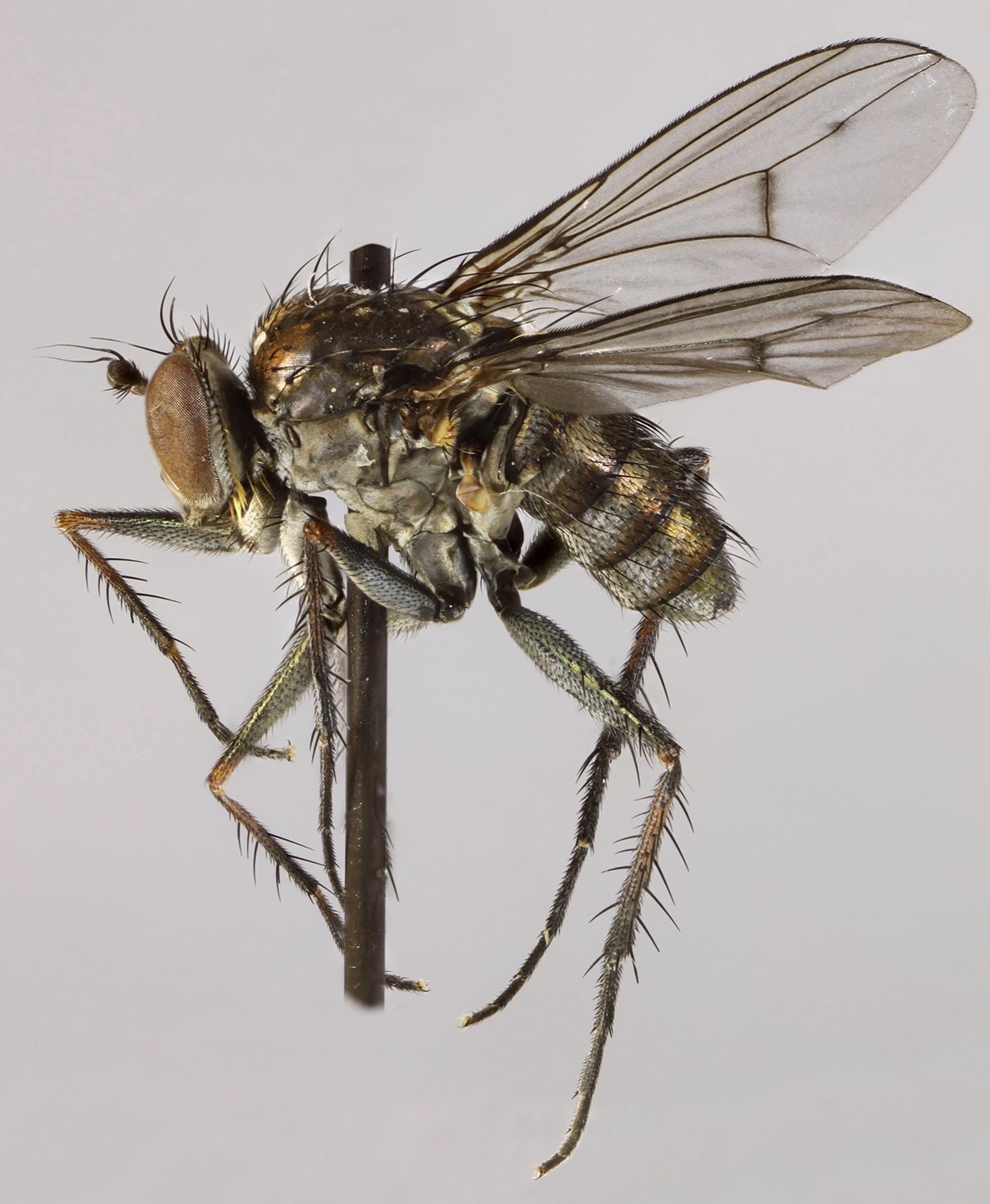
- Tachytrechus notatus North Wales

Scientific classification
- Kingdom: Animalia
- Phylum: Arthropoda
- Clade: Pancrustacea
- Class: Insecta
- Order: Diptera
- Family: Dolichopodidae
- Genus: Tachytrechus
- Species: T. notatus

Binomial name
- Tachytrechus notatus (Stannius, 1831)

Synonyms
- Ammobates notatus Stannius, 1831; Dolichopus litoreus Haliday, 1833; Tachytrechus notatus var. obscuripes Gerstacker, 1864; Hercostomus beckeri Mueller, 1924

= Tachytrechus notatus =

Species of fly

Tachytrechus notatus is a species of fly in the family Dolichopodidae. It is found in the Palearctic.
