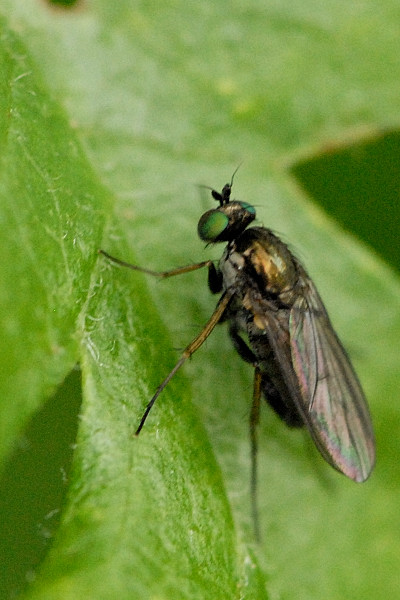
- Gymnopternus cupreus

Scientific classification
- Kingdom: Animalia
- Phylum: Arthropoda
- Class: Insecta
- Order: Diptera
- Family: Dolichopodidae
- Tribe: Dolichopodini
- Genus: Gymnopternus; Loew, 1857

Type species
- Dolichopus cupreus Fallén, 1823

Synonyms
- Paragymnopternus Bigot, 1888

= Gymnopternus =

Genus of flies

Gymnopternus is a genus of flies in the family Dolichopodidae. It was formerly placed as a subgenus of Hercostomus, but is now accepted as a separate genus.

== Species ==
- Gymnopternus aerosus (Fallén, 1823)
- Gymnopternus albiceps Loew, 1861
- Gymnopternus aldrichi Robinson, 1964
- Gymnopternus anarmostus (Melander, 1900)
- Gymnopternus ancistrus (Yang & Yang, 1995)
- Gymnopternus angustifrons (Staeger, 1842)
- Gymnopternus annulatus Van Duzee, 1926
- Gymnopternus annulipes Robinson, 1964
- Gymnopternus anomalocerus Robinson, 1964
- Gymnopternus assimilis (Staeger, 1842)
- Gymnopternus atratus Pollet, Khaghaninia & Kazerani, 2017
- Gymnopternus barbatulus Loew, 1861
- Gymnopternus bariensis Tang, Pan & Yang, 2016
- Gymnopternus bitinctus (Becker, 1922) (nomen dubium)
- Gymnopternus blandulus Parent, 1932
- Gymnopternus blankaartensis (Pollet, 1990)
- Gymnopternus bomiensis (Yang, 1996)
- Gymnopternus brevicornis (Staeger, 1842)
- Gymnopternus brevipes (Van Duzee, 1933)
- Gymnopternus brunneifacies (Robinson, 1960)
- Gymnopternus californicus Van Duzee, 1920
- Gymnopternus campsicnemoides Robinson, 1964
- Gymnopternus celer (Meigen, 1824)
- Gymnopternus collectivus (Yang & Grootaert, 1999)
- Gymnopternus congruens (Becker, 1922)
- Gymnopternus consanguineus (Harmston, 1952)
- Gymnopternus constrictus Robinson, 1964
- Gymnopternus coxalis Loew, 1864
- Gymnopternus crassicauda Loew, 1861
- Gymnopternus crassisetosus (Yang & Saigusa, 2001)
- Gymnopternus cumberlandensis Robinson, 1964
- Gymnopternus cuneicornis Robinson, 1964
- Gymnopternus cupreus (Fallén, 1823)
- Gymnopternus currani (Van Duzee, 1930)
- Gymnopternus curvatus (Yang, 1997)
- Gymnopternus daubichensis (Stackelberg, 1933)
- Gymnopternus debilis Loew, 1861
- Gymnopternus despicatus Loew, 1861
- Gymnopternus difficillis Loew, 1861
- Gymnopternus dorsalis (Yang & Saigusa, 2001)
- Gymnopternus exilis Loew, 1861
- Gymnopternus fimbriatus Loew, 1861
- Gymnopternus flaccus (Wei, 1997)
- Gymnopternus flaviciliatus Van Duzee, 1914
- Gymnopternus flavitarsis (Van Duzee, 1925)
- Gymnopternus flavitibia Pollet, Khaghaninia & Kazerani, 2017
- Gymnopternus flaviventris Robinson, 1964
- Gymnopternus flavus Loew, 1861
- Gymnopternus floridensis Robinson, 1964
- Gymnopternus frequens Loew, 1861
- Gymnopternus fujianensis (Yang & Yang, 2003)
- Gymnopternus fushanensis Zhang & Yang, 2011
- Gymnopternus ghufrani Grootaert, 2020
- Gymnopternus grandis (Yang & Yang, 1995)
- Gymnopternus gregalis (Becker, 1922)
- Gymnopternus guangdongensis (Zhang, Yang & Grootaert, 2003)
- Gymnopternus guangxiensis (Yang, 1997)
- Gymnopternus helveticus Pollet & Rampazzi, 2004
- Gymnopternus humilis Loew, 1864
- Gymnopternus hybridus Robinson, 1964
- Gymnopternus hygrus (Wei, 1997)
- Gymnopternus jiangi Zhang & Yang, 2011
- Gymnopternus jishanensis (Wei, 1997)
- Gymnopternus klowdeni (Olejníček, 2002)
- Gymnopternus kurtus (Wei & Song, 2006)
- Gymnopternus labilis (Wei & Song, 2006)
- Gymnopternus lacus (Wei & Song, 2006)
- †Gymnopternus lacustris Bickel, 1995
- Gymnopternus laevigatus Loew, 1861
- Gymnopternus laffooni Robinson, 1964
- Gymnopternus latapicalis (Yang & Saigusa, 2001)
- Gymnopternus lividifrons Van Duzee, 1926
- Gymnopternus longipennis Tang, Pan & Yang, 2016
- Gymnopternus lunifer Loew, 1861
- Gymnopternus maculiventris (Van Duzee, 1925)
- Gymnopternus medivalvis (Yang, 2001)
- Gymnopternus meihuapuensis (Yang & Saigusa, 2001)
- Gymnopternus meniscoides Robinson, 1964
- Gymnopternus meniscus Loew, 1864
- Gymnopternus metallicus (Stannius, 1831)
- Gymnopternus meuffelsi (Olejníček, 2003)
- Gymnopternus minutus Loew, 1861
- Gymnopternus mirificus Melander, 1900
- Gymnopternus nemorum (Smirnov & Negrobov, 1977)
- Gymnopternus niger (Yang & Saigusa, 2001)
- Gymnopternus nigribarbus Loew, 1861
- Gymnopternus nigricomus Robinson, 1964
- Gymnopternus nigricoxa Van Duzee, 1924
- Gymnopternus nigrifacies (Van Duzee, 1933)
- Gymnopternus novus (Parent, 1926)
- Gymnopternus obscurus (Say, 1823)
- Gymnopternus obtusicauda Van Duzee, 1924
- Gymnopternus ohioensis Robinson, 1964
- Gymnopternus opacus Loew, 1861
- Gymnopternus ovaticornis (Van Duzee, 1933)
- Gymnopternus oxanae (Olejníček, 2004)
- Gymnopternus pallidiciliatus (Van Duzee, 1930)
- Gymnopternus parvicornis Loew, 1861
- Gymnopternus petilus (Yang & Saigusa, 1999)
- Gymnopternus pingbianensis (Yang & Saigusa, 2001)
- Gymnopternus politus Loew, 1861
- Gymnopternus populus (Wei, 1997)
- Gymnopternus portentosus (Wei, 1997)
- Gymnopternus prominulus (Wei, 1997)
- Gymnopternus propriofacies Robinson, 1964
- Gymnopternus prorsus (Wei, 1997)
- Gymnopternus pseudoceler (Stackelberg, 1934)
- Gymnopternus pseudodebilis Robinson, 1964
- Gymnopternus pugnaceus Robinson & Knowles, 2008
- Gymnopternus purus (Harmston & Knowlton, 1963)
- Gymnopternus pusillus Loew, 1864
- Gymnopternus robustus (Van Duzee, 1925)
- Gymnopternus rohdendorfi (Stackelberg, 1933)
- Gymnopternus rollei (Parent, 1941)
- Gymnopternus schlingeri (Harmston & Knowlton, 1963)
- Gymnopternus scotias Loew, 1861
- Gymnopternus shandonganus (Yang, 1996)
- Gymnopternus sharpi Robinson, 1964
- Gymnopternus sheni Zhang & Yang, 2008
- Gymnopternus shimentaiensis (Zhang, Yang & Grootaert, 2003)
- Gymnopternus silvestris (Pollet, 1990)
- Gymnopternus singularis Van Duzee, 1924
- Gymnopternus singulus (Wei, 1997)
- Gymnopternus solanus (Wei, 1997)
- Gymnopternus spectabilis Loew, 1861
- Gymnopternus subdilatatus Loew, 1861
- Gymnopternus submalthinus (Olejníček, 2003)
- Gymnopternus subpopulus (Wei, 1997)
- Gymnopternus subulatus Loew, 1861
- Gymnopternus tennesseensis Robinson, 1964
- Gymnopternus tenuicauda Van Duzee, 1928
- Gymnopternus tenuilobus (Yang & Grootaert, 1999)
- Gymnopternus tibialis Van Duzee, 1928
- Gymnopternus tristis Loew, 1864
- Gymnopternus ussurianus (Stackelberg, 1933)
- Gymnopternus ventralis Loew, 1861
- Gymnopternus vernaculus Van Duzee, 1924
- Gymnopternus vetitus (Melander, 1900)
- Gymnopternus vockerothi Robinson, 1964
- Gymnopternus weemsi Robinson, 1964
- Gymnopternus yatai (Yang & Saigusa, 2001)
- Gymnopternus zhuae Zhang & Yang, 2011
