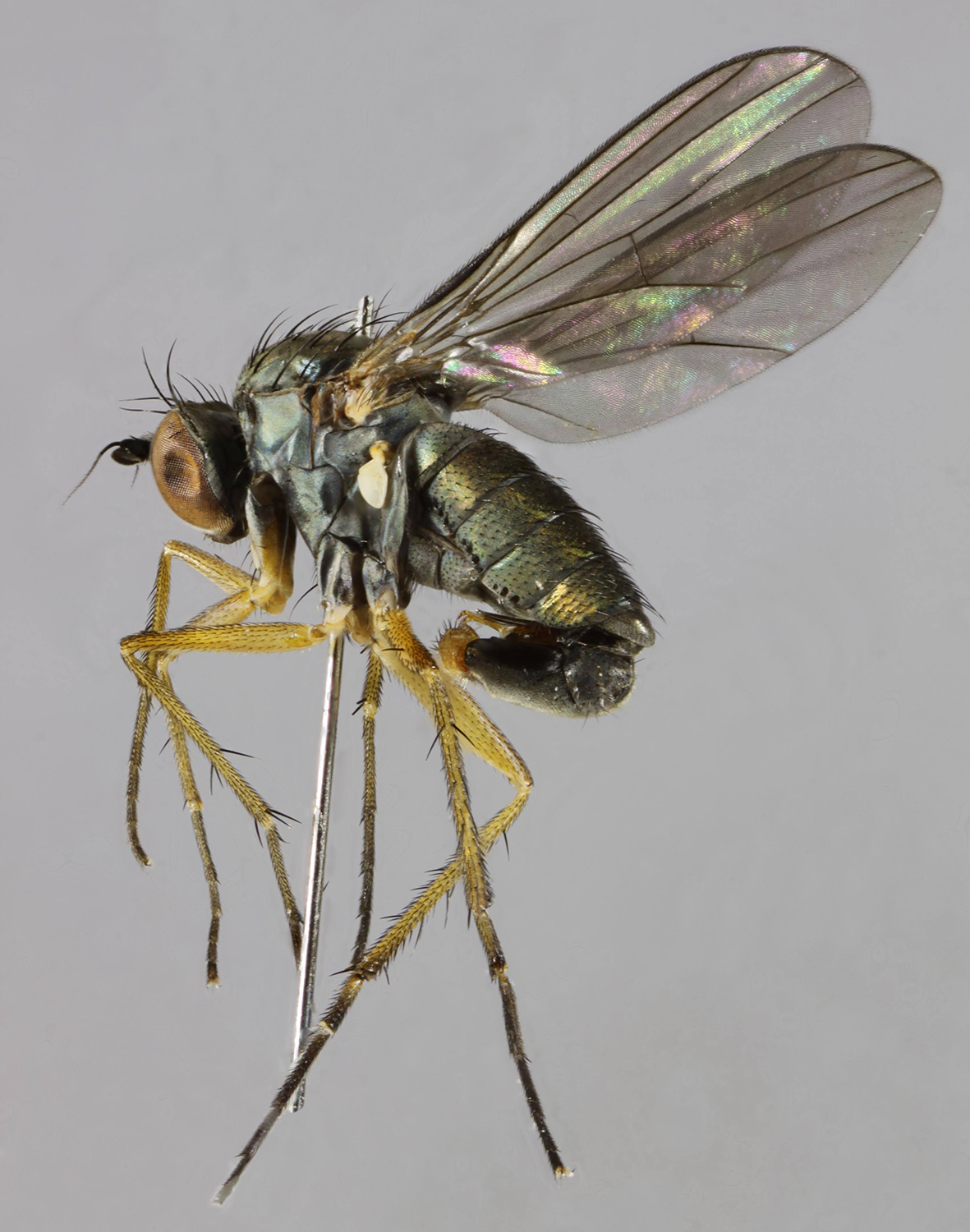
- Gymnopternus celer North Wales

Scientific classification
- Kingdom: Animalia
- Phylum: Arthropoda
- Clade: Pancrustacea
- Class: Insecta
- Order: Diptera
- Family: Dolichopodidae
- Genus: Gymnopternus
- Species: G. celer

Binomial name
- Gymnopternus celer (Meigen, 1824)

Synonyms
- Dolichopus celer Meigen, 1824; Dolichopus microcerus Meigen, 1824; Dolichopus sarus Haliday, 1832; Gymnopternus microcerus (Meigen, 1824); Gymnopternus sarus (Haliday, 1832); Hercostomus celer (Meigen, 1824); Hercostomus microcerus (Meigen, 1824); Hercostomus sarus (Haliday, 1832)

= Gymnopternus celer =

Species of fly

Gymnopternus celer is a species of fly in the family Dolichopodidae. It is found in the Palearctic.
