= Tachytrechus sanus =

Scientific classification
- Kingdom: Animalia
- Phylum: Arthropoda
- Clade: Pancrustacea
- Class: Insecta
- Order: Diptera
- Family: Dolichopodidae
- Genus: Tachytrechus
- Species: T. sanus

Binomial name
- Tachytrechus sanus Osten Sacken, 1877

Synonyms
- Tachytrechus spinitarsis Van Duzee, 1924; Tachytrechus boharti Harmston, 1968; Tachytrechus duplicatus Harmston, 1972; Tachytrechus mchughi Harmston, 1972

Species of fly

Tachytrechus sanus is a species of long-legged fly in the family Dolichopodidae.
