= Gymnopternus currani =

Scientific classification
- Kingdom: Animalia
- Phylum: Arthropoda
- Clade: Pancrustacea
- Class: Insecta
- Order: Diptera
- Family: Dolichopodidae
- Genus: Gymnopternus
- Species: G. currani

Binomial name
- Gymnopternus currani (Van Duzee, 1930)

Synonyms
- Hercostomus currani Van Duzee, 1930

Species of fly

Gymnopternus currani is a species of long-legged fly in the family Dolichopodidae.
