= STC2 =

Protein-coding gene in the species Homo sapiens

Identifiers
- Aliases: STC2, STC-2, STCRP, stanniocalcin 2
- External IDs: OMIM: 603665; MGI: 1316731; GeneCards: STC2

Gene location (Human)
Chr.	Chromosome 5 (human)
Band	5q35.2	Start	173,314,723 bp
Band	5q35.2	End	173,328,447 bp

Gene location (Mouse)
Chr.	Chromosome 11 (mouse)
Band	11|11 A4	Start	31,307,307 bp
Band	11|11 A4	End	31,320,074 bp
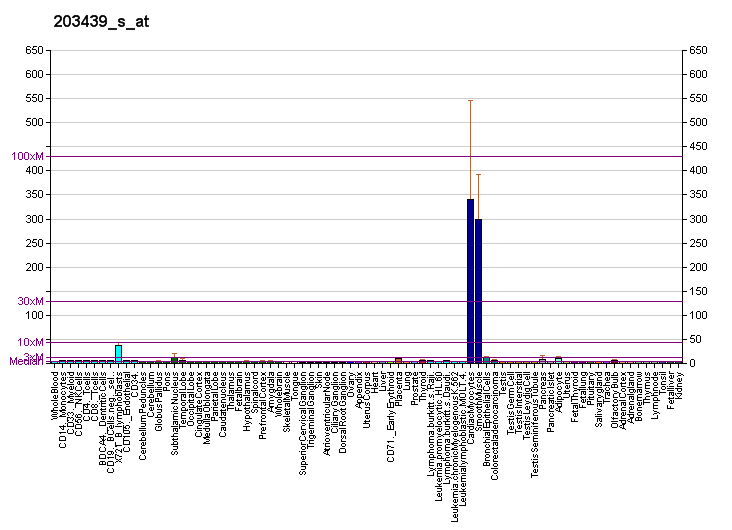

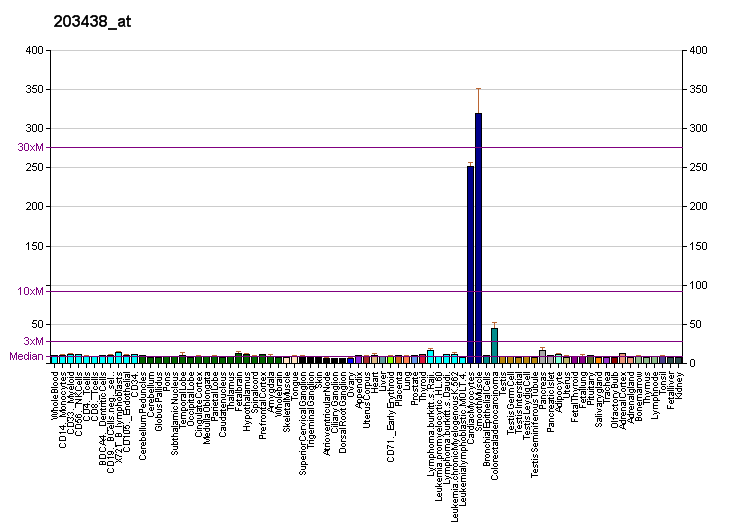
RNA expression pattern
Bgee	Human / Mouse (ortholog); Top expressed in: stromal cell of endometrium; tibia; epithelium of lactiferous gland; lactiferous duct; body of pancreas; cartilage tissue; Achilles tendon; right auricle of heart; upper lobe of left lung; placenta / Top expressed in: aortic valve; ascending aorta; lumbar subsegment of spinal cord; tail of embryo; gastrula; parietal layer of glomerular capsule; muscle of thigh; lactiferous gland; lumbar spinal ganglion; submandibular gland; More reference expression data
BioGPS	More reference expression data
Gene ontology
Molecular function	protein homodimerization activity; hormone activity; heme binding; enzyme binding
Cellular component	Golgi apparatus; extracellular region; endoplasmic reticulum; perinuclear region of cytoplasm; extracellular space; endoplasmic reticulum lumen
Biological process	response to vitamin D; calcium ion homeostasis; negative regulation of multicellular organism growth; response to peptide hormone; cellular calcium ion homeostasis; regulation of hormone biosynthetic process; response to oxidative stress; negative regulation of gene expression; response to endoplasmic reticulum stress; endoplasmic reticulum unfolded protein response; decidualization; regulation of store-operated calcium entry; cellular response to hypoxia; embryo implantation; post-translational protein modification; regulation of signaling receptor activity
Sources:Amigo / QuickGO
Orthologs
Databases	NCBI: entry; OMA: entry
Species	Human	Mouse
Entrez	8614	20856
Ensembl	ENSG00000113739	ENSMUSG00000020303
UniProt	O76061	O88452
RefSeq (mRNA)	NM_003714	NM_011491
RefSeq (protein)	NP_003705	NP_035621
Location (UCSC)	Chr 5: 173.31 – 173.33 Mb	Chr 11: 31.31 – 31.32 Mb
PubMed search
- Wikidata
View/Edit Human	View/Edit Mouse

Stanniocalcin-2 is a protein that in humans is encoded by the STC2 gene.

This gene encodes a secreted, homodimeric glycoprotein that is expressed in a wide variety of tissues and may have autocrine or paracrine functions. The encoded protein has 10 of its 15 cysteine residues conserved among stanniocalcin family members and is phosphorylated by casein kinase 2 exclusively on its serine residues.

Its C-terminus contains a cluster of histidine residues which may interact with metal ions. The protein may play a role in the regulation of renal and intestinal calcium and phosphate transport, cell metabolism, or cellular calcium/phosphate homeostasis. Constitutive overexpression of human stanniocalcin 2 in mice resulted in pre-and postnatal growth restriction, reduced bone and skeletal muscle growth, and organomegaly. Expression of this gene is induced by estrogen and altered in some breast cancers.

Stanniocalcin reduces bone growth by modulating the activity of IGF1. One mechanism of IGF1 regulation is through IGFBP4 binding it in an inactive state. The protease PAPPA can then cleave this complex, releasing bioactive IGF1. Stanniocalcin inhibits the activity of PAPPA in releasing active IGF1 through itself binding PAPPA, thus preventing the release of active IGF1.

Differences in stanniocalcin expression have been directly linked to changes in skeletal size in a variety of species. For example, laboratory mice lacking STC2 are 10 to 15% larger than wild-type mice, while mice expressing STC2 at elevated levels are 45% smaller. In humans, the largest known coding variant affecting human height is a rare mutation reducing STC2 activity, yielding a 2 cm height increase in heterozygous carriers. Additionally, domestic dog size is strongly predicted by a variant immediately adjacent to STC2, with almost all small dogs carrying a derived allele at this locus. A further striking example is the stickleback, different populations of which have either increased or decreased the length of their dorsal and pelvic spines through modulation of STC2 expression.
