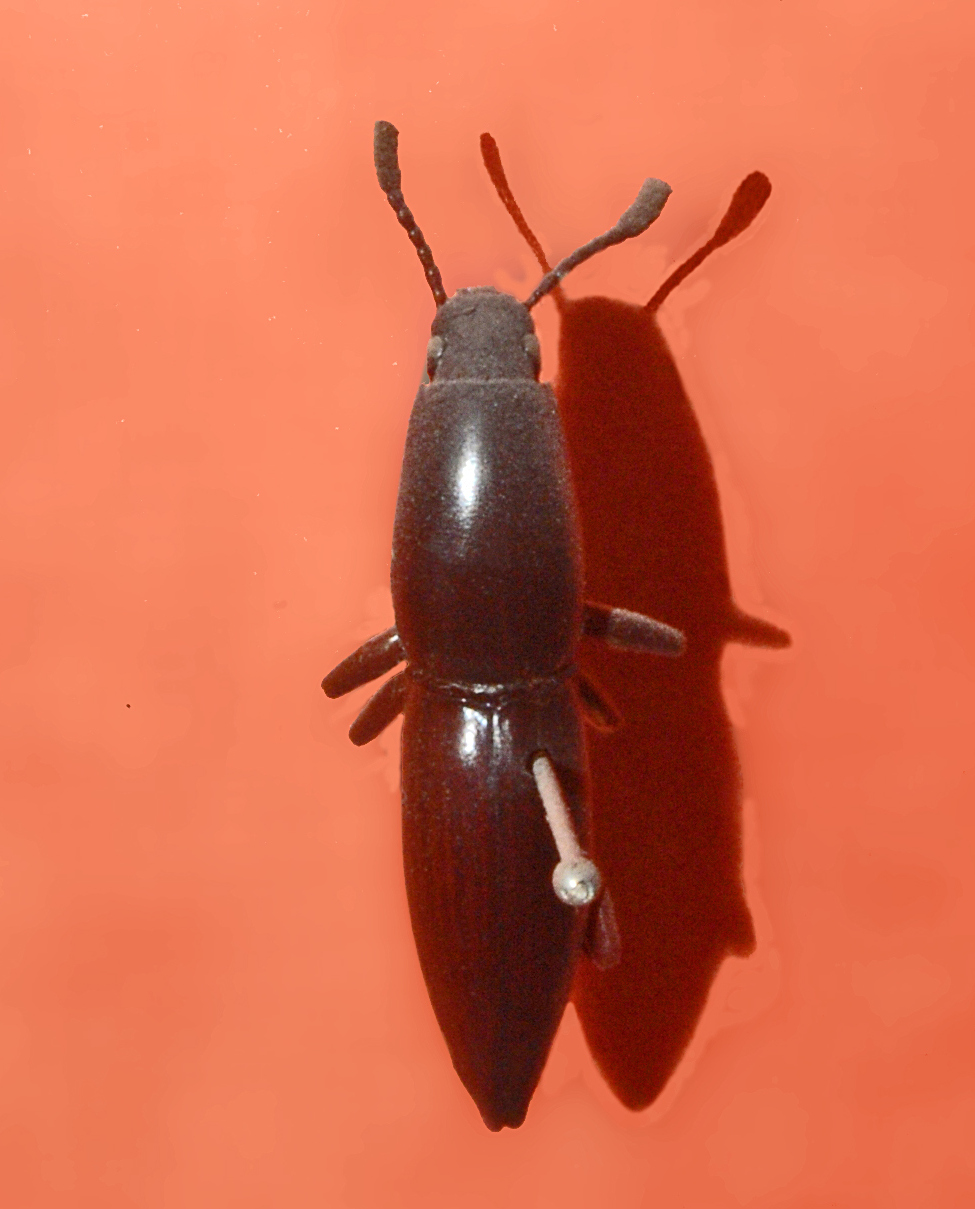
- Macellocerus acuminatus. Museum specimen

Scientific classification
- Kingdom: Animalia
- Phylum: Arthropoda
- Class: Insecta
- Order: Coleoptera
- Suborder: Polyphaga
- Infraorder: Cucujiformia
- Family: Tenebrionidae
- Genus: Macellocerus
- Species: M. acuminatus

Binomial name
- Macellocerus acuminatus Klug, 1833

= Macellocerus acuminatus =

Species of beetle

Macellocerus acuminatus is a species of darkling beetles in the subfamily Tenebrioninae.

== Distribution ==
This species is present in Madagascar.
