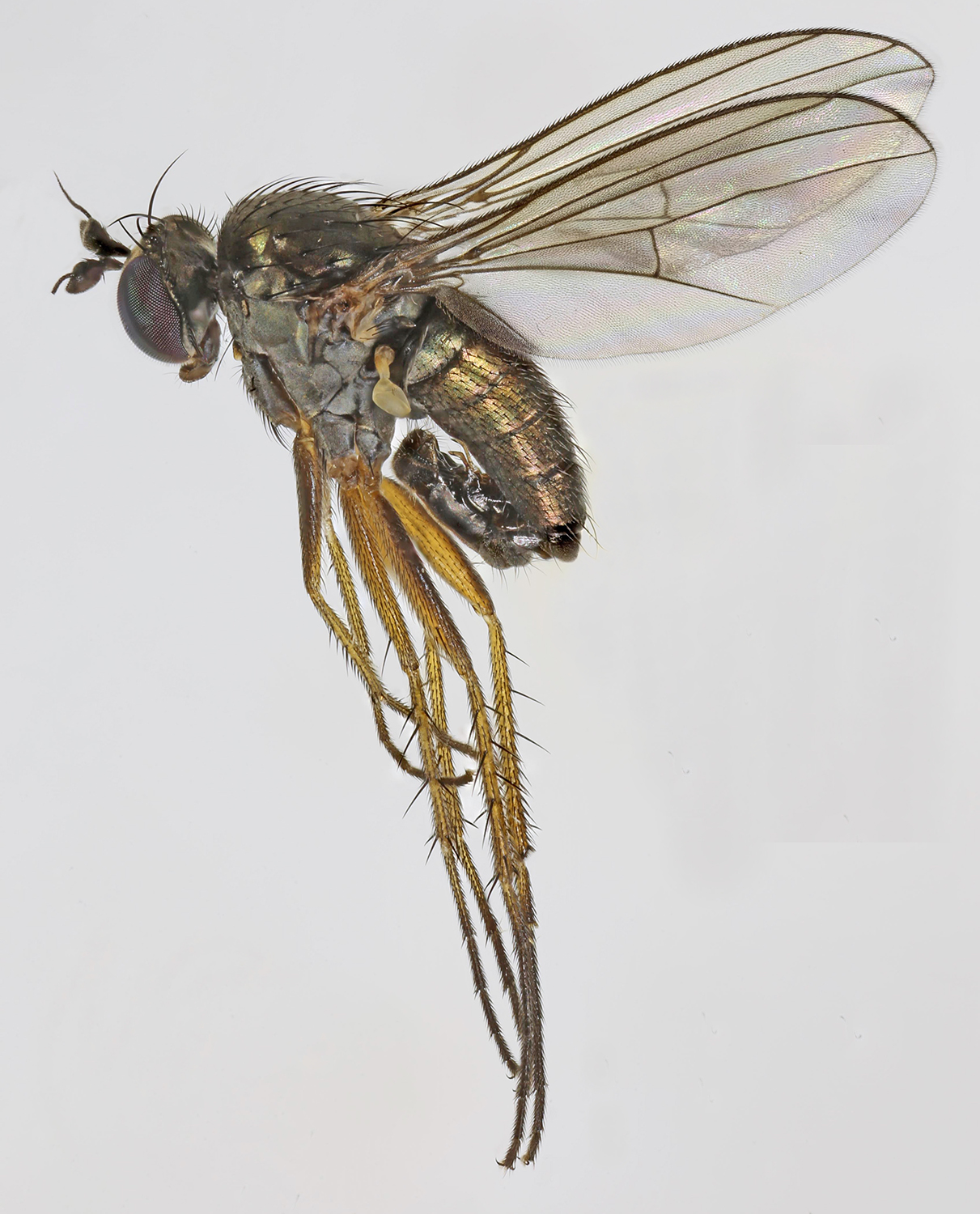
- Gymnopternus aerosus North Wales

Scientific classification
- Kingdom: Animalia
- Phylum: Arthropoda
- Clade: Pancrustacea
- Class: Insecta
- Order: Diptera
- Family: Dolichopodidae
- Genus: Gymnopternus
- Species: G. aerosus

Binomial name
- Gymnopternus aerosus (Fallen, 1823)

Synonyms
- Dolichopus aerosus Fallen, 1823; Dolichopus dahlbomi Zetterstedt, 1843; Dolichopus lineatipes Loew, 1857; Gymnopternus dahlbomi (Zetterstedt, 1843); Gymnopternus lineatipes (Loew, 1857); Hercostomus aerosus (Fallen, 1823); Hercostomus dahlbomi (Zetterstedt, 1843); Hercostomus lineatipes (Loew, 1857)

= Gymnopternus aerosus =

Species of fly

Gymnopternus aerosus is a species of fly in the family Dolichopodidae. It is found in the Palearctic.
