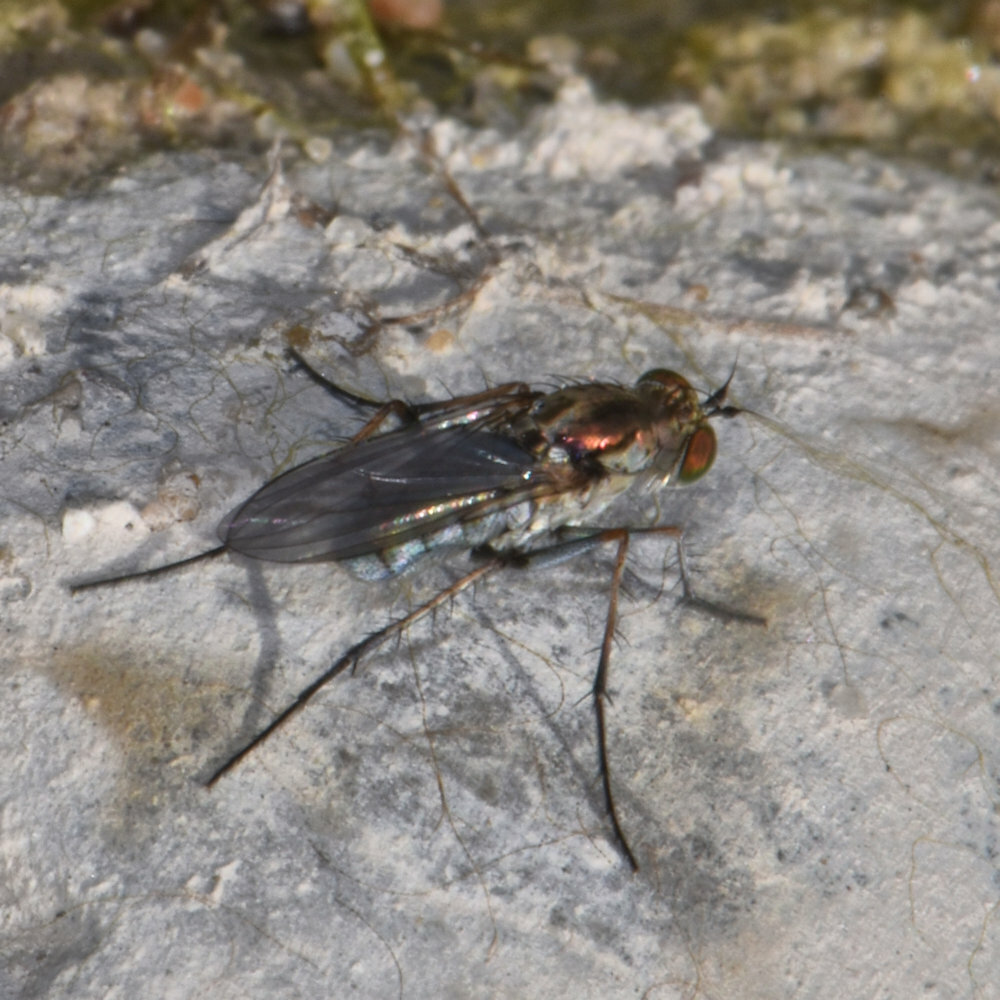
- Tachytrechus vorax, Canada

Scientific classification
- Kingdom: Animalia
- Phylum: Arthropoda
- Clade: Pancrustacea
- Class: Insecta
- Order: Diptera
- Family: Dolichopodidae
- Genus: Tachytrechus
- Species: T. vorax

Binomial name
- Tachytrechus vorax Loew, 1861

= Tachytrechus vorax =

Species of fly

Tachytrechus vorax is a species of long-legged fly in the family Dolichopodidae.
