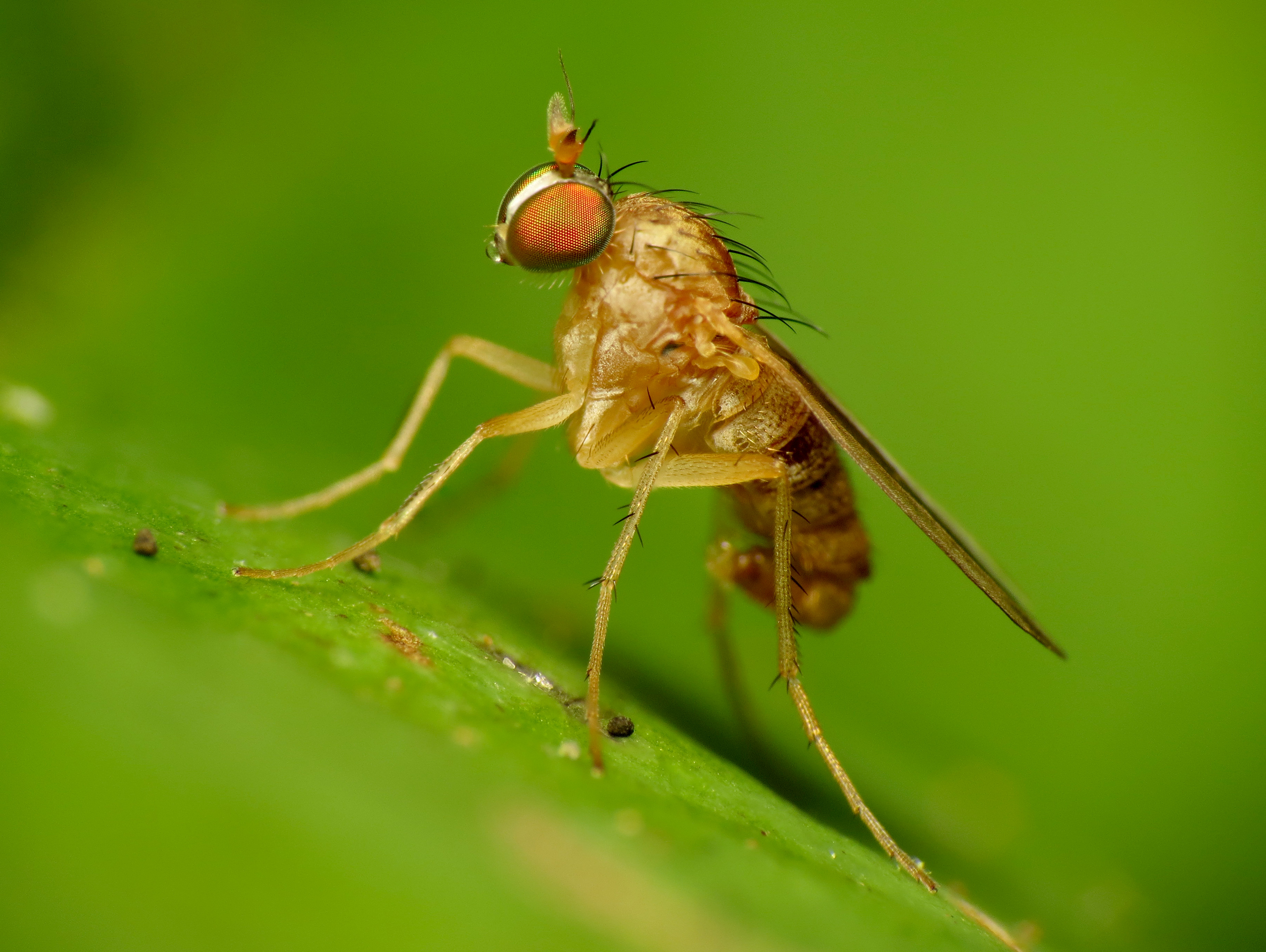

Scientific classification
- Kingdom: Animalia
- Phylum: Arthropoda
- Clade: Pancrustacea
- Class: Insecta
- Order: Diptera
- Family: Dolichopodidae
- Genus: Gymnopternus
- Species: G. flavus

Binomial name
- Gymnopternus flavus Loew, 1861

= Gymnopternus flavus =

Species of fly

Gymnopternus flavus is a species of long-legged fly in the family Dolichopodidae.
