= Tachytrechus auratus =

Scientific classification
- Kingdom: Animalia
- Phylum: Arthropoda
- Clade: Pancrustacea
- Class: Insecta
- Order: Diptera
- Family: Dolichopodidae
- Genus: Tachytrechus
- Species: T. auratus

Binomial name
- Tachytrechus auratus (Aldrich, 1896)

Synonyms
- Macellocerus auratus Aldrich, 1896

Species of fly

Tachytrechus auratus is a species of long-legged fly in the family Dolichopodidae. This species typically inhabits mud flats and freshet seeps in east-central Washington. Adults are active from late April to mid-September. Pupal development typically takes 4 to 7 days. The maximum adult lifespan is 7 days.
