= Gymnopternus pseudodebilis =

Scientific classification
- Kingdom: Animalia
- Phylum: Arthropoda
- Clade: Pancrustacea
- Class: Insecta
- Order: Diptera
- Family: Dolichopodidae
- Genus: Gymnopternus
- Species: G. pseudodebilis

Binomial name
- Gymnopternus pseudodebilis Robinson, 1964

Species of fly

Gymnopternus pseudodebilis is a species of long-legged fly in the family Dolichopodidae.
