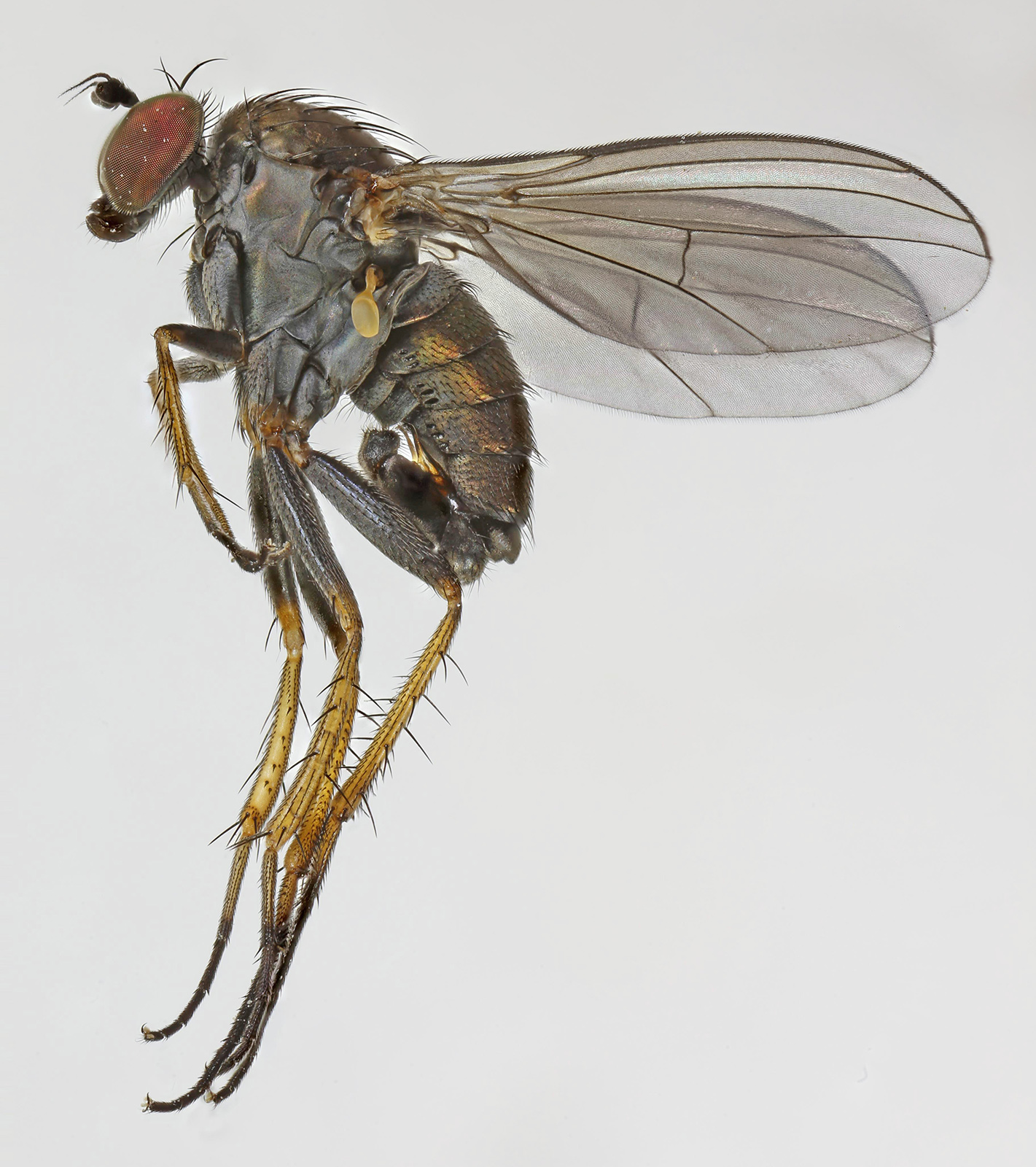
- Gymnopternus cupreus North Wales

Scientific classification
- Kingdom: Animalia
- Phylum: Arthropoda
- Clade: Pancrustacea
- Class: Insecta
- Order: Diptera
- Family: Dolichopodidae
- Genus: Gymnopternus
- Species: G. cupreus

Binomial name
- Gymnopternus cupreus (Fallen, 1823)

Synonyms
- Dolichopus albifrons Zetterstedt, 1859; Dolichopus cupreus Fallen, 1823; Gymnopternus albifrons (Zetterstedt, 1859); Hercostomus albifrons (Zetterstedt, 1859); Hercostomus cupreus (Fallen, 1823)

= Gymnopternus cupreus =

Species of fly

Gymnopternus cupreus is a species of fly in the family Dolichopodidae. It is found in the Palearctic.
