= Gymnopternus scotias =

Scientific classification
- Kingdom: Animalia
- Phylum: Arthropoda
- Clade: Pancrustacea
- Class: Insecta
- Order: Diptera
- Family: Dolichopodidae
- Genus: Gymnopternus
- Species: G. scotias

Binomial name
- Gymnopternus scotias Loew, 1861

Synonyms
- Hercostomus browni Van Duzee, 1933

Species of fly

Gymnopternus scotias is a species of long-legged fly in the family Dolichopodidae.
