= Tachytrechus angustipennis =

Scientific classification
- Kingdom: Animalia
- Phylum: Arthropoda
- Clade: Pancrustacea
- Class: Insecta
- Order: Diptera
- Family: Dolichopodidae
- Genus: Tachytrechus
- Species: T. angustipennis

Binomial name
- Tachytrechus angustipennis Loew, 1862

Species of fly

Tachytrechus angustipennis is a species of long-legged fly in the family Dolichopodidae. It is distributed across the United States, from California and Utah to Washington, D.C., south to Florida, and south to the Neotropical realm. It is also recorded from the Hawaiian Islands. Adults inhabit algal mats at Yellowstone National Park. The species is predatory, with their primary prey being Paracoenia eggs and larvae. Males are territorial.
