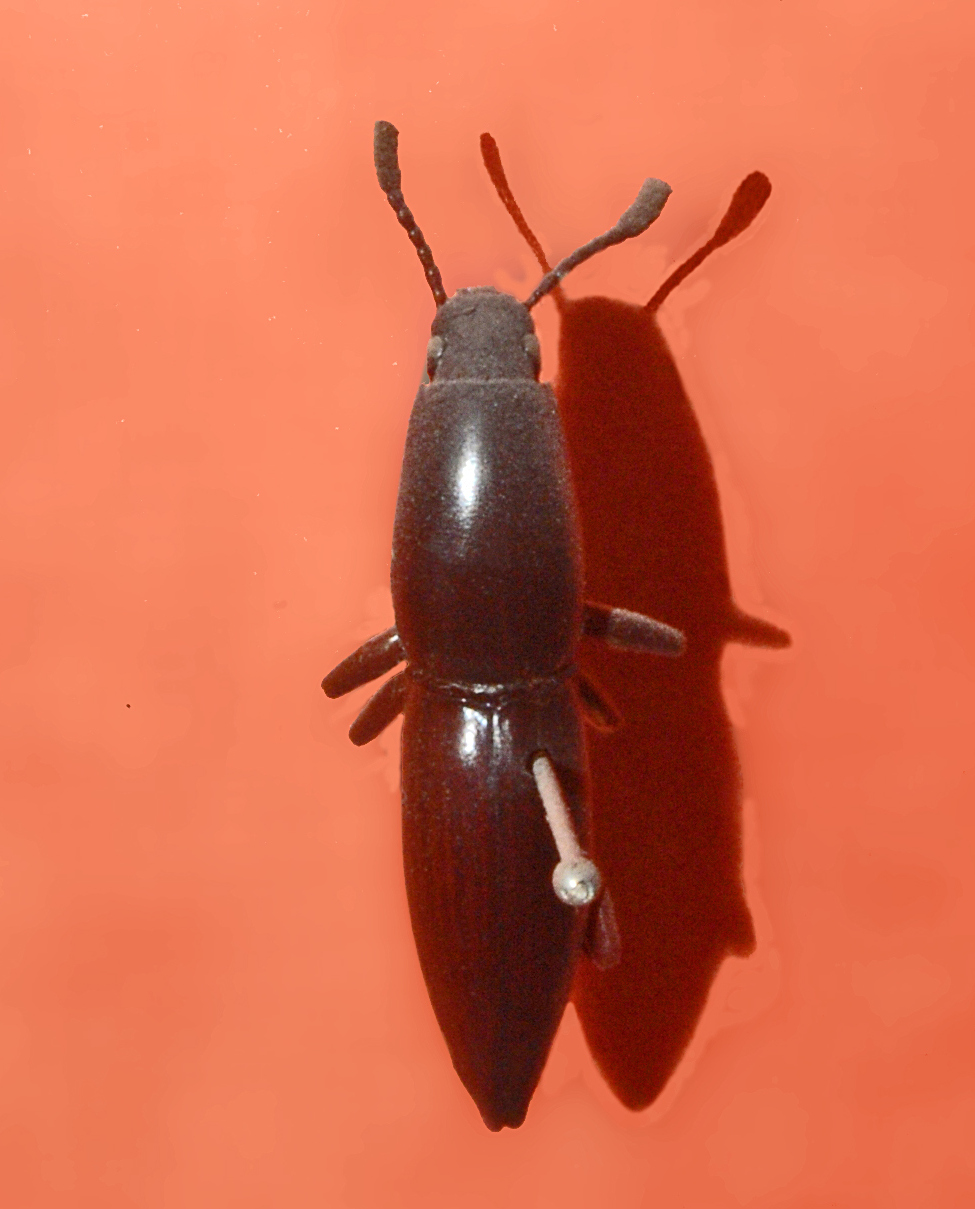
- Macellocerus acuminatus

Scientific classification
- Kingdom: Animalia
- Phylum: Arthropoda
- Class: Insecta
- Order: Coleoptera
- Suborder: Polyphaga
- Infraorder: Cucujiformia
- Family: Tenebrionidae
- Subfamily: Tenebrioninae
- Genus: Macellocerus; Solier in Baudi & Truqui, 1848

= Macellocerus =

Genus of beetles

Macellocerus is a genus of darkling beetles in the subfamily Tenebrioninae.

== Species ==
Species within this genus include:

- Macellocerus acuminatus
- Macellocerus acutipenis
- Macellocerus ambalamanakanae
- Macellocerus ambiguus
- Macellocerus approximatus
- Macellocerus atroaenescens
- Macellocerus batesi
- Macellocerus connexus
- Macellocerus dimidiatus
- Macellocerus distinctus
- Macellocerus gibbipennis
- Macellocerus heterocerus
- Macellocerus klugi
- Macellocerus laticornis
- Macellocerus longicornis
- Macellocerus lucifugus
- Macellocerus lucifugus
- Macellocerus mucronatus
- Macellocerus opaculus
- Macellocerus pectoralis
- Macellocerus politipennis
- Macellocerus pulchripes
- Macellocerus puncticeps
- Macellocerus ruguliceps
- Macellocerus solieri
- Macellocerus specolae
- Macellocerus striatus
- Macellocerus tibialis
- Macellocerus violanü
