= STC1 =

Glycoprotein, a homologue of a hormone stanniocalcin

Identifiers
- Aliases: STC1, STC, stanniocalcin 1
- External IDs: OMIM: 601185; MGI: 109131; GeneCards: STC1

Gene location (Human)
Chr.	Chromosome 8 (human)
Band	8p21.2	Start	23,841,929 bp
Band	8p21.2	End	23,854,806 bp

Gene location (Mouse)
Chr.	Chromosome 14 (mouse)
Band	14|14 D2	Start	69,266,687 bp
Band	14|14 D2	End	69,279,253 bp
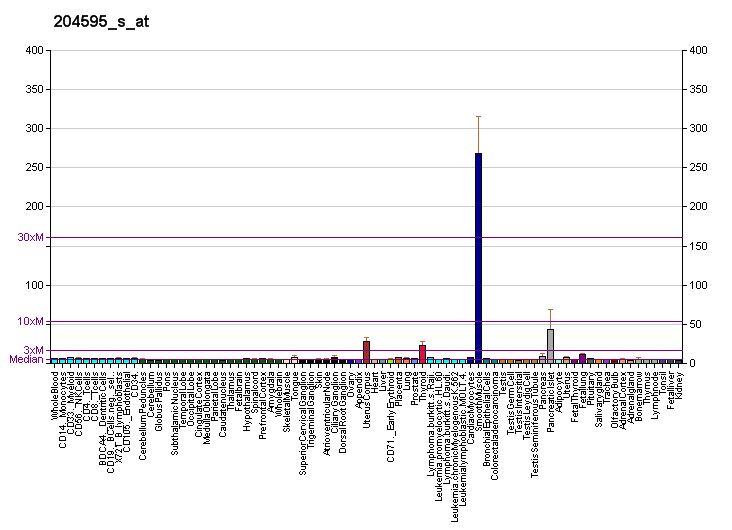

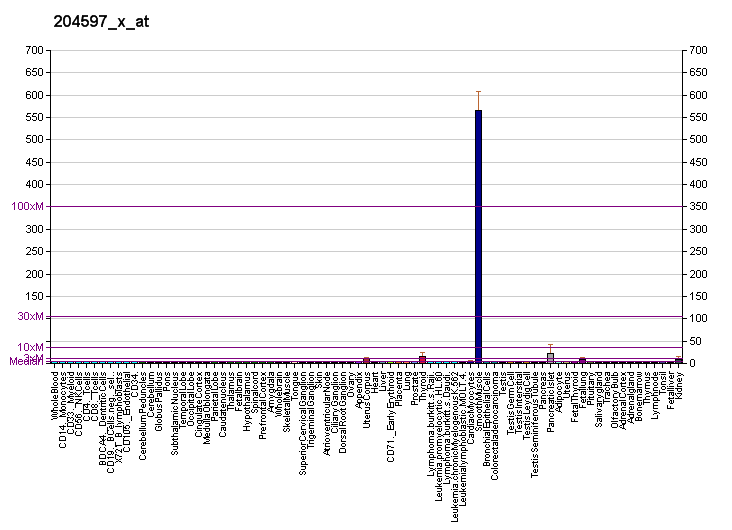

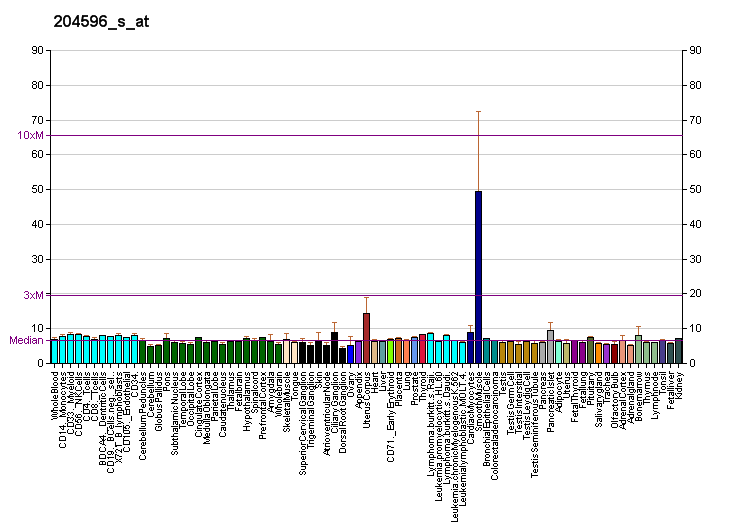
RNA expression pattern
Bgee	Human / Mouse (ortholog); Top expressed in: pericardium; vena cava; buccal mucosa cell; islet of Langerhans; cartilage tissue; stromal cell of endometrium; mucosa of urinary bladder; thyroid gland; left lobe of thyroid gland; Epithelium of choroid plexus / Top expressed in: posterior horn of spinal cord; adventitia of ureter; inner renal medulla; tongue; Rostral migratory stream; desmocranium; joints of the foot; medullary collecting duct; Stroma of ovary; Gonadal ridge; More reference expression data
BioGPS	More reference expression data
Gene ontology
Molecular function	hormone activity
Cellular component	cytoplasm; extracellular region; apical plasma membrane; nucleus; extracellular space
Biological process	response to vitamin D; response to organic cyclic compound; ossification; endothelial cell morphogenesis; cellular calcium ion homeostasis; negative regulation of endothelial cell migration; regulation of cardiac muscle cell contraction; growth plate cartilage axis specification; positive regulation of calcium ion import; cellular response to glucocorticoid stimulus; negative regulation of cell migration; decidualization; chondrocyte proliferation; negative regulation of calcium ion transport; negative regulation of renal phosphate excretion; bone development; regulation of anion transport; cellular response to hypoxia; embryo implantation; cellular response to cAMP; regulation of signaling receptor activity; signal transduction
Sources:Amigo / QuickGO
Orthologs
Databases	NCBI: entry; OMA: entry
Species	Human	Mouse
Entrez	6781	20855
Ensembl	ENSG00000159167	ENSMUSG00000014813
UniProt	P52823	O55183
RefSeq (mRNA)	NM_003155	NM_009285
RefSeq (protein)	NP_003146	NP_033311
Location (UCSC)	Chr 8: 23.84 – 23.85 Mb	Chr 14: 69.27 – 69.28 Mb
PubMed search
- Wikidata
View/Edit Human	View/Edit Mouse

Stanniocalcin-1 is a glycoprotein, a homologue of a hormone stanniocalcin, first discovered in bony fishes. In humans it is encoded by the STC1 gene.

== Function ==
This gene encodes a secreted, homodimeric glycoprotein that is expressed in a wide variety of tissues and may have autocrine or paracrine functions. The only known molecular function of human Stanniocalcin-1 to date is a SUMO E3 ubiquitin ligase activity in the SUMOylation cycle. However, STC1 interacts with many proteins in the cytoplasm, mitochondria, endoplasmatic reticulum, and in dot-like fashion in the cell nucleus. The N-terminal region of STC1 is the function region which is responsible to establish the interaction with its partners, including SUMO1. Low-resolution studies shows that STC1 is an anti-parallel homodimer in solution and the cysteine 202 is responsible for its dimerization. All the 5 disulfide bonds of human STC1 are conserved and have the same profile of fish STC. The gene contains a 5' UTR rich in CAG trinucleotide repeats. The encoded protein contains 11 conserved cysteine residues and is phosphorylated by protein kinase C exclusively on its serine residues.

The protein may play a role in the regulation of renal and intestinal calcium and phosphate transport, cell metabolism, or cellular calcium/phosphate homeostasis. Overexpression of human stanniocalcin 1 in mice produces high serum phosphate levels, dwarfism, and increased metabolic rate. This gene has altered expression in hepatocellular, ovarian, and breast cancers, and is a putative molecular biomarker of leukemic microenvironment.
