= Hermann Friedrich Stannius =

German anatomist, physiologist and entomologist

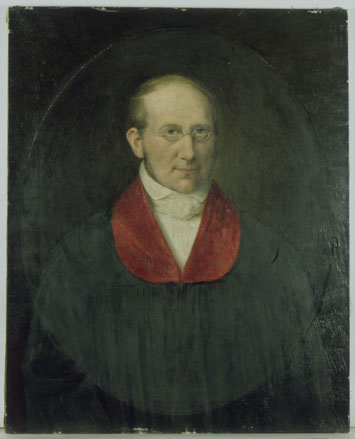
Hermann Friedrich Stannius.

Hermann Friedrich Stannius (15 March 1808, Hamburg – 15 January 1883, Sachsenberg near Schwerin) was a German anatomist, physiologist and entomologist. He specialised in the insect order Diptera especially the family Dolichopodidae.

== Works ==
Entomology

- De speciebus nonnullis Mycethophila vel novis vel minus cognitis.Bratislava, 1831.
- Die europischen Arten der Zweyfluglergattung Dolichopus. Isis Oken 1831: 28–68, 122–144, 248–271, 1831.
- Beiträge zur Entomologie, besondere in Bezug auf Schlesien, gemeinschaftlich mit Schummel. Breslau, 1832.
- Über den Einfluss der Nerven auf den Blutumlauf. [Froriep's] Notizen aus dem Gebiete der Natur- und Heilkunde, 1833, 36: 246–248.
- Ueber einige Missbildungen an Insekten. [Müller's] Archiv für Anatomie, Physiologie und wissenschaftliche Medizin, Berlin, 1835: 295–310.

Medical and Physiology

- Allgemeine Pathologie. Berlin, I, 1837.
- Ueber die Einwirkung des Strychnins auf das Nervensystem. Archiv für Anatomie, Physiologie und wissenschaftliche Medizin, Berlin, 1837: 223–236.
- Ueber Nebennieren bei Knorpelfischen. Archiv für Anatomie, Physiologie und wissenschaftliche Medizin, Berlin, 1839: 97-101.
- Ueber krankhafte Verschliessung grösserer Venenstämme. Berlin, 1839.
- Ueber Lymphhezen der Vögel. Archiv für Anatomie, Physiologie und wissenschaftliche Medizin, Berlin, 1843: 449–452.
- Ueber den Bau des Delphingehirns. Rostock, 1845.
- Abhandlungen aus dem Gebiet der Naturwissenschaften, Hamburg, 1846, I: 1-16.
- Bemerkungen über das Verhältniss der Ganoiden zu den Clupeiden.Rostock, 1846.
- Beiträge zur Kenntniss der amerikanischen Manati’s. Rostock, 1846.
- Lehrbuch der vergleichenden Anatomie der Wirbeltiere.2 volumes, Berlin, Veit & Co.,1846-1848. 2nd edition, 1852.

Carl Theodor Ernst von Siebold (1804-1885) wrote the first volume, Stannius the second.

- Untersuchungen ueber Muskelreizbarkeit. Archiv für Anatomie, Physiologie und wissenschaftliche Medizin, Berlin, 1847: 443–462. Also 1849: 588–592.
- Versuch über die Function der Zungennerven.Archiv für Anatomie, Physiologie und wissenschaftliche Medizin, Berlin, 1848.
- Beiträge zur Geschichte des Enchondroms.Archiv für Anatomie, Physiologie und wissenschaftliche Medizin, Berlin, 1848.
- Das peripherische Nervensystem der Fische, anatomisch und physiologisch untersucht. Rostock, 1849.
- Ueber eine der Thymus entsprechende Drüse bei Knochenfischen.Archiv für Anatomie, Physiologie und wissenschaftliche Medizin, Berlin, 1850.
- Ueber Theilung der Primitivröhren in den Stämmen, Aesten und Zweigen der Nerven.Archiv für physiologische Heilkunde, Stuttgart, 1850; IX.
- Versuche über die Ausscheidung der Nieren. Archiv für physiologische Heilkunde, Stuttgart, 1850; IX.
- Ueber die Wirkung der Digitalis und des Digitalin.

Archiv für physiologische Heilkunde, Stuttgart, 1851, 10: 177–209.

- Zwei Reihen physiologischer Versuche. Archiv für Anatomie, Physiologie und wissenschaftliche Medizin, Berlin, 1852: 85-100. Partial translation in John Farquhar Fulton's (1899-1960) Selected Readings in the History of Physiology, 2nd. Edition, 1966: 59–60.
- Untersuchungen über Leistungsfähigkeit der Muskeln und Todesstarre. Archiv für physiologische Heilkunde, Stuttgart, 1852; XI.
- Beobachtungen über Verjüngungsvorgänge im thierischen Organismus. Rostock, 1853.
