= Xenochaetina flavipennis =

Scientific classification
- Kingdom: Animalia
- Phylum: Arthropoda
- Class: Insecta
- Order: Diptera
- Family: Lauxaniidae
- Genus: Xenochaetina
- Species: X. flavipennis

Binomial name
- Xenochaetina flavipennis (Fabricius, 1805)

Synonyms
- Lauxania muscaria Loew, 1861; Lauxania ruficornis Macquart, 1851

Species of fly

Xenochaetina flavipennis is a species of fly in the family Lauxaniidae.
