= Trisapromyza vittigera =

Scientific classification
- Domain: Eukaryota
- Kingdom: Animalia
- Phylum: Arthropoda
- Class: Insecta
- Order: Diptera
- Family: Lauxaniidae
- Genus: Trisapromyza
- Species: T. vittigera

Binomial name
- Trisapromyza vittigera (Coquillett, 1902)

Synonyms
- Sapromyza vittigera Coquillett, 1902

Species of fly

Trisapromyza vittigera is a species of fly in the family Lauxaniidae.
