= Xenopterella obliqua =

Scientific classification
- Kingdom: Animalia
- Phylum: Arthropoda
- Class: Insecta
- Order: Diptera
- Family: Lauxaniidae
- Genus: Xenopterella
- Species: X. obliqua

Binomial name
- Xenopterella obliqua Malloch, 1926

Species of fly

Xenopterella obliqua is a species of fly in the family Lauxaniidae.
