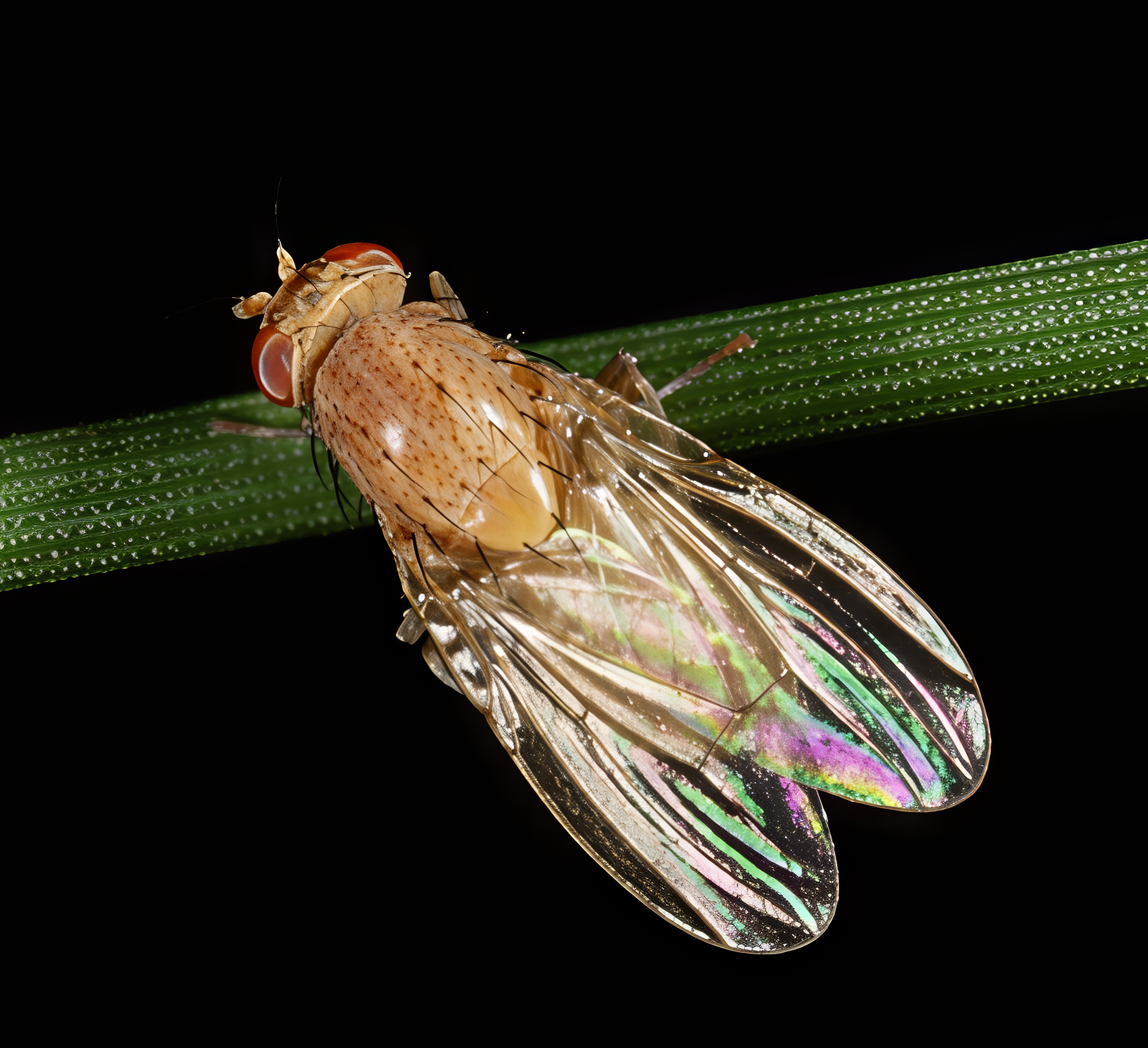
- Tricholauxania praeusta dorsal view
- Tricholauxania praeusta lateral view.jpg

Scientific classification
- Kingdom: Animalia
- Phylum: Arthropoda
- Class: Insecta
- Order: Diptera
- Family: Lauxaniidae
- Genus: Tricholauxania
- Species: T. praeusta

Binomial name
- Tricholauxania praeusta (Fallén, 1820)

= Tricholauxania praeusta =

Species of fly

Tricholauxania praeusta is a species of fly in the family Lauxaniidae. It is found in the Palearctic. The larvae are saprophagous.
