= Xenopterella beameri =

Scientific classification
- Kingdom: Animalia
- Phylum: Arthropoda
- Class: Insecta
- Order: Diptera
- Family: Lauxaniidae
- Genus: Xenopterella
- Species: X. beameri

Binomial name
- Xenopterella beameri Steyskal, 1965

Species of fly

Xenopterella beameri is a species of fly in the family Lauxaniidae.
