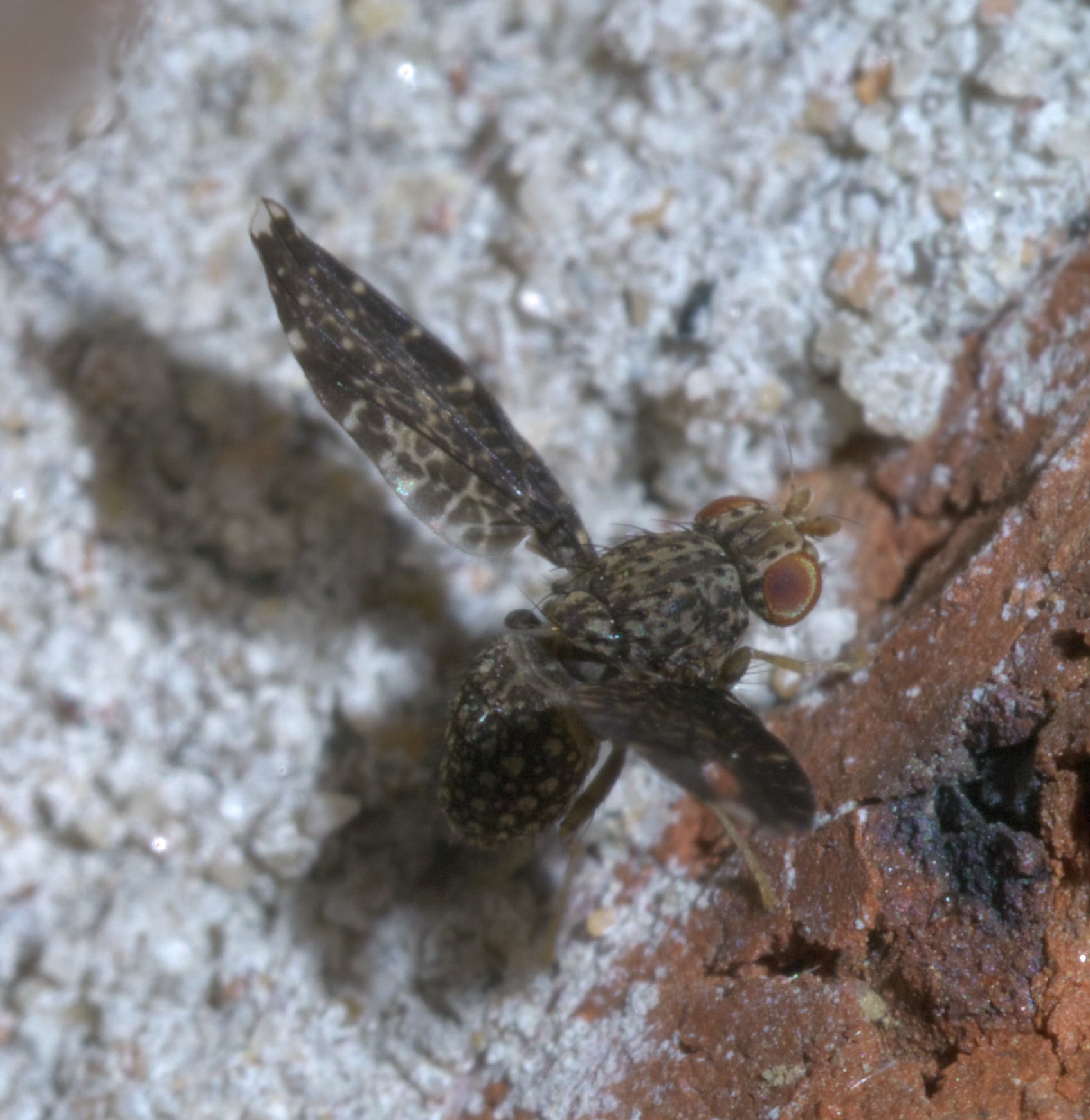

Scientific classification
- Domain: Eukaryota
- Kingdom: Animalia
- Phylum: Arthropoda
- Class: Insecta
- Order: Diptera
- Family: Lauxaniidae
- Genus: Trypetisoma
- Species: T. sticticum

Binomial name
- Trypetisoma sticticum (Loew, 1863)

Synonyms
- Sapromyza stictica Loew, 1863

= Trypetisoma sticticum =

Species of fly

Trypetisoma sticticum is a species of fly in the family Lauxaniidae.

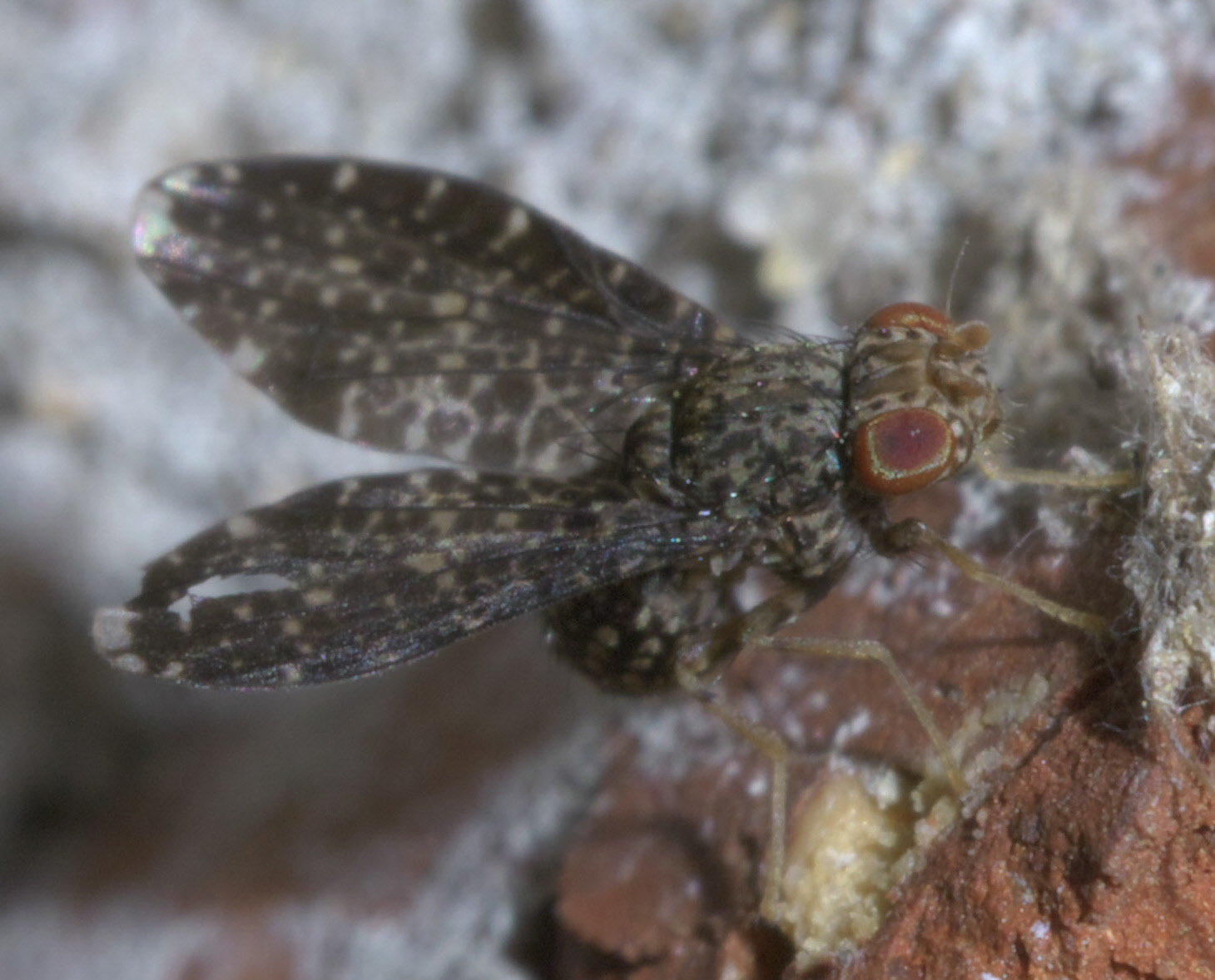
