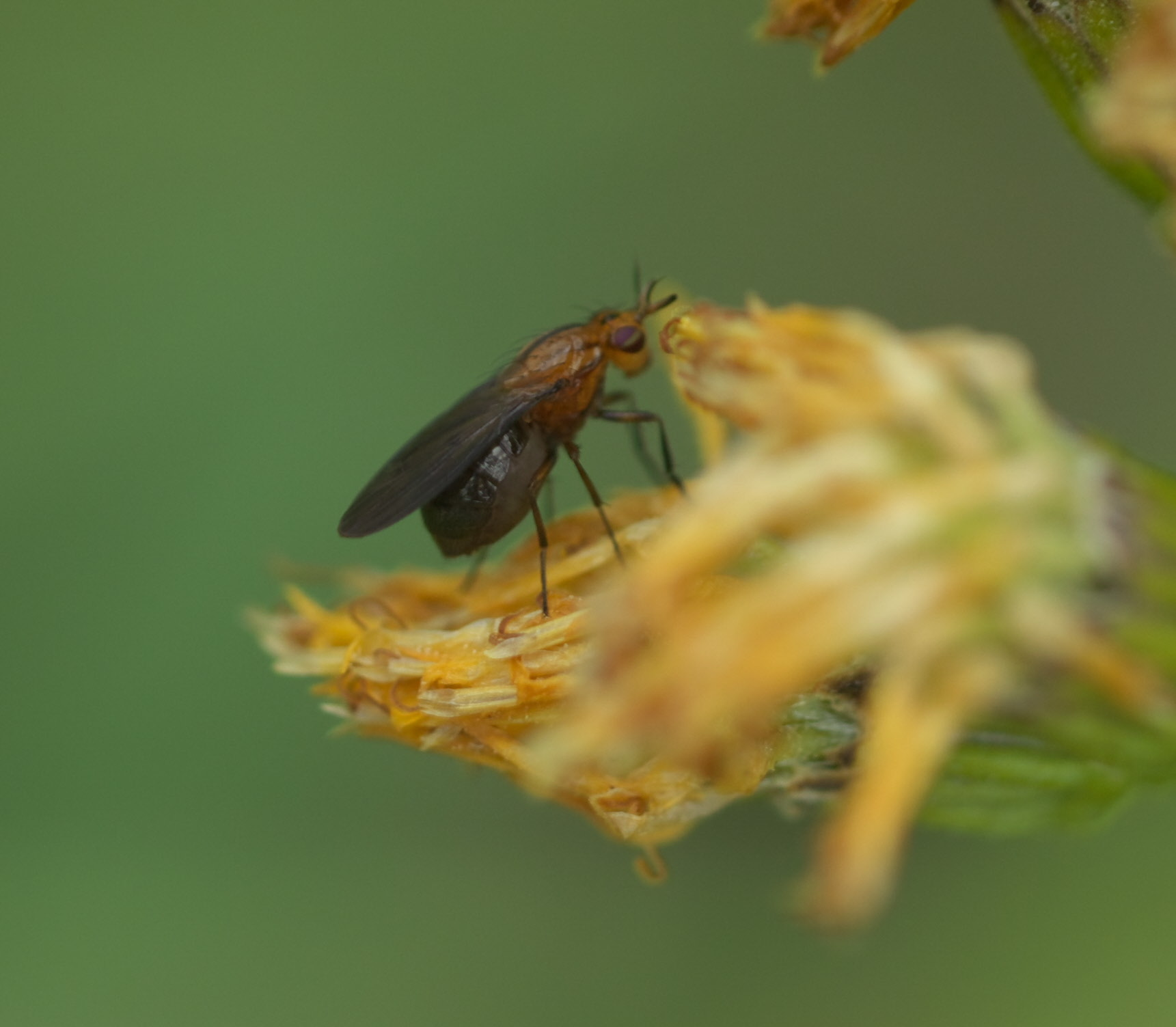

Scientific classification
- Kingdom: Animalia
- Phylum: Arthropoda
- Class: Insecta
- Order: Diptera
- Family: Lauxaniidae
- Genus: Camptoprosopella
- Species: C. dolorosa

Binomial name
- Camptoprosopella dolorosa (Williston, 1903)

Synonyms
- Pachycerina dolorosa Williston, 1903; Camptoprosopella melanoptera Hendel, 1907

= Camptoprosopella dolorosa =

Species of fly

Camptoprosopella dolorosa is a species of fly in the family Lauxaniidae.
