= Poecilominettia valida =

Scientific classification
- Kingdom: Animalia
- Phylum: Arthropoda
- Class: Insecta
- Order: Diptera
- Family: Lauxaniidae
- Genus: Poecilominettia
- Species: P. valida

Binomial name
- Poecilominettia valida (Walker, 1858)

Synonyms
- Drosophila valida Walker, 1858

Species of fly

Poecilominettia valida is a species of fly in the family Lauxaniidae.
