= Poecilominettia ordinaria =

Scientific classification
- Domain: Eukaryota
- Kingdom: Animalia
- Phylum: Arthropoda
- Class: Insecta
- Order: Diptera
- Family: Lauxaniidae
- Genus: Poecilominettia
- Species: P. ordinaria

Binomial name
- Poecilominettia ordinaria (Melander, 1913)

Synonyms
- Minettia ordinaria Melander, 1913

Species of fly

Poecilominettia ordinaria is a species of fly in the family Lauxaniidae.
