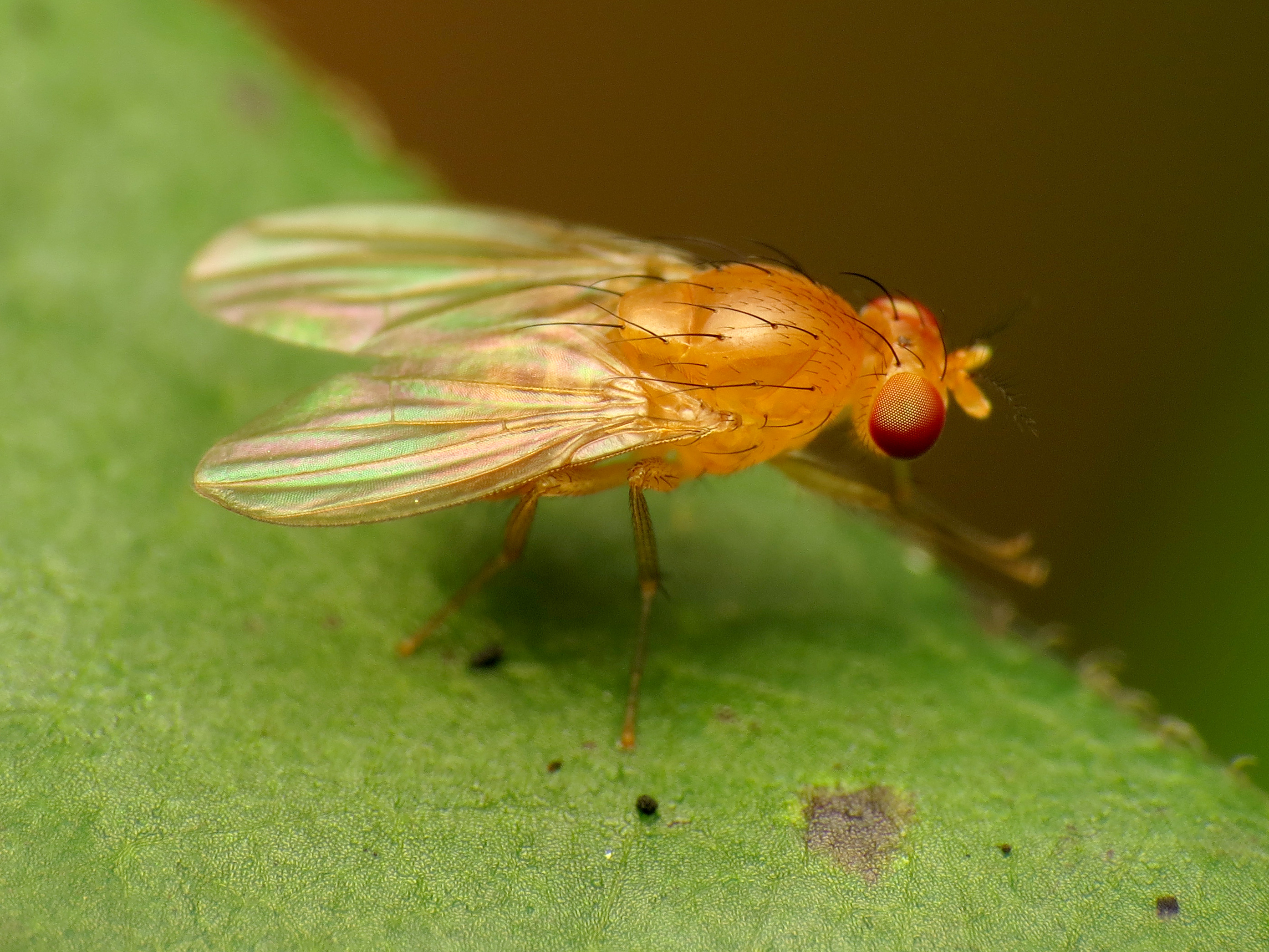

Scientific classification
- Domain: Eukaryota
- Kingdom: Animalia
- Phylum: Arthropoda
- Class: Insecta
- Order: Diptera
- Family: Lauxaniidae
- Subfamily: Lauxaniinae
- Genus: Neogriphoneura
- Species: N. sordida

Binomial name
- Neogriphoneura sordida (Wiedemann, 1830)

Synonyms
- Lauxania planiscuta Thomson, 1869; Sapromyza amida Walker, 1849; Sapromyza sordida Wiedemann, 1830

= Neogriphoneura sordida =

Species of fly

Neogriphoneura sordida is a species of fly in the family Lauxaniidae.

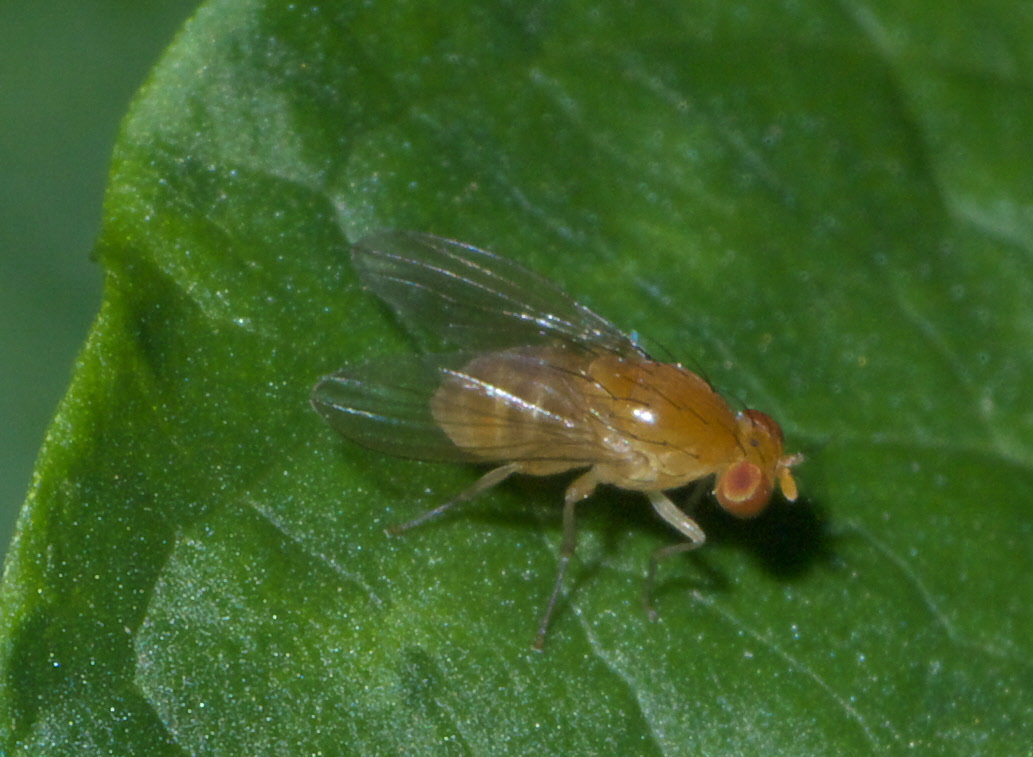
