= Poecilominettia puncticeps =

Scientific classification
- Domain: Eukaryota
- Kingdom: Animalia
- Phylum: Arthropoda
- Class: Insecta
- Order: Diptera
- Family: Lauxaniidae
- Genus: Poecilominettia
- Species: P. puncticeps

Binomial name
- Poecilominettia puncticeps (Coquillett, 1902)

Synonyms
- Sapromyza puncticeps Coquillett, 1902

Species of fly

Poecilominettia puncticeps is a species of fly in the family Lauxaniidae.
