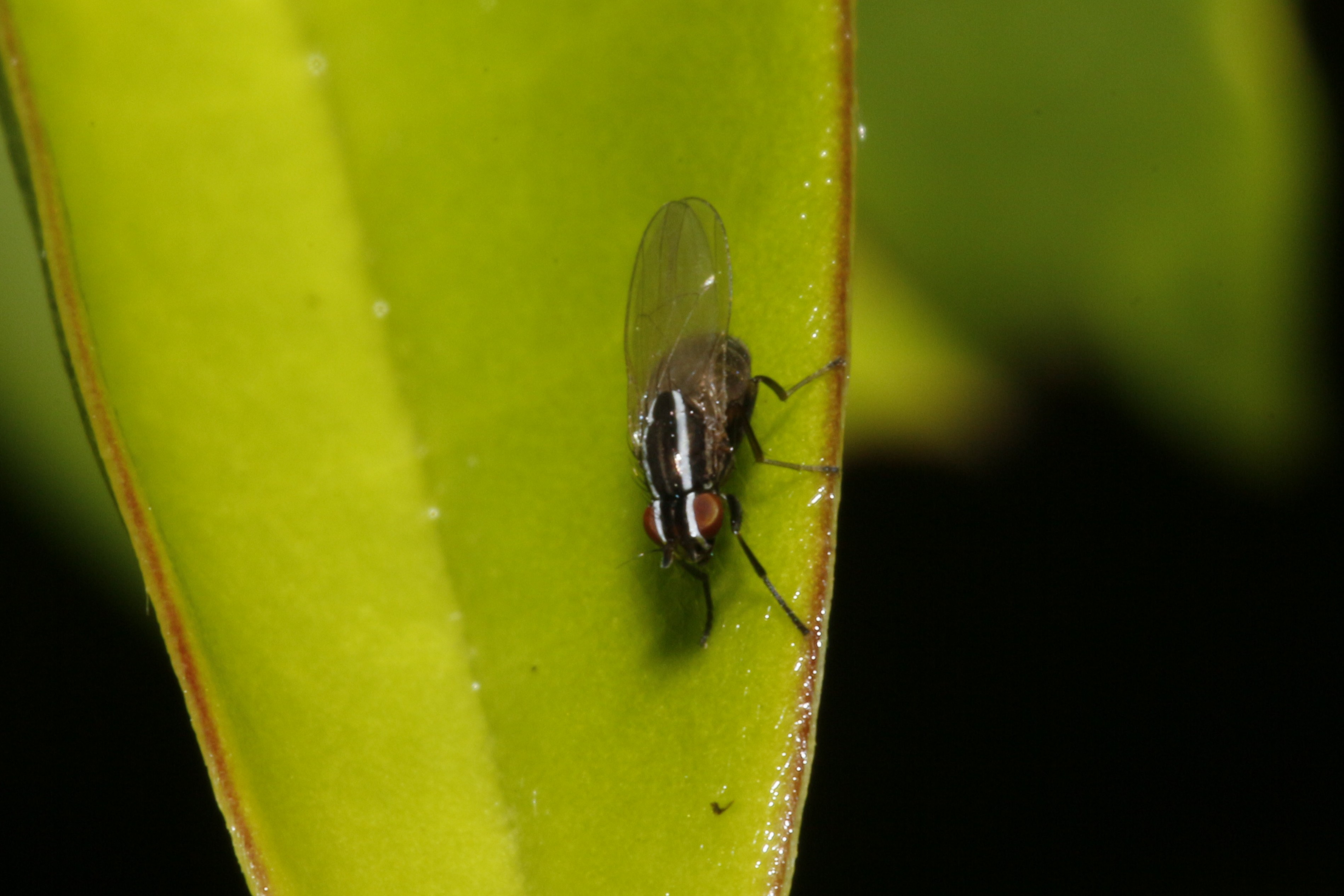

Scientific classification
- Kingdom: Animalia
- Phylum: Arthropoda
- Clade: Pancrustacea
- Class: Insecta
- Order: Diptera
- Family: Lauxaniidae
- Genus: Poecilohetaerus
- Species: P. aquilus

Binomial name
- Poecilohetaerus aquilus Schneider, 1991
- Known range

= Poecilohetaerus aquilus =

Species of fly

Poecilohetaerus aquilus is a species of lauxaniid fly. It is found in south-eastern and south-western Australia.

== Description ==
The head and antennae of P. aquilus are dark brown. The mesofacial region is almost flat, brown laterally and yellow medially. Two white bands are present, extending from the occiput around to the posterolateral margin of the eye. Mesonotum dark brown to black, with a pair of white bands reaching from the humeral callus to the end of the scutellum. Leg segments are of varying brown colour. Halteres variable in colour, usually yellowish. Tergites are dark brown and shining, while sternites are a more variable, lighter brown.

Males of P. aquilus are about 2.9–3.8 mm (0.11–0.15 in) in length, while females tend to be 3–3.8 mm (0.12–0.15 in).

== Etymology ==
The species epithet refers to the Latin adjective aquilus (dark-coloured, blackish), describing its dark-coloured overall body.
