= Camptoprosopella maculipennis =

Scientific classification
- Domain: Eukaryota
- Kingdom: Animalia
- Phylum: Arthropoda
- Class: Insecta
- Order: Diptera
- Family: Lauxaniidae
- Genus: Camptoprosopella
- Species: C. maculipennis

Binomial name
- Camptoprosopella maculipennis Malloch, 1923

Species of fly

Camptoprosopella maculipennis is a species of fly in the family Lauxaniidae.
