= Poecilohetaerus =

Scientific classification
- Kingdom: Animalia
- Phylum: Arthropoda
- Clade: Pancrustacea
- Class: Insecta
- Order: Diptera
- Family: Lauxaniidae
- Genus: Poecilohetaerus; Hendel, 1907

Synonyms
- Poecilohaeterus Hendel, 1907

Genus of insects

Poecilohetaerus is a genus of lauxaniid fly.

These 15 species are assigned to the genus:

- Poecilohetaerus albolineatus (Hendel, 1910)
- Poecilohetaerus aquilus Schneider, 1991
- Poecilohetaerus balius Schneider, 1991
- Poecilohetaerus castaneus Schneider, 1991
- Poecilohetaerus convergens Schneider, 1991
- Poecilohetaerus incomptus Schneider, 1991
- Poecilohetaerus leucopus Schneider, 1991
- Poecilohetaerus nigrifrons Schneider, 1991
- Poecilohetaerus pinnatus Schneider, 1991
- Poecilohetaerus punctatifacies Tonnoir & Malloch, 1926
- Poecilohetaerus ravus (Schneider & McAlpine, 1979)
- Poecilohetaerus schineri Hendel, 1907
- Poecilohetaerus suavis (Loew, 1847)
- Poecilohetaerus trivittatus (Schneider & McAlpine, 1979)
- Poecilohetaerus xanthopus Schneider, 1991
