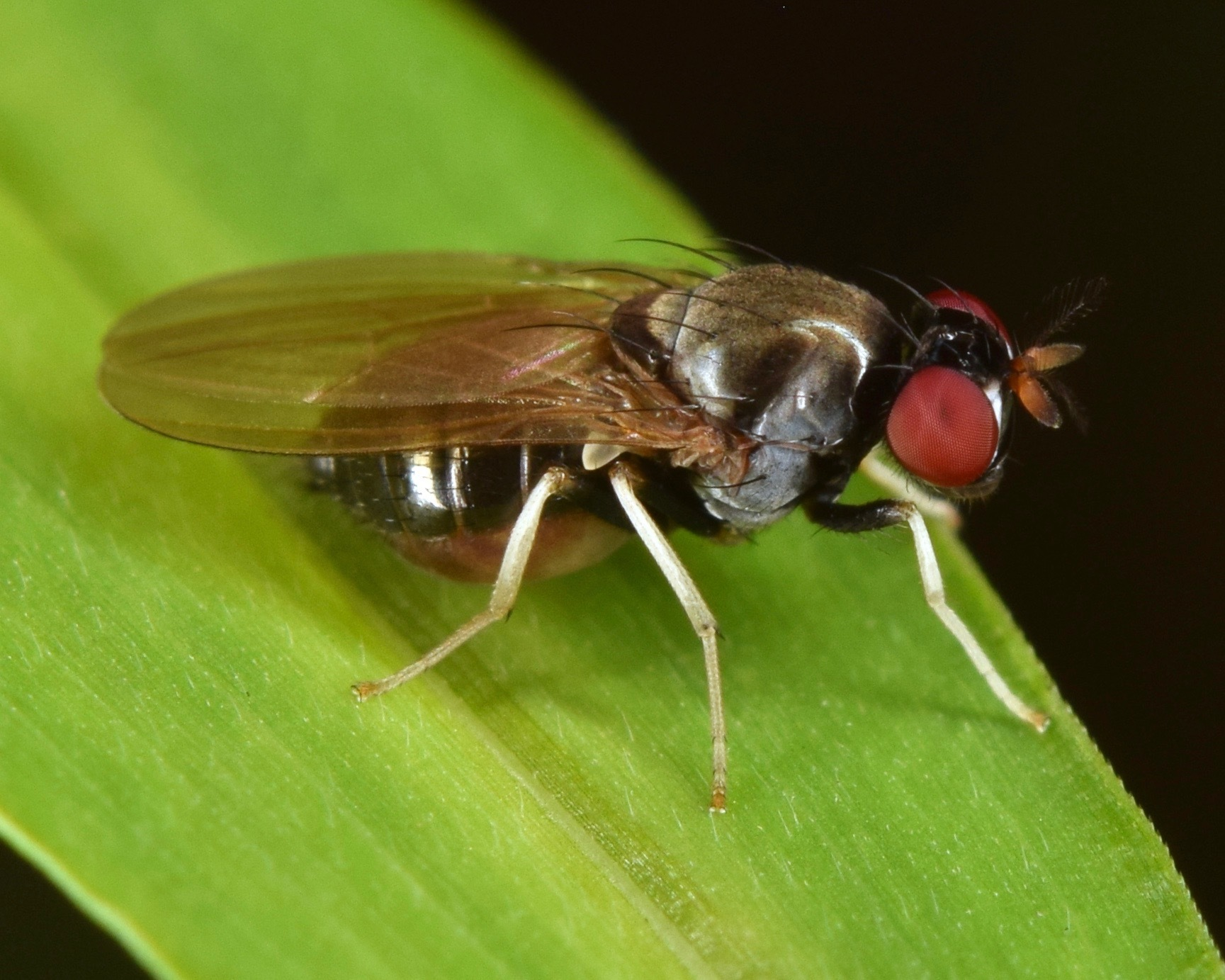

Scientific classification
- Domain: Eukaryota
- Kingdom: Animalia
- Phylum: Arthropoda
- Class: Insecta
- Order: Diptera
- Family: Lauxaniidae
- Genus: Melanomyza
- Species: M. femoralis

Binomial name
- Melanomyza femoralis (Loew, 1861)

Synonyms
- Lauxania femoralis Loew, 1861

= Melanomyza femoralis =

Species of fly

Melanomyza femoralis is a species of fly in the family Lauxaniidae.
