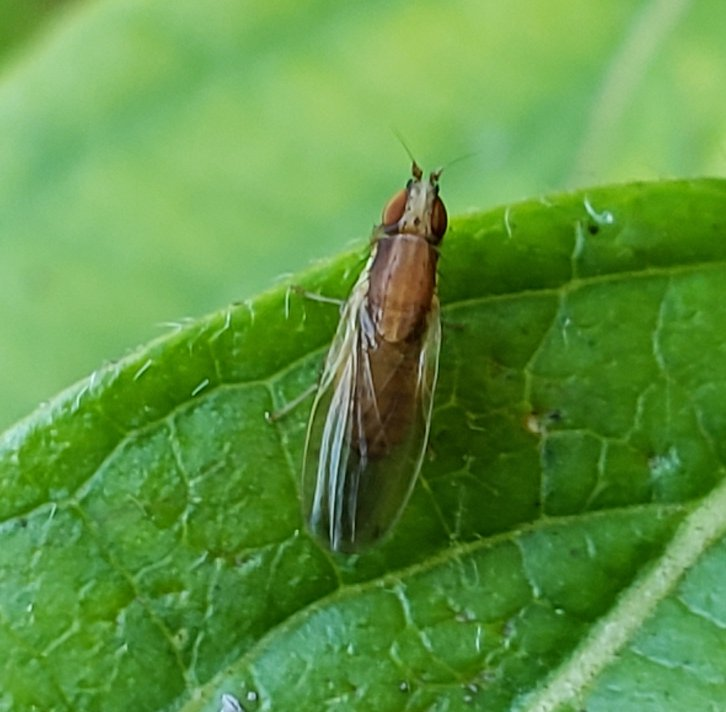

Scientific classification
- Domain: Eukaryota
- Kingdom: Animalia
- Phylum: Arthropoda
- Class: Insecta
- Order: Diptera
- Family: Lauxaniidae
- Genus: Trigonometopus
- Species: T. vittatus

Binomial name
- Trigonometopus vittatus Loew, 1869

= Trigonometopus vittatus =

Species of fly

Trigonometopus vittatus is a species of fly in the family Lauxaniidae.
