= Trigonometopus =

Scientific classification
- Domain: Eukaryota
- Kingdom: Animalia
- Phylum: Arthropoda
- Class: Insecta
- Order: Diptera
- Family: Lauxaniidae
- Genus: Trigonometopus; Macquart, 1835

Genus of flies

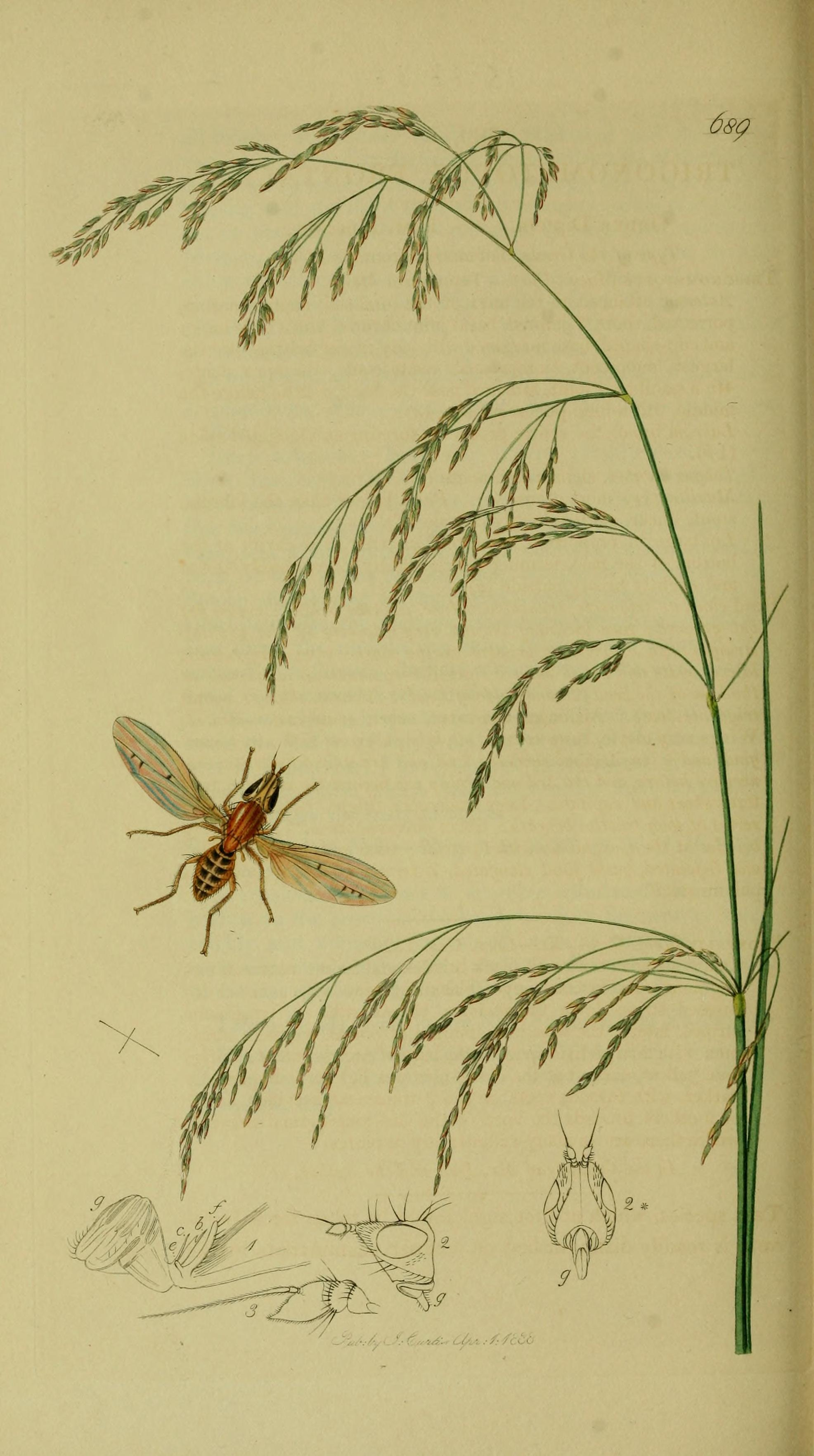
Trigonometopus frontalis

Trigonometopus is a genus of flies in the family Lauxaniidae. There are more than 20 described species in Trigonometopus.

== Species ==
These 25 species belong to the genus Trigonometopus:

- Trigonometopus abnormis Shatalkin, 1999
- Trigonometopus albifrons Knab, 1914
- Trigonometopus albiseta Bezzi, 1913
- Trigonometopus alboapicalis Shatalkin, 1997
- Trigonometopus albocostatus Hendel, 1912
- Trigonometopus angustipennis Knab, 1914
- Trigonometopus brevicornis Meijere, 1911
- Trigonometopus brunneicosta Malloch, 1927
- Trigonometopus canus Meijere, 1916
- Trigonometopus cuneatus Shatalkin, 1997
- Trigonometopus deceptor (Malloch, 1927)
- Trigonometopus eborifacies Shatalkin, 1997
- Trigonometopus forficula Shatalkin, 1997
- Trigonometopus fuscipennis Hendel, 1912
- Trigonometopus gressitti Sasakawa, 2002
- Trigonometopus immaculipennis Malloch, 1923
- Trigonometopus japonicus Sasakawa, 2002
- Trigonometopus nigripalpis Shatalkin, 1997
- Trigonometopus punctipennis Coquillett, 1898
- Trigonometopus rotundicornis Williston, 1896
- Trigonometopus semibrunneus Malloch, 1929
- Trigonometopus submaculipennis Malloch, 1927
- Trigonometopus tinctipennis Meijere, 1924
- Trigonometopus vittatus Loew, 1869
- Trigonometopus zeylanicus Senior-White, 1921
