= Physegeniopsis =

Scientific classification
- Kingdom: Animalia
- Phylum: Arthropoda
- Class: Insecta
- Order: Diptera
- Family: Lauxaniidae
- Subfamily: Eurychoromyiinae
- Genus: Physegeniopsis; Gaimari, 2010

Type species
- Physegeniopsis ankhoidea Gaimari, 2010

Genus of flies

Physegeniopsis is a genus of flies in the family Lauxaniidae.

== Species ==
- Physegeniopsis albeto Gaimari, 2010
- Physegeniopsis ankhoidea Gaimari, 2010
- Physegeniopsis hadrocara Gaimari, 2010
