= Baliopteridion =

Scientific classification
- Kingdom: Animalia
- Phylum: Arthropoda
- Class: Insecta
- Order: Diptera
- Family: Lauxaniidae
- Subfamily: Lauxaniinae
- Genus: Baliopteridion; Papp & Silva, 1995
- Species: B. brevitarsus

Binomial name
- Baliopteridion brevitarsus Papp & Silva, 1995

Genus of flies

Baliopteridion is a monotypic neotropical genus of flies in the family Lauxaniidae. It contains a single species, Baliopteridion brevitarsus.
