= Arnomyia =

Scientific classification
- Kingdom: Animalia
- Phylum: Arthropoda
- Class: Insecta
- Order: Diptera
- Family: Lauxaniidae
- Subfamily: Lauxaniinae
- Genus: Arnomyia; Malloch, 1925

Type species
- Arnomyia nubeculosa Malloch, 1925

Genus of flies

Arnomyia is a genus of small flies of the family Lauxaniidae.

== Species ==
- A. immaculipennis Malloch, 1933
- A. taitensis (Frauenfeld, 1867)
