= Trisapromyza =

Scientific classification
- Domain: Eukaryota
- Kingdom: Animalia
- Phylum: Arthropoda
- Class: Insecta
- Order: Diptera
- Family: Lauxaniidae
- Genus: Trisapromyza; Shewell, 1986

Genus of flies

Trisapromyza is a genus of flies in the family Lauxaniidae. There are at least two described species in Trisapromyza.

== Species ==
These two species belong to the genus Trisapromyza:

- Trisapromyza pictipes (Becker, 1919)
- Trisapromyza vittigera (Coquillett, 1902)
