= Amblada atomaria =

Scientific classification
- Kingdom: Animalia
- Phylum: Arthropoda
- Clade: Pancrustacea
- Class: Insecta
- Order: Diptera
- Family: Lauxaniidae
- Subfamily: Lauxaniinae
- Genus: Amblada; Walker 1860
- Species: A. atomaria

Binomial name
- Amblada atomaria Walker 1860

Genus of flies

Amblada is a genus of small flies of the family Lauxaniidae. It contains only one species, Amblada atomaria.

== Distribution ==
Philippines, Sulawesi.
