= Xenopterella =

Scientific classification
- Kingdom: Animalia
- Phylum: Arthropoda
- Class: Insecta
- Order: Diptera
- Family: Lauxaniidae
- Subfamily: Lauxaniinae
- Genus: Xenopterella; Malloch, 1926

Type species
- Xenopterella obliqua Malloch, 1926

Genus of flies

Xenopterella is a genus of flies in the family Lauxaniidae. There are at least two described species in Xenopterella.

== Species ==
These two species belong to the genus Xenopterella:

- Xenopterella beameri Steyskal, 1965
- Xenopterella obliqua Malloch, 1926
