= Sciasminettia =

Scientific classification
- Kingdom: Animalia
- Phylum: Arthropoda
- Class: Insecta
- Order: Diptera
- Family: Lauxaniidae
- Subfamily: Lauxaniinae
- Genus: Sciasminettia; Shewell, 1986

Type species
- Sciasmomyia dichaetophora Hendel, 1907

Genus of flies

Sciasminettia is a genus of small Palearctic flies of the family Lauxaniidae.

== Species ==
- S. dichaetophora (Hendel, 1907)
- S. europaea Carles-Tolrá, 2006
- S. similis Shatalkin, 2000
