= Eusapromyza =

Scientific classification
- Domain: Eukaryota
- Kingdom: Animalia
- Phylum: Arthropoda
- Class: Insecta
- Order: Diptera
- Family: Lauxaniidae
- Subfamily: Lauxaniinae
- Genus: Eusapromyza; Malloch, 1923

Type species
- Sapromyza multipunctata Fallén, 1820

Genus of flies

Eusapromyza is a genus of small flies of the family Lauxaniidae.

== Species ==
- E. balioptera Czerny, 1932
- E. beraudi (Bezzi, 1909)
- E. martineki Shatalkin, 1998
- E. multipunctata (Fallén, 1820)
- E. poeciloptera (Loew, 1873)
