= Cnemacantha =

Scientific classification
- Domain: Eukaryota
- Kingdom: Animalia
- Phylum: Arthropoda
- Class: Insecta
- Order: Diptera
- Family: Lauxaniidae
- Subfamily: Lauxaniinae
- Genus: Cnemacantha; Macquart, 1835

Genus of flies

Cnemacantha is a genus of flies belonging to the family Lauxaniidae.

The genus was first described by Macquart in 1835.

The species of this genus are found in Europe.

== Species ==
- Cnemacantha muscaria (Fallen, 1823)
