= Eurychoromyiinae =

Scientific classification
- Domain: Eukaryota
- Kingdom: Animalia
- Phylum: Arthropoda
- Class: Insecta
- Order: Diptera
- Family: Lauxaniidae
- Subfamily: Eurychoromyiinae; Hendel, 1910

Subfamily of flies

The broad-headed flies is a subfamily of flies. Until 2010, they were known from only one species based on four specimens and placed in the family Eurychoromyiidae.

In 1903, C. A. W. Schnuse, collecting at Sarampiuni in the foothills of the Bolivian Andes, took four specimens, all female, of a fly with a strange broad, flat head. These were described as a new species Eurychoromyia mallea (ευρυς — broad; χορος — field; μυια – fly; malleus – hammer) by the Austrian entomologist Friedrich Georg Hendel. No specimens have been seen or collected since. Two of the specimens now reside in the Naturhistorisches Museum in Vienna. The other two specimens are in the Staatliches Museum für Tierkunde in Dresden. Hendel rated the species as "an isolated group of acalyptrate muscids". His judgement has been sustained, and they are now recognised as belonging to a distinct family Eurychoromyiidae. No other specimens have ever been identified as belonging to this family. Classification has proved difficult, the absence of any male specimens adding to the difficulties. Following Hennig (1958) they are here tentatively included in the superfamily Lauxanioidea. In 2010, Gaimari and Silva placed then as a subfamily within Lauxaniidae and added further genera, five of them new to science.

== Genera ==
- Choryeuromyia Gaimari & Silva, 2010
- Eurychoromyia Hendel, 1910
- Euryhendelimyia Gaimari & Silva, 2010
- Eurystratiomyia Gaimari & Silva, 2010
- Exalla Gaimari, 2011
- Physegeniopsis Gaimari & Silva, 2010
- Roryeuchomyia Gaimari & Silva, 2010
- Tauridion Papp & Silva 1995
