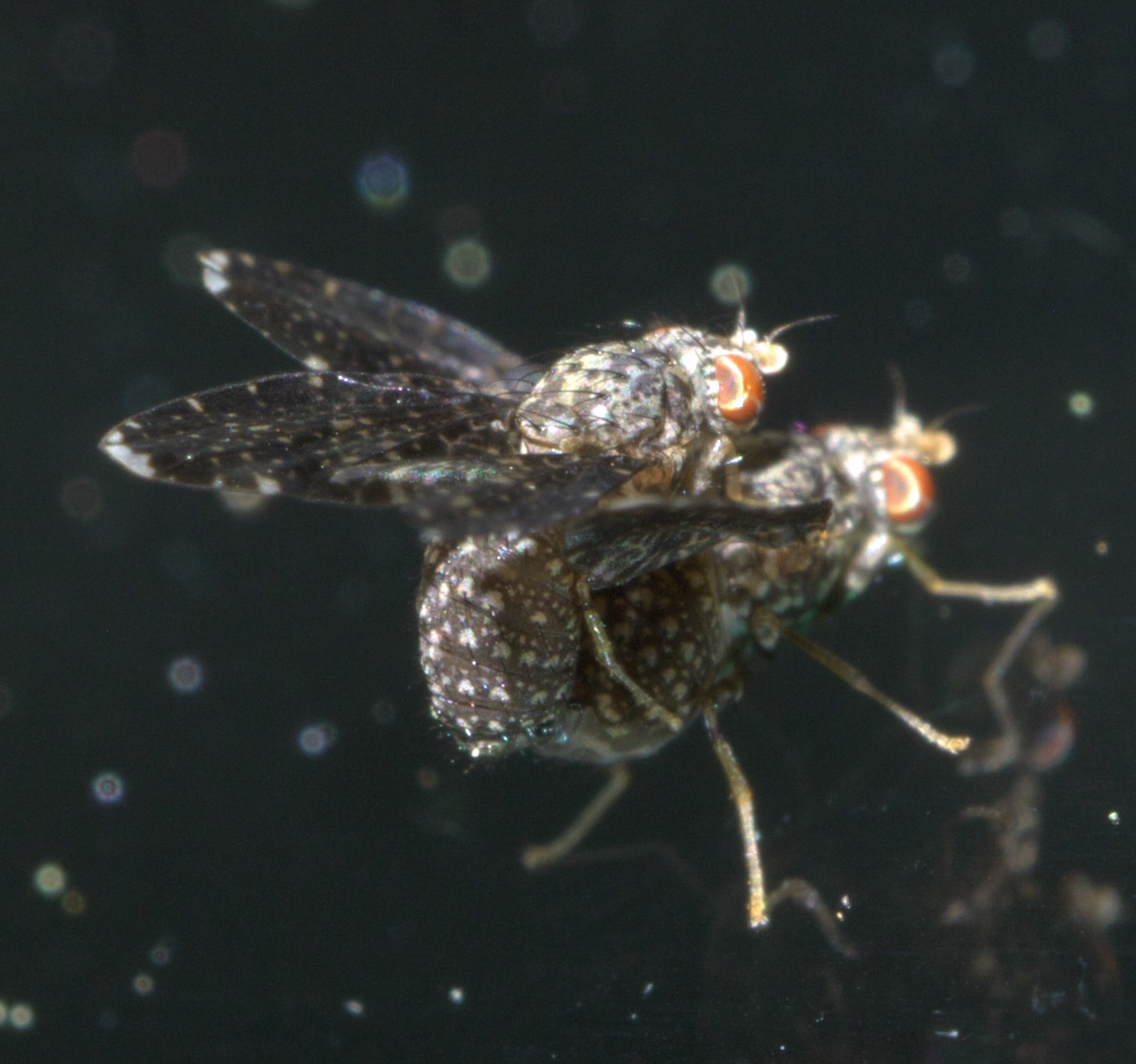

Scientific classification
- Domain: Eukaryota
- Kingdom: Animalia
- Phylum: Arthropoda
- Class: Insecta
- Order: Diptera
- Family: Lauxaniidae
- Subfamily: Homoneurinae
- Genus: Trypetisoma; Malloch, 1925

= Trypetisoma =

Genus of flies

Trypetisoma is a genus of flies in the family Lauxaniidae. There are more than 40 described species in Trypetisoma.

== Species ==
- Trypetisoma australe (Malloch, 1928)
- Trypetisoma ballinae Kim, 1994
- Trypetisoma bicincta (Meijere, 1910)
- Trypetisoma caniventre (Bezzi, 1928)
- Trypetisoma chauliodon Kim, 1994
- Trypetisoma cirrhicauda (Bezzi, 1928)
- Trypetisoma confusum (Malloch, 1940)
- Trypetisoma corniculatum Kim, 1994
- Trypetisoma costatum (Harrison, 1959)
- Trypetisoma cotterense Kim, 1994
- Trypetisoma cunnamullae Kim, 1994
- Trypetisoma cylindratum Kim, 1994
- Trypetisoma digitatum Kim, 1994
- Trypetisoma echinatum Kim, 1994
- Trypetisoma eutretoides Arnaud, 1968
- Trypetisoma fenestrata (Meijere, 1910)
- Trypetisoma guttatum (Tonnoir & Malloch, 1926)
- Trypetisoma horizontale Kim, 1994
- Trypetisoma hyalipunctum (Malloch, 1929)
- Trypetisoma ilukae Kim, 1994
- Trypetisoma leucostictum (Bezzi, 1928)
- Trypetisoma lidgbirdense Kim, 1994
- Trypetisoma lobion Kim, 1994
- Trypetisoma macalpinei Kim, 1994
- Trypetisoma magnum Kim, 1994
- Trypetisoma major (Malloch, 1929)
- Trypetisoma morio (Meijere, 1910)
- Trypetisoma octopunctatum (Malloch, 1929)
- Trypetisoma pulchripennis Shewell, 1977
- Trypetisoma puncticeps (Malloch, 1929)
- Trypetisoma rhamphis Kim, 1994
- Trypetisoma rottnestense Kim, 1994
- Trypetisoma samoaense (Malloch, 1929)
- Trypetisoma scalenum Kim, 1994
- Trypetisoma sentipeniculus Kim, 1994
- Trypetisoma shewelli Arnaud, 1968
- Trypetisoma steriphomorpha Kim, 1994
- Trypetisoma sticticum (Loew, 1863)
- Trypetisoma sumatrana (Malloch, 1927)
- Trypetisoma tenuipenne (Malloch, 1930)
- Trypetisoma tephritina (Meijere, 1914)
- Trypetisoma tomentosum Kim, 1994
- Trypetisoma tricincta (Malloch, 1927)
- Trypetisoma trypetiformis (Meijere, 1910)
- Trypetisoma uptoni Kim, 1994
- Trypetisoma vulgare Kim, 1994
- Trypetisoma zacatecasense Arnaud & Gelhaus, 1980
