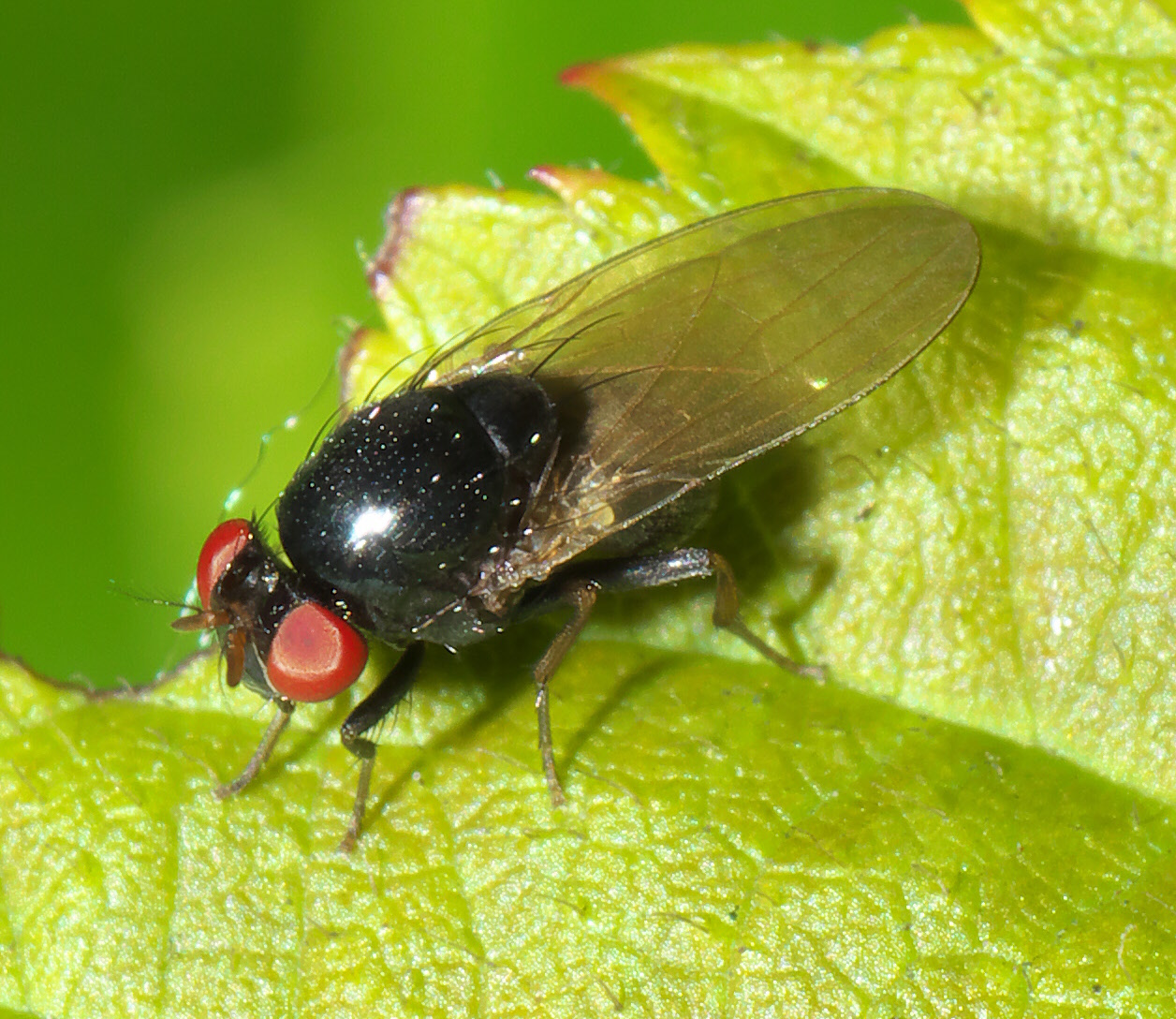

Scientific classification
- Kingdom: Animalia
- Phylum: Arthropoda
- Class: Insecta
- Order: Diptera
- Family: Lauxaniidae
- Subfamily: Lauxaniinae
- Genus: Xenochaetina; Malloch, 1923

Type species
- Lauxania muscaria Loew, 1861

Synonyms
- Allogriphoneura Hendel, 1925; Haakonia Curran, 1942

= Xenochaetina =

Genus of flies

Xenochaetina is a genus of flies in the family Lauxaniidae. There are about 11 described species in Xenochaetina.

== Species ==
- Xenochaetina aeneoides Hendel, 1932
- Xenochaetina crassimana Malloch, 1926
- Xenochaetina ferruginosa Hendel, 1926
- Xenochaetina flavipennis (Fabricius, 1805)
- Xenochaetina leucostoma Hendel, 1936
- Xenochaetina opaca Hendel, 1936
- Xenochaetina pallida Malloch, 1923
- Xenochaetina polita Malloch, 1925
- Xenochaetina porcaria (Fabricius, 1805)
- Xenochaetina setitibia Malloch, 1925
