= Choryeuromyia =

Scientific classification
- Kingdom: Animalia
- Phylum: Arthropoda
- Class: Insecta
- Order: Diptera
- Family: Lauxaniidae
- Subfamily: Eurychoromyiinae
- Genus: Choryeuromyia; Gaimari & Silva, 2010
- Species: C. xenisma

Binomial name
- Choryeuromyia xenisma Gaimari & Silva, 2010

Species of fly

Choryeuromyia xenisma is a species of flies in the subfamily Eurychoromyiinae.

== Distribution ==
Costa Rica.
