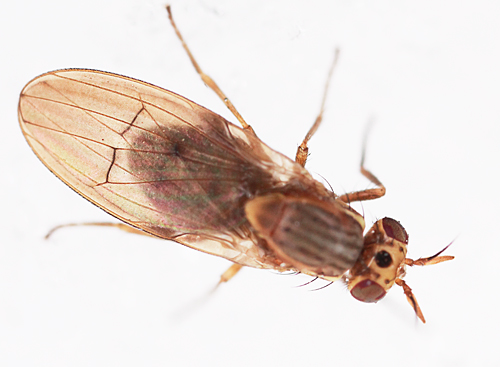
- Pachycerina seticornis

Scientific classification
- Domain: Eukaryota
- Kingdom: Animalia
- Phylum: Arthropoda
- Class: Insecta
- Order: Diptera
- Family: Lauxaniidae
- Genus: Pachycerina; Macquart, 1835

= Pachycerina =

Genus of flies

Pachycerina is a genus of flies belonging to the family Lauxaniidae.

The species of this genus are found in Southern Africa.

== Species ==
Species include:

- Pachycerina alpicola (Czerny, 1932)
- Pachycerina alutacea Shatalkin, 1999
- Pachycerina atrimela Davies & Miller, 2009
- Pachycerina carinata Shi, Wu & Yang, 2009
- Pachycerina crinicornis (Thomson, 1869)
- Pachycerina decemlineata Meijere, 1914
- Pachycerina flaviventris Malloch, 1929
- Pachycerina gabela Davies & Miller, 2009
- Pachycerina javana (Macquart, 1851)
- Pachycerina latifrons (Thomson, 1869)
- Pachycerina longistylata Sasakawa & Kozánek, 1995
- Pachycerina micropunctata Davies & Miller, 2009
- Pachycerina nigrivittata Davies & Miller, 2009
- Pachycerina ninae Shatalkin, 1996
- Pachycerina obscuripennis Lamb, 1912
- Pachycerina ocellaris (Kertész, 1915)
- Pachycerina parvicepunctata Meijere, 1914
- Pachycerina pellocera Davies & Miller, 2009
- Pachycerina plumosa Kertész, 1915
- Pachycerina potentilla Davies & Miller, 2009
- Pachycerina pulchra (Loew, 1850)
- Pachycerina seticornis (Fallén, 1820)
- Pachycerina sexlineata Meijere, 1914
- Pachycerina seychellensis Lamb, 1912
- Pachycerina sigillata (Meijere, 1910)
- Pachycerina stuckenbergi Davies & Miller, 2009
- Pachycerina tripunctata Strobl, 1880
- Pachycerina vaga Adams, 1905
