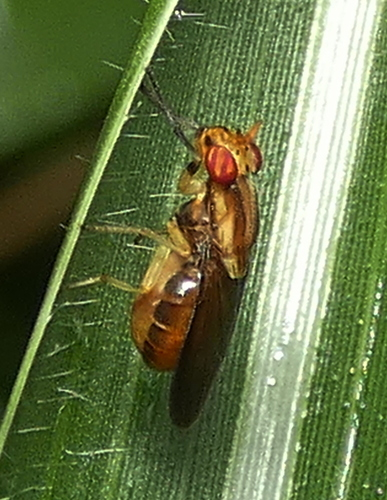

Scientific classification
- Kingdom: Animalia
- Phylum: Arthropoda
- Clade: Pancrustacea
- Class: Insecta
- Order: Diptera
- Family: Lauxaniidae
- Subfamily: Lauxaniinae
- Genus: Physegenua; Macquart, 1848

= Physegenua =

Genus of flies

Physegenua is a neotropical genus of flies in the family Lauxaniidae.

== Species ==
These 11 species belong to the genus Physegenua:

- Physegenua annulata (Macquart, 1844)
- Physegenua banksi Curran, 1942
- Physegenua centralis Curran, 1942
- Physegenua eronis Curran, 1942
- Physegenua ferruginea Schiner, 1868
- Physegenua lineata Curran, 1942
- Physegenua obscuripennis (Bigot, 1857)
- Physegenua striatopunctata Hendel, 1926
- Physegenua urina (Giglio-Tos, 1893)
- Physegenua vittata Macquart, 1848
- Physegenua vittifrons Hendel, 1926
