= Agriphoneura =

Scientific classification
- Kingdom: Animalia
- Phylum: Arthropoda
- Class: Insecta
- Order: Diptera
- Family: Lauxaniidae
- Subfamily: Lauxaniinae
- Genus: Agriphoneura; Hendel, 1926
- Species: A. fumipennis

Binomial name
- Agriphoneura fumipennis Hendel, 1926

Genus of flies

Agriphoneura is a genus of small flies of the family Lauxaniidae. It contains only one species, Agriphoneura fumipennis.

== Distribution ==
Bolivia.
