= Eurychoromyia =

Scientific classification
- Domain: Eukaryota
- Kingdom: Animalia
- Phylum: Arthropoda
- Class: Insecta
- Order: Diptera
- Family: Lauxaniidae
- Subfamily: Eurychoromyiinae
- Genus: Eurychoromyia; Hendel, 1910
- Species: E. mallea

Binomial name
- Eurychoromyia mallea Hendel, 1910

Species of fly

Eurychoromyia mallea, the broad-headed fly, is a species of flies in the subfamily Eurychoromyiinae.

In 1903, C. A. W. Schnuse, collecting at Sarampiuni in the foothills of the Bolivian Andes, took 4 specimens, all female, of a fly with a strange broad, flat head. These were described as a new species Eurychoromyia mallea (ευρυς — broad; χορος — field; μυια — fly; malleus — hammer) by the Austrian entomologist Friedrich Georg Hendel. No specimens have been seen or collected since. Two of the specimens now reside in the Naturhistorisches Museum in Vienna. The other two specimens are in the Staatliches Museum für Tierkunde in Dresden. Hendel rated the species as "an isolated group of acalyptrate muscids". His judgement has been sustained, and they are now recognised as belonging to a distinct family Eurychoromyiidae. No other specimens have ever been identified as belonging to this family. Classification has proved difficult, the absence of any male specimens adding to the difficulties. Following Hennig (1958) they are here tentatively included in the superfamily Lauxanioidea. In 2010 Gaimari & Silva placed then as a subfamily within Lauxaniidae and added further genera, 5 of them new to science.

E. mallea is a shiny, peach-brown insect, 5 mm (0.2 in) in length, with a head 2.5 mm (0.1 in) wide. The immature stages and male specimens have not been seen.
