= Asilostoma =

Scientific classification
- Kingdom: Animalia
- Phylum: Arthropoda
- Class: Insecta
- Order: Diptera
- Family: Lauxaniidae
- Subfamily: Lauxaniinae
- Genus: Asilostoma; Hendel, 1925

Genus of flies

Asilostoma is a neotropical genus of flies in the family Lauxaniidae.

== Species ==
These 5 species belong to the genus Asilostoma:

- A. atriceps Malloch, 1928
- A. enderleini Hendel, 1925
- A. flavifacies Malloch, 1928
- A. pallipes Malloch, 1928
- A. palpalis Malloch, 1928
