= Euryhendelimyia =

Scientific classification
- Kingdom: Animalia
- Phylum: Arthropoda
- Class: Insecta
- Order: Diptera
- Family: Lauxaniidae
- Subfamily: Eurychoromyiinae
- Genus: Euryhendelimyia; Gaimari & Silva, 2010
- Species: E. schlingeri

Binomial name
- Euryhendelimyia schlingeri Gaimari & Silva, 2010

Species of fly

Euryhendelimyia schlingeri is a species of flies in the subfamily Eurychoromyiinae.

== Distribution ==
Colombia.
