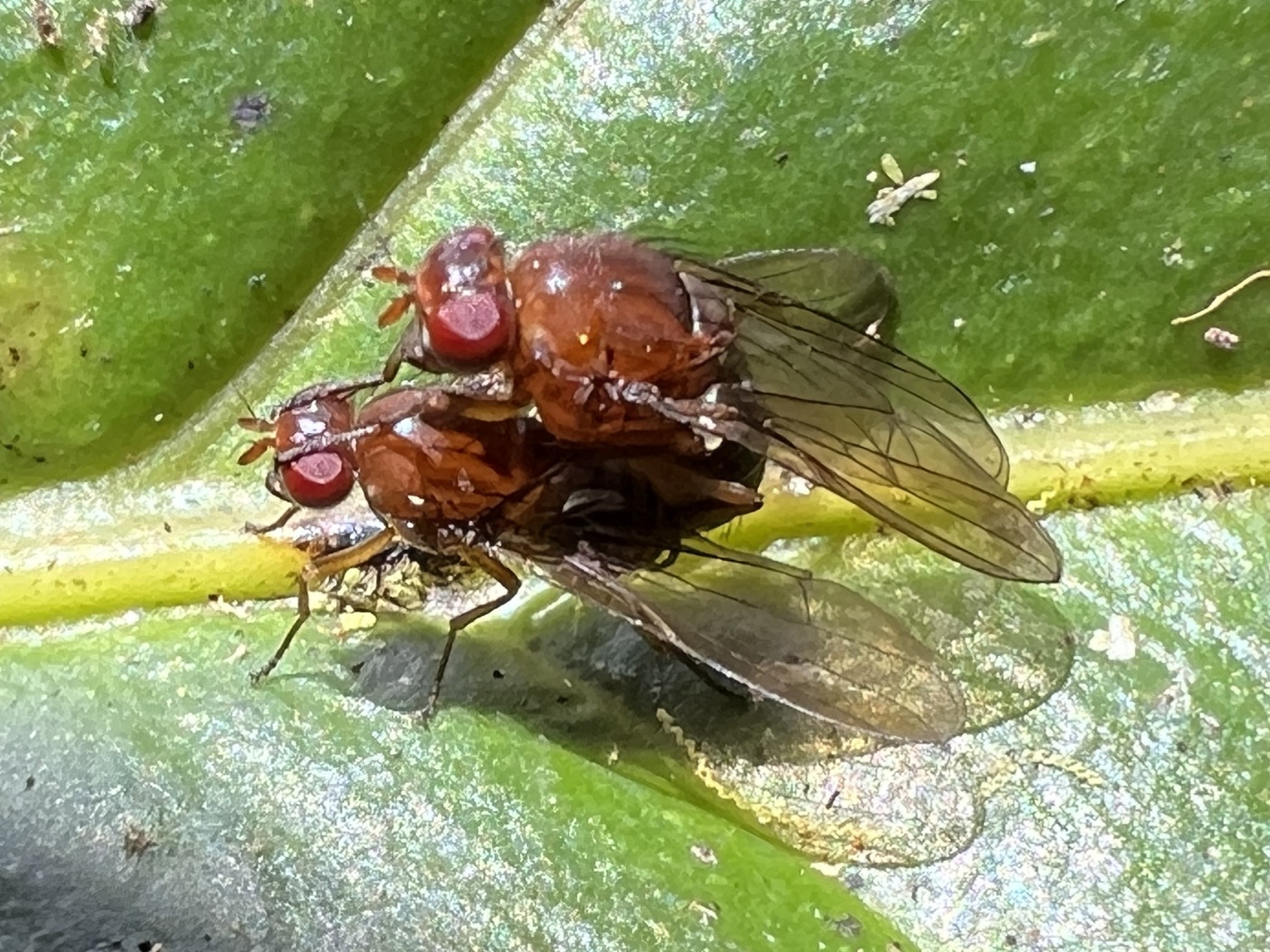
- Griphoneura ferruginea

Scientific classification
- Domain: Eukaryota
- Kingdom: Animalia
- Phylum: Arthropoda
- Class: Insecta
- Order: Diptera
- Subsection: Acalyptratae
- Superfamily: Lauxanioidea
- Family: Lauxaniidae
- Genus: Griphoneura; Schiner, 1868

Type species
- Lauxania imbuta Wiedemann, 1830

= Griphoneura =

Genus of flies

Griphoneura is a genus of flies in the family Lauxaniidae. There are about 8 described species in Griphoneura.

== Species ==
These 8 species belong to the genus Griphoneura:

- G. affinis Malloch, 1925
- G. alboapicata Malloch, 1925
- G. ferruginea Schiner, 1868
- G. imbuta Wiedemann, 1830
- G. nigricornis Curran, 1938
- G. proxima Hendel, 1926
- G. tarsalis Curran, 1938
- G. triangulata Hendel, 1926
