= Aulogastromyia =

Scientific classification
- Domain: Eukaryota
- Kingdom: Animalia
- Phylum: Arthropoda
- Class: Insecta
- Order: Diptera
- Family: Lauxaniidae
- Subfamily: Lauxaniinae
- Genus: Aulogastromyia; Hendel, 1925

Type species
- Sapromyza anisodactyla Loew, 1845

Genus of flies

Aulogastromyia is a genus of small flies of the family Lauxaniidae.

== Species ==
- A. anisodactyla (Loew, 1845)
- A. rohdendorfi Shatalkin, 1993
