= Allogriphoneura =

Scientific classification
- Kingdom: Animalia
- Phylum: Arthropoda
- Class: Insecta
- Order: Diptera
- Family: Lauxaniidae
- Subfamily: Lauxaniinae
- Genus: Allogriphoneura; Hendel, 1926

Genus of flies

Allogriphoneura is a genus of small flies of the family Lauxaniidae.

== Species ==
- A. annuliventris Hendel, 1926
- A. phacosoma Hendel, 1926
