= Tauridion =

Scientific classification
- Kingdom: Animalia
- Phylum: Arthropoda
- Class: Insecta
- Order: Diptera
- Family: Lauxaniidae
- Subfamily: Eurychoromyiinae
- Genus: Tauridion; Papp & Silva, 1995
- Species: T. shewelli

Binomial name
- Tauridion shewelli Papp & Silva, 1995

Species of fly

Tauridion shewelli is a species of flies in the subfamily Eurychoromyiinae.

== Distribution ==
Peru.
