= Exalla =

Scientific classification
- Kingdom: Animalia
- Phylum: Arthropoda
- Class: Insecta
- Order: Diptera
- Family: Lauxaniidae
- Subfamily: Eurychoromyiinae
- Genus: Exalla; Gaimari, 2011

Type species
- Exalla shewelli Gaimari, 2011

Genus of flies

Exalla is a genus of flies in the family Lauxaniidae.

== Distribution ==
The species are known from wet montane rainforest habitats in Colombia and Ecuador at elevations above 1500 meters.

== Species ==
- Exalla browni Gaimari, 2012
- Exalla macalpinei Gaimari, 2012
- Exalla shewelli Gaimari, 2012
