= Parapachycerina =

Scientific classification
- Kingdom: Animalia
- Phylum: Arthropoda
- Class: Insecta
- Order: Diptera
- Family: Lauxaniidae
- Subfamily: Lauxaniinae
- Genus: Parapachycerina; Stuckenberg, 1971

Type species
- Parapachycerina munroi Stuckenberg, 1971

Genus of flies

Parapachycerina is a genus of small African flies of the family Lauxaniidae. They are mostly yellow-orange in colour.

== Species ==
- Parapachycerina bispina Davies & Miller, 2008
- Parapachycerina infuscata Davies & Miller, 2008
- Parapachycerina lalitra Davies & Miller, 2008
- Parapachycerina munroi Stuckenberg, 1971
- Parapachycerina talea Davies & Miller, 2008
