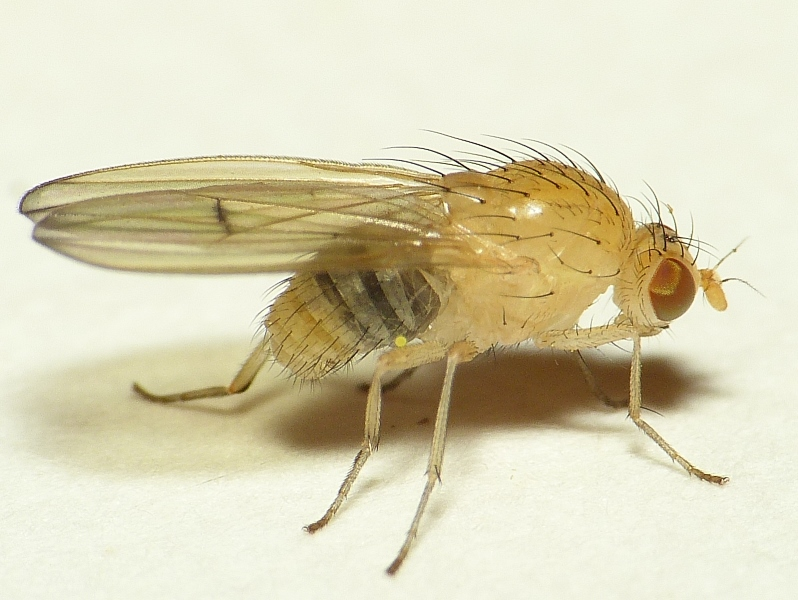
- Tricholauxania praeusta male

Scientific classification
- Domain: Eukaryota
- Kingdom: Animalia
- Phylum: Arthropoda
- Class: Insecta
- Order: Diptera
- Family: Lauxaniidae
- Subfamily: Lauxaniinae
- Genus: Tricholauxania; Hendel, 1925

Type species
- Sapromyza praeusta Fallén, 1820

= Tricholauxania =

Genus of flies

Tricholauxania is a genus of small flies of the family Lauxaniidae.

== Species ==
- Tricholauxania praeusta (Fallén, 1820)
- Tricholauxania claripennis Remm, 1991
