= Xeniconeura =

Scientific classification
- Kingdom: Animalia
- Phylum: Arthropoda
- Class: Insecta
- Order: Diptera
- Family: Lauxaniidae
- Genus: Xeniconeura; Shewell, 1986
- Species: X. costalis

Binomial name
- Xeniconeura costalis (Curran, 1942)

Synonyms
- Xenopterella costalis Curran, 1942

Genus of flies

Xeniconeura is a genus of flies in the family Lauxaniidae. There is one described species in Xeniconeura, X. costalis.

== Distribution ==
USA (Colorado), Mexico.
