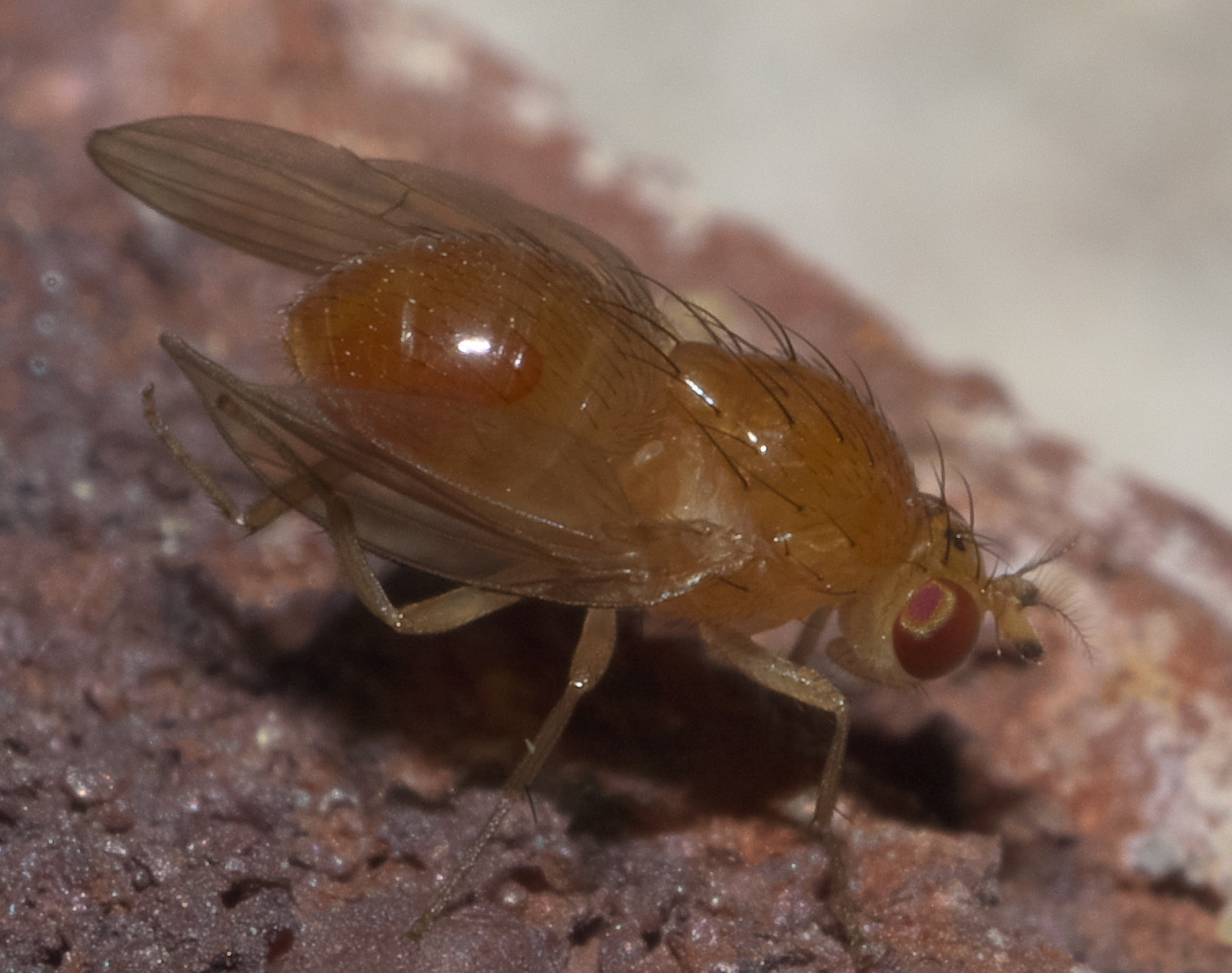

Scientific classification
- Domain: Eukaryota
- Kingdom: Animalia
- Phylum: Arthropoda
- Class: Insecta
- Order: Diptera
- Family: Lauxaniidae
- Subfamily: Lauxaniinae
- Genus: Camptoprosopella; Hendel, 1907

Type species
- Camptoprosopella melanoptera Hendel, 1907

= Camptoprosopella =

Genus of flies

Camptoprosopella is a genus of flies in the family Lauxaniidae. There are more than 30 described species in Camptoprosopella.

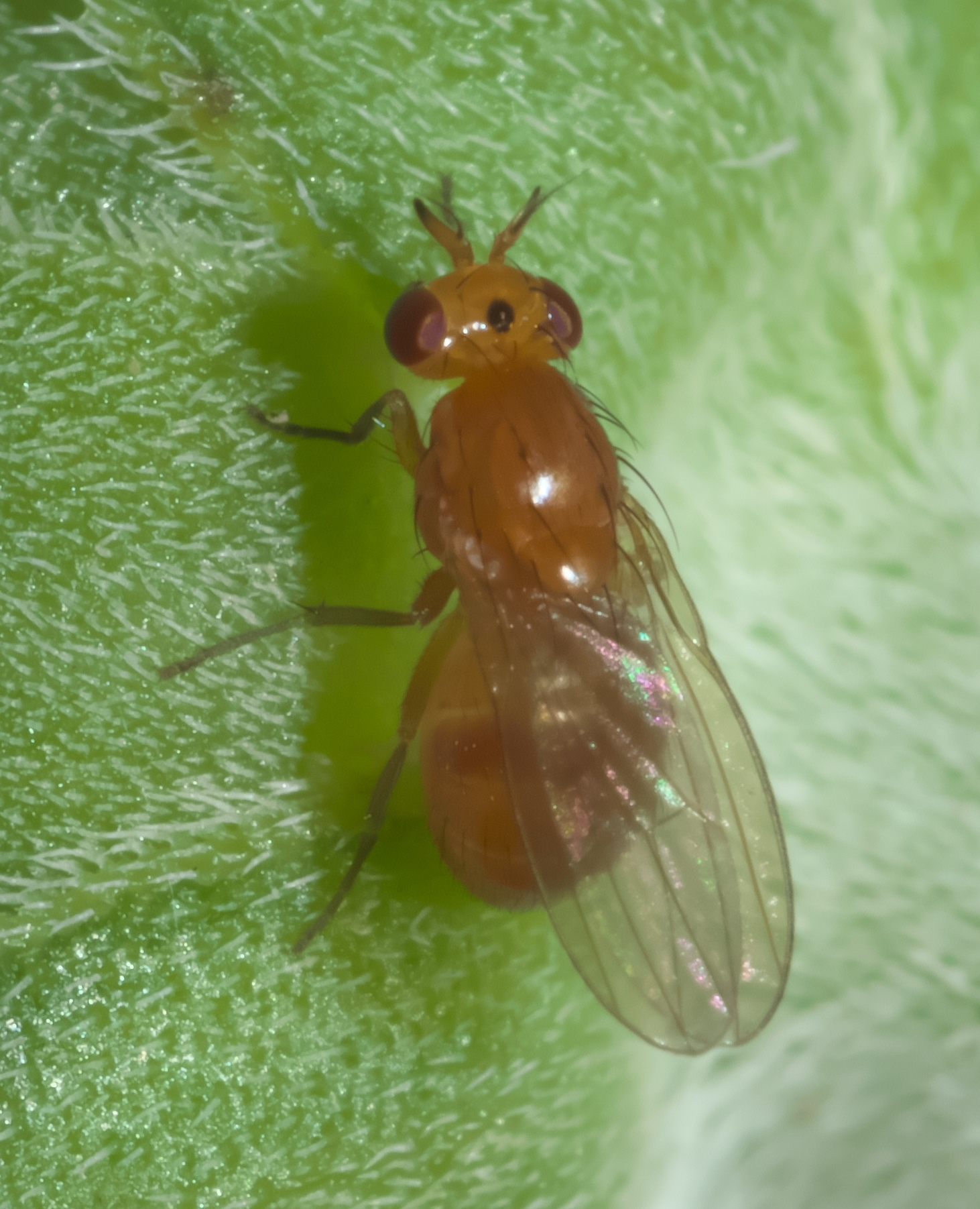

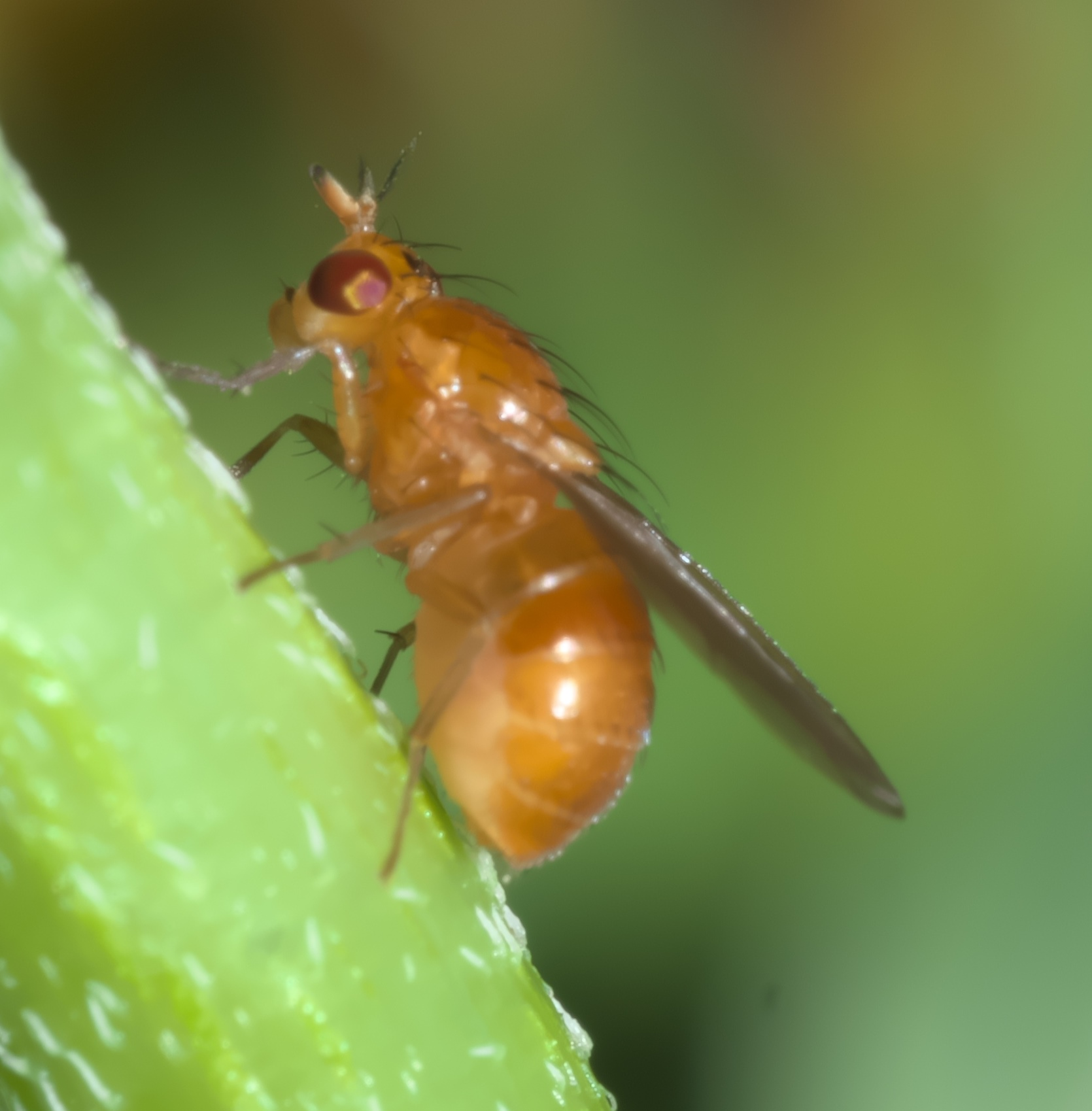

== Species ==
- Camptoprosopella acuticornis Shewell, 1939
- Camptoprosopella angulata Shewell, 1939
- Camptoprosopella antennalis (Fitch, 1856)
- Camptoprosopella atra Malloch, 1926
- Camptoprosopella borealis Shewell, 1939
- Camptoprosopella cincta (Loew, 1861)
- Camptoprosopella confusa Shewell, 1939
- Camptoprosopella cruda Shewell, 1939
- Camptoprosopella cubana Shewell, 1939
- Camptoprosopella decolor Shewell, 1939
- Camptoprosopella diversa Curran, 1926
- Camptoprosopella dolorosa (Williston, 1903)
- Camptoprosopella equatorialis Shewell, 1939
- Camptoprosopella flavipalpis Malloch, 1926
- Camptoprosopella gracilis Shewell, 1939
- Camptoprosopella hera Shewell, 1939
- Camptoprosopella imitatrix Shewell, 1939
- Camptoprosopella latipunctata Malloch, 1926
- Camptoprosopella longisetosa Shewell, 1939
- Camptoprosopella maculipennis Malloch, 1923
- Camptoprosopella mallochi Shewell, 1939
- Camptoprosopella media Shewell, 1939
- Camptoprosopella nigra Malloch, 1933
- Camptoprosopella ocellaris (Townsend, 1892)
- Camptoprosopella pallidicornis Shewell, 1939
- Camptoprosopella plumata (Wulp, 1867)
- Camptoprosopella resinosa (Wiedemann, 1830)
- Camptoprosopella setipalpis Shewell, 1939
- Camptoprosopella slossonae Shewell, 1939
- Camptoprosopella texana Shewell, 1939
- Camptoprosopella varia Shewell, 1939
- Camptoprosopella verticalis (Loew, 1861)
- Camptoprosopella vulgaris (Fitch, 1856)
- Camptoprosopella xanthoptera Hendel, 1907
