= Roryeuchomyia =

Scientific classification
- Kingdom: Animalia
- Phylum: Arthropoda
- Class: Insecta
- Order: Diptera
- Family: Lauxaniidae
- Subfamily: Eurychoromyiinae
- Genus: Roryeuchomyia; Gaimari & Silva, 2010
- Species: R. tigrina

Binomial name
- Roryeuchomyia tigrina Gaimari & Silva, 2010

Species of fly

Roryeuchomyia tigrina is a species of flies in the subfamily Eurychoromyiinae.

== Distribution ==
Brazil, Ecuador.
