= Poecilominettia =

Scientific classification
- Domain: Eukaryota
- Kingdom: Animalia
- Phylum: Arthropoda
- Class: Insecta
- Order: Diptera
- Family: Lauxaniidae
- Genus: Poecilominettia; Hendel, 1932

Genus of flies

Poecilominettia is a genus of flies in the family Lauxaniidae. There are more than 60 described species in Poecilominettia.

== Species ==
These 69 species belong to the genus Poecilominettia:

- Poecilominettia acuta Broadhead, 1989
- Poecilominettia aurita Broadhead, 1989
- Poecilominettia biprojecta Broadhead, 1989
- Poecilominettia breviplumata Hendel, 1932
- Poecilominettia brunneicosta (Malloch, 1928)
- Poecilominettia calva Broadhead, 1989
- Poecilominettia chelata Broadhead, 1989
- Poecilominettia circularis Broadhead, 1989
- Poecilominettia circumtexta Broadhead, 1989
- Poecilominettia cordata Broadhead, 1989
- Poecilominettia cornuta Broadhead, 1989
- Poecilominettia curvata Broadhead, 1989
- Poecilominettia effossa Broadhead, 1989
- Poecilominettia enormis Broadhead, 1989
- Poecilominettia epacra Broadhead, 1989
- Poecilominettia erymna Broadhead, 1989
- Poecilominettia falcata Broadhead, 1989
- Poecilominettia fimbriata Broadhead, 1989
- Poecilominettia flavescens Broadhead, 1989
- Poecilominettia foliacea Broadhead, 1989
- Poecilominettia folleata Broadhead, 1989
- Poecilominettia fornicata Broadhead, 1989
- Poecilominettia fortuna Broadhead, 1989
- Poecilominettia fortunae Broadhead, 1989
- Poecilominettia fumida Broadhead, 1989
- Poecilominettia fungivora Broadhead, 1989
- Poecilominettia gatuna Broadhead, 1989
- Poecilominettia grata (Wiedemann, 1830)
- Poecilominettia lagenata Broadhead, 1989
- Poecilominettia legnota Broadhead, 1989
- Poecilominettia lineolata Broadhead, 1989
- Poecilominettia macula (Loew, 1872)
- Poecilominettia maniculata Broadhead, 1989
- Poecilominettia membranosa Broadhead, 1989
- Poecilominettia nigriapica Broadhead, 1989
- Poecilominettia notata Broadhead, 1989
- Poecilominettia obtusa Broadhead, 1989
- Poecilominettia octovittata (Williston, 1896)
- Poecilominettia ordinaria (Melander, 1913)
- Poecilominettia papillata Broadhead, 1989
- Poecilominettia paronatia Broadhead, 1989
- Poecilominettia parouatia Broadhead, 1989
- Poecilominettia pectinata Broadhead, 1989
- Poecilominettia pedata Broadhead, 1989
- Poecilominettia picticornis (Coquillett, 1904)
- Poecilominettia plicata Broadhead, 1989
- Poecilominettia puncticeps (Coquillett, 1902)
- Poecilominettia punctifer (Malloch, 1920)
- Poecilominettia pygmaea Broadhead, 1989
- Poecilominettia quadrata (Malloch, 1928)
- Poecilominettia quadriprojecta Broadhead, 1989
- Poecilominettia remata Broadhead, 1989
- Poecilominettia semilunata Broadhead, 1989
- Poecilominettia sentosa Broadhead, 1989
- Poecilominettia sexiprojecta Broadhead, 1989
- Poecilominettia sexseriata Hendel, 1932
- Poecilominettia silbergliedi Broadhead, 1989
- Poecilominettia silvicola Broadhead, 1989
- Poecilominettia slossonae (Coquillett, 1898)
- Poecilominettia spinosa Broadhead, 1989
- Poecilominettia trigona Broadhead, 1989
- Poecilominettia tripuncticeps (Malloch, 1926)
- Poecilominettia uncata Broadhead, 1989
- Poecilominettia ungulata Broadhead, 1989
- Poecilominettia unicolor Hendel, 1932
- Poecilominettia valida (Walker, 1858)
- Poecilominettia vibrata Broadhead, 1989
- Poecilominettia virgea Broadhead, 1989
- Poecilominettia zebroides (Hendel, 1926)
