= Eurystratiomyia =

Scientific classification
- Kingdom: Animalia
- Phylum: Arthropoda
- Class: Insecta
- Order: Diptera
- Family: Lauxaniidae
- Subfamily: Eurychoromyiinae
- Genus: Eurystratiomyia; Gaimari, 2010

Type species
- Eurystratiomyia erwini Gaimari, 2010

Genus of flies

Eurystratiomyia is a genus of flies in the family Lauxaniidae.

== Species ==
- Eurystratiomyia epacrovitta Gaimari, 2010
- Eurystratiomyia erwini Gaimari, 2010
