= Allominettia =

Scientific classification
- Kingdom: Animalia
- Phylum: Arthropoda
- Class: Insecta
- Order: Diptera
- Family: Lauxaniidae
- Subfamily: Lauxaniinae
- Genus: Allominettia; Hendel, 1926

Type species
- Allominettia maculatifrons Hendel, 1925

Genus of flies

Allominettia is a genus of small flies of the family Lauxaniidae.

== Species ==
- A. bimaculata (Malloch, 1928)
- A. corollae (Fabricius, 1805)
- A. fuscipes (Macquart, 1843)
- A. mactans (Fabricius, 1794)
- A. maculatifrons Hendel, 1925
- A. pulchrifrons (Hendel, 1926)
- A. woldae (Broadhead, 1989)
