= Afrominettia =

Scientific classification
- Kingdom: Animalia
- Phylum: Arthropoda
- Class: Insecta
- Order: Diptera
- Family: Lauxaniidae
- Subfamily: Lauxaniinae
- Genus: Afrominettia; Stuckenberg, 1971

Type species
- Suillia jeanneli Séguy, 1938

Genus of flies

Afrominettia is a genus of small flies of the family Lauxaniidae.

== Species ==
- A. jeanneli (Séguy, 1938)
