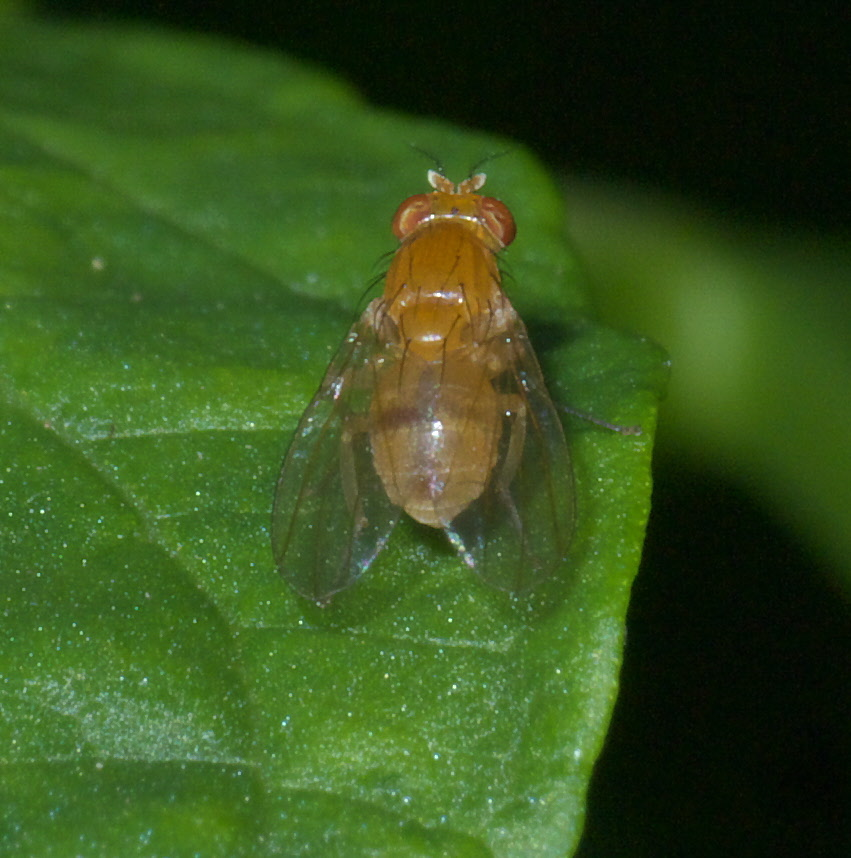
- Neogriphoneura sordida

Scientific classification
- Kingdom: Animalia
- Phylum: Arthropoda
- Class: Insecta
- Order: Diptera
- Superfamily: Lauxanioidea
- Family: Lauxaniidae
- Subfamily: Lauxaniinae
- Genus: Neogriphoneura; Malloch, 1924

Type species
- Sapromyza sordida Wiedemann, 1830

Synonyms
- Rhabdolauxania Hendel, 1925

= Neogriphoneura =

Genus of flies

Neogriphoneura is a primarily neotropical genus of flies in the family Lauxaniidae. One species, N. sordida, ranges into the Nearctic. There are about 11 described species in Neogriphoneura.

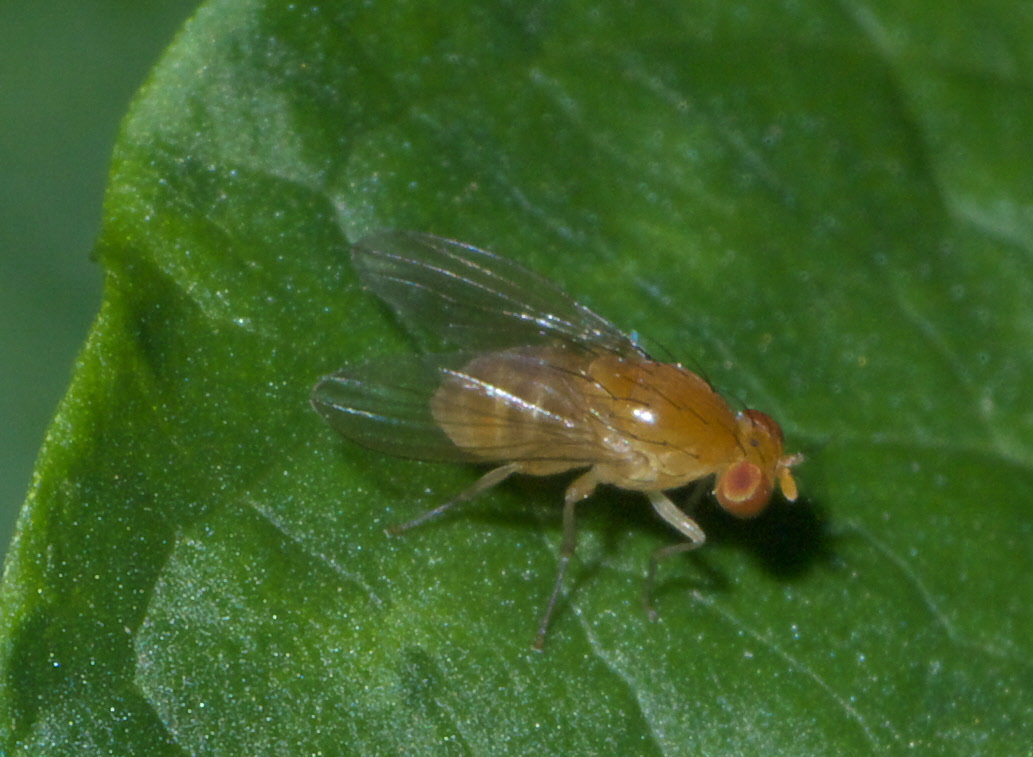
Neogriphoneura sordida

== Species ==
These 11 species belong to the genus Neogriphoneura:

- N. bispoi Mello & Silva, 2008
- N. corrugata Mello & Silva, 2008
- N. immaculata Hendel, 1933
- N. laevifrons Hendel, 1925
- N. pacata Mello & Silva, 2008
- N. schnusei Hendel, 1925
- N. sordida (Wiedemann, 1830)
- N. striatifrons Hendel, 1932
- N. striga Curran, 1942
- N. tertia Curran, 1942
- N. timida Curran, 1942
