= Melanomyza =

Scientific classification
- Domain: Eukaryota
- Kingdom: Animalia
- Phylum: Arthropoda
- Class: Insecta
- Order: Diptera
- Family: Lauxaniidae
- Genus: Melanomyza; Malloch, 1923

Genus of flies

Melanomyza is a genus of flies in the family Lauxaniidae. There are about 12 described species in Melanomyza.

== Species ==
These 11 species belong to the genus Melanomyza:

- Melanomyza (Lauxaniella) femoralis (Loew, 1861)
- Melanomyza (Melanomyza) floridensis (Curran, 1942)
- Melanomyza (Melanomyza) gracilipes (Loew, 1861)
- Melanomyza (Lauxaniella) intermedia (Malloch, 1923)
- Melanomyza (Lauxaniella) manuleata (Loew, 1861)
- Melanomyza (?) nigerrima (Becker, 1919)
- Melanomyza (Lauxaniella) nubecula Malloch, 1926
- Melanomyza (Lauxaniella) scutellata (Malloch, 1923)
- Melanomyza (Lauxaniella) signatifrons (Coquillett, 1904)
- Melanomyza (Lauxaniella) tenicornis Malloch, 1927
- Melanomyza (Lauxaniella) trivittata (Loew, 1861)
