= Neoparoecus =

Scientific classification
- Kingdom: Animalia
- Phylum: Arthropoda
- Class: Insecta
- Order: Diptera
- Family: Lauxaniidae
- Subfamily: Lauxaniinae
- Genus: Neoparoecus; Özdikmen & Merz, 2006

Type species
- Paroecus signatipes Loew, 1856

Synonyms
- Paroecus Loew, 1856

Genus of flies

Neoparoecus is a genus of small flies of the family Lauxaniidae.

== Species ==
- Neoparoecus gorodkovi (Shatalkin, 1992)
- Neoparoecus sapromyzina (Shatalkin, 1998)
- Neoparoecus signatipes (Loew, 1856)
- Neoparoecus simplicipes (Yarom, 1991)
- Neoparoecus tibialis (Yarom, 1991)
