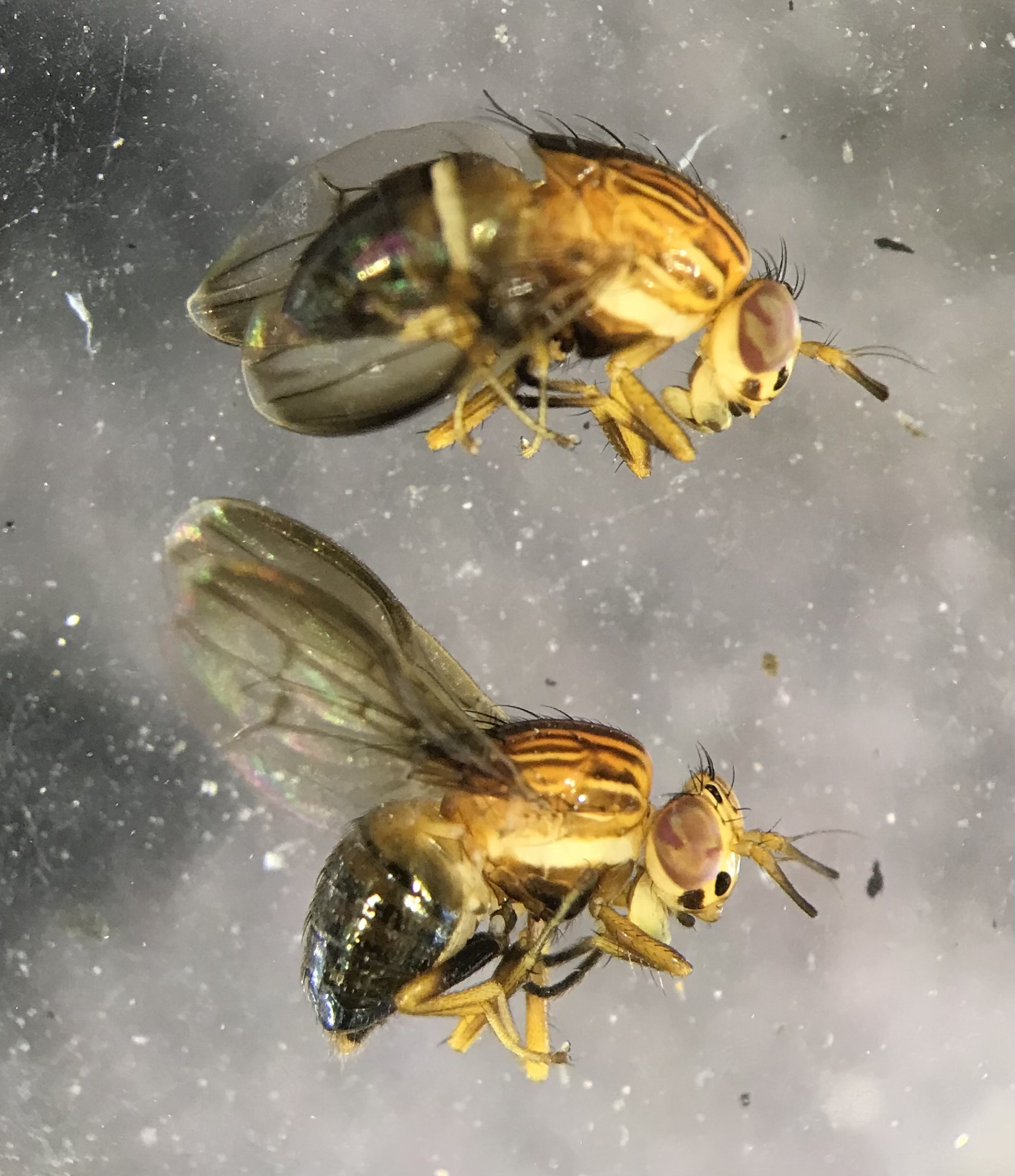

Scientific classification
- Kingdom: Animalia
- Phylum: Arthropoda
- Class: Insecta
- Order: Diptera
- Family: Lauxaniidae
- Genus: Steganopsis
- Species: S. melanogaster

Binomial name
- Steganopsis melanogaster (Thomson, 1869)

Synonyms
- Lauxania melanogaster Thomson, 1869; Steganopsis vittithorax Kertész, 1915

= Steganopsis melanogaster =

Species of fly

Steganopsis melanogaster is a species of fly in the family Lauxaniidae. It is known from Australia and Norfolk Island.

== Description ==
As part of family Lauxaniidae, S. melanogaster has a head with convergent postocellar bristles and without vibrissae, the thorax has an anepisternal bristle on each side, and vein C of the wing is unbroken.

For features specific to this species, S. melanogaster is about 3 mm long with an abdomen that is mostly glossy black and wings that are brown except for the transparent white tips. The frons of the head is dull yellow with a large velvety black ocellar mark and brownish marks at the bases of the orbital bristles. The face has a large violet-black spot on each side. The middle of the fore tibia and the base of the hind femur are darkened. The second vein of the wing is close to the costa. The structure of the male hypogium helps distinguish this species from the related and similar-looking S. convergens.

In life, the wings are bent over the end of the abdomen. This may cause the fly to be mistaken for a small beetle.

== Ecology ==
Adults are known to visit flowers of Alphitonia excelsa (Rhamnaceae) and Guioa semiglauca (Sapindaceae).

Larvae may live in rotting plant matter, like most lauxaniid larvae.

== Behaviour ==
Like various other flies, S. melanogaster exhibits bubbling behaviour: regurgitating a droplet of fluid, moving it in and out a few times, then swallowing it again. Evaporation of water from the droplet allows the fly to cool itself down and get rid of excess water.
