= Lauxaniidae =

- Tricholauxania praeusta - lateral view

Scientific classification
- Kingdom: Animalia
- Phylum: Arthropoda
- Clade: Pancrustacea
- Class: Insecta
- Order: Diptera
- Section: Schizophora
- Subsection: Acalyptratae
- Superfamily: Lauxanioidea
- Family: Lauxaniidae; Macquart, 1835

Subfamilies
- Eurychoromyiinae; Lauxaniinae; Homoneurinae

Synonyms
- Sapromyzidae

Family of flies

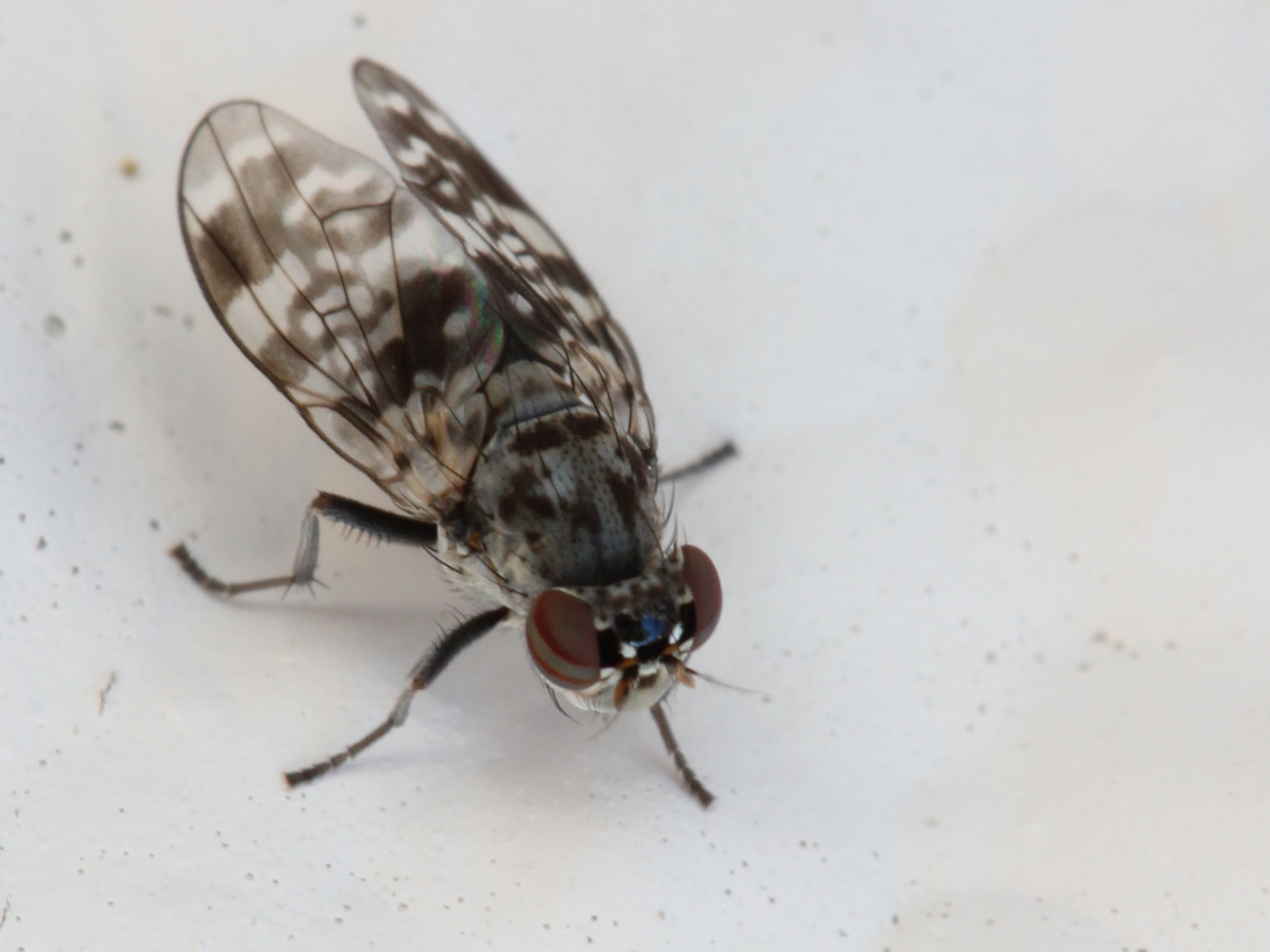
Cestrotus species, showing camouflage suited to lichens on rocks

The Lauxaniidae are a family of acalyptrate flies. They generally are small flies (length 7 mm or less) with large compound eyes that often are brightly coloured in life, sometimes with characteristic horizontal stripes, such as in Cestrotus species. Many species have variegated patterns on their wings, but in contrast they generally do not have variegated bodies, except for genera such as Cestrotus, whose camouflage mimics lichens or the texture of granitic rocks.

Some 1800 species of Lauxaniidae have been described and they comprise some 126 genera. The family has a cosmopolitan distribution, most of the species occurring in tropical regions of Asia and the Americas; relatively few species occur in Afrotropical regions, and Lauxaniid species diversity declines strongly towards the more temperate regions; for example fewer than 200 European species have been described. Most species inhabit forests, where the adults usually are found sitting on leaves of the understory. They are far less common in open country, such as grassland habitats.

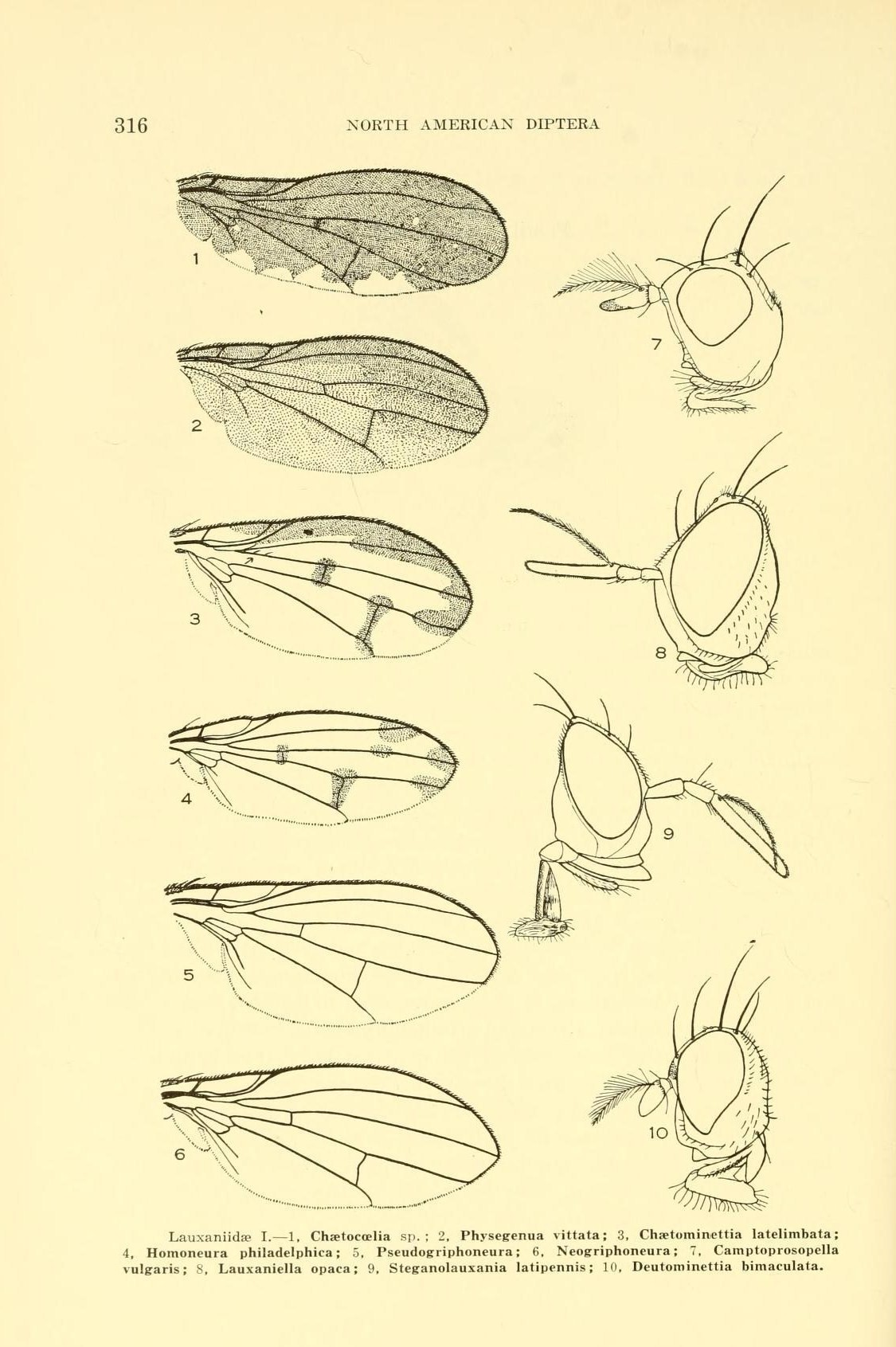
Morphological details of Lauxaniidae

== Description ==
For terms, see Morphology of Diptera
Lauxaniidae are small flies (2–7 mm in length). They are often rather plump, dull, or partly lustrous flies. The body colour varies from yellow to brown or black, or with a combination of these colours. The head varies in shape, with the face potentially projecting or retreating, and may be convex, flat, or concave, often lacking oral vibrissae (though sometimes poorly developed or occasionally featuring strong bristles near the vibrissal angle). The postvertical bristles converge, though in rare cases they may be parallel. The frons is broad, with two pairs of frontal bristles; the upper pair is always reclinate, while the lower pair may sometimes be decussate. Interfrontal bristles are absent. Ocellar bristles may be present or minute. The antennae vary, and the arista is plumose, ranging from pubescent to bare. The thorax features bristles, at least behind the suture, and the scutellum is usually bare except for marginal bristles. Propleural bristles may be present or absent, and one or two sternopleural bristles are observed. All tibiae have a preapical bristle. The wings may be marked or unmarked (with some species showing spots along the veins). Wing venation is complete, the costa is continuous, and the subcosta is entire, ending in the costa. The second basal and anal cells are short, and the apical cell is usually widely open. The abdomen is oval, though it may be elongated in rare cases.

== Biology ==
The larvae are mostly saprophagous, feeding in leaf litter, soil, bird nests, etc. Larvae of some mine fallen leaves, others live in rotten wood, and some cause deformation of the flowers and pistils of violets.

== Genera ==
- Afrominettia Stuckenberg, 1971
- Agriphoneura Hendel, 1925
- Allogriphoneura Hendel, 1926
- Allominettia Hendel, 1925
- Amblada Walker 1860
- Arnomyia Malloch, 1925
- Asilostoma Hendel, 1925
- Aulogastromyia Hendel, 1925
- Baliopteridion Papp & Silva, 1995
- Calliopum Strand, 1928
- Camptoprosopella Hendel, 1907
- Cestrotus Loew, 1862
- Choryeuromyia Gaimari & Silva, 2010
- Cnemacantha Macquart, 1835
- Deceia Malloch, 1923
- Deutominettia Hendel, 1925
- Elipolambda Gaimari & Silva, 2020
- Eurychoromyia Hendel, 1910
- Euryhendelimyia Gaimari & Silva, 2010
- Eurystratiomyia Gaimari & Silva, 2010
- Eusapromyza Malloch, 1923
- Exalla Gaimari, 2011
- Gauzania Walker, 1856
- Gibbolauxania Papp & Silva, 1995
- Griphoneura Schiner, 1868
- Griphoneuromima Gaimari & Silva, 2020
- Hirtodeceia Shewell, 1986
- Homoneura Wulp, 1891
- Lauxania Latreille, 1804
- Luzonomyza Malloch, 1925
- Mallochomyza Hendel, 1925
- Marmarodeceia Shewell, 1986
- Meiosimyza Hendel, 1925
- Melanomyza Malloch, 1923
- Meraina Gaimari & Silva, 2020
- Minettia Robineau-Desvoidy, 1830
- Minilauxania Papp & Silva, 1995
- Mycterella Kertész, 1912
- Myzaprosa Gaimari & Silva, 2020
- Neodeceia Malloch, 1924
- Neogeomyza Séguy, 1938
- Neogriphoneura Malloch, 1924
- Neoparoecus Özdikmen & Merz, 2006
- Oncodometopus Shewell, 1986
- Pachycerina Macquart, 1835
- Pachyopella Shewell, 1986
- Paracestrotus Hendel, 1925
- Paradeceia Gaimari & Silva, 2020
- Paranomina Hendel, 1907
- Parapachycerina Stuckenberg, 1971
- Peplominettia Szilády, 1943
- Peplomyza Haliday, 1837
- Physegeniopsis Gaimari & Silva, 2010
- Physegenua Macquart, 1848
- Physoclypeus Hendel, 1907
- Poecilohetaerella Tonnoir & Malloch, 1926
- Poecilolycia Shewell, 1986
- Poecilominettia Hendel, 1932
- Prosopomyia Loew, 1856
- Pseudocalliope Malloch, 1928
- Pseudodeceia Gaimari & Silva, 2020
- Pseudominettia Papp & Silva, 1995
- Roryeuchomyia Gaimari & Silva, 2010
- Sapromyza Fallén, 1810
- Sapromyzosoma Lioy, 1864
- Sciasminettia Shewell, 1986
- Sericominettia Gaimari & Silva, 2020
- Steganolauxania Frey, 1918
- Stenolauxania Malloch, 1926
- Tauridion Papp & Silva, 1995
- Tricholauxania Hendel, 1925
- Trigonometopus Macquart, 1835
- Trisapromyza Shewell, 1986
- Trivialia Malloch, 1923
- Trypetisoma Malloch, 1924
- Wawu Evenhuis 1989
- Xangelina Walker 1856
- Xeniconeura Shewell, 1986
- Xenochaetina Malloch, 1923
- Xenopterella Malloch, 1926
- Zamyprosa Gaimari & Silva, 2020
- Zargopsinettia Gaimari & Silva, 2020

== Gallery ==
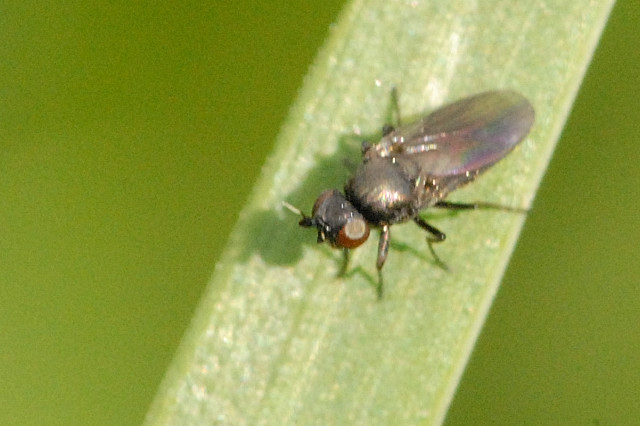
Calliopum simillimum

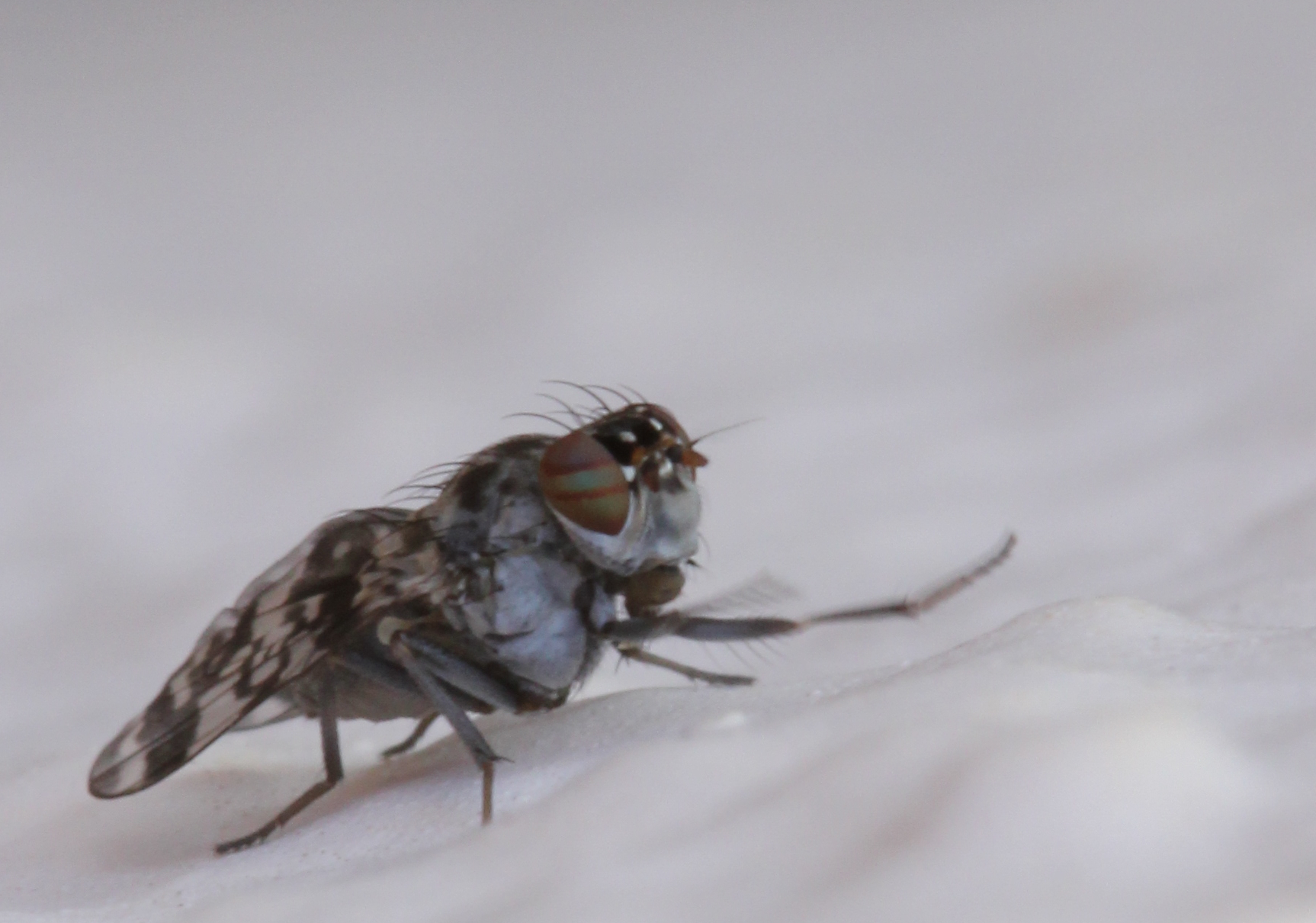
Cestrotus, eyes with horizontal stripes as in many Lauxaniidae

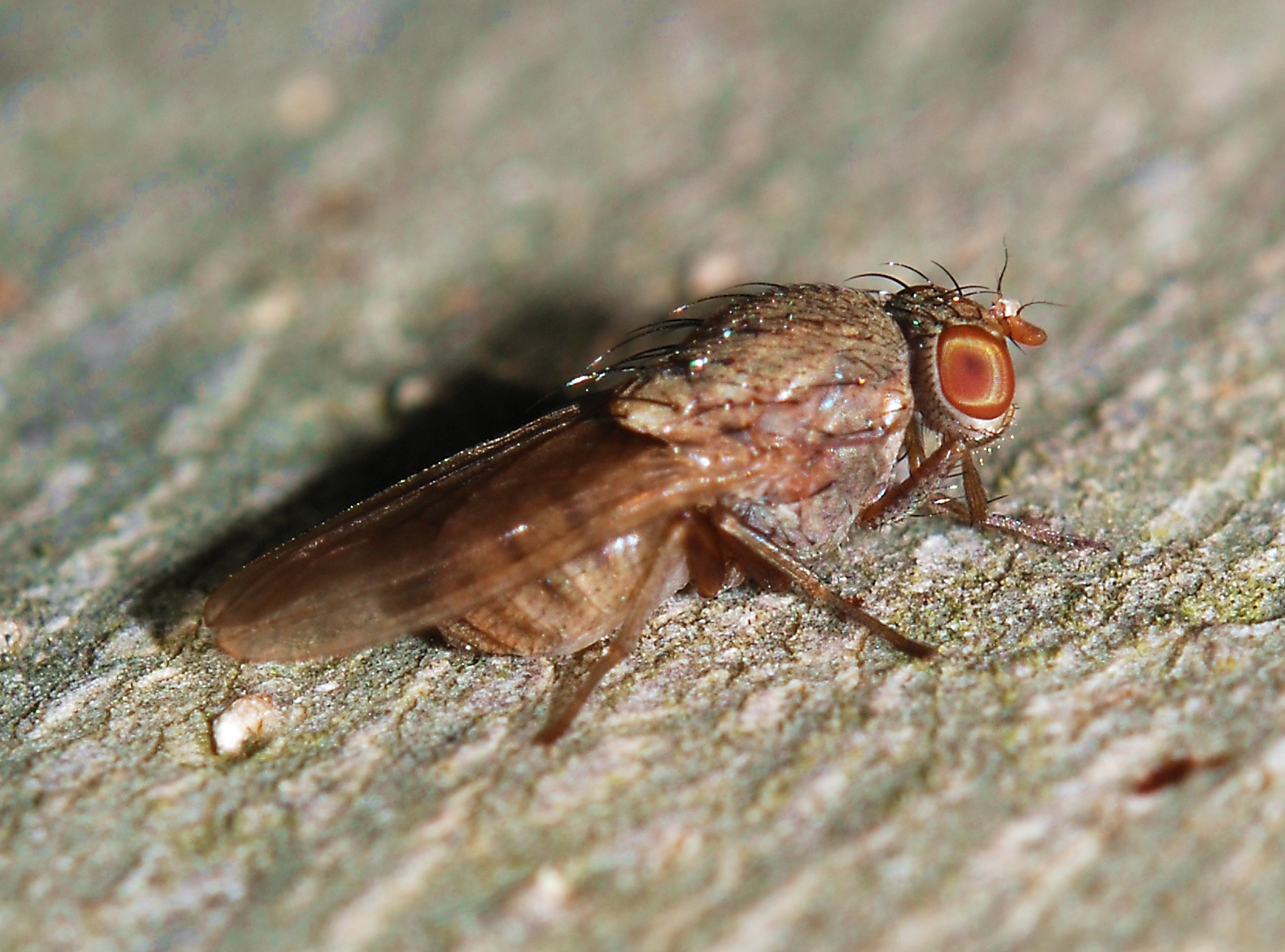
Minettia fasciata

Video: female of the Minettia fasciata group

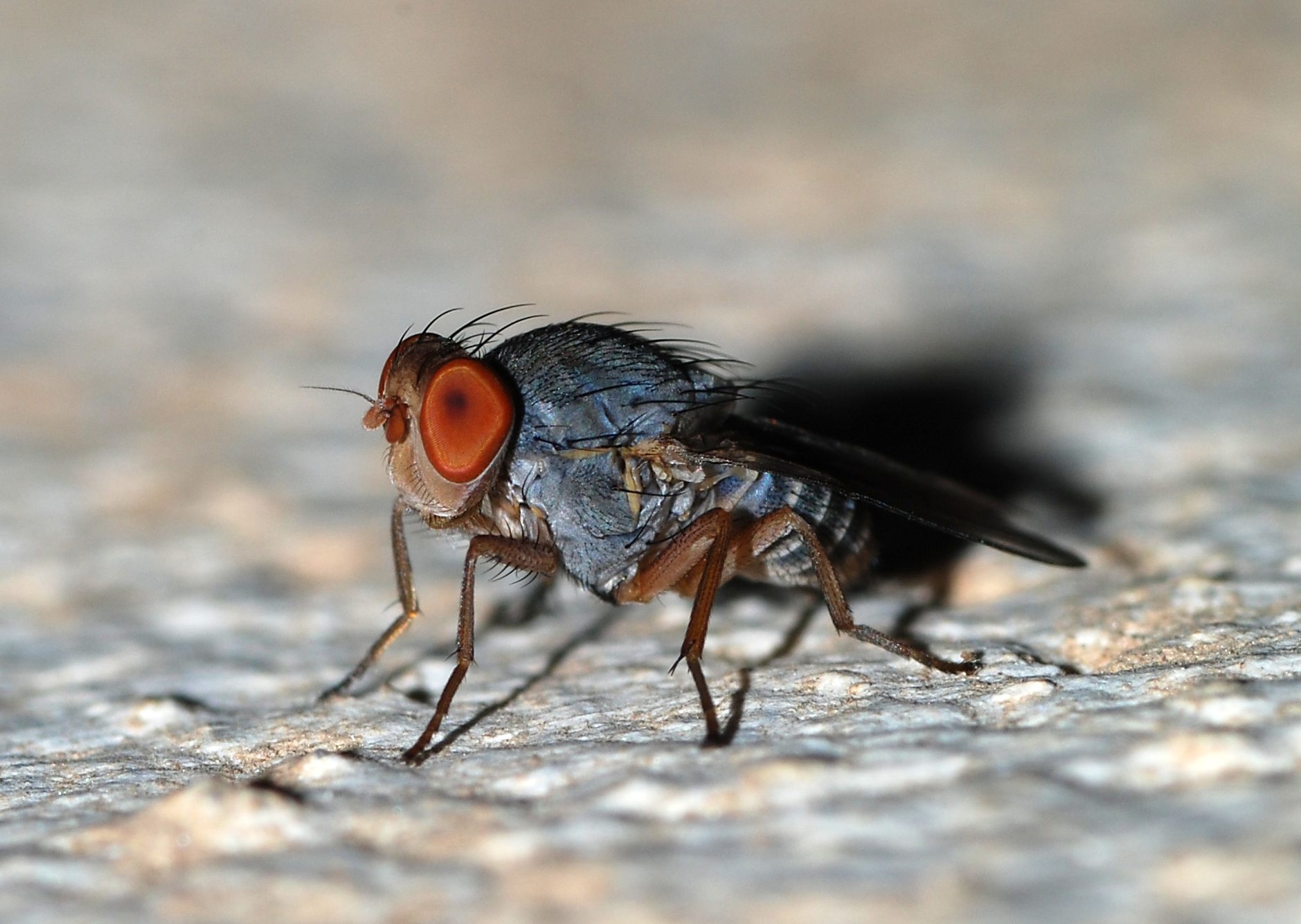
Prosopomyia pallida

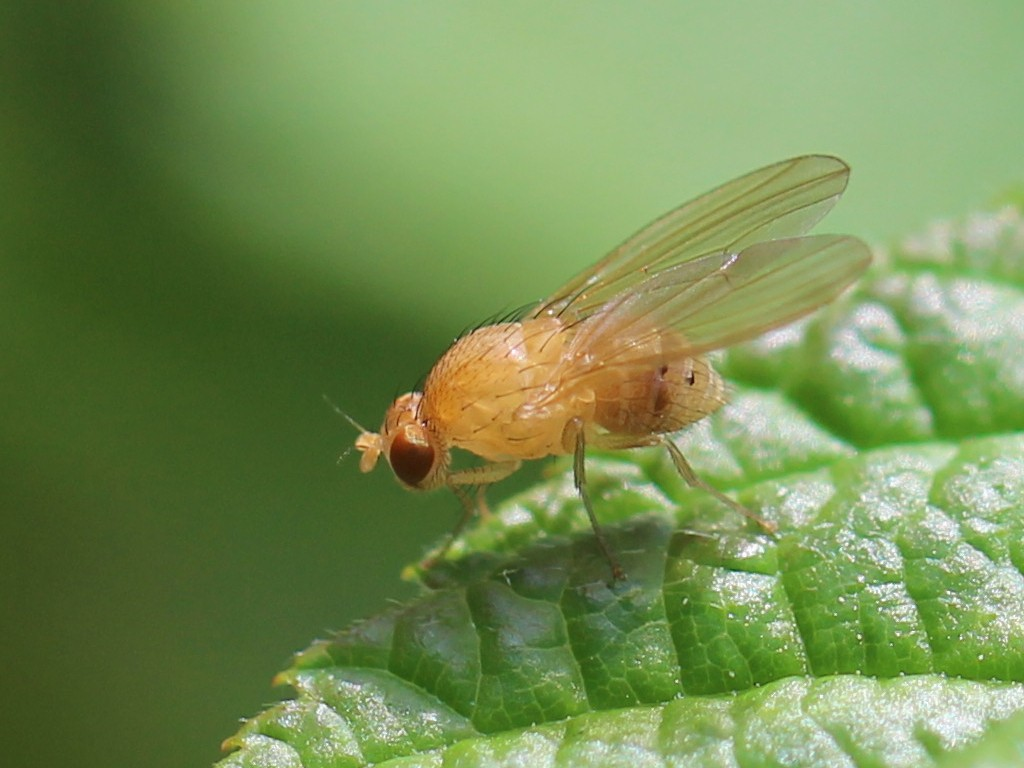
Sapromyza quadricincta male

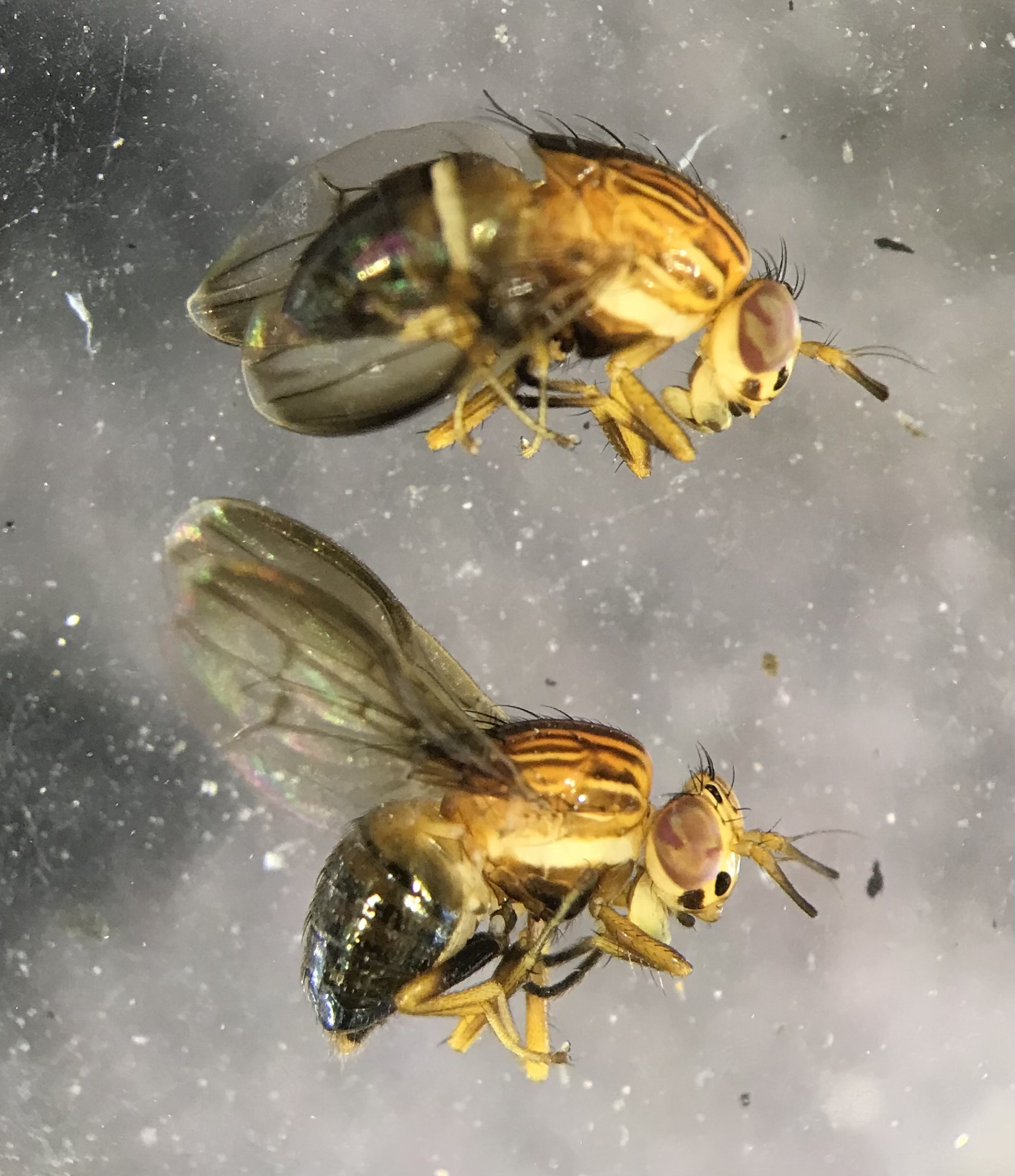
Steganopsis melanogaster

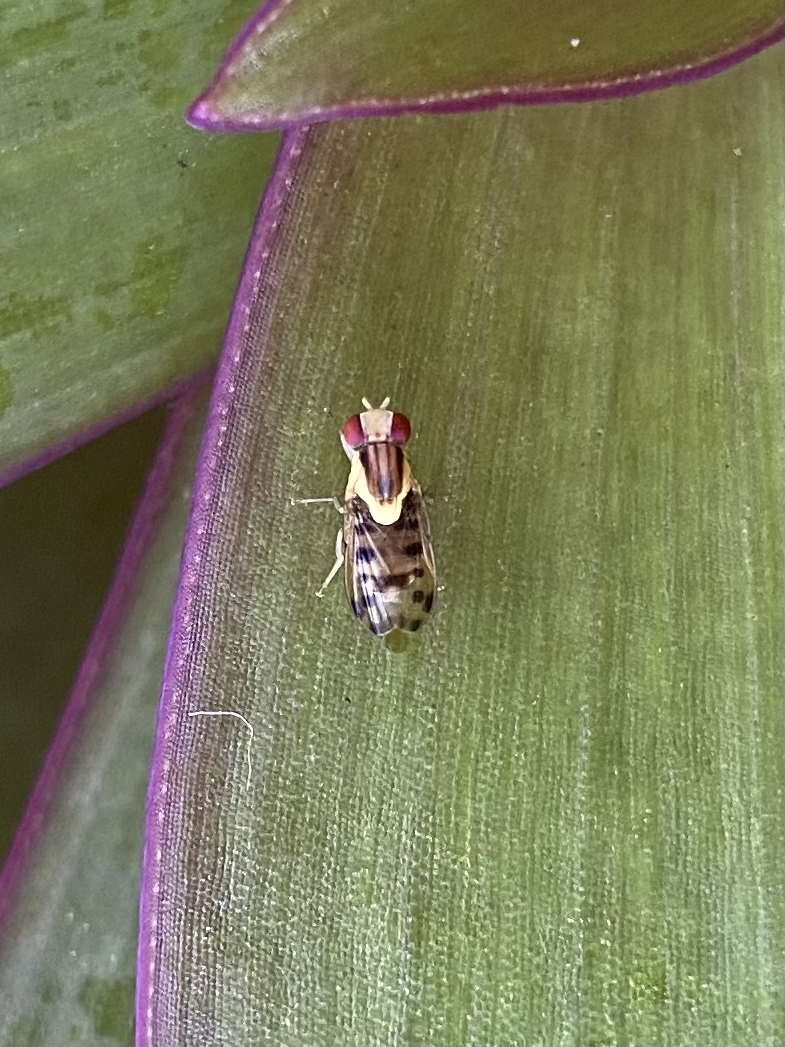
Wawu queenslandensis
