= List of Campsicnemus species =

These 297 species belong to Campsicnemus, a genus of long-legged flies in the family Dolichopodidae.

== Campsicnemus species ==
- Campsicnemus aa Evenhuis, 2009^{g}
- Campsicnemus acuticornis Parent, 1939^{i c g}
- Campsicnemus adachiae Evenhuis, 2015
- Campsicnemus aeptus Hardy & Kohn, 1964^{i c g}
- Campsicnemus alaskensis Harmston & Miller, 1966^{i c g}
- Campsicnemus albicomus Tenorio, 1969^{c g}
- Campsicnemus albilabris (Zetterstedt, 1859)
- Campsicnemus albitarsus Hardy & Kohn, 1964^{c g}
- Campsicnemus alexanderi Harmston & Miller, 1966^{i c g}
- Campsicnemus alpinus (Haliday, 1833)^{c g}
- Campsicnemus amana Evenhuis, 2003^{c g}
- Campsicnemus amblytylus Hardy & Kohn, 1964^{c g}
- Campsicnemus americanus Van Duzee, 1924^{i c g}
- Campsicnemus amini Olejníček, 1981^{c g}
- Campsicnemus anfractus Evenhuis, 2023
- Campsicnemus aniani Evenhuis, 2012^{g}
- Campsicnemus arcuatus Van Duzee, 1917^{i c g}
- Campsicnemus argyropterus Negrobov & Shamshev, 1985^{c g}
- Campsicnemus armatus (Zetterstedt, 1849)^{c g}
- Campsicnemus armoricanus Parent, 1926^{c g}
- Campsicnemus asterisk Evenhuis, 2003^{c g}
- Campsicnemus atlanticus Dyte, 1980^{c g}
- Campsicnemus aurilobus Tenorio, 1969^{c g}
- Campsicnemus azyx Evenhuis, 2013
- Campsicnemus bagachanovae Grichanov & Volfov, 2009
- Campsicnemus barbitibia Stackelberg, 1947^{c g}
- Campsicnemus bartletti Evenhuis, 2015
- Campsicnemus bellulus Van Duzee, 1933^{i c g}
- Campsicnemus bicirritus Tenorio, 1969^{c g}
- Campsicnemus bicoloripes Parent, 1937^{i c g}
- Campsicnemus bicrenatus Hardy & Kohn, 1964^{i c g}
- Campsicnemus biseta Hardy & Kohn, 1964^{i c g}
- Campsicnemus borabora Evenhuis, 2008^{c g}
- Campsicnemus breviciliatus Parent, 1939^{i c g}
- Campsicnemus brevipes Van Duzee, 1933^{i c g}
- Campsicnemus brevitibia Hardy & Kohn, 1964^{i c g}
- Campsicnemus brunnescens Hardy & Kohn, 1964^{i c g}
- Campsicnemus bryanti Malloch, 1932^{i c g}
- Campsicnemus bryophilus (Adachi, 1954)^{c g}
- Campsicnemus caffer Curran, 1926^{c g}
- Campsicnemus calcaratus Grimshaw, 1901^{c g}
- Campsicnemus calcaritarsus Adachi, 1953^{i c g}
- Campsicnemus camptoplax Hardy & Kohn, 1964^{i c g}
- Campsicnemus capellarii Grichanov, 2016
- Campsicnemus capitulatus Hardy & Kohn, 1964^{i c g}
- Campsicnemus carinatus Hardy & Kohn, 1964^{i c g}
- Campsicnemus charliechaplini Evenhuis, 1996^{c g}
- Campsicnemus chauliopodus Hardy & Kohn, 1964^{i c g}
- Campsicnemus cheesmanae Evenhuis, 2009^{g}
- Campsicnemus ciliatoides Evenhuis, 2012
- Campsicnemus ciliatus Van Duzee, 1933^{i c g}
- Campsicnemus cinctipus Harmston, 1968^{i c g}
- Campsicnemus claudicans Loew, 1864^{i c g}
- Campsicnemus clinotibia Hardy & Kohn, 1964^{i c g}
- Campsicnemus coloradensis Harmston & Miller, 1966^{i c g}
- Campsicnemus comatus Hardy & Kohn, 1964^{i c g}
- Campsicnemus compeditus Loew, 1857^{c g}
- Campsicnemus compressus Hardy & Kohn, 1964^{i c g}
- Campsicnemus conanti Evenhuis, 2024
- Campsicnemus congregatus Malloch, 1932^{i c g}
- Campsicnemus coniculus Hardy & Kohn, 1964^{c g}
- Campsicnemus contortus Parent, 1937^{c g}
- Campsicnemus cracens Hardy & Kohn, 1964^{i c g}
- Campsicnemus craigi Evenhuis, 2013
- Campsicnemus crassipes Hardy & Kohn, 1964^{i c g}
- Campsicnemus crinitarsis Strobl, 1906^{c g}
- Campsicnemus crinitibia Van Duzee, 1933^{i c g}
- Campsicnemus crispatus Tenorio, 1969^{c g}
- Campsicnemus crossotibia Hardy & Kohn, 1964^{i c g}
- Campsicnemus crossotus Hardy & Kohn, 1964^{i c g}
- Campsicnemus curvipes (Fallén, 1823)
- Campsicnemus curvispina Van Duzee, 1930^{i c g}
- Campsicnemus darvazicus Stackelberg, 1947^{c g}
- Campsicnemus dasycnemus Loew, 1857^{c g} (Note: This species is also known as Campsicnemus articulatellus (Zetterstedt, 1843).)
- Campsicnemus deficiens Parent, 1939^{i c g}
- Campsicnemus degener Wheeler, 1899^{i c g}
- Campsicnemus depauperatus Parent, 1939^{i c g}
- Campsicnemus diamphidius Hardy & Kohn, 1964^{i c g}
- Campsicnemus dicondylus Hardy & Kohn, 1964^{i c g}
- Campsicnemus diffusus Hardy & Kohn, 1964^{i c g}
- Campsicnemus digitatus Tenorio, 1969^{c g}
- Campsicnemus disjunctus Hardy & Kohn, 1964^{i c g}
- Campsicnemus distinctus Hardy & Kohn, 1964^{i c g}
- Campsicnemus distortipes Grimshaw, 1901^{i c g}
- Campsicnemus divergens Van Duzee, 1933^{i c g}
- Campsicnemus drymoscartes Hardy & Kohn, 1964^{i c g}
- Campsicnemus dytei Evenhuis, 2009^{g}
- Campsicnemus ee Evenhuis, 2009^{g}
- Campsicnemus elinae Evenhuis, 2013^{g}
- Campsicnemus elmoi Evenhuis, 2010
- Campsicnemus englundi Evenhuis, 2009^{g}
- Campsicnemus ephydrus Hardy & Kohn, 1964^{i c g}
- Campsicnemus exiguus Hardy & Kohn, 1964^{c g}
- Campsicnemus eximius Hardy & Kohn, 1964^{c g}
- Campsicnemus expansus Tenorio, 1969^{c g}
- Campsicnemus femoratus Ringdahl, 1949^{c g}
- Campsicnemus ferrugineus Parent, 1934^{i c g}
- Campsicnemus filipes Loew, 1859^{c g}
- Campsicnemus fimbriatus Grimshaw, 1902^{i c g}
- Campsicnemus finitimus Tenorio, 1969^{c g}
- Campsicnemus flavipes Hardy & Kohn, 1964^{i c g}
- Campsicnemus flavissimus Grichanov, 2012
- Campsicnemus flexuosus Parent, 1939^{c g}
- Campsicnemus fragilis Parent, 1939^{i c g}
- Campsicnemus fulvifacies Hardy & Kohn, 1964^{i c g}
- Campsicnemus fumipennis Parent, 1937^{i c g}
- Campsicnemus fusticulus Hardy & Kohn, 1964^{i c g}
- Campsicnemus gladiator Evenhuis, 2009^{g}
- Campsicnemus gloriamontis Evenhuis, 2000^{c g}
- Campsicnemus gloriosus Van Duzee, 1933^{i c g}
- Campsicnemus goniochaeta Hardy & Kohn, 1964^{i c g}
- Campsicnemus grimshawi Van Duzee, 1933^{i c g}
- Campsicnemus haleakalaae (Zimmerman, 1938)^{i c g}
- Campsicnemus halonae Evenhuis, 1996^{c g}
- Campsicnemus hao Evenhuis, 2018
- Campsicnemus hardyi Tenorio, 1969^{c g}
- Campsicnemus hawaiiensis Hardy & Delfinado, 1974^{c g}
- Campsicnemus helvolus Hardy & Kohn, 1964^{i c g}
- Campsicnemus hihiroa Evenhuis, 2009^{g}
- Campsicnemus hirtipes Loew, 1861^{i c g b}
- Campsicnemus hispidipes Hardy & Kohn, 1964^{i c g}
- Campsicnemus hiwi Evenhuis, 2015
- Campsicnemus hoplitipodus Adachi, 1953^{i c g}
- Campsicnemus hygrophilus Hardy & Kohn, 1964^{i c g}
- Campsicnemus ii Evenhuis, 2009^{g}
- Campsicnemus iii Evenhuis, 2011
- Campsicnemus impariseta Hardy & Kohn, 1964^{i c g}
- Campsicnemus inaequalis Hardy & Kohn, 1964^{i c g}
- Campsicnemus indecorus Hardy & Kohn, 1964^{i c g}
- Campsicnemus inermipes Malloch, 1932^{i c g}
- Campsicnemus insuetus Hardy & Kohn, 1964^{i c g}
- Campsicnemus invaginatus Tenorio, 1969^{c g}
- Campsicnemus issykkulensis Selivanova, Negrobov & Grichanov, 2012
- Campsicnemus kaluanui Evenhuis, 2012
- Campsicnemus kariae Evenhuis, 2013
- Campsicnemus keokeo Evenhuis, 2003^{c g}
- Campsicnemus kohala Evenhuis, 2013
- Campsicnemus kokokekuku Evenhuis, 2007^{c g}
- Campsicnemus kolekole Evenhuis, 2015
- Campsicnemus konahema Evenhuis, 2016
- Campsicnemus konstantini Grichanov, 2011
- Campsicnemus kuku Evenhuis, 2003^{c g}
- Campsicnemus kumukumu Evenhuis, 2015
- Campsicnemus labilis Hardy & Kohn, 1964^{i c g}
- Campsicnemus lantsovi Grichanov, 1998^{c g}
- Campsicnemus latipenna Hardy & Kohn, 1964^{i c g}
- Campsicnemus lawakua Evenhuis, 2003^{c g}
- Campsicnemus lepidochaites Hardy & Kohn, 1964^{i c g}
- Campsicnemus leucostoma Evenhuis, 2012^{g}
- Campsicnemus limnobates Evenhuis, 2000^{c g}
- Campsicnemus lineatus Negrobov & Zlobin, 1978^{c g}
- Campsicnemus lipothrix Evenhuis, 2003^{c g}
- Campsicnemus lobatus Evenhuis, 2008^{c g}
- Campsicnemus longiciliatus Parent, 1939^{i c g}
- Campsicnemus longipilosus (Tang, Wang & Yang, 2015)
- Campsicnemus longiquus Tenorio, 1969^{c g}
- Campsicnemus longitarsus Evenhuis, 2003^{c g}
- Campsicnemus longitibia Hardy & Kohn, 1964^{i c g}
- Campsicnemus loripes (Haliday, 1832)^{c g}
- Campsicnemus loxothrix Hardy & Kohn, 1964^{i c g}
- Campsicnemus lumbatus Loew, 1857^{c g}
- Campsicnemus macula Parent, 1939^{i c g}
- Campsicnemus maculatus Becker, 1918^{c g}
- Campsicnemus magius (Loew, 1845)^{c g}
- Campsicnemus makua Evenhuis, 2003^{c g}
- Campsicnemus mamillatus Mik, 1869^{c g}
- Campsicnemus mammiculatus Parent, 1927^{c g}
- Campsicnemus manaka Evenhuis, 2003^{c g}
- Campsicnemus marginatus Loew, 1857^{c g}
- Campsicnemus marilynae Evenhuis, 2013
- Campsicnemus maui Evenhuis, 2007^{c g}
- Campsicnemus maukele Evenhuis, 2007^{c g}
- Campsicnemus mediofloccus Hardy & Kohn, 1964^{i c g}
- Campsicnemus melanus Harmston & Knowlton, 1942^{i c g}
- Campsicnemus membranilobus Parent, 1939^{i c g}
- Campsicnemus meridionalis Grichanov, 2012
- Campsicnemus meyeri Evenhuis, 2013
- Campsicnemus milleri Harmston, 1966^{i c g}
- †Campsicnemus mirabilis (Grimshaw, 1902)^{i c g}
- Campsicnemus miritibialis Van Duzee, 1933^{i c g}
- Campsicnemus miser Parent, 1939^{i c g}
- Campsicnemus modicus Hardy & Kohn, 1964^{i c g}
- Campsicnemus montanus Harmston & Knowlton, 1942^{i c g}
- Campsicnemus montgomeryi (Evenhuis, 1997)^{c g}
- Campsicnemus moorea Evenhuis, 2013
- Campsicnemus mucronatus Hardy & Kohn, 1964^{i c g}
- Campsicnemus mundulus Hardy & Kohn, 1964^{c g}
- Campsicnemus mylloseta Evenhuis, 2008^{c g}
- Campsicnemus nambai Hardy & Kohn, 1964^{i c g}
- Campsicnemus neoplatystylatus Evenhuis, 2003^{c g}
- Campsicnemus nigricollis Van Duzee, 1933^{i c g}
- Campsicnemus nigripes Van Duzee, 1917^{i c g}
- Campsicnemus nigroanalis Parent, 1939^{i c g}
- Campsicnemus niveisoma Evenhuis, 2012
- Campsicnemus norops Hardy & Kohn, 1964^{i c g}
- Campsicnemus obscurus Parent, 1937^{i c g}
- Campsicnemus oedipus Wheeler, 1899^{i c g}
- Campsicnemus ogradyi Evenhuis, 2008^{c g}
- Campsicnemus olympicola Parent, 1939^{c g}
- Campsicnemus oo Evenhuis, 2009^{g}
- Campsicnemus oregonensis Harmston & Miller, 1966^{i c g}
- Campsicnemus ornatus Van Duzee, 1933^{i c g}
- Campsicnemus ostlinx Evenhuis, 2008^{c g}
- Campsicnemus pallidoapicalis Wang, Przhiboro & Yang in Wang, Liu, Przhiboro & Yang, 2016
- Campsicnemus pallidus Parent, 1939^{i c g}
- Campsicnemus paniculatus Hardy & Kohn, 1964^{i c g}
- Campsicnemus panini Evenhuis, 2003^{c g}
- Campsicnemus paradoxus (Wahlberg, 1844)^{c g}
- Campsicnemus paralobatus Evenhuis, 2008^{c g}
- Campsicnemus parvulus Hardy & Kohn, 1964^{i c g}
- Campsicnemus patellifer Grimshaw, 1902^{i c g}
- Campsicnemus pe Evenhuis, 2003^{c g}
- Campsicnemus pectinatus Evenhuis, 2013
- Campsicnemus penicillatoides Evenhuis, 2003^{c g}
- Campsicnemus penicillatus Parent, 1934^{i c g}
- Campsicnemus perkinsi Evenhuis, 2011
- Campsicnemus perplexus Hardy & Kohn, 1964^{i c g}
- Campsicnemus petalicnemus Hardy & Kohn, 1964^{i c g}
- Campsicnemus pherocteis Hardy & Kohn, 1964^{i c g}
- Campsicnemus philoctetes Wheeler, 1899^{i c g}
- Campsicnemus philohydratus Hardy & Kohn, 1964^{i c g}
- Campsicnemus picticornis (Zetterstedt, 1843)^{c g}
- Campsicnemus pilitarsis Negrobov & Zlobin, 1978^{c g}
- Campsicnemus pilosellus (Zetterstedt, 1843)
- Campsicnemus planitibia Parent, 1939^{i c g}
- Campsicnemus platystylatus Hardy & Kohn, 1964^{i c g}
- Campsicnemus plautinus Adachi, 1953^{i c g}
- Campsicnemus plautus Evenhuis, 2009^{g}
- Campsicnemus poho Evenhuis, 2015
- Campsicnemus polhemusi Evenhuis, 2003^{c g}
- Campsicnemus popeye Evenhuis, 2013
- Campsicnemus prestoni Evenhuis, 2007
- Campsicnemus profusus Hardy & Kohn, 1964^{c g}
- Campsicnemus puali Evenhuis, 2003^{c g}
- Campsicnemus pulumi Evenhuis, 2019
- Campsicnemus pumilio (Zetterstedt, 1843)^{c g}
- Campsicnemus pusillus (Meigen, 1824)^{c g}
- Campsicnemus putillus Parent, 1937^{i c g}
- Campsicnemus puuoumi Evenhuis, 2013
- Campsicnemus pycnochaeta Hardy & Kohn, 1964^{i c g}
- Campsicnemus quasimodicus Evenhuis, 2011
- Campsicnemus rectus Malloch, 1932^{i c g}
- Campsicnemus restrictus Hardy & Kohn, 1964^{i c g}
- Campsicnemus rheocrenus Evenhuis, 2008^{c g}
- Campsicnemus rhyphopus Hardy & Kohn, 1964^{i c g}
- Campsicnemus ridiculoides Evenhuis, 2016
- Campsicnemus ridiculus Parent, 1937^{i c g}
- Campsicnemus sanctaehelenae Grichanov, 2012
- Campsicnemus scambus (Fallén, 1823)
- Campsicnemus sciarus Hardy & Kohn, 1964^{i c g}
- Campsicnemus scolimerus Hardy & Kohn, 1964^{i c g}
- Campsicnemus scurra Parent, 1934^{c g}
- Campsicnemus setiger Hardy & Kohn, 1964^{i c g}
- Campsicnemus silvaticus Hardy & Kohn, 1964^{i c g}
- Campsicnemus simplicipes Parent, 1937^{c g}
- Campsicnemus simplicissimus Strobl, 1906^{c g}
- Campsicnemus sinuatus Van Duzee, 1933^{i c g}
- Campsicnemus sinuosus Evenhuis, 2007^{c g}
- Campsicnemus spectabulus Evenhuis, 2012^{g}
- Campsicnemus spinicoxa Hardy & Kohn, 1964^{i c g}
- Campsicnemus spuh Evenhuis, 2003^{c g}
- Campsicnemus tahaanus Evenhuis, 2008^{c g}
- Campsicnemus taratara Evenhuis, 2009^{g}
- Campsicnemus tarsiciliatus Parent, 1939^{i c g}
- Campsicnemus terracolus Hardy & Kohn, 1964^{c g}
- Campsicnemus thersites Wheeler, 1899^{i c g}
- Campsicnemus tibialis Van Duzee, 1933^{i c g}
- Campsicnemus tomkovichi Grichanov, 2009
- Campsicnemus truncatus Hardy & Kohn, 1964^{i c g}
- Campsicnemus tunoa Evenhuis, 2008^{c g}
- Campsicnemus uha Evenhuis, 2003^{c g}
- Campsicnemus ui Evenhuis, 2007^{c g}
- Campsicnemus umbripennis Loew, 1856^{c g}
- Campsicnemus uncatus Tenorio, 1969^{c g}
- Campsicnemus uncleremus Evenhuis, 2000^{c g}
- Campsicnemus undulatus Hardy & Kohn, 1964^{i c g}
- Campsicnemus unipunctatus Negrobov & Zlobin, 1978^{c g}
- Campsicnemus unu Evenhuis, 2003^{c g}
- Campsicnemus utahensis Harmston & Knowlton, 1942^{i c g}
- Campsicnemus uttarakhandicus Grichanov, 2016
- Campsicnemus uu Evenhuis, 2009^{g}
- Campsicnemus vafellus Parent, 1939^{i c g}
- Campsicnemus vanduzeei Curran, 1933^{i c g}
- Campsicnemus varipes Loew, 1859^{c g}
- Campsicnemus versicolorus Negrobov & Zlobin, 1978^{c g}
- Campsicnemus viridulus Hardy & Kohn, 1964^{i c g}
- Campsicnemus vtorovi Negrobov & Zlobin, 1978^{c g}
- Campsicnemus waialealeensis Evenhuis, 2003^{c g}
- Campsicnemus wheeleri Van Duzee, 1923^{i c g}
- Campsicnemus wilderae Runyon, 2008^{c g}
- Campsicnemus williamsi Van Duzee, 1933^{i c g}
- Campsicnemus yangi Grichanov, 1998^{c g}
- Campsicnemus yunnanensis Yang & Saigusa, 2001^{c g}
- Campsicnemus zigzag Evenhuis, 2008^{c g}
- Campsicnemus zimmermani (Evenhuis, 1997)^{c g}
- Campsicnemus zlobini Grichanov, 2012
- Campsicnemus zoeae Evenhuis, 2015

Unrecognised species:

- Campsicnemus cupreus (Macquart, 1839)

Species regarded as Dolichopodidae incertae sedis:

- Campsicnemus halidayi Dyte, 1975^{c g}
- Campsicnemus lucidus Becker, 1924^{c g}

Species considered nomina nuda:

- Campsicnemus limosus Vaillant, 1978

Synonyms:

- Campsicnemus armeniacus Negrobov, Manko, Hrivniak & Obona, 2017: synonym of Campsicnemus varipes Loew, 1859
- Campsicnemus bennetti Evenhuis, 2011: synonym of Campsicnemus labilis Hardy & Kohn, 1964
- Campsicnemus flaviantenna (Tang, Wang & Yang, 2015): synonym of Campsicnemus picticornis (Zetterstedt, 1843)
- Campsicnemus furax Parent, 1939^{i c g}: synonym of Campsicnemus ornatus Van Duzee, 1933
- Campsicnemus makawao Evenhuis, 2011: synonym of Campsicnemus camptoplax Hardy & Kohn, 1964
- Campsicnemus scintillatus Evenhuis, 2012: synonym of Campsicnemus ornatus Van Duzee, 1933
- Campsicnemus uniseta Hardy & Kohn, 1964^{i c g}: synonym of Campsicnemus albitarsus Hardy & Kohn, 1964

Species transferred to other genera:

- Campsicnemus rufinus Frey, 1925^{c g}: transferred to Hercostomoides
- †Campsicnemus gracilis Meunier, 1907: transferred to Prohercostomus

Data sources: i = ITIS, c = Catalogue of Life, g = GBIF, b = Bugguide.net
