= Elmoia =

Scientific classification
- Kingdom: Animalia
- Phylum: Arthropoda
- Clade: Pancrustacea
- Class: Insecta
- Order: Diptera
- Family: Dolichopodidae
- Subfamily: incertae sedis
- Genus: Elmoia; Evenhuis, 2005

Type species
- Chrysotus saxatilis Grimshaw, 1901

Genus of flies

Elmoia is a genus of flies in the family Dolichopodidae, endemic to Hawaii. It is part of the Eurynogaster complex of genera. The genus is named in honor of D. Elmo Hardy.

== Species ==
- Elmoia bullata (Hardy & Kohn, 1964)
- Elmoia exartema (Hardy & Kohn, 1964)
- Elmoia hamata (Hardy & Kohn, 1964)
- Elmoia lanceolata (Tenorio, 1969)
- Elmoia multispinosa (Hardy & Kohn, 1964)
- Elmoia nigrohalterata (Parent, 1939)
- Elmoia saxatilis (Grimshaw, 1901)
- Elmoia viridifacies (Parent, 1938)
