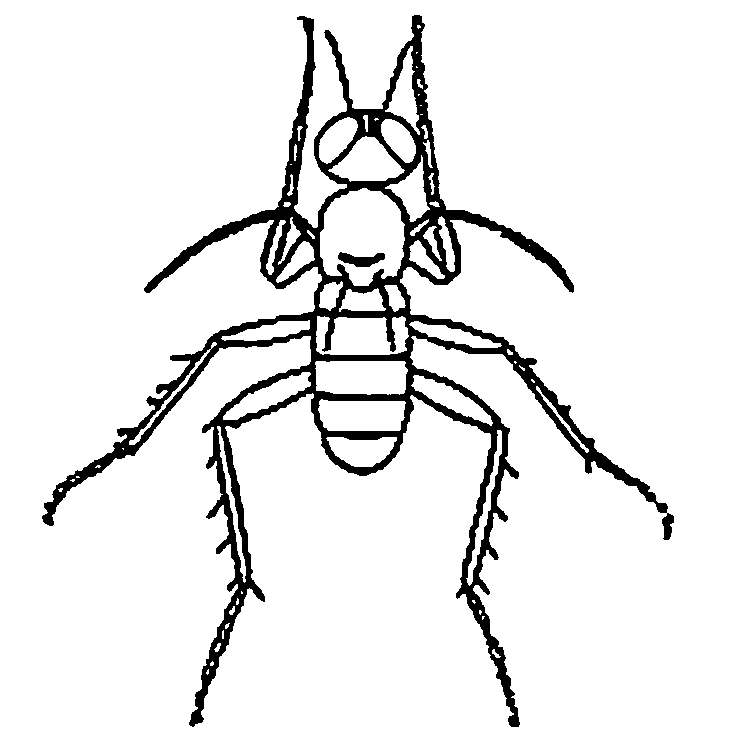

Conservation status
- Extinct (IUCN 2.3)

Scientific classification
- Kingdom: Animalia
- Phylum: Arthropoda
- Class: Insecta
- Order: Diptera
- Family: Dolichopodidae
- Genus: Campsicnemus
- Species: †C. mirabilis

Binomial name
- †Campsicnemus mirabilis (Grimshaw, 1902)

Synonyms
- Emperoptera mirabilis Grimshaw, 1902

= Campsicnemus mirabilis =

Extinct species of fly

Campsicnemus mirabilis (formerly Emperoptera mirabilis) is an extinct species of fly in family Dolichopodidae. It was endemic to the Hawaiian Islands.

It is one of a number of unusual flightless flies native to the islands. It is not known to be arboreal; most specimens have been found in leaf litter.

It is believed that this species, and other species from the same genus, may well be extinct. They were described as being locally abundant when collected in 1907 on Tantalus Peak, but not found in the 1980s. One reason for their demise is believed to be due to introduced predatory ants of the genus Pheidole, but other factors, including loss of habitat, may also be involved.

The species was originally described and placed in the genus Emperoptera by Percy H. Grimshaw in 1902. It was moved to the genus Campsicnemus by Hardy & Kohn in 1964. However, in 1997, Neal Evenhuis reinstated it to the genus Emperoptera. In 2010, Evenhuis moved the species back to the genus Campsicnemus, after having shown evidence to support the synonymy of Emperoptera with Campsicnemus.
