= Eurynogaster =

Scientific classification
- Kingdom: Animalia
- Phylum: Arthropoda
- Class: Insecta
- Order: Diptera
- Family: Dolichopodidae
- Subfamily: incertae sedis
- Genus: Eurynogaster; Van Duzee, 1933

Type species
- Eurynogaster clavaticauda Van Duzee, 1933

Genus of flies

Eurynogaster is a genus of flies in the family Dolichopodidae, endemic to Hawaii. It is part of the Eurynogaster complex of genera, which also includes the genera Adachia, Arciellia, Elmoia, Major, Sigmatineurum, Sweziella and Uropachys.

== Species ==
- Eurynogaster ablusispina Tenorio, 1969
- Eurynogaster angusticerca Tenorio, 1969
- Eurynogaster angustifacies Hardy & Kohn, 1964
- Eurynogaster argentata Hardy & Kohn, 1964
- Eurynogaster callaina Hardy & Kohn, 1964
- Eurynogaster cilifemorata Parent, 1939
- Eurynogaster clavaticauda Van Duzee, 1933
- Eurynogaster concava Tenorio, 1969
- Eurynogaster furva Hardy & Kohn, 1964
- Eurynogaster hawaiiensis (Grimshaw, 1901)
- Eurynogaster incompta Hardy & Kohn, 1964
- Eurynogaster kauaiensis Hardy & Kohn, 1964
- Eurynogaster maculata Parent, 1939
- Eurynogaster mediocris Tenorio, 1969
- Eurynogaster obscura Tenorio, 1969
- Eurynogaster paludis Hardy & Kohn, 1964
- Eurynogaster pulverea Hardy & Kohn, 1964
- Eurynogaster retrociliata Parent, 1939
- Eurynogaster spinigera (Grimshaw, 1901)
- Eurynogaster subciliata Hardy & Kohn, 1964
- Eurynogaster tanyceraea Hardy & Kohn, 1964
- Eurynogaster undulata Tenorio, 1969
- Eurynogaster variabilis Hardy & Kohn, 1964
- Eurynogaster vittata Hardy & Kohn, 1964
