= Glabellula crassicornis =

Scientific classification
- Domain: Eukaryota
- Kingdom: Animalia
- Phylum: Arthropoda
- Class: Insecta
- Order: Diptera
- Family: Mythicomyiidae
- Genus: Glabellula
- Species: G. crassicornis

Binomial name
- Glabellula crassicornis (Greene, 1924)

Synonyms
- Pachyneres crassicornis Greene, 1924

Species of fly

Glabellula crassicornis is a species of micro bee flies in the family Mythicomyiidae.
