= Oocelyphus =

Scientific classification
- Kingdom: Animalia
- Phylum: Arthropoda
- Class: Insecta
- Order: Diptera
- Subsection: Acalyptratae
- Superfamily: Lauxanioidea
- Family: Celyphidae
- Genus: Oocelyphus; Chen, 1949

Type species
- Oocelyphus tarsalis Chen, 1949

Genus of flies

Oocelyphus is a genus of beetle flies. It is known from the Oriental realm.

== Species ==
- O. coniferis Shi, 1998
- O. nigritus Shi, 1998
- O. tarsalis Chen, 1949
- O. uncatis Shi, 1998
