= Arciellia =

Scientific classification
- Kingdom: Animalia
- Phylum: Arthropoda
- Class: Insecta
- Order: Diptera
- Family: Dolichopodidae
- Subfamily: incertae sedis
- Genus: Arciellia; Evenhuis, 2005

Type species
- Eurynogaster dolichostoma Hardy & Kohn, 1964

Genus of flies

Arciellia is a genus of flies in the family Dolichopodidae, endemic to Hawaii. It is part of the Eurynogaster complex of genera. The genus is named in honor of Robert Cyril Layton Perkins, and incorporates the phonetic sounds of his initials "R.C.L.".

== Species ==
- Arciellia dolichostoma (Hardy & Kohn, 1964)
- Arciellia flaviventer (Hardy & Kohn, 1964)
- Arciellia xanthopleura (Hardy & Kohn, 1964)
