= Chamaecelyphus =

Scientific classification
- Kingdom: Animalia
- Phylum: Arthropoda
- Class: Insecta
- Order: Diptera
- Subsection: Acalyptratae
- Superfamily: Lauxanioidea
- Family: Celyphidae
- Genus: Chamaecelyphus; Frey, 1941

Type species
- Chamaecelyphus halticinus Frey, 1941

Genus of flies

Chamaecelyphus is a genus of Celyphidae.

== Species ==
- C. africanus (Walker, 1849)
- C. dichrous (Bezzi, 1908)
- C. halticinus Frey, 1941
- C. kalongensis Vanschuytbroeck, 1963
- C. ruwenzoriensis Vanschuytbroeck, 1963
- C. straeleni Vanschuytbroeck, 1959
- C. upembaensis Vanschuytbroeck, 1952
- C. violaceus Vanschuytbroeck, 1959
- C. vrydaghi Vanschuytbroeck, 1959
