= Uropachys =

Scientific classification
- Kingdom: Animalia
- Phylum: Arthropoda
- Class: Insecta
- Order: Diptera
- Family: Dolichopodidae
- Subfamily: incertae sedis
- Genus: Uropachys; Parent, 1935

Type species
- Pachyurus hawaiensis Parent, 1934

Synonyms
- Pachyurus Parent, 1934 (nec Agassiz, 1831); Uropacys (incorrect spelling)

Genus of flies

Uropachys is a genus of flies in the family Dolichopodidae, endemic to Kauai of the Hawaiian Islands. It is part of the Eurynogaster complex of genera.

== Species ==
Included species:

- Uropachys clavastylus (Hardy & Kohn, 1964)
- Uropachys crassicercus (Hardy & Kohn, 1964)
- Uropachys flavicrurus (Hardy & Kohn, 1964)
- Uropachys fleacercus Evenhuis, 2019
- Uropachys fusticercus (Hardy & Kohn, 1964)
- Uropachys hawaiensis (Parent, 1934)
- Uropachys mediacercus Evenhuis, 2019
- Uropachys palustricola (Hardy & Kohn, 1964)
- Uropachys politicocercus Evenhuis, 2019

Species moved to Eurynogaster:

- Uropachys pulverea (Hardy & Kohn, 1964)
