= Cyrtosia =

Cyrtosia is the scientific name of two genera of organisms and may refer to:

- Cyrtosia (fly), a genus of insects in the family Mythicomyiidae
- Cyrtosia (plant), a genus of plants in the family Orchidaceae
- Cyrtosia (Packard, 1864), a synonym for Packardia, a genus of moths in the family Limacodidae
