= Adachia =

Scientific classification
- Kingdom: Animalia
- Phylum: Arthropoda
- Class: Insecta
- Order: Diptera
- Family: Dolichopodidae
- Subfamily: incertae sedis
- Genus: Adachia; Evenhuis, 2005

Type species
- Eurynogaster apicenigra Parent, 1939

Genus of flies

Adachia is a genus of flies in the family Dolichopodidae, endemic to Hawaii. It is part of the Eurynogaster complex of genera. The genus is named in honor of Marian Kohn (née Adachi) for her work on Hawaiian dolichopodids.

== Species ==
- Adachia apicenigra (Parent, 1939)
- Adachia hispida (Hardy & Kohn, 1964)
- Adachia nigripedis (Hardy & Kohn, 1964)
- Adachia nudata (Hardy & Kohn, 1964)
- Adachia obscurifacies (Parent, 1939)
- Adachia williamsi (Hardy & Kohn, 1964)
