= Sceloenopla balyi =

Scientific classification
- Kingdom: Animalia
- Phylum: Arthropoda
- Class: Insecta
- Order: Coleoptera
- Suborder: Polyphaga
- Infraorder: Cucujiformia
- Family: Chrysomelidae
- Genus: Sceloenopla
- Species: S. balyi

Binomial name
- Sceloenopla balyi (Grimshaw, 1897)

Synonyms
- Cephalodonta maculata Baly, 1885 (not Olivier, 1792); Cephalodonta balyi Grimshaw, 1897 (replacement name)

Species of beetle

Sceloenopla balyi is a species of beetle of the family Chrysomelidae. It is found in Guatemala.

== Description ==
The vertex is smooth and impunctate, the front finely punctured, impressed with an oblong fovea, and armed between the insertion of the antennae with a minute tooth. The antennae are scarcely half the length of the body, robust and filiform. The thorax is conic, the sides obliquely converging from the base to the apex, obsoletely and irregularly crenulate, the apical angle produced anteriorly into a strong flattened subacute tooth, transversely convex, flattened and longitudinally excavated on the sides in front, closely covered with irregular foveolate punctures. The elytra are much broader than the thorax, the sides dilated posteriorly, the apex obtusely rounded and the posterior angle acute. The upper surface is slightly convex on the sides and apex, flattened on the disc. The humeral callus is laterally produced and subacute. Each elytron has ten, at the extreme base eleven, rows of large deep punctures, the second interspace rather strongly, the fourth, sixth, and eighth less distinctly, costate.

== Life history ==
No host plant has been documented for this species.
