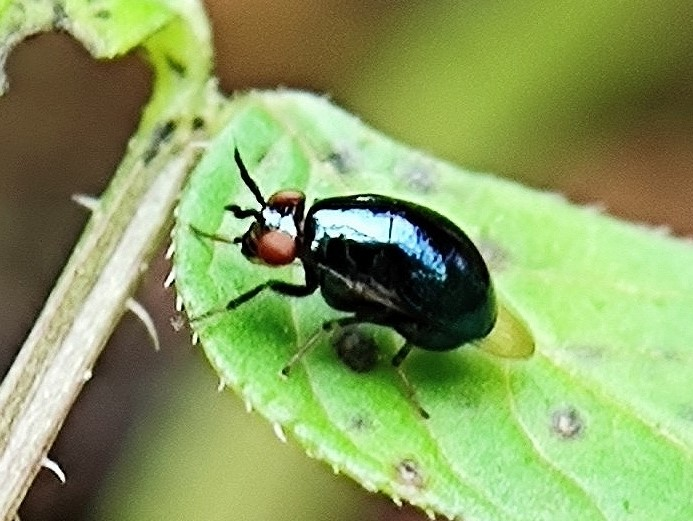

Scientific classification
- Kingdom: Animalia
- Phylum: Arthropoda
- Clade: Pancrustacea
- Class: Insecta
- Order: Diptera
- Subsection: Acalyptratae
- Superfamily: Lauxanioidea
- Family: Celyphidae
- Genus: Acelyphus; Malloch, 1929

Type species
- Acelyphus politus Malloch, 1929

= Acelyphus =

Genus of flies

Acelyphus is a genus of beetle flies. It is known from the Indomalayan realm.

== Description ==
Species of the genus Acelyphus are distinguished by the discal and second basal cell of the wing being joined.

== Species ==
- A. boettcheri Frey, 1941
- A. burmanus Datta, 1987
- A. digitatus Tenorio, 1969
- A. lateralis Tenorio, 1969
- A. lyneborgi Vanschuytbroeck, 1967
- A. melanothorax Tenorio, 1969
- A. politus Malloch, 1929
- A. prolatus Tenorio, 1972
- A. repletus Malloch, 1929
- A. retusus Tenorio, 1972
- A. stigmaticus (Hendel, 1914)
