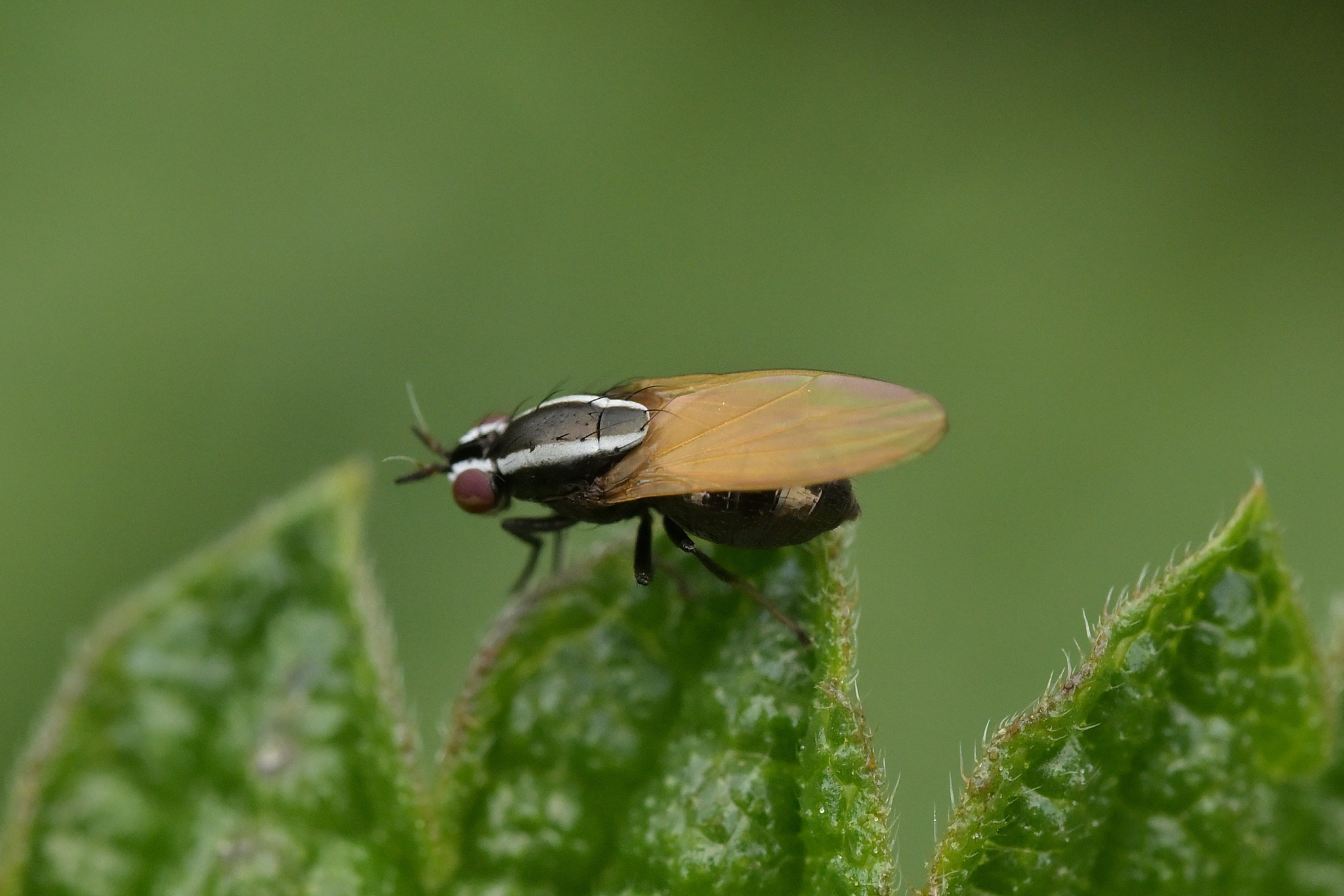
- Poecilohetaerella bilineata

Scientific classification
- Kingdom: Animalia
- Phylum: Arthropoda
- Clade: Pancrustacea
- Class: Insecta
- Order: Diptera
- Superfamily: Lauxanioidea
- Family: Lauxaniidae
- Genus: Poecilohetaerella; Tonnoir & Malloch, 1926

= Poecilohetaerella =

Genus of fly

Poecilohetaerella is a genus of fly from the Lauxaniidae family endemic to New Zealand.

== Species ==
As of April 2026, there are seven species:

- Poecilohetaerella antennata Harrison, 1959
- Poecilohetaerella bilineata (Hutton, 1901)
- Poecilohetaerella dubiosa Tonnoir & Malloch, 1926
- Poecilohetaerella minuta (Tonnoir & Malloch, 1926)
- Poecilohetaerella punctatifrons (Tonnoir & Malloch, 1926)
- Poecilohetaerella scutellata Harrison, 1959
- Poecilohetaerella watti Tonnoir & Malloch, 1926
