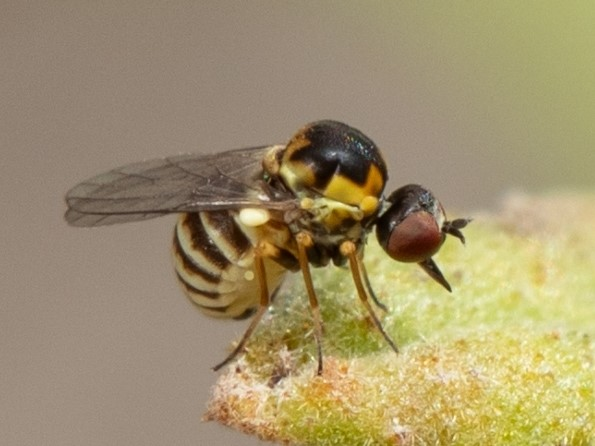
- Pieza rhea

Scientific classification
- Kingdom: Animalia
- Phylum: Arthropoda
- Class: Insecta
- Order: Diptera
- Family: Mythicomyiidae
- Subfamily: Mythicomyiinae
- Genus: Pieza; Evenhuis, 2002

Type species
- Mythicomyia angusta Melander, 1961

= Pieza =

Genus of flies

Pieza is a genus of flies in the family Mythicomyiidae. Its species are found in North America, South America, and the West Indies. The genus was named by Neal Evenhuis in 2002. Evenhuis included the following eleven species, transferring four from Mythicomyia, in his initial circumscription:

- P. agnastis (Hall, 1976) — Chile (Maule, Santiago)
- P. angusta (Melander, 1961) — United States (California, Arizona, New Mexico, Texas) and Mexico (Baja California, Jalisco, Sonora, Tamaulipas)
- P. deresistans Evenhuis, 2002 — northern Venezuela
- †P. dominicana Evenhuis, 2002 — Dominican amber, Miocene
- P. flavitibia Evenhuis, 2002 — northern Venezuela
- P. kake Evenhuis, 2002 — Brazil (Minas Gerais)
- P. minuta (Greene, 1924) — United States (Arizona, California, New Mexico) and Mexico (Baja California Sur, Sonora)
- P. ostenta (Melander, 1961) — United States (Arizona, California, Colorado, Texas, Utah) and Mexico (Baja California Sur, Sonora)
- P. pi Evenhuis, 2002 — Bahamas, Turks and Caicos, Mexico (Morelos)
- P. rhea Evenhuis, 2002 — United States (Florida)
- P. sinclairi Evenhuis, 2002 — Curaçao, Dominican Republic; introduced to Galápagos Islands

As of 2018, Pieza still consists of these eleven species.
