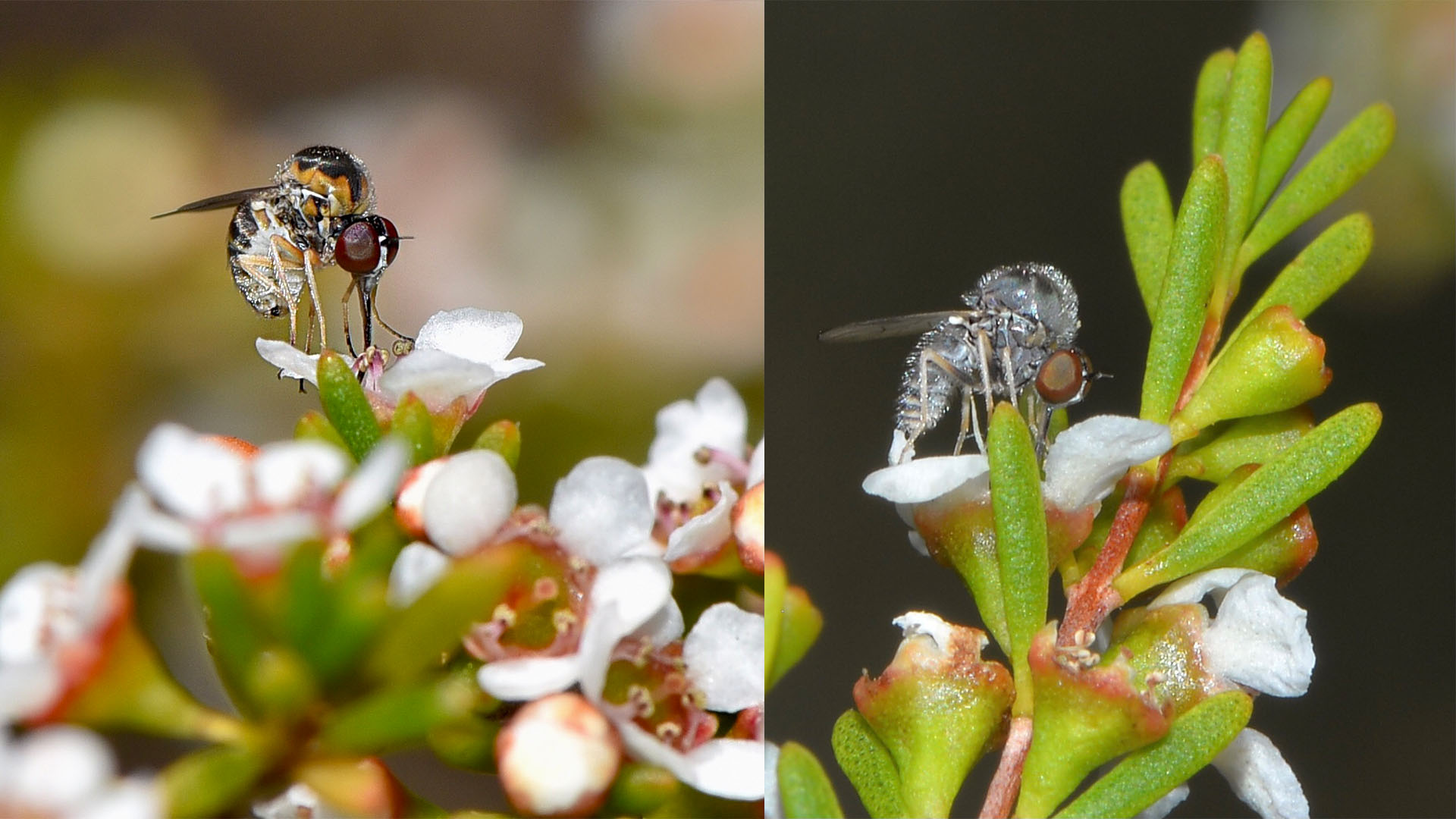
- Female (left) and male (right)

Scientific classification
- Kingdom: Animalia
- Phylum: Arthropoda
- Class: Insecta
- Order: Diptera
- Family: Mythicomyiidae
- Subfamily: Psiloderoidinae
- Genus: Zzyzzarro; Evenhuis, 2022
- Species: Z. hortorum

Binomial name
- Zzyzzarro hortorum Evenhuis, 2022

= Zzyzzarro =

Genus of flies

Zzyzzarro is a genus of tiny flies in the family Mythicomyiidae. The genus contains a single species, Zzyzzarro hortorum.

== Etymology ==
Zzyzzarro was named by Neal Evenhuis, who gives its etymology as a fantasy dragon name, meaning "The Gray One". He used a name generator to create the name. He did this as Zzyzzarro belongs to the family Mythicomyiidae which translates to "mythical flies". Evenhuis used the name generator to create names for other genera within the family including Qaysug and Xymrod.

The species epithet hortorum refers to Jean and Fred Hort who discovered and photographed the species and posted onto Flickr which was how it was found.

== Distribution ==
The species is native to Western Australia.
