= Atopocelyphus =

Scientific classification
- Kingdom: Animalia
- Phylum: Arthropoda
- Class: Insecta
- Order: Diptera
- Subsection: Acalyptratae
- Superfamily: Lauxanioidea
- Family: Celyphidae
- Genus: Atopocelyphus; Gaimari, 2017

Type species
- Celyphus ruficollis Macquart, 1844

Genus of flies

Atopocelyphus is a genus of beetle flies. It is known from the Neotropical realm.

== Species ==
- A. ruficollis (Macquart, 1844)
