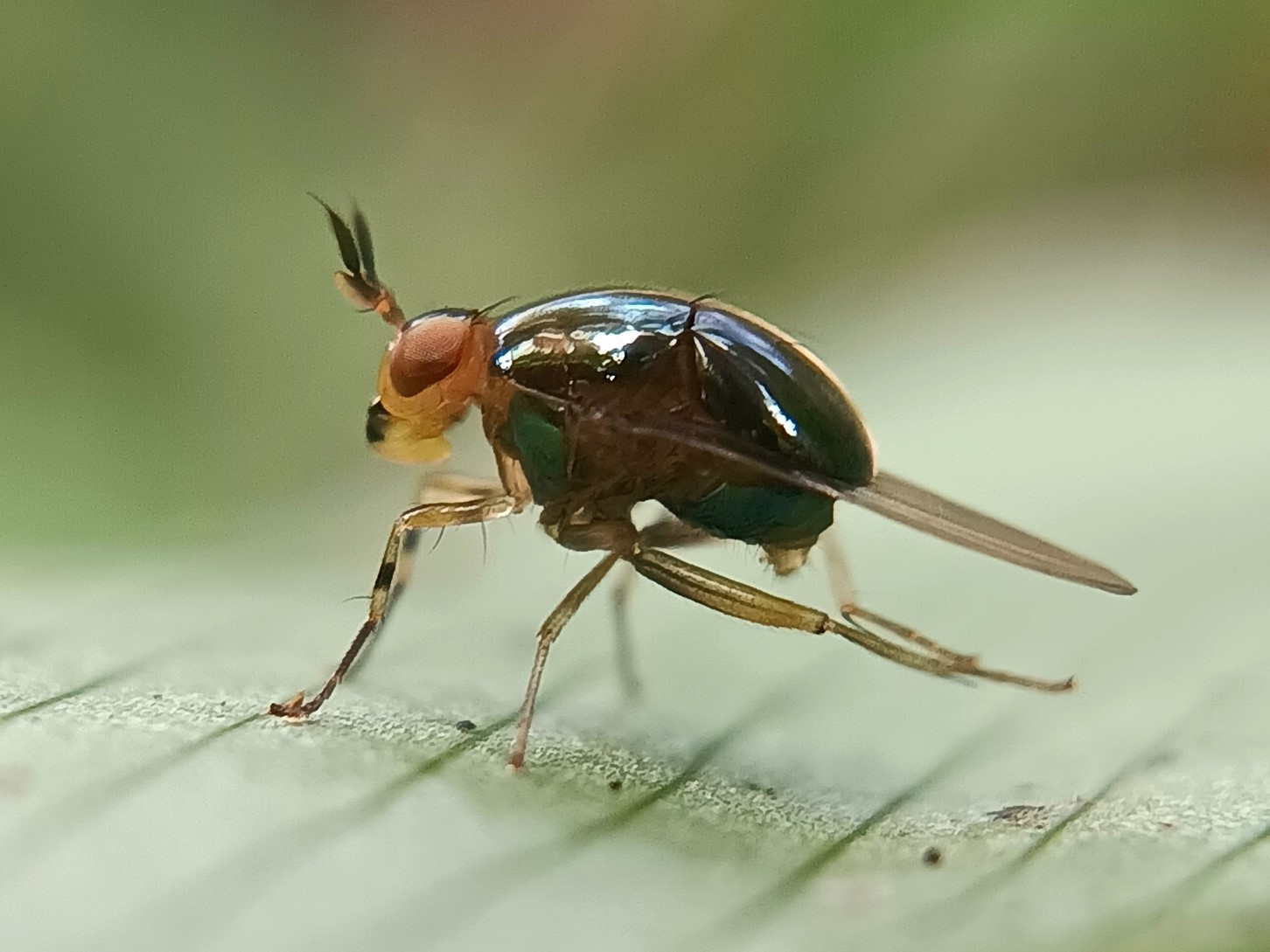

Scientific classification
- Kingdom: Animalia
- Phylum: Arthropoda
- Class: Insecta
- Order: Diptera
- Family: Celyphidae
- Genus: Idiocelyphus; Malloch, 1929

Type species
- Idiocelyphus bakeri Malloch, 1929

= Idiocelyphus =

Genus of flies

Idiocelyphus is a genus of beetle flies. It is known from the Indomalayan realm with most of the species in the genus from the Philippines.

== Description ==
Species of the genus Idiocelyphus may be distinguished from the other genera in the family by the presence of numerous bristles on the mesonotum and two pairs of scutellar bristles, the shorter scutellum is not any longer than the thorax.

== Species ==
- I. bakeri Malloch, 1929
- I. bifasciatus Tenorio, 1969
- I. bilobus Tenorio, 1969
- I. forcipatus Tenorio, 1969
- I. parviceps Tenorio, 1969
- I. raniformis Tenorio, 1969
- I. spatulus Tenorio, 1969
- I. steyskali Tenorio, 1969
