= Campsicnemus popeye =

Scientific classification
- Domain: Eukaryota
- Kingdom: Animalia
- Phylum: Arthropoda
- Class: Insecta
- Order: Diptera
- Family: Dolichopodidae
- Genus: Campsicnemus
- Species: C. popeye

Binomial name
- Campsicnemus popeye Evenhuis, 2013

Species of fly

Campsicnemus popeye is a species of carnivorous fly described in 2013. It was discovered from the Society Islands in French Polynesia. The species is named after the famous cartoon character Popeye the Sailor Man because of the enlarged tibia (which are like the bulging forearms of Popeye). The species is in fact among a group of six new species described as "Popeye flies". The specimen was collected in 2006 during an expedition to Tahiti.

== Discovery and etymology ==
Campsicnemus popeye was discovered as a part of Terrestrial Arthropods of French Polynesia Survey funded by the U.S. National Science Foundation. The survey covered the Society Islands of French Polynesia during 2004 and 2007, and the survey successfully discovered dozens of new species. The survey team was led by Neal L. Evenhuis, former president of the International Commission on Zoological Nomenclature and a Senior Research Entomologist at the Bishop Museum in Hawaii. The formal description was published on 3 August 2013 in the journal Zootaxa. Evenhuis, known for his eccentric style of giving binomial names, gave the specific name C. popeye because the swollen mid-tibia (middle legs) of the fly somewhat resemble the bulging forearms of the well-known cartoon hero Popeye the Sailor Man

== Description ==
Adult Campsicnemus popeye has a body length between 3 and 3.2 mm, and wing length of 3.1 to 3.6 mm. Its head is black in colour with dark-brown toward the front face. It has a pair of antennae and a pair of compound eyes, which are distinctively red. The antennal segments are a mixture of black and yellow patterns. The main body (thorax) is yellow, while its setae are black. The mid-tibia is particularly enlarged towards the apical region, somewhat like the swollen forearms of Popeye. The wing membrane is uniformly pale-smoky coloured. The abdominal segments (tergites) are largely brown, with yellow stripes on the sites of tergites II and IV. Each tergite has numerous short black hairs on the dorsal side, and few long hairs on the side. The main difference of a female from a male is absence of large spiny setae on the legs, and the swollen legs.

== Biology ==
Male Campsicnemus popeye use their enlarged tibiae for attracting females. It was humorously reported that the fly does not like spinach, in contrast to its namesake, and is in fact strictly carnivorous. However, much like Popeye trying to woo Olive Oyl, the male fly flexes its muscular legs during courtship rituals to impress the potential mate. They are found to congregate around bodies of water.
