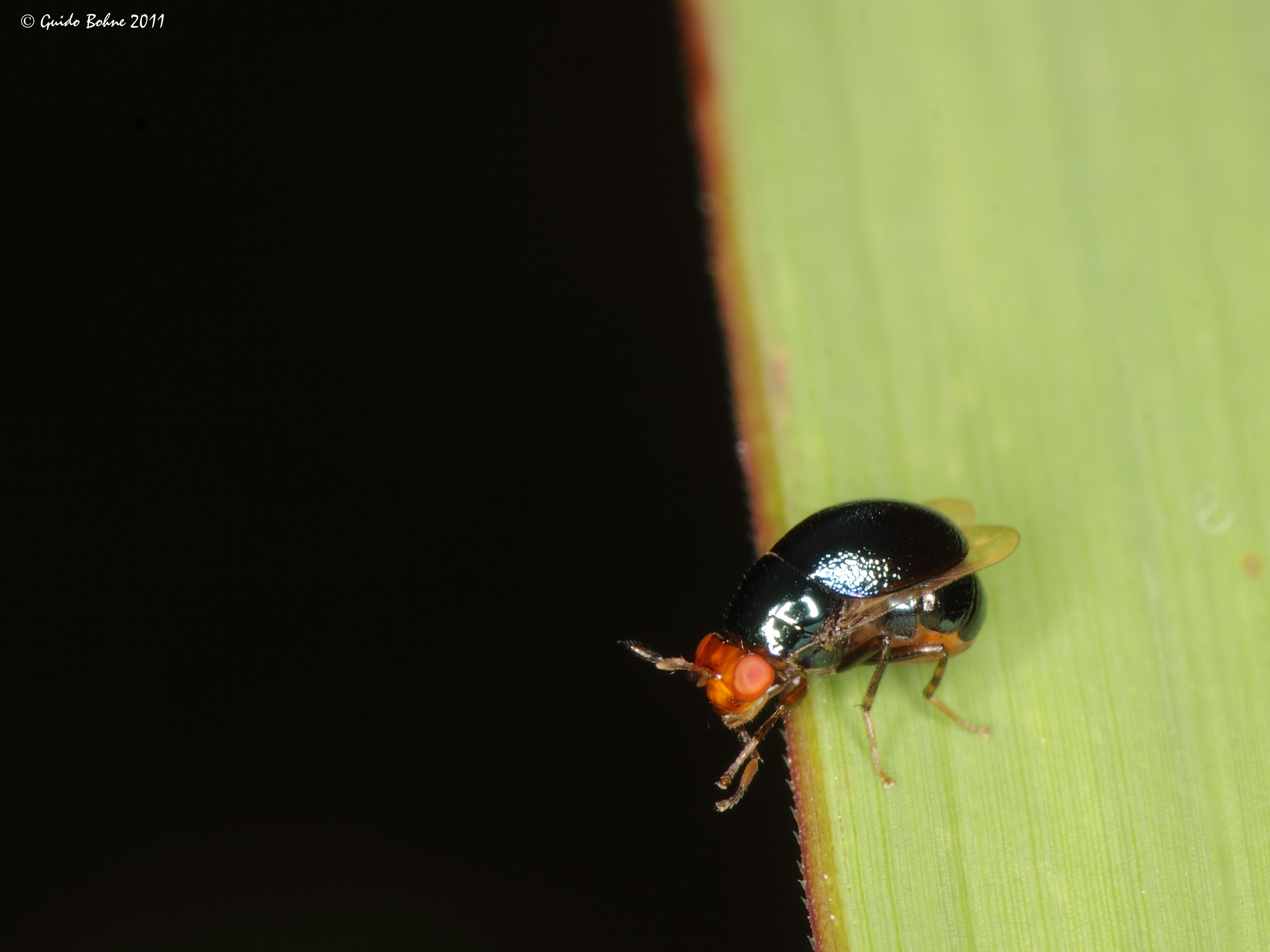
- Spaniocelyphus palmi

Scientific classification
- Kingdom: Animalia
- Phylum: Arthropoda
- Class: Insecta
- Order: Diptera
- Family: Celyphidae
- Genus: Spaniocelyphus; Hendel, 1914

Type species
- Celyphus scutatus Wiedemann, 1830

= Spaniocelyphus =

Genus of flies

Spaniocelyphus is a genus of beetle flies known from the Indomalayan realm.

== Description ==
Spaniocelyphus may be distinguished by having a sharp vertex, reduced or absent postvertical bristles, and a crossvein separating discal cell from second basal cell.

== Species ==
- S. hangchowensis Ouchi, 1939
- S. laevis: Malloch, 1929
- S. nigrocoeruleus Malloch, 1929
- S. palawanensis Vanschuytbroek, 1967
- S. palmi Frey, 1941
- S. scutatus (Wiedemann, 1830)
- S. viridescens Tenorio, 1969
