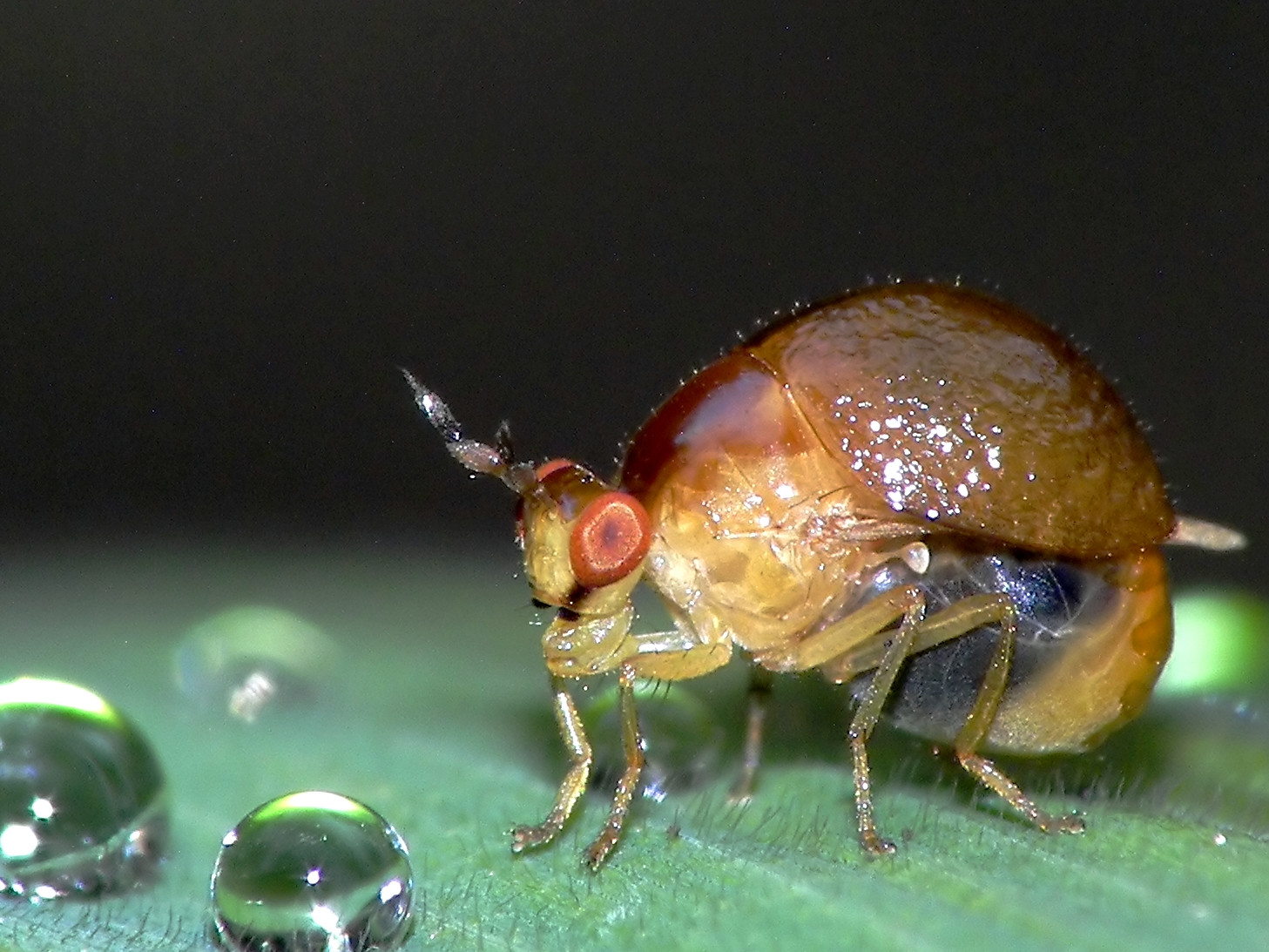

Scientific classification
- Kingdom: Animalia
- Phylum: Arthropoda
- Class: Insecta
- Order: Diptera
- Superfamily: Lauxanioidea
- Family: Celyphidae; Bigot, 1852

Type genus
- Celyphus Dalman, 1818

= Celyphidae =

Family of flies

The Celyphidae, commonly known as beetle flies or beetle-backed flies, are a family of flies (order Diptera). About 115 species in about 9 genera are known chiefly from the Oriental and Afrotropic biogeographic regions with one lineage in the New World.

== Description ==
Celyphidae are small to medium-sized and easily recognised. The scutellum is enlarged, and forming a protective shell over the abdomen, giving them a beetle-like appearance. Also, like many beetles, Celyphidae are often shiny or metallic in color. The head has few bristles. The wings, when at rest, are folded beneath the scutellar "shell". The arista of the antenna is often flattened and leaf-like at the base. The family name is derived from the Greek word κέλυφος for pod or shell. Male celyphids lack an aedeagus and instead have paired gonapophyses that are used in copulation and are of key taxonomic value.

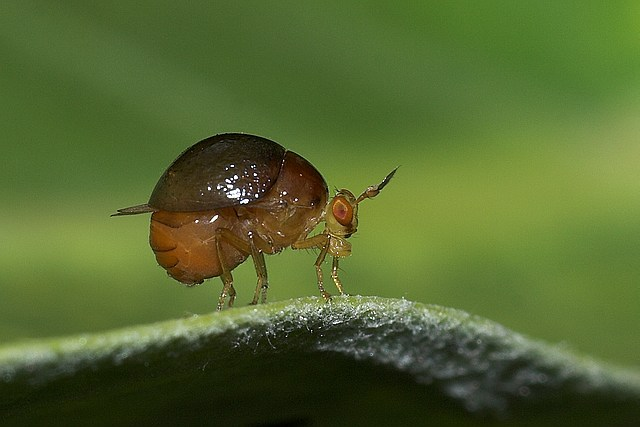
A live specimen from Shendurney Hills, Kerala, India

== Biology ==
The biology of the family is poorly known. Adults are found along streams and rivers, and in wet, grassy areas. Larvae are saprophagous.

== Relatives ==
The family Celyphidae is considered by most authors to be the sister taxon of the Lauxaniidae (e.g., Griffiths 1972), and this has been supported by some molecular studies which suggest the (Chamaemyiidae + (Lauxaniidae + Celyphidae)) within the Lauxanoiodea. In the past they have occasionally been considered a specialized lineage within the Lauxaniidae.

== Classification ==
- Genus Acelyphus Malloch, 1929 - Asia
- Genus Atopocelyphus, Gaimari, 2017 - French Guiana
- Genus Celyphus Dalman, 1818 - Africa and Asia
  - Subgenus Celyphus Dalman, 1818 - Asia
  - Subgenus Hemiglobus Frey, 1941 - Africa
  - Subgenus Paracelyphus Bigot, 1859 - Asia
- Genus Chamaecelyphus Frey, 1941 - Africa
- Genus Idiocelyphus Malloch, 1929 - Asia
- Genus Oocelyphus Chen, 1949 - southern China
- Genus Spaniocelyphus Hendel, 1914 - Africa and Asia
