= Sweziella =

Scientific classification
- Kingdom: Animalia
- Phylum: Arthropoda
- Clade: Pancrustacea
- Class: Insecta
- Order: Diptera
- Family: Dolichopodidae
- Subfamily: incertae sedis
- Genus: Sweziella; Van Duzee, 1933

Type species
- Sweziella albifacies (= Eurynogaster virida Van Duzee, 1933) Van Duzee, 1933

Genus of flies

Sweziella is a genus of flies belonging to the family Dolichopodidae, endemic to Hawaii. It is part of the Eurynogaster complex of genera.

== Species ==
The genus includes the following species:

- Sweziella aeruginosa (Hardy & Kohn, 1964)
- Sweziella conspicua (Hardy & Kohn, 1964)
- Sweziella emarginata (Tenorio, 1969)
- Sweziella gracilipennata (Hardy & Kohn, 1964)
- Sweziella pictilipennata (Tenorio, 1969)
- Sweziella tergoprolixa (Hardy & Kohn, 1964)
- Sweziella virida (Van Duzee, 1933)
