= Campsicnemus hirtipes =

Scientific classification
- Domain: Eukaryota
- Kingdom: Animalia
- Phylum: Arthropoda
- Class: Insecta
- Order: Diptera
- Family: Dolichopodidae
- Genus: Campsicnemus
- Species: C. hirtipes

Binomial name
- Campsicnemus hirtipes Loew, 1861

Species of fly

Campsicnemus hirtipes is a species of long-legged fly in the family Dolichopodidae.
