= Cremifaniidae =

Scientific classification
- Domain: Eukaryota
- Kingdom: Animalia
- Phylum: Arthropoda
- Class: Insecta
- Order: Diptera
- Superfamily: Lauxanioidea
- Family: Cremifaniidae; McAlpine, 1963

Type genus
- Cremifania

Family of flies

The Cremifaniidae are a very small family of acalyptrate flies with only 4 described species worldwide. All species are considered rare, and nothing is known of their life history. They were formerly placed in the family Chamaemyiidae.

== Classification ==
There is only one genus in the family.

genus Cremifania Czerny, 1904

- C. bulgarica Papp, 2010
- C. lanceolata Papp, 1994
- C. nearctica McAlpine, 1963
- C. nigrocellulata Czerny, 1904
