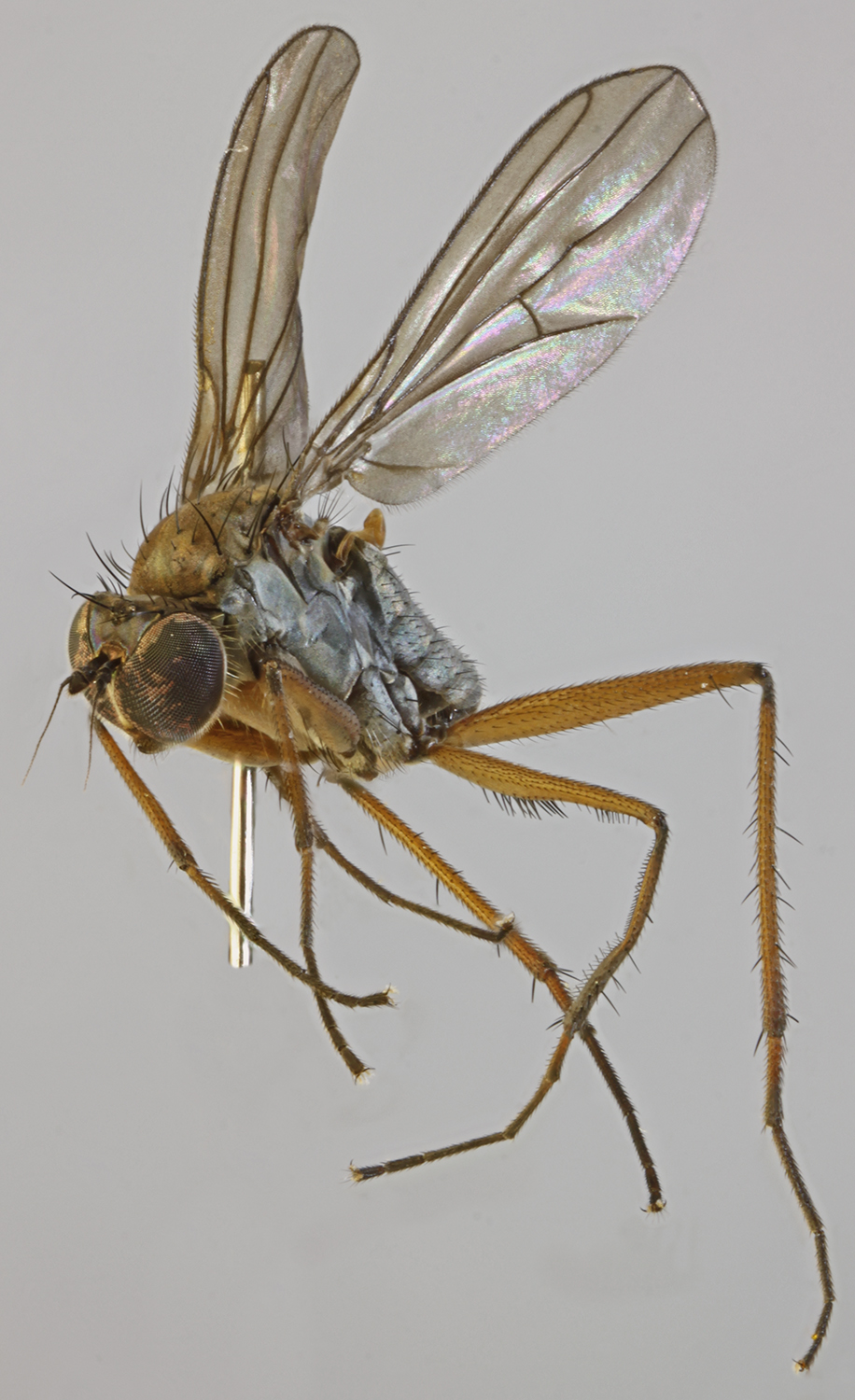
- Campsicnemus loripes North Wales

Scientific classification
- Kingdom: Animalia
- Phylum: Arthropoda
- Class: Insecta
- Order: Diptera
- Family: Dolichopodidae
- Genus: Campsicnemus
- Species: C. loripes

Binomial name
- Campsicnemus loripes (Haliday, 1832)

= Campsicnemus loripes =

Species of fly

Campsicnemus loripes is a species of fly in the family Dolichopodidae. It is distributed in Europe.
