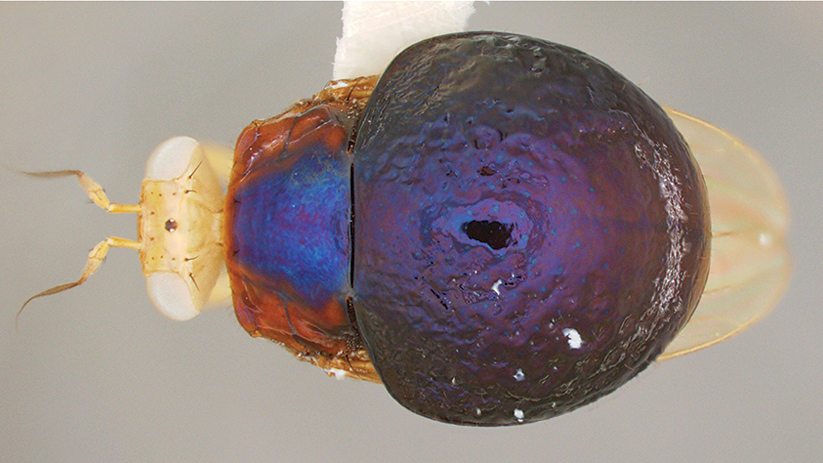
- Female specimen of Celyphus aurora.
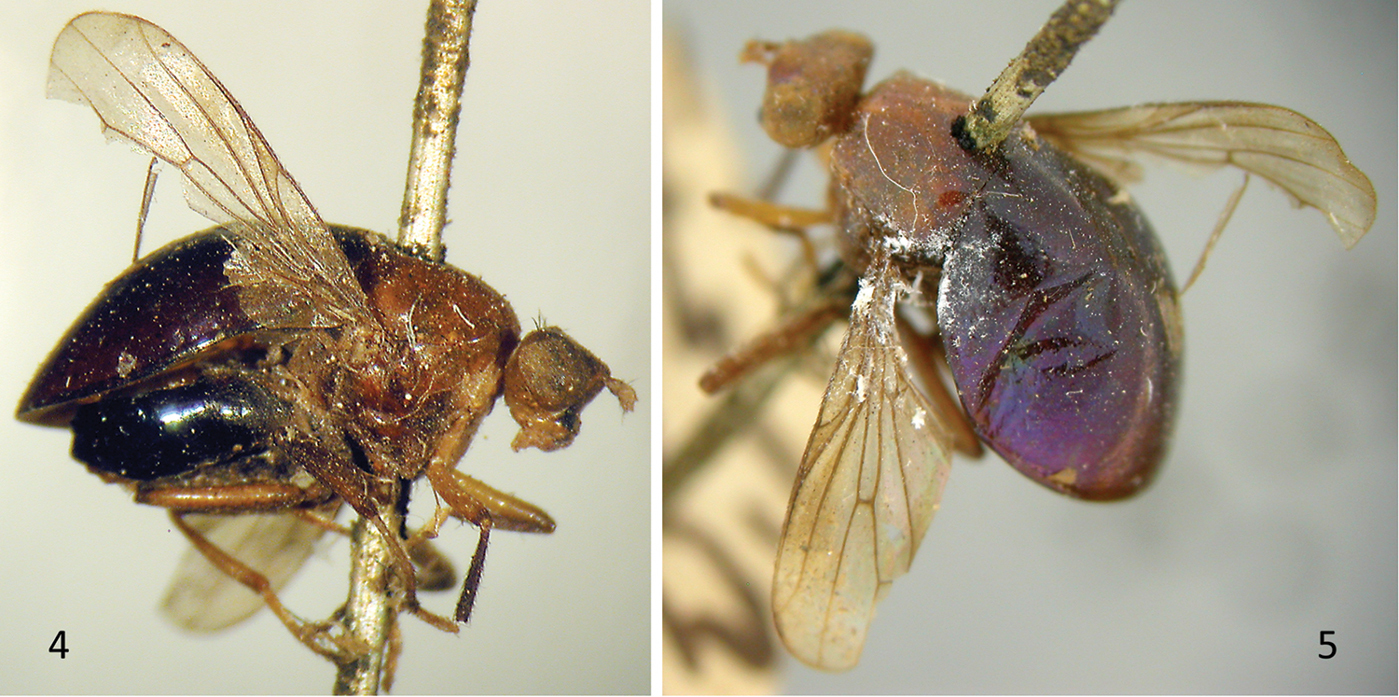
- Male of Celyphus ruficollis

Scientific classification
- Kingdom: Animalia
- Phylum: Arthropoda
- Clade: Pancrustacea
- Class: Insecta
- Order: Diptera
- Subsection: Acalyptratae
- Superfamily: Lauxanioidea
- Family: Celyphidae
- Genus: Celyphus; Dalman, 1818

Type species
- Celyphus obtectus Dalman, 1818

Subgenera
- Celyphus Dalman, 1818; Hemiglobus Frey, 1941; Paracelyphus Bigot, 1859

= Celyphus =

Genus of flies

Celyphus is a genus of beetle flies that belongs to the family Celyphidae. Members of this genus are known being be found in Oriental and Afrotropical realms.

== Description ==
Celyphus may be distinguished by the discal and second basal cell of the wing being distinct.

== Taxonomy ==
Up to 1859, all species of beetle flies were placed in this genus.

=== Species ===
This genus contains many species that are divided into three subgenera: Celyphus, Hemiglobus and Paracelyphus. They are listed below:

- C. abnormis
- C. bisetosus
- C. cheni
- C. collaris
- C. dentis
- C. divisus
- C. eos
- C. forcipus
- C. fujianensis
- C. immitans
- C. lacunosus
- C. lobus
- C. maculis
- C. medogis
- C. microchaetus
- C. mirabilis
- C. nigritarsus
- C. nigrivittis
- C. obtectus
- C. obtusus
- C. paradentatus
- C. pellucidus
- C. planitarsalis
- C. porosus
- C. pulchmaculatus
- C. puncticeps
- C. quadrimaculatus
- C. resplendens
- C. reticulatus
- C. rugosus
- C. scutatus
- C. testaceus
- C. trichoporis
- C. unicolor
- C. violaceus
- C. vittalis
- C. xizanganus
