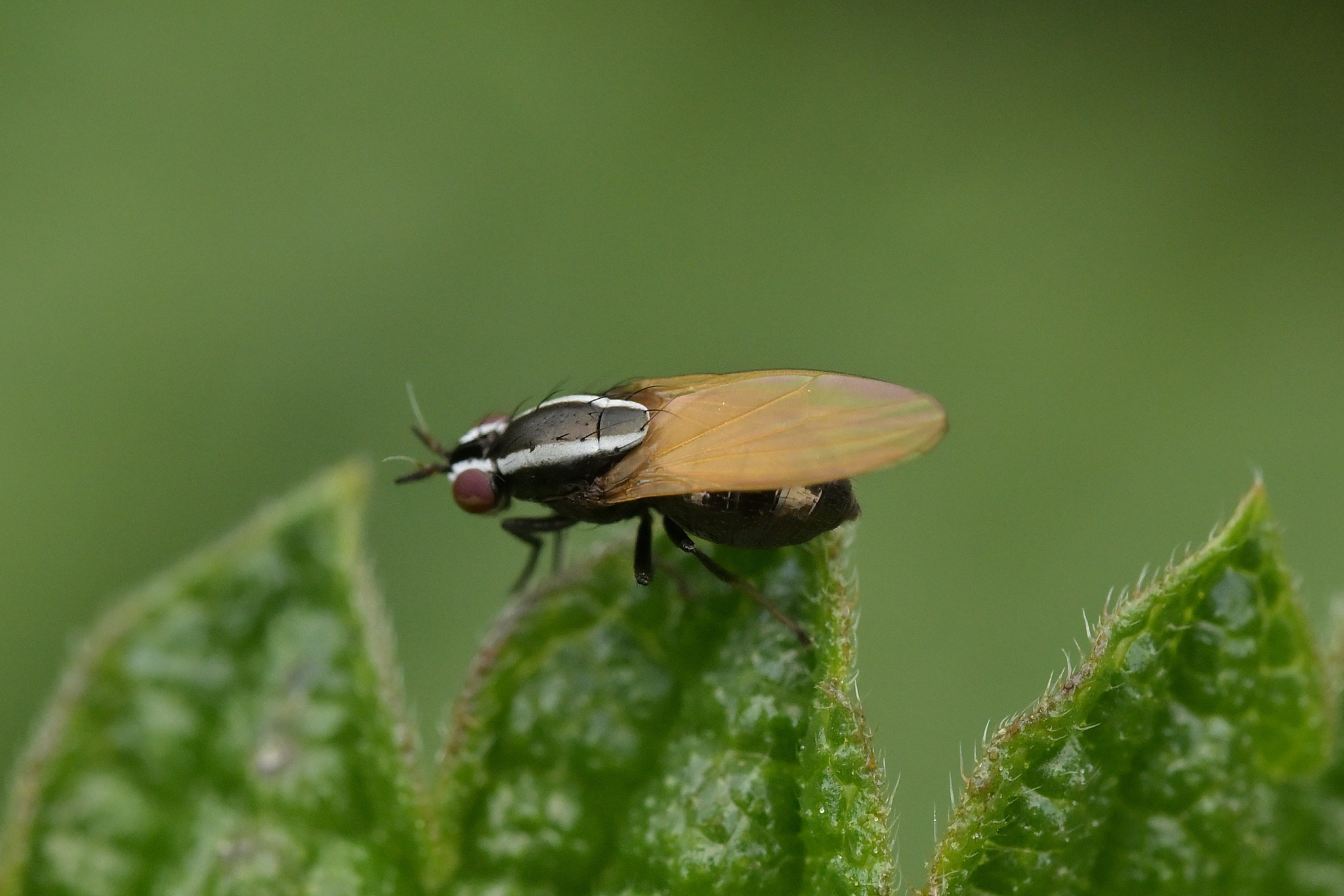

Scientific classification
- Kingdom: Animalia
- Phylum: Arthropoda
- Clade: Pancrustacea
- Class: Insecta
- Order: Diptera
- Family: Lauxaniidae
- Genus: Poecilohetaerella
- Species: P. bilineata

Binomial name
- Poecilohetaerella bilineata (Hutton, 1901)

Synonyms
- List: Lauxania bilineata Hutton, 1901; Lauxania carbonaria Hutton, 1902

= Poecilohetaerella bilineata =

Species of fly

Poecilohetaerella bilineata, commonly referred to as the whitestriped litter fly, is a species of fly from the family Lauxaniidae endemic to New Zealand.

== Taxonomy ==
This species was first described as Lauxania bilineata in 1901 by entomologist Frederick Hutton. Hutton accidentally described the species again in 1902 as Lauxania carbonaria. In 1926, it was moved to the newly erected genus Poecilohetaerella and L carbonaria was recognized as a synonym. It was most recently given an updated revision in 1959. The holotype specimen is stored in Canterbury Museum. It is commonly referred to as the whitestriped litter fly.

== Description ==
The body and wings are around 3.5 mm in length. It is overall dark brown in colour. On the upper surface of the body is a pair of white bands that begin at the head and run down the body to the base of the thorax. It can be distinguished from other Poecilohetaerella by the combination of dark brown colouration of the area on the head between the antennae and vertex (and between the eyes), and by the third segment of the antennae being roughly 3 times longer than wide.

== Distribution ==
This species is widespread throughout New Zealand, being found in both the North and South Island. It is also found on offshore islands such as the Chatham Islands and the subantarctic Campbell Islands and Auckland Islands.
