= Glabellula =

Scientific classification
- Kingdom: Animalia
- Phylum: Arthropoda
- Clade: Pancrustacea
- Class: Insecta
- Order: Diptera
- Family: Mythicomyiidae
- Subfamily: Mythicomyiinae
- Genus: Glabellula; Bezzi, 1902

Type species
- Platygaster arctica Zetterstedt, 1838

Genus of flies

Glabellula is a genus of micro bee flies in the family Mythicomyiidae. There are more than 40 described species in Glabellula.

== Species ==
These 41 species belong to the genus Glabellula:

- Glabellula antioquensis Ramos-Pastrana, Córdoba-Suarez & Evenhuis, 2023
- Glabellula archboldi Evenhuis, 2025
- Glabellula arctica (Zetterstedt, 1838)
- Glabellula australis (Malloch, 1924)
- Glabellula binotata Hall & Evenhuis, 1984
- † Glabellula brunnifrons Evenhuis, 2002
- Glabellula canariensis Frey, 1936
- Glabellula catiapatiuae Mendes, Evenhuis, Limeira-de-Oliveira & Lamas, 2022
- Glabellula crassicornis (Greene, 1924)
- Glabellula deyrupi Evenhuis, 2025
- †Glabellula electrica Hennig, 1966
- Glabellula fasciata Melander, 1950
- Glabellula femorata (Loew, 1873)
- Glabellula floridana Evenhuis, 2025
- Glabellula fumipennis Hall & Evenhuis, 1984
- † Glabellula grimaldii Evenhuis, 2002
- †Glabellula hannemanni Schumann, 1991
- Glabellula hospes Evenhuis, 2022
- Glabellula humeralis Gharali & Evenhuis, 2011
- †Glabellula interrupta Evenhuis, 2013
- †Glabellula kuehnei Schlüter, 1976
- Glabellula madagascarensis Evenhuis, 2022
- Glabellula maroccana Evenhuis & Kettani, 2018
- Glabellula meridionalis Francois, 1955
- Glabellula metatarsalis Melander, 1950
- Glabellula nanella Melander, 1950
- Glabellula natalensis Hesse, 1967
- Glabellula nobilis Kertesz, 1912
- †Glabellula perkovskyi Evenhuis, 2013
- Glabellula pumila Melander, 1950
- Glabellula rafaelae Mendes, Evenhuis, Limeira-de-Oliveira & Lamas, 2022
- Glabellula rotundipennis Melander, 1950
- Glabellula sarahae Mendes, Evenhuis, Limeira-de-Oliveira & Lamas, 2022
- Glabellula sargahi Taheri & Gharali, 2025
- Glabellula sufflava François, 1969
- Glabellula tagos Evenhuis, 2019
- Glabellula thespia Evenhuis, 2009
- Glabellula unicolor Strobl, 1910
- Glabellula vibex Evenhuis, 2022
- Glabellula whartoni Evenhuis, 2019
- Glabellula yemeni Evenhuis & Gharali, 2020
