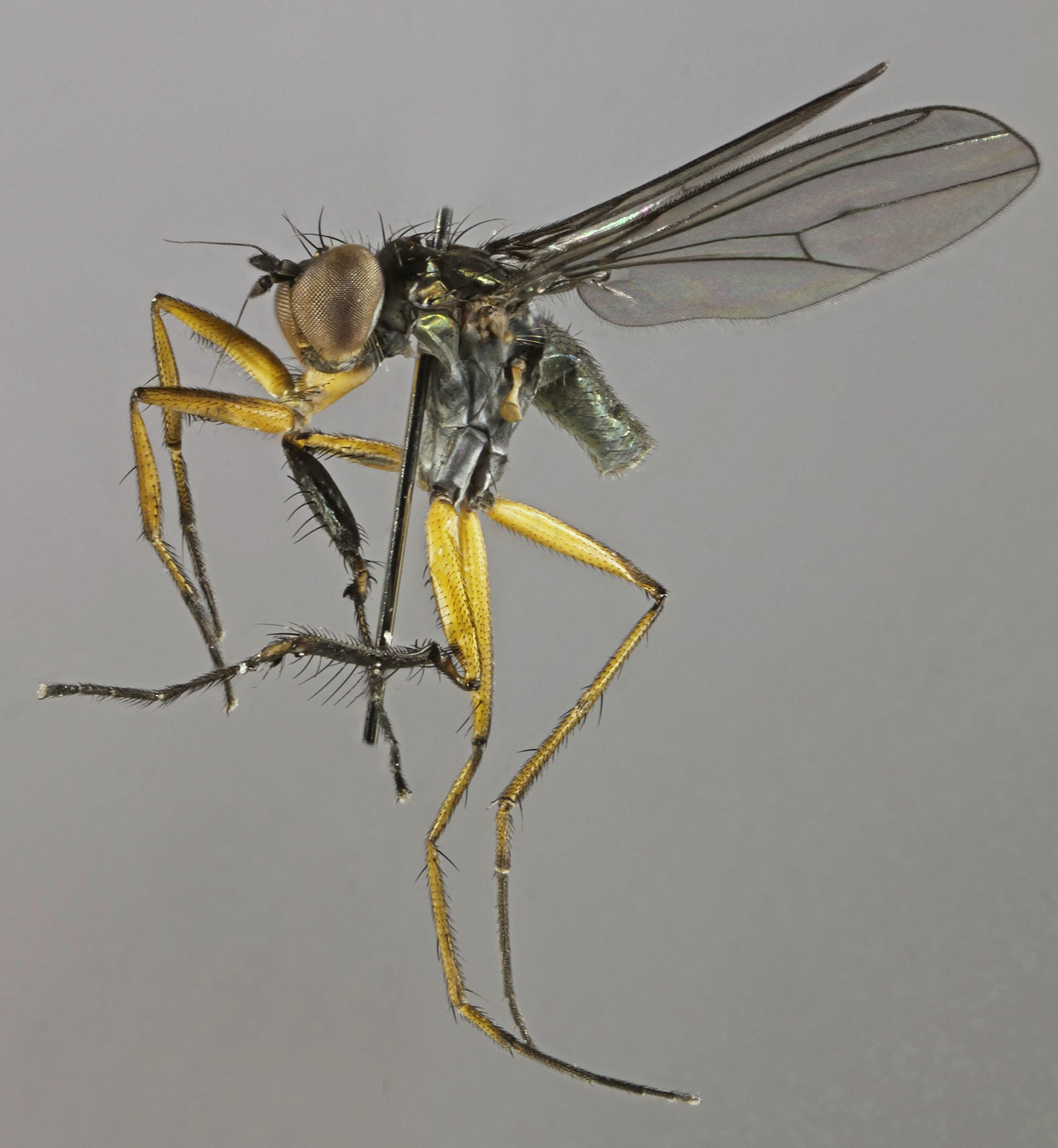
- Campsicnemus scambus North Wales

Scientific classification
- Kingdom: Animalia
- Phylum: Arthropoda
- Class: Insecta
- Order: Diptera
- Family: Dolichopodidae
- Subfamily: Sympycninae
- Genus: Campsicnemus
- Species: C. scambus

Binomial name
- Campsicnemus scambus (Fallén, 1823)

Synonyms
- Dolichopus scambus Fallén, 1823

= Campsicnemus scambus =

Species of fly

Campsicnemus scambus is a species of fly in the family Dolichopodidae. It is distributed in Europe, except for the south.
