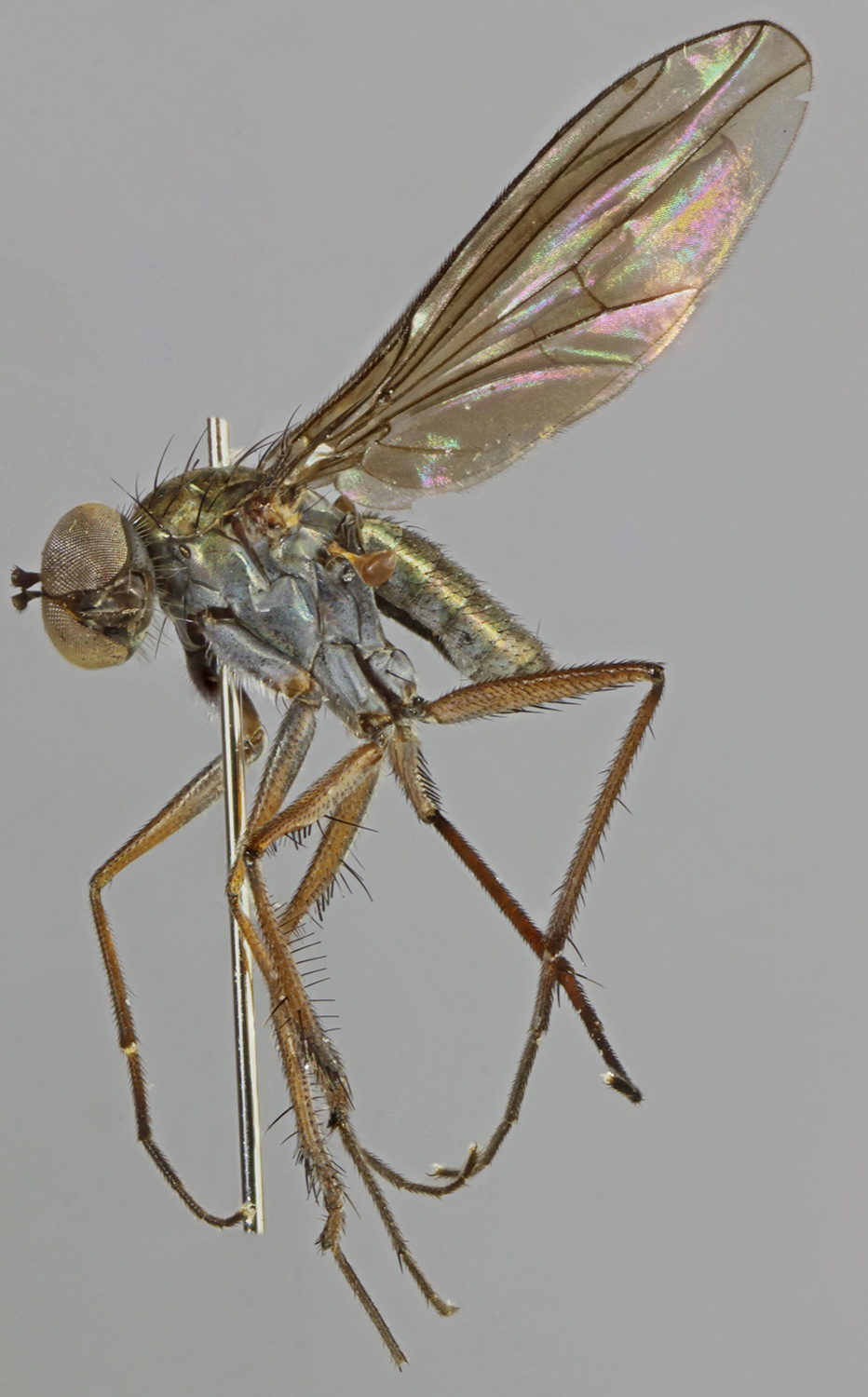
- Campsicnemus curvipes North Wales

Scientific classification
- Kingdom: Animalia
- Phylum: Arthropoda
- Class: Insecta
- Order: Diptera
- Family: Dolichopodidae
- Subfamily: Sympycninae
- Genus: Campsicnemus
- Species: C. curvipes

Binomial name
- Campsicnemus curvipes (Fallén, 1823)

Synonyms
- Dolichopus curvipes Fallén, 1823

= Campsicnemus curvipes =

Species of fly

Campsicnemus curvipes is a species of fly in the family Dolichopodidae. It is distributed in Europe and North Africa.
