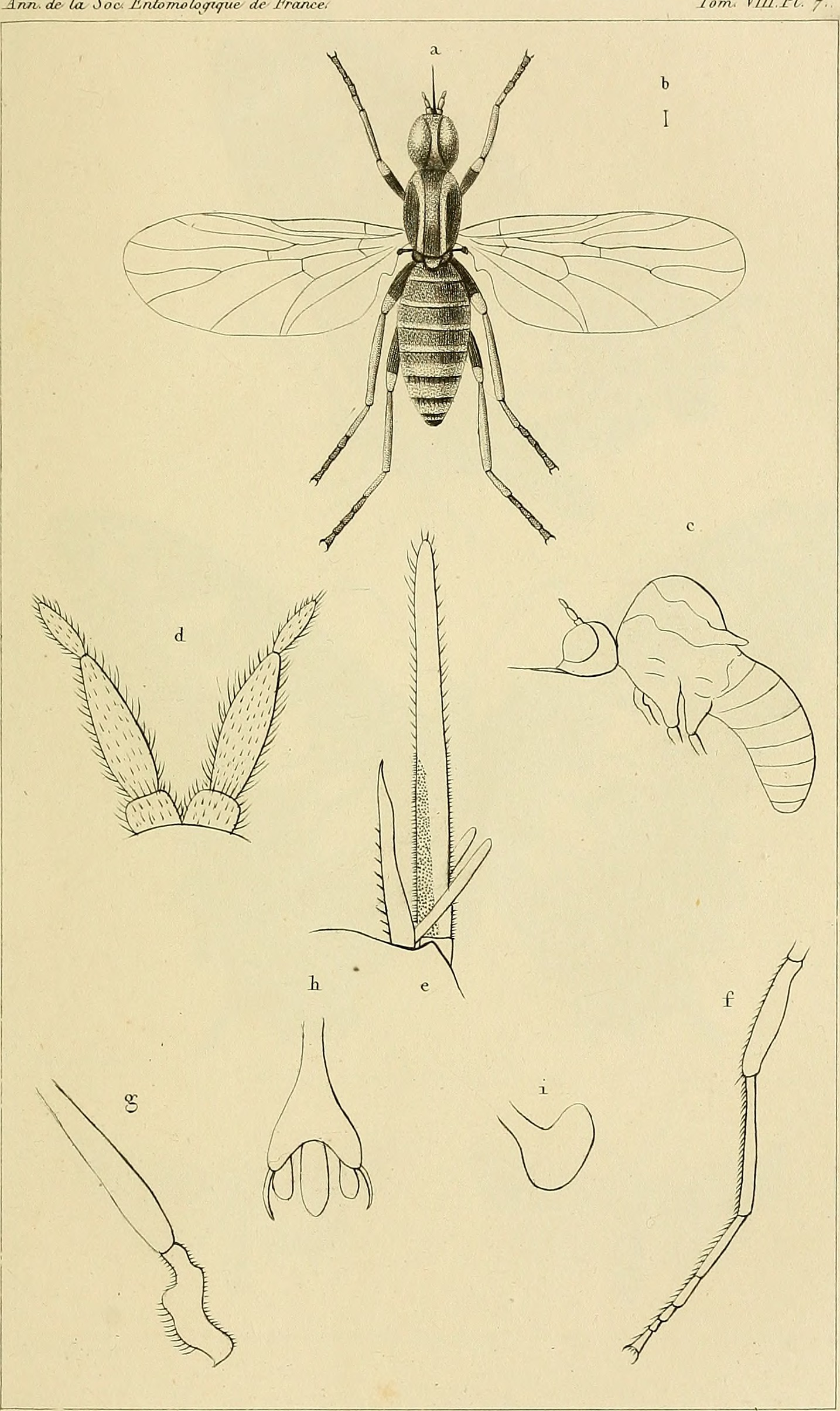
- Cyrtosia marginata

Scientific classification
- Kingdom: Animalia
- Phylum: Arthropoda
- Class: Insecta
- Order: Diptera
- Family: Mythicomyiidae
- Subfamily: Platypyginae
- Genus: Cyrtosia; Perris, 1839

Species
- See text

= Cyrtosia (fly) =

Genus of flies

Cyrtosia is a genus of insects in the family Mythicomyiidae.

== Species ==
C. abragi – Cyrtosia aglota – Cyrtosia arabica – Cyrtosia canariensis – Cyrtosia chongorica – Cyrtosia cinerascens – Cyrtosia flavorufa – Cyrtosia geniculata – Cyrtosia gulperii – Cyrtosia injii – Cyrtosia jeanneli – Cyrtosia luteiventris – Cyrtosia marginata – Cyrtosia meridionalis – Cyrtosia namaquensis – Cyrtosia nigrescens – Cyrtosia nitidissima – Cyrtosia nubila – Cyrtosia obscuripes – Cyrtosia occidentalis – Cyrtosia opaca – Cyrtosia pallipes – Cyrtosia panemplio – Cyrtosia perfecta – Cyrtosia persica – Cyrtosia pruinosula – Cyrtosia pusilla – Cyrtosia separata – Cyrtosia serena – Cyrtosia stuckenbergi – Cyrtosia subnitens – Cyrtosia tetragramma – Cyrtosia zygophrys
