= JoAnn M. Tenorio =

American entomologist (1943–2019)

- Born: JoAnn Marie Rummel; February 5, 1943; Chardon, Ohio
- Died: March 3, 2019 (aged 76); Honolulu
- Occupations: Entomologist, author, publishing manager
- Relatives: Rudolph Rummel

JoAnn Marie Tenorio (February 5, 1943 – March 3, 2019) was an American entomologist who also worked in publishing in Hawaii. She was co-author of two popular manuals, What Bit Me? (1993) and What's Bugging Me? (1995).

== Early life ==
JoAnn Marie Rummel was born in Chardon, Ohio, the daughter of Randolph Rummel and Nellie Gower Rummel. When she was a teenager, she moved to Hawaii to live with her older brother, political scientist Rudolph Rummel. She attended the University of Hawaii at Manoa, studying entomology, and completed doctoral studies there in 1971, with a dissertation titled A revision of the Celyphidae (Diptera) of the Oriental region (published 1972).

== Career ==
Tenorio worked at the Bishop Museum in Hawaii, where she was an acarologist in the Department of Entomology, and Journals Manager at Bishop Museum Press. She later worked at University of Hawaii Press as a journals and book production manager. She was co-author (with Gordon M. Nishida) of What Bit Me?: Identifying Hawai'i's Stinging and Biting Insects and Their Kin (1993) and What's Bugging Me?: Identifying and Controlling Household Pests in Hawaii (1995). "Tenorio came up with the idea for What Bit Me? after answering hundreds of phone queries from local residents who wanted to know if they had been bitten or stung by something dangerous," according to one review.

Her research involved Hawaiian mites and Celyphus (a genus of beetle flies), and Idiocelyphus (another genus of beetle flies). Scholarly publications included Ecotoparasites of Hawaiian rodents (1980). She was co-author of a volume of Insects of Hawaii (1969). She won the Excellence in Production award from the Hawaii Book Publishers Association in 1999, for her work on Atlas of Hawaii, Third Edition.

== Personal life ==
In 1962, Rummel married Joaquin A. Tenorio, a fellow entomology student. She died in 2019, aged 76 years, in Honolulu.
