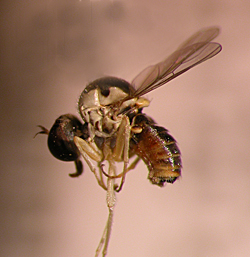
- Undescribed psiloderoidine genus from Australia

Scientific classification
- Kingdom: Animalia
- Phylum: Arthropoda
- Class: Insecta
- Order: Diptera
- Suborder: Brachycera
- Infraorder: Asilomorpha
- Superfamily: Asiloidea
- Family: Mythicomyiidae; Melander, 1902

Subfamilies
- Psiloderoidinae; Platypyginae; Glabellulinae; Empidideicinae; Leylaiyinae; Mythicomyiinae

= Mythicomyiidae =

Family of flies

Mythicomyiidae, commonly called mythicomyiids, are very tiny flies (0.5–5.0 mm) found throughout most parts of the world, especially desert and semi-desert regions, except the highest altitudes and latitudes. They are not as common in the tropics, but genera such as Cephalodromia and Platypygus are known from these regions. Many of these "microbombyliids" have a humpbacked thorax (as in the Acroceridae) and lack the dense vestiture common in the Bombyliidae. Mythicomyiids have until recently not had much attention in the literature. Their small size has caused them to be missed when collecting. Yellow pan trapping and fine-mesh netting in Malaise and aerial sweep nets has resulted in a number of undescribed species from many parts of the world. A high diversity of both genera and species exists for this family in Africa, especially northern and southern portions. More than 450 species are known (most in the genus Mythicomyia Coquillett). Hundreds more await description.

Because of their extremely small size and curious body shapes, some genera have been at times placed in the Acroceridae or Empididae. Originally, taxa were placed in the subfamily Mythicomyiinae in the Empididae. Later, they were transferred to the Bombyliidae, where mythicomyiids have long been treated. Zaitzev (1991) was the first to give characters warranting raising the group to family level. Subsequent workers have followed Zaitzev's lead and treat the group as a separate family. The family is separated from the Bombyliidae by the unbranched wing vein R4+5 (branched in Bombyliidae), the extremely reduced or absent maxillary palpi (present in Bombyliidae), wings held together over the abdomen at rest (held at an angle in Bombyliidae), and the abdominal spiracles being placed in the terga (placed in the pleural membrane in Bombyliidae). Augmenting the morphological characters, it is also a much older lineage than any known Bombyliidae, dating from as far back as the Middle Jurassic (Palaeoplatypygus Kovalev; Callovian: 163–168 mya) with other genera known from the Cretaceous (Procyrtosia Hennig and Proplatypygus Zaitzev).

== Genera and subgenera ==
According to Evenhuis (2024), Mythicomyiidae contains 35 genera, with a total of 467 species.

- Acridophagus Evenhuis, 1983
- Ahessea Greathead & Evenhuis, 2001
- Amydrostylus Lamas, Falaschi & Evenhuis, 2015
- †Borissovia Evenhuis, 2003
- †Carmenelectra Evenhuis, 2003
- Cephalodromia Becker, 1914
- Cyrtisiopsis Séguy, 1930
- Cyrtosia Perris, 1839
- Doliopteryx Hesse, 1938
- Elachymyia Hall & Evenhuis, 1987
- Empidideicus Becker, 1907
  - Anomaloptilus Hesse, 1938
  - Cyrtoides Engel, 1933
- †Eoacridophagus Myskowiak, Garrouste & Nel, 2016
- †Eurodoliopteryx Nel, 2006
- Glabellula Bezzi, 1902
- Glella Greathead & Evenhuis, 2001
- Hesychastes Evenhuis, 2002
- Heterhybos Brèthes, 1919
- Leylaiya Efflatoun, 1945
- †Microburmyia Grimaldi & Cumming, 2011
- Mitinha Rafael & Limeira-de-Oliveira, 2014
- Mnemomyia Bowden, 1975
- Mythenteles Hall & Evenhuis, 1986
- Mythicomyia Coquillett, 1893
- Nexus Hall & Evenhuis, 1987
- Onchopelma Hesse, 1938
- †Palaeoplatypygus Kovalev, 1985
- Paraconsors Hall & Evenhuis, 1987
- Pieza Evenhuis, 2002
- Platypygus Loew, 1844
- †Procyrtosia Zaitzev, 1986
- †Proplatypygus Hennig, 1969
- Pseudoglabellula Hesse, 1967
- Psiloderoides Hesse, 1967
- Reissa Evenhuis & Baéz, 2001
- †Riga Evenhuis, 2013
- Tamanduamyia Rafael & Limeira-de-Oliveira, 2014
- Zzyzzarro Evenhuis, 2022
