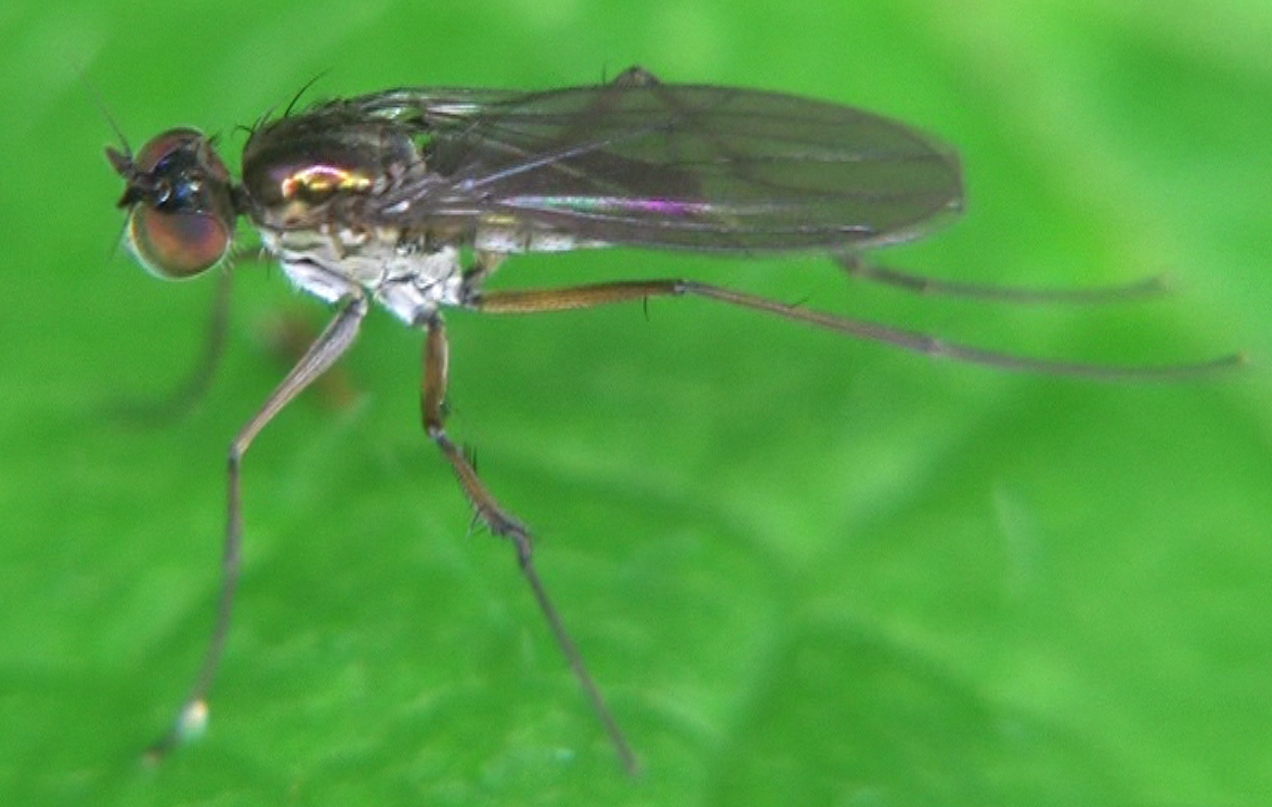
- Campsicnemus curvipes

Scientific classification
- Kingdom: Animalia
- Phylum: Arthropoda
- Clade: Pancrustacea
- Class: Insecta
- Order: Diptera
- Family: Dolichopodidae
- Subfamily: Sympycninae
- Genus: Campsicnemus; Haliday in Walker, 1851

Type species
- Dolichopus scambus Fallén, 1823

Synonyms
- Camptosceles Haliday, 1832 (name suppressed); Ectomus Mik, 1878; Emperoptera Grimshaw in Grimshaw & Speiser, 1902; Leptopezina Macquart, 1835 (nomen oblitum); Camptoscelus Kertész, 1909

= Campsicnemus =

Genus of flies

Campsicnemus is a genus of flies in family Dolichopodidae. There are more than 300 described species, a high number of which are endemic to Hawaii and French Polynesia – over 170 species are described from Hawaii, with an estimated 250–300 species. The genus also includes 39 Palearctic species, 22 Nearctic, seven Afrotropic, and three Indomalayan. Some species endemic to the Hawaiian islands are characterized by their lack of wings. After the introduction of invasive ants and other alien species such as wild boar (Sus scrofa) to the islands, some of these flightless species are believed extinct.

The generic name is derived from the Ancient Greek καμψις ("curve") and κνημη ("tibia"). This refers to the modified mid tibia of the males, a male secondary sexual character that is very distinct in Campsicnemus.

== Gallery ==
C. curvipes on leaf

== See also ==
- List of Campsicnemus species
