= Percy H. Grimshaw =

English entomologist and zoogeographer

Percy Hall Grimshaw ISO FRSE FERS (1869 in Leeds – 1939 in Edinburgh) was an English entomologist and zoogeographer. He was an expert on butterflies (Lepidoptera). He is also known for his work on Diptera.

== Life ==
He was born in Leeds the son of Emma and David Grimshaw.

He originally was in banking in Leeds.

In 1895 he accompanied William Eagle Clarke to Edinburgh to take on roles at the Royal Scottish Museum as an entomologist. From 1930 to 1935 he was Keeper of Natural History in the museum. He is known mainly for his work on Diptera.

In 1909 he was elected a Fellow of the Royal Society of Edinburgh. His proposers were Sir James Johnston Dobbie, John Horne, William Eagle Clarke and Ramsay Heatley Traquair.

He died in Edinburgh on 14 November 1939.

== Family ==
He was married to Jeannie Blair White.

== Works ==
partial list

- 1901 Diptera. p. l-77 Fauna Hawaiiensis and 1902 supplement with Paul Speiser
- 1911 Bartholomew, J.G., Clarke, W.E., Grimshaw, P.H. Atlas of Zoogeography. John Bartholomew and Co., Edinburgh.
- 1912 Clare Island Survey: A biological survey of Clare Island, Co. Mayo: Diptera Proceedings of the Royal Irish Academy, Vol. XXXI, Sect. 2, Part 25, pp. 1–34, December, 1912
