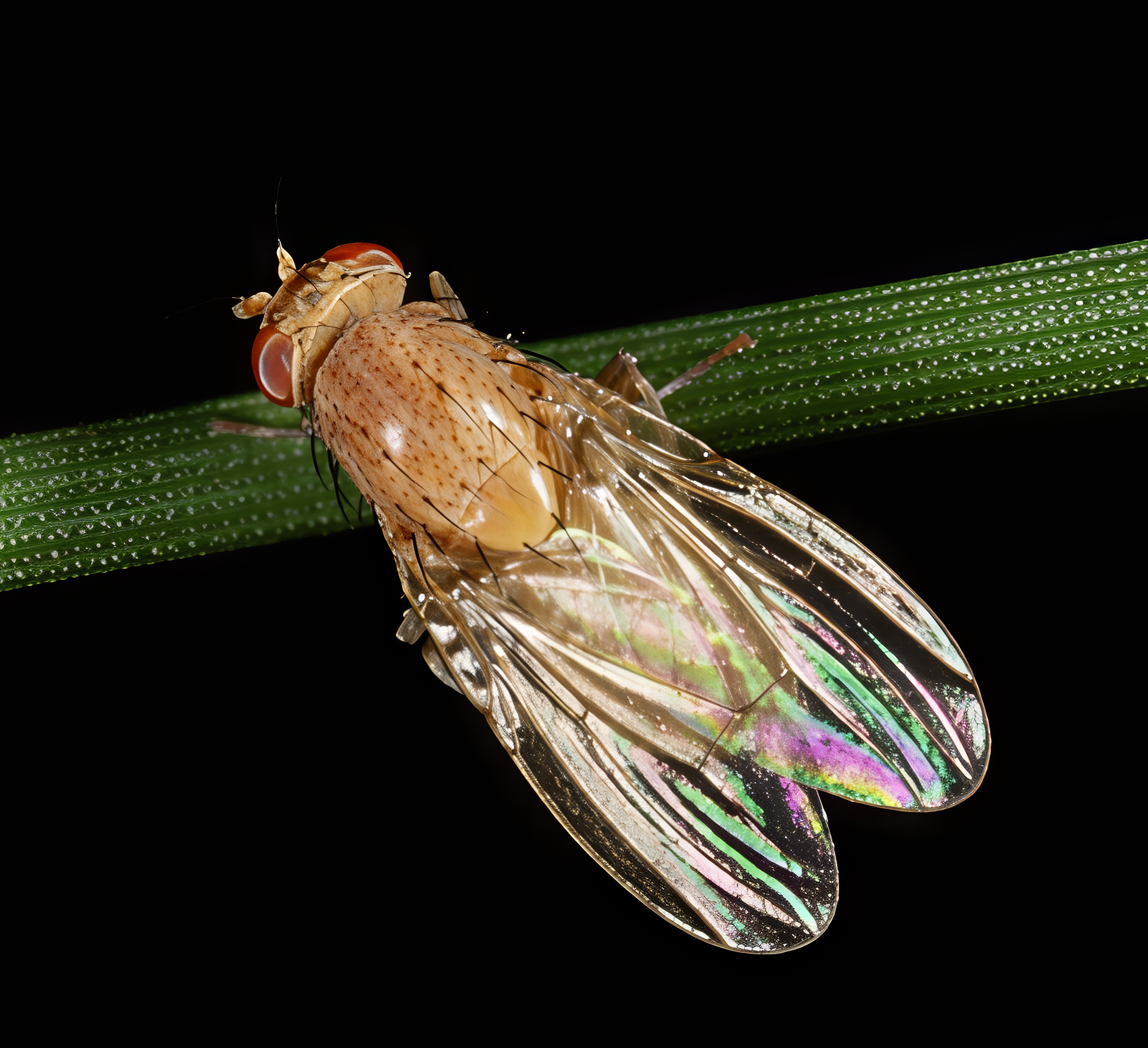
- Tricholauxania praeusta - dorsal view

Scientific classification
- Kingdom: Animalia
- Phylum: Arthropoda
- Clade: Pancrustacea
- Class: Insecta
- Order: Diptera
- Section: Schizophora
- Subsection: Acalyptratae
- Superfamily: Lauxanioidea; Hendel, 1922

Families
- Celyphidae - beetle-back flies; Chamaemyiidae - aphid flies; Lauxaniidae; Cremifaniidae

= Lauxanioidea =

Superfamily of flies

The Lauxanioidea are a superfamily of flies that includes the two large families, the Lauxaniidae and Chamaemyiidae, and the small family Celyphidae. Generally, they are small to medium, densely populated, coloured flies. The Chamaemyiidae live as parasites on insects. The family Celyphidae look like beetles.

Some authors also recognize the family Cremifaniidae, but most place this in the Chamaemyiidae.

== Description ==
The superfamily has three synapomorphies (features present in all members due to a common ancestor): convergent postocellar bristles, an abbreviated anal vein in the wing, and fusion of male abdominal tergites 7 and 8.

Within the superfamily, Celyphidae can be distinguished from other families by their scutellum, which is shiny, enlarged and covers most of the abdomen, similar to a beetle's elytra. Lauxaniidae are yellowish-brown or black, usually have iridescent reddish/purplish or greenish eyes, and the wings are sometimes patterned. Chamaemyiidae are usually silvery gray with black spots, sometimes shiny and black.

== Ecology ==
Larvae of most Lauxaniidae and Celyphidae feed on decaying vegetation. Some species of Lauxaniidae only occur in bird nests. Adult lauxaniids may visit flowers. Larvae of all known Chamaemyiidae have a rather different lifestyle, being predators of aphids and scale insects.

== Phylogeny ==
A 2017 phylogenetic analysis using mitochondrial genomes confirmed the monophyly of Lauxaniidae and of Celyphidae, and that these two families are sister groups.
