= Neal Evenhuis =

American entomologist

- Born: 16 April 1952 (age 74); Upland, California
- Education: California State Polytechnic University, Pomona
- Known for: Zoological nomenclature
- Awards: Thomas Say Award
- Scientific career
- Fields: Entomology
- Workplaces: Bishop Museum
- Author abbrev. (zoology): Evenhuis

Neal Luit Evenhuis (born Kornelus Luit Evenhuis on 16 April 1952) is an American entomologist. He works at the Bishop Museum in Hawaii. Evenhuis has described over 800 species of insects since 1976, and is known both for his research and peculiar binomial names.

== Education and career ==
Evenhuis was born in Southern California to parents who had immigrated to California from the Netherlands in 1938. In 1974, he received a Bachelor of Science degree in Botany and Entomology from California State Polytechnic University in Pomona. In 1976, he started working as a scientific illustrator at the Bernice Pauahi Bishop Museum. Two years later, he graduated with a Master's degree in Biology. Within a few years, he embarked on his own research by studying the taxonomy of Pacific flies. In 1988, he received a Ph.D. degree in Entomology at the University of Hawaiʻi at Mānoa and was soon promoted to full Entomologist. He has since described more than 800 new species of insects and authored more than 700 scientific publications, specializing in the families Bombyliidae and Mythicomyiidae. In 1992, he received the Thomas Say Award for his research by the Entomological Society of America. He is interested in the history of dipterology and nomenclature, and is a former president of the International Commission on Zoological Nomenclature. Evenhuis also campaigns for teaching school children to discern native species from alien species.

=== Taxonomy humor ===
In the entomological community, Evenhuis is also known for his sense of humor, and binomial names coined by him have attracted attention. After discovering a new species of bombyliid from the genus Phthiria in 1985, he decided to name it Phthiria relativitae as a pun on theory of relativity. To ensure publication of the name in a scientific journal and thus its acceptance while avoiding criticism of English-speaking scientists, he had to submit it to a Polish journal. In 2002, he named a genus of extinct mythicomyiids Carmenelectra in honour of the model Carmen Electra's "splendid" body. The same year, he described Pieza kake ("piece of cake"), Pieza pi ("pizza pie"), Pieza rhea ("pizzeria"), and Pieza deresistans ("pièce de résistance"), as well as Reissa roni (named after Rice-A-Roni). In 2013, he named a new species of fly from French Polynesia as Campsicnemus popeye for its resemblance with the cartoon character Popeye in having swollen forearms.

== Frisbee record ==
On 12 May 1980, he set a record for gridiron mini field goal distance in flying disc games, which he held for 20 years.

Professional and academic associations
Preceded by Alessandro Minelli	President of the International Commission on Zoological Nomenclature; 2001-2007	Succeeded by Jan van Tol
