= List of Sapromyza species =

This is a list of 339 species in Sapromyza, a genus of flies in the family Lauxaniidae.

== Sapromyza species ==
- Sapromyza abhorens Shatalkin, 1993^{c g}
- Sapromyza acrostichalis Sasakawa, 2001^{c g}
- Sapromyza adriani Baez, 2000^{c g}
- Sapromyza affra Rondani, 1863^{c g}
- Sapromyza afghanica Papp, 1979^{c g}
- Sapromyza agromyzina (Kertesz, 1913)^{c g}
- Sapromyza alazonica Shatalkin, 1993^{c g}
- Sapromyza albibasis Sasakawa, 1995^{c g}
- Sapromyza albiceps Fallén, 1820
- Sapromyza albicincta (Meijere, 1916)^{c g}
- Sapromyza albifacies Czerny, 1932^{c g}
- Sapromyza albipes Coquillett, 1904^{c g}
- Sapromyza albitarsis (Meigen, 1826)^{c g}
- Sapromyza alboatra Malloch, 1926^{c g}
- Sapromyza albuliceps Czerny, 1932
- Sapromyza alpina Merz, 2007^{c g}
- Sapromyza amabilis Frey, 1930
- Sapromyza amphibola Shatalkin, 1993^{c g}
- Sapromyza analis Macquart, 1846^{c g}
- Sapromyza annulifera Malloch, 1929^{c g}
- Sapromyza annulipes Macquart, 1851^{c g}
- Sapromyza antennata Becker, 1895^{c g}
- Sapromyza apicalis Loew, 1847
- Sapromyza appula (Walker, 1849)^{c g}
- Sapromyza arctophila Shatalkin, 1993^{c g}
- Sapromyza ardesiaca Shatalkin, 1993^{c g}
- Sapromyza arenaria Tonnoir & Malloch, 1926^{c g}
- Sapromyza argus Macquart, 1846^{c g}
- Sapromyza arkitana Shatalkin, 1999^{c g}
- Sapromyza atrimana Malloch, 1928^{c g}
- Sapromyza atripes (Meigen, 1838)^{c g}
- Sapromyza atrivena Shewell, 1971^{c g}
- Sapromyza aureocapitata Malloch, 1926^{c g}
- Sapromyza avicola Malloch, 1927^{c g}
- Sapromyza basalis Zetterstedt, 1847
- Sapromyza basipunctata Kertesz, 1900^{c g}
- Sapromyza beccarii Kertesz, 1900^{c g}
- Sapromyza beckeriana Baez, 2000^{c g}
- Sapromyza bergenstammi (Czerny, 1932)^{c g}
- Sapromyza bergi Shatalkin, 1993^{c g}
- Sapromyza binotata Macquart, 1835^{c g}
- Sapromyza biordinata Czerny, 1932^{c g}
- Sapromyza bipunctata Say, 1829^{c g}
- Sapromyza biscoitoi Baez, 2001^{c g}
- Sapromyza bisigillata Rondani, 1868
- Sapromyza blanchardi Malloch, 1933^{c g}
- Sapromyza brachysoma Coquillett, 1898^{i c g b}
- Sapromyza brasiliensis Walker, 1853^{c g}
- Sapromyza brunneovittata Malloch, 1926^{c g}
- Sapromyza brunnitarsis Macquart, 1835^{c g}
- Sapromyza cabrilsensis Carles-Tolra, 1993^{c g}
- Sapromyza caeruleophthalmica (Scopoli, 1763)^{c g}
- Sapromyza carinatula Shatalkin, 1992^{c g}
- Sapromyza cerata Shatalkin, 1996^{c g}
- Sapromyza chiloensis Malloch, 1933^{c g}
- Sapromyza chlorophthalma Zetterstedt, 1838^{c g}
- Sapromyza cincitventris Czerny, 1932^{c g}
- Sapromyza cinctipes (Meijere, 1910)^{c g}
- Sapromyza cinerea (Robineau-Desvoidy, 1830)^{c g}
- Sapromyza citrina Shatalkin, 1993^{c g}
- Sapromyza citrinella Shatalkin, 1996^{c g}
- Sapromyza claripennis (Robineau-Desvoidy, 1830)^{c g}
- Sapromyza clathrata Shatalkin, 1993^{c g}
- Sapromyza columbi Frey, 1936
- Sapromyza connexa (Say, 1829)^{c g}
- Sapromyza conspicua Malloch, 1929^{c g}
- Sapromyza ctenophora Sasakawa, 2001^{c g}
- Sapromyza cyclops Melander, 1913^{i c g}
- Sapromyza delicatula Blanchard, 1852^{c g}
- Sapromyza dichromata Walker, 1849^{c g}
- Sapromyza dichromocera Czerny, 1933^{c g}
- Sapromyza discontinua Bezzi, 1928^{c g}
- Sapromyza dispersa (Pandelle, 1902)^{c g}
- Sapromyza dorsalis Macquart, 1835^{c g}
- Sapromyza drahamensis Villeneuve, 1921^{c g}
- Sapromyza dubiella Evenhuis, 1989^{c g}
- Sapromyza duodecimvittata (Frey, 1918)^{c g}
- Sapromyza edwardsi Malloch, 1933^{c g}
- Sapromyza elegans Kertesz, 1900^{c g}
- Sapromyza emmesa Malloch, 1933^{c g}
- Sapromyza erimae Kertesz, 1900^{c g}
- Sapromyza eronis Curran, 1934^{c g}
- Sapromyza exul Williston, 1896^{c g}
- Sapromyza faciatifrons (Kertesz, 1913)^{g}
- Sapromyza fasciatifrons (Kertesz, 1913)^{c g}
- Sapromyza femoralis (Robineau-Desvoidy, 1830)^{c g}
- Sapromyza ferdinandi (Frey, 1919)^{c g}
- Sapromyza ferganica Shatalkin, 1996^{c g}
- Sapromyza ferruginea (Macquart, 1848)^{c g}
- Sapromyza flava (Robineau-Desvoidy, 1830)^{c}
- Sapromyza flavimana Malloch, 1926^{c g}
- Sapromyza flavipes (Robineau-Desvoidy, 1830)^{c g}
- Sapromyza flavodorsalis Malloch, 1927^{c g}
- Sapromyza flavopleura Malloch, 1927^{c g}
- Sapromyza freidbergi Yarom, 1990^{c g}
- Sapromyza frontalis Macquart, 1843^{c g}
- Sapromyza fulvicornis Malloch, 1933^{c g}
- Sapromyza fuscidula Shatalkin, 1993^{c g}
- Sapromyza fuscocostata Malloch, 1925^{c g}
- Sapromyza fuscolimbata Malloch, 1926^{c g}
- Sapromyza fuscotestacea Zetterstedt, 1849^{c g}
- Sapromyza geniculata Macquart, 1843^{c g}
- Sapromyza gestroi Kertesz, 1900^{c g}
- Sapromyza gibbosa Thomson, 1869^{c g}
- Sapromyza gomerensis Baez, 2000^{c g}
- Sapromyza gozmanyi Papp, 1981^{c g}
- Sapromyza griseadorsalis Malloch, 1926^{c g}
- Sapromyza grossipes (Robineau-Desvoidy, 1830)^{c g}
- Sapromyza guttulata Macquart, 1846^{c g}
- Sapromyza halidayi Shatalkin, 2000^{c g}
- Sapromyza hardii Lower, 1953^{c g}
- Sapromyza helomyzoides Becker, 1919^{c g}
- Sapromyza hermonensis Yarom, 1990^{c g}
- Sapromyza hieroglyphica Malloch, 1927^{c g}
- Sapromyza hierrensis Baez, 2000^{c g}
- Sapromyza hirtiloba Frey, 1949
- Sapromyza hissarica Shatalkin, 1996^{c g}
- Sapromyza hyalinata (Meigen, 1826)
- Sapromyza hyalipennis (Meijere, 1914)^{c g}
- Sapromyza hypocrita Kertesz, 1900^{c g}
- Sapromyza imitans Baez, 2001^{c g}
- Sapromyza immaculipes Malloch, 1926^{c g}
- Sapromyza impar Kertesz, 1900^{c g}
- Sapromyza impunctata (Robineau-Desvoidy, 1830)^{c g}
- Sapromyza incidens Curran, 1934^{c g}
- Sapromyza inconspicua Baez, 2001^{c g}
- Sapromyza indigena Becker, 1908
- Sapromyza infumata Becker, 1908
- Sapromyza ingrata Williston, 1896^{c g}
- Sapromyza innuba Giglio-Tos, 1893^{c g}
- Sapromyza insolita Shatalkin, 1993^{c g}
- Sapromyza insularis (Schiner, 1868)^{c g}
- Sapromyza interiecta Walker, 1849^{c g}
- Sapromyza interjecta (Walker, 1849)^{c}
- Sapromyza intonsa Loew, 1847
- Sapromyza intonsina Yarom, 1990^{c g}
- Sapromyza inversa Malloch, 1929^{c g}
- Sapromyza invertebrata Bezzi, 1928^{c g}
- Sapromyza israelis Yarom, 1990^{c g}
- Sapromyza kabuli Papp, 1979^{c g}
- Sapromyza krivosheinae Shatalkin, 1999^{c g}
- Sapromyza laevatrispina Carles-Tolra, 1992^{c g}
- Sapromyza lancifera Malloch, 1926^{c g}
- Sapromyza laszlopappi Merz, 2007^{c g}
- Sapromyza latelimbata Macquart, 1855^{c g}
- Sapromyza lateralis Walker, 1853^{c g}
- Sapromyza lateritia Rondani, 1863^{c g}
- Sapromyza laticincta Shatalkin, 1999^{c g}
- Sapromyza laurisilvae Baez, 2001^{c g}
- Sapromyza lebasii Macquart, 1843^{c g}
- Sapromyza leptoptera (Frey, 1919)^{c g}
- Sapromyza lichtwardti Malloch, 1930^{c g}
- Sapromyza limbinerva Rondani, 1848^{c g}
- Sapromyza lineata (Walker, 1853)^{c g}
- Sapromyza lineatocollis Blanchard, 1852^{c g}
- Sapromyza lineatus Williston, 1896^{c}
- Sapromyza longimentula Sasakawa, 2001^{c g}
- Sapromyza lopesi Shewell, 1989^{c g}
- Sapromyza lorentzi (Meijere, 1913)^{c g}
- Sapromyza loriae Kertesz, 1900^{c g}
- Sapromyza lupulinoides Williston, 1897^{c g}
- Sapromyza macrochaeta Shatalkin, 1999^{c g}
- Sapromyza maculipennis Loew, 1847^{c g}
- Sapromyza madeirensis Frey, 1949
- Sapromyza maghrebi Papp, 1981^{c g}
- Sapromyza magnifica Malloch, 1926^{c g}
- Sapromyza mallochi (Hendel, 1932)^{c g}
- Sapromyza mallochiana Evenhuis & Okadome, 1989^{c g}
- Sapromyza maquilingensis Malloch, 1929^{c g}
- Sapromyza marginalis (Walker, 1858)^{c g}
- Sapromyza mariae Malloch, 1927^{c g}
- Sapromyza mauli Baez, 2001^{c g}
- Sapromyza melanocephala (Kertesz, 1915)^{c g}
- Sapromyza melanura Zetterstedt, 1847^{c g}
- Sapromyza metallica Walker, 1853^{c g}
- Sapromyza micropyga Malloch, 1933^{c g}
- Sapromyza mikii Strobl, 1892
- Sapromyza minuta Kertesz, 1900^{c g}
- Sapromyza mollis (Robineau-Desvoidy, 1830)^{c g}
- Sapromyza mongolorum Remm & El'berg, 1980^{c g}
- Sapromyza monticola Melander, 1913^{i c g}
- Sapromyza montis Becker, 1914^{c g}
- Sapromyza morokana Kertesz, 1900^{c g}
- Sapromyza multimaculata Yarom, 1990^{c g}
- Sapromyza multiseriata Czerny, 1932
- Sapromyza neozelandica Tonnoir & Malloch, 1926
- Sapromyza nigerrima Becker, 1919^{c g}
- Sapromyza nigrans (Melander, 1913)^{i c g}
- Sapromyza nigriceps Macquart, 1851^{c g}
- Sapromyza nigricornis (Robineau-Desvoidy, 1830)^{c g}
- Sapromyza nigrifrontata Becker, 1919^{c g}
- Sapromyza nigripalpus (Walker, 1849)^{i c g}
- Sapromyza nigripes Macquart, 1843^{c g}
- Sapromyza nigriventris Blanchard, 1852^{c g}
- Sapromyza nigroapicata Malloch, 1926^{c g}
- Sapromyza nitida Czerny, 1932
- Sapromyza novempunctata Gimmerthal, 1847^{c g}
- Sapromyza nudiseta Shatalkin, 1999^{c g}
- Sapromyza nudiuscula Lamb, 1912^{c g}
- Sapromyza obesa Zetterstedt, 1847
- Sapromyza obscuripennis Loew, 1847^{c g}
- Sapromyza obsoleta Fallén, 1820
- Sapromyza obsuripennis Loew, 1847
- Sapromyza occipitalis Malloch, 1926^{c g}
- Sapromyza octopuncta Wiedemann, 1830^{c g}
- Sapromyza oestrachion Schiner, 1868^{c g}
- Sapromyza ombriosa Baez, 2000^{c g}
- Sapromyza opaca Becker, 1895
- Sapromyza ornata Schiner, 1868^{c g}
- Sapromyza pallens Blanchard, 1852^{c g}
- Sapromyza pallida Fallen, 1820^{c g}
- Sapromyza pallidicornis Loew, 1857^{c g}
- Sapromyza palmensis Baez, 2000^{c g}
- Sapromyza palpella Rondani, 1868
- Sapromyza palustris (Robineau-Desvoidy, 1830)^{c g}
- Sapromyza parallela Carles-Tolra, 1992^{c g}
- Sapromyza paramerata Shatalkin, 1993^{c g}
- Sapromyza parviceps Malloch, 1926^{c g}
- Sapromyza parvula Blanchard, 1852^{c g}
- Sapromyza pellopleura Sasakawa, 2001^{c g}
- Sapromyza persica Shatalkin, 1996^{c g}
- Sapromyza persimillima Harrison, 1959^{c g}
- Sapromyza peterseni Malloch, 1927^{c g}
- Sapromyza picea Shatalkin, 1996^{c g}
- Sapromyza picrula Williston, 1897^{c g}
- Sapromyza picticornis (Curran, 1942)^{c g}
- Sapromyza pictigera Malloch, 1935^{c g}
- Sapromyza pilifrons Malloch, 1926^{c g}
- Sapromyza pistaciphila Shatalkin, 1993^{c g}
- Sapromyza placida Meigen, 1830^{c g}
- Sapromyza plana (Curran, 1942)^{c g}
- Sapromyza plantaris Thomson, 1869^{c g}
- Sapromyza pleuralis (Kertesz, 1913)^{c g}
- Sapromyza plumiseta Malloch, 1927^{c g}
- Sapromyza poecilogastra (Meijere, 1916)^{c g}
- Sapromyza pollinifrons Malloch, 1927^{c g}
- Sapromyza pseudohyalinata Papp, 2004^{c g}
- Sapromyza pseudopaca Shatalkin, 1993^{c g}
- Sapromyza pseudovirilis Shewell, 1971^{c g}
- Sapromyza puella Williston, 1896^{c g}
- Sapromyza pulchripennis Kertesz, 1900^{c g}
- Sapromyza punctata (Robineau-Desvoidy, 1830)^{c g}
- Sapromyza punctigera (Doleschall, 1858)^{g}
- Sapromyza punctiseta Malloch, 1925^{c g}
- Sapromyza punctulata Kertesz, 1900^{c g}
- Sapromyza pusillima (Meijere, 1914)^{c g}
- Sapromyza quadrangulata (Meijere, 1924)^{c g}
- Sapromyza quadrata Bezzi, 1908^{c g}
- Sapromyza quadricincta Becker, 1895^{c g}
- Sapromyza quadridentata Sasakawa, 2001^{c g}
- Sapromyza quadripunctata (Linnaeus, 1767)^{c g}
- Sapromyza quadristrigata Kertesz, 1900^{c g}
- Sapromyza quichuana Brèthes, 1922^{c g}
- Sapromyza quinquepunctata Kertesz, 1900^{c g}
- Sapromyza quyanensis Macquart, 1843^{c g}
- Sapromyza ratzii Kertesz, 1900^{c g}
- Sapromyza ravida Shatalkin, 1996^{c g}
- Sapromyza recurrens (Meijere, 1913)^{c g}
- Sapromyza regalis Malloch, 1926^{c g}
- Sapromyza remmae Shatalkin, 1996^{c g}
- Sapromyza remota Thomson, 1869^{c g}
- Sapromyza rhodesiella Curran, 1938^{c g}
- Sapromyza ringens Loew, 1862^{c g}
- Sapromyza riparia Malloch, 1927^{c g}
- Sapromyza roberti Meigen, 1838^{c g}
- Sapromyza romanovi Shatalkin, 1996^{c g}
- Sapromyza rotundicornis Loew, 1863^{i c g b}
- Sapromyza rubescens Macquart, 1843^{c g}
- Sapromyza rubricornis Becker, 1907^{c g}
- Sapromyza rufifrons (Walker, 1853)^{c g}
- Sapromyza schnabli Papp, 1987^{c g}
- Sapromyza schwarzi Malloch, 1928^{c g}
- Sapromyza sciomyzina Schiner, 1868^{c g}
- Sapromyza scutellaris (Williston, 1896)^{c g}
- Sapromyza semiatra Malloch, 1933^{c g}
- Sapromyza septemnotata Sasakawa, 2001^{c g}
- Sapromyza setiventris Zetterstedt, 1847
- Sapromyza setosa Thomson, 1869^{c g}
- Sapromyza sexlituris Shatalkin, 1993^{c g}
- Sapromyza sexmaculata Sasakawa, 2001^{c g}
- Sapromyza sexnotata Zetterstedt, 1847^{c g}
- Sapromyza sexpunctata Meigen, 1826
- Sapromyza shannoni Malloch, 1933^{c g}
- Sapromyza shewelli Evenhuis, 1989^{c g}
- Sapromyza sicca Becker, 1914^{c g}
- Sapromyza simillima Tonnoir & Malloch, 1926^{c g}
- Sapromyza simplicior Hendel, 1908
- Sapromyza simplicipes Czerny, 1932^{c g}
- Sapromyza sonax Giglio-Tos, 1893^{c g}
- Sapromyza sordida Haliday, 1833^{c g}
- Sapromyza sororia Williston, 1896^{i c g}
- Sapromyza sorosia Williston, 1896^{c g}
- Sapromyza speciosa Remm & El'berg, 1980^{c g}
- Sapromyza spinigera Malloch, 1933^{c g}
- Sapromyza stata Giglio-Tos, 1893^{c g}
- Sapromyza stigmatica Malloch, 1926^{c g}
- Sapromyza strahani Malloch, 1927^{c g}
- Sapromyza strigillifera Shatalkin, 1993^{c g}
- Sapromyza stroblii Kertesz, 1900^{c g}
- Sapromyza suavis Loew, 1847^{c g}
- Sapromyza suffusa Malloch, 1926^{c g}
- Sapromyza takagii Elberg, 1993^{c g}
- Sapromyza talyshensis Shatalkin, 1999^{c g}
- Sapromyza tarsella Zetterstedt, 1847^{c g}
- Sapromyza tenebricosa Lindner, 1956^{c g}
- Sapromyza teneriffensis Frey, 1936
- Sapromyza ternatensis Kertesz, 1900^{c g}
- Sapromyza thoracica (Robineau-Desvoidy, 1830)^{c g}
- Sapromyza tinguarrae Frey, 1936
- Sapromyza tonnoiri Malloch, 1927^{c g}
- Sapromyza transcaspica Shatalkin, 2000^{c g}
- Sapromyza transcaucasica Czerny, 1932^{c g}
- Sapromyza transformata Becker, 1908
- Sapromyza triloba Malloch, 1933^{c g}
- Sapromyza trinotata Costa, 1844^{c g}
- Sapromyza triseriata Coquillett, 1904^{c g}
- Sapromyza tuberculosa Becker, 1895
- Sapromyza ultima Baez, 2001^{c g}
- Sapromyza umbraculata (Robineau-Desvoidy, 1830)^{c g}
- Sapromyza undulata Merz, 2007^{c g}
- Sapromyza unicolorata Malloch, 1926^{c g}
- Sapromyza unizona Hendel, 1908
- Sapromyza urbana Malloch, 1927^{c g}
- Sapromyza variventris Malloch, 1926^{c g}
- Sapromyza venusta Williston, 1896^{c g}
- Sapromyza verena Becker, 1919^{c g}
- Sapromyza viciespunctata Czerny, 1932
- Sapromyza vicina Meijere, 1907^{c g}
- Sapromyza vicispunctata Czerny, 1932^{c g}
- Sapromyza victoriae Malloch, 1925^{c g}
- Sapromyza vinnula Giglio-Tos, 1893^{c g}
- Sapromyza virescens (Macquart, 1851)^{c g}
- Sapromyza vittata (Frey, 1917)^{c g}
- Sapromyza vumbella Curran, 1938^{c g}
- Sapromyza xanthiceps Williston, 1897^{c g}
- Sapromyza xenia Malloch, 1935^{c g}
- Sapromyza zebra (Kertesz, 1913)^{c g}
- Sapromyza zetterstedti Hendel, 1908
- Sapromyza ziminae Shatalkin, 1996^{c g}
- Sapromyza zlobini Shatalkin, 1999^{c g}

Data sources: i = ITIS, c = Catalogue of Life, g = GBIF, b = Bugguide.net
