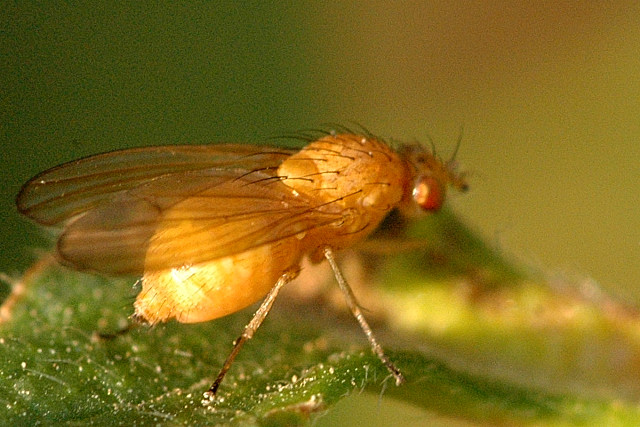
- Sapromyza (Sapromyzosoma) quadricincta female

Scientific classification
- Kingdom: Animalia
- Phylum: Arthropoda
- Clade: Pancrustacea
- Class: Insecta
- Order: Diptera
- Family: Lauxaniidae
- Genus: Sapromyza
- Subgenus: Sapromyzosoma; Lioy, 1864

Type species
- Musca quadripunctata Linnaeus, 1767

Species
- See text

= Sapromyzosoma =

Subgenus of flies

Sapromyzosoma is a subgenus of small flies of the family Lauxaniidae.

== Species ==
- S. cabrilensis Carles-Torla, 1993
- S. drahamensis Villeneuve, 1921
- S. israelis Yarom, 1990
- S. laevatrispina Carles-Tolra, 1992
- S. maghrebi Papp, 1981
- S. parallela Carles-Tolra, 1992
- S. quadricincta Becker, 1895
- S. quadripunctata (Linnaeus, 1767)
- S. senilis Meigen, 1826
- S. talyshensis Shatalkin, 1998
