= Sapromyza rotundicornis =

Scientific classification
- Kingdom: Animalia
- Phylum: Arthropoda
- Class: Insecta
- Order: Diptera
- Family: Lauxaniidae
- Genus: Sapromyza
- Species: S. rotundicornis

Binomial name
- Sapromyza rotundicornis Loew, 1863

Species of fly

Sapromyza rotundicornis is a species of fly in the family Lauxaniidae.
