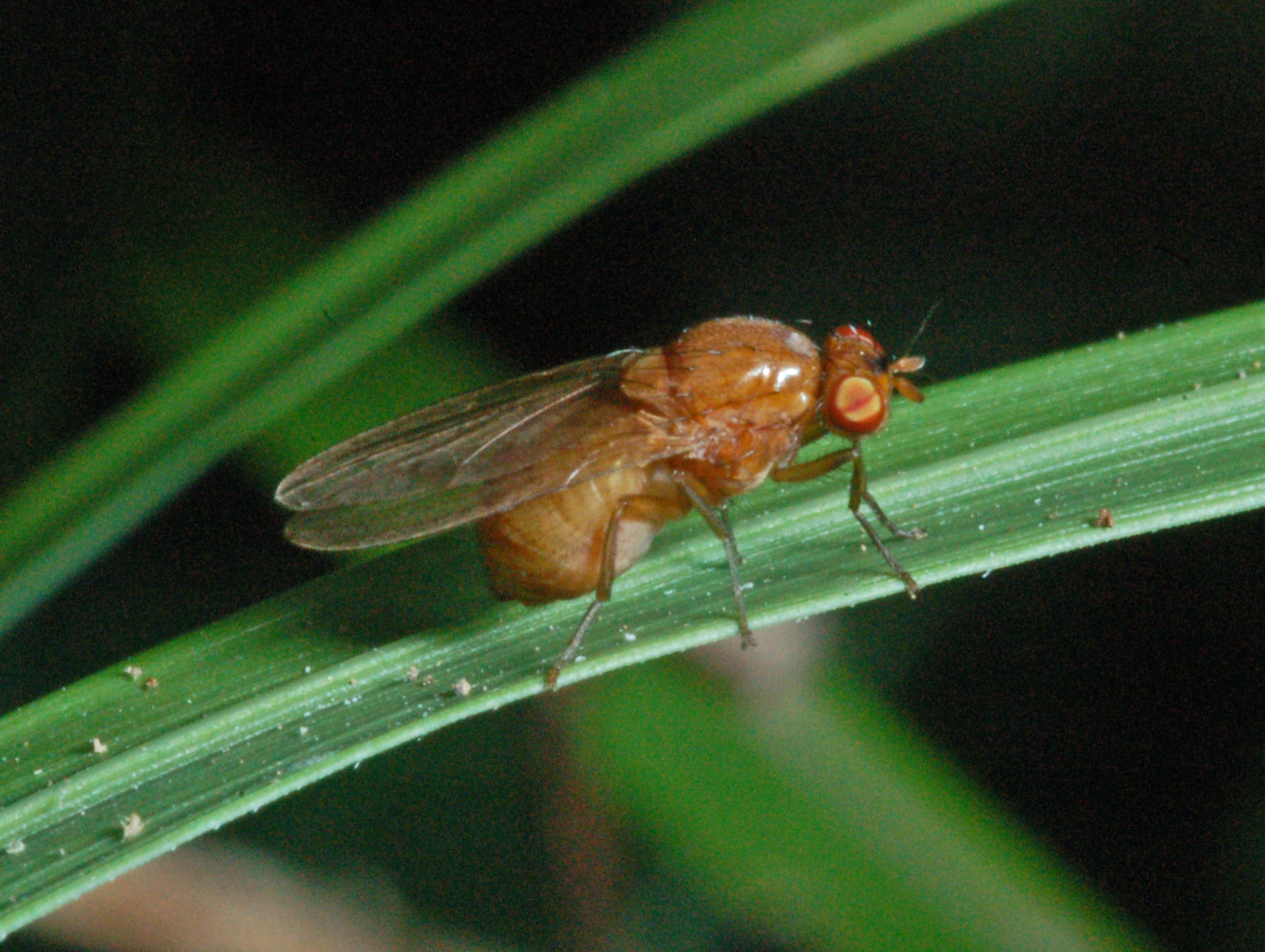
- Sapromyza cf. halidayi

Scientific classification
- Kingdom: Animalia
- Phylum: Arthropoda
- Class: Insecta
- Order: Diptera
- Family: Lauxaniidae
- Genus: Sapromyza
- Species: S. halidayi

Binomial name
- Sapromyza halidayi Shatalkin, 2000

Synonyms
- Sapromyza sordida Haliday, 1833

= Sapromyza halidayi =

Species of fly

Sapromyza halidayi is a species of small flies of the family Lauxaniidae.

This small fly reaches a length of 4–5 millimetres (0.16–0.20 in). The basic color is reddish-orange. The front femora has dark tips.
