= Sapromyza oestrachion =

Scientific classification
- Kingdom: Animalia
- Phylum: Arthropoda
- Class: Insecta
- Order: Diptera
- Family: Lauxaniidae
- Genus: Sapromyza
- Species: S. oestrachion

Binomial name
- Sapromyza oestrachion Schiner, 1868

Species of fly

Sapromyza oestrachion is a species of small flies of the family Lauxaniidae.
