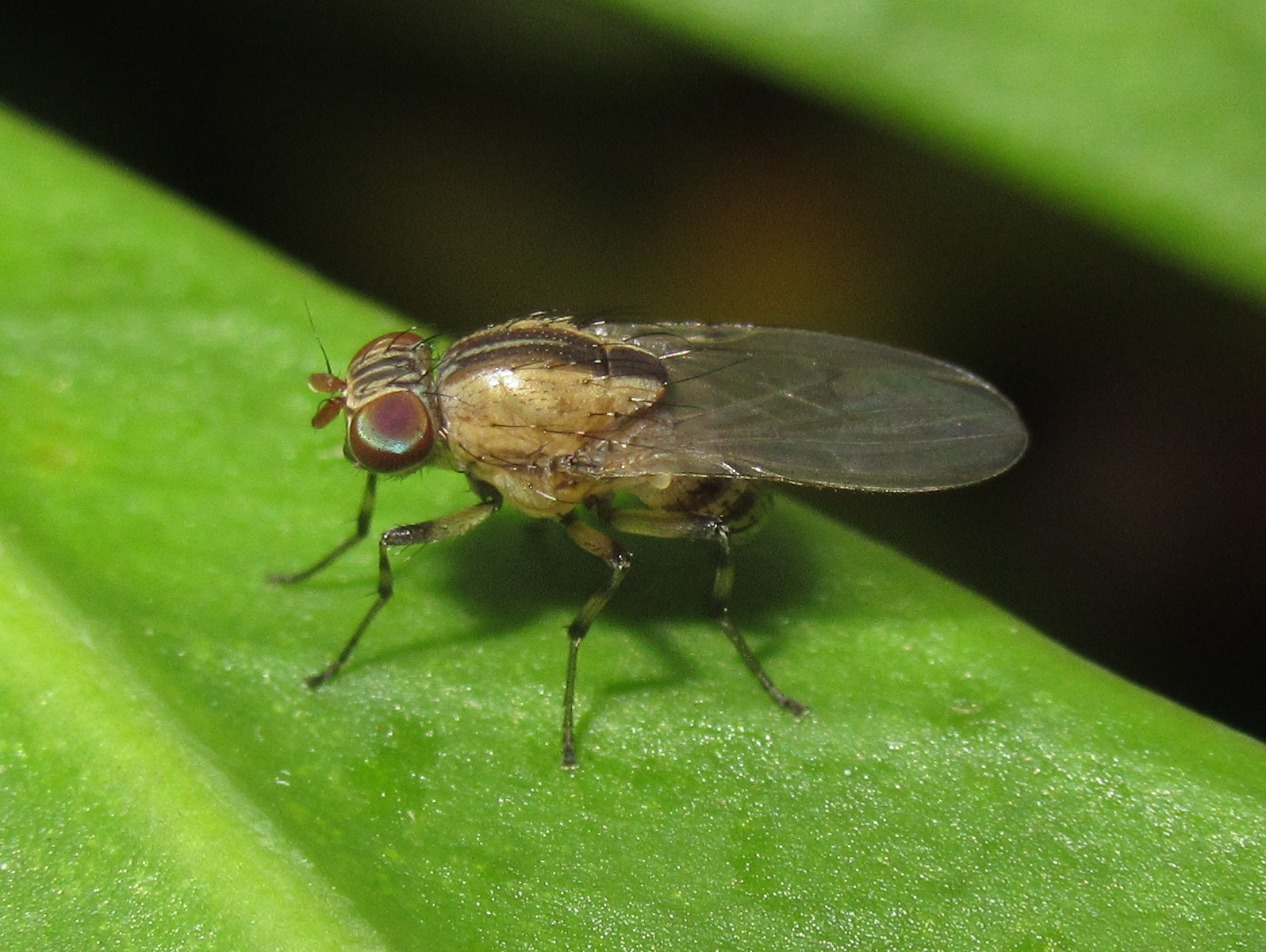

Scientific classification
- Kingdom: Animalia
- Phylum: Arthropoda
- Class: Insecta
- Order: Diptera
- Family: Lauxaniidae
- Genus: Sapromyza
- Species: S. neozelandica

Binomial name
- Sapromyza neozelandica Tonnoir & Malloch, 1926

= Sapromyza neozelandica =

Species of fly

Sapromyza neozelandica, commonly called the brown striped litter fly, is an endemic fly of New Zealand.

A small red-eyed fly that lives in forest or areas of scrub usually in damp and shaded places. S. neozelandica maggots live amongst leaf litter and feed off moulds.
