= Sapromyza brachysoma =

Scientific classification
- Kingdom: Animalia
- Phylum: Arthropoda
- Class: Insecta
- Order: Diptera
- Family: Lauxaniidae
- Genus: Sapromyza
- Species: S. brachysoma

Binomial name
- Sapromyza brachysoma Coquillett, 1898

Synonyms
- Sapromyza fusca Shewell, 1938

Species of fly

Sapromyza brachysoma is a species of fly in the family Lauxaniidae.
