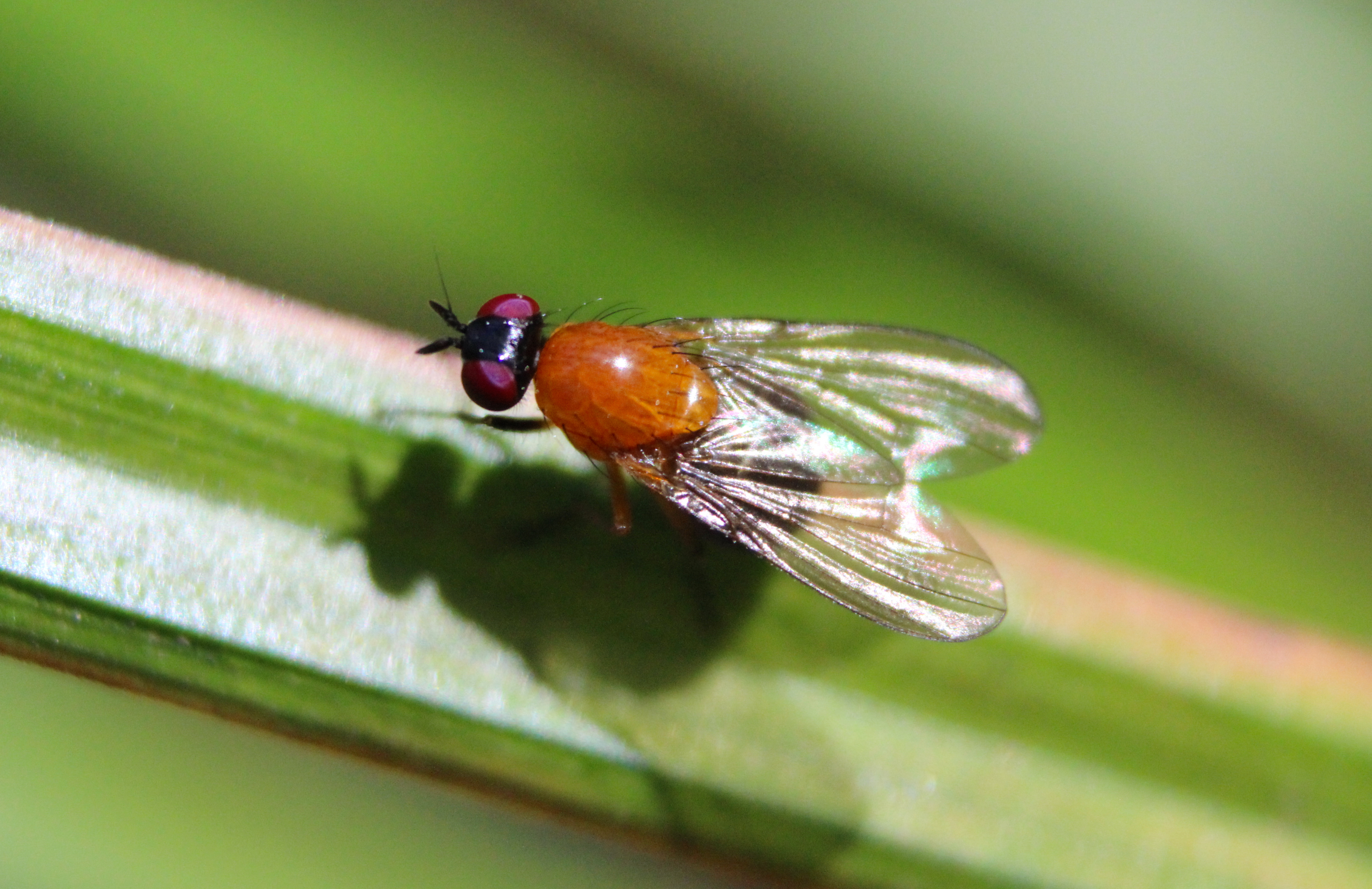

Scientific classification
- Kingdom: Animalia
- Phylum: Arthropoda
- Clade: Pancrustacea
- Class: Insecta
- Order: Diptera
- Family: Lauxaniidae
- Genus: Sapromyza
- Species: S. sciomyzina

Binomial name
- Sapromyza sciomyzina Schiner, 1868

= Sapromyza sciomyzina =

Species of fly

Sapromyza sciomyzina is a species of fly found in Australia.
