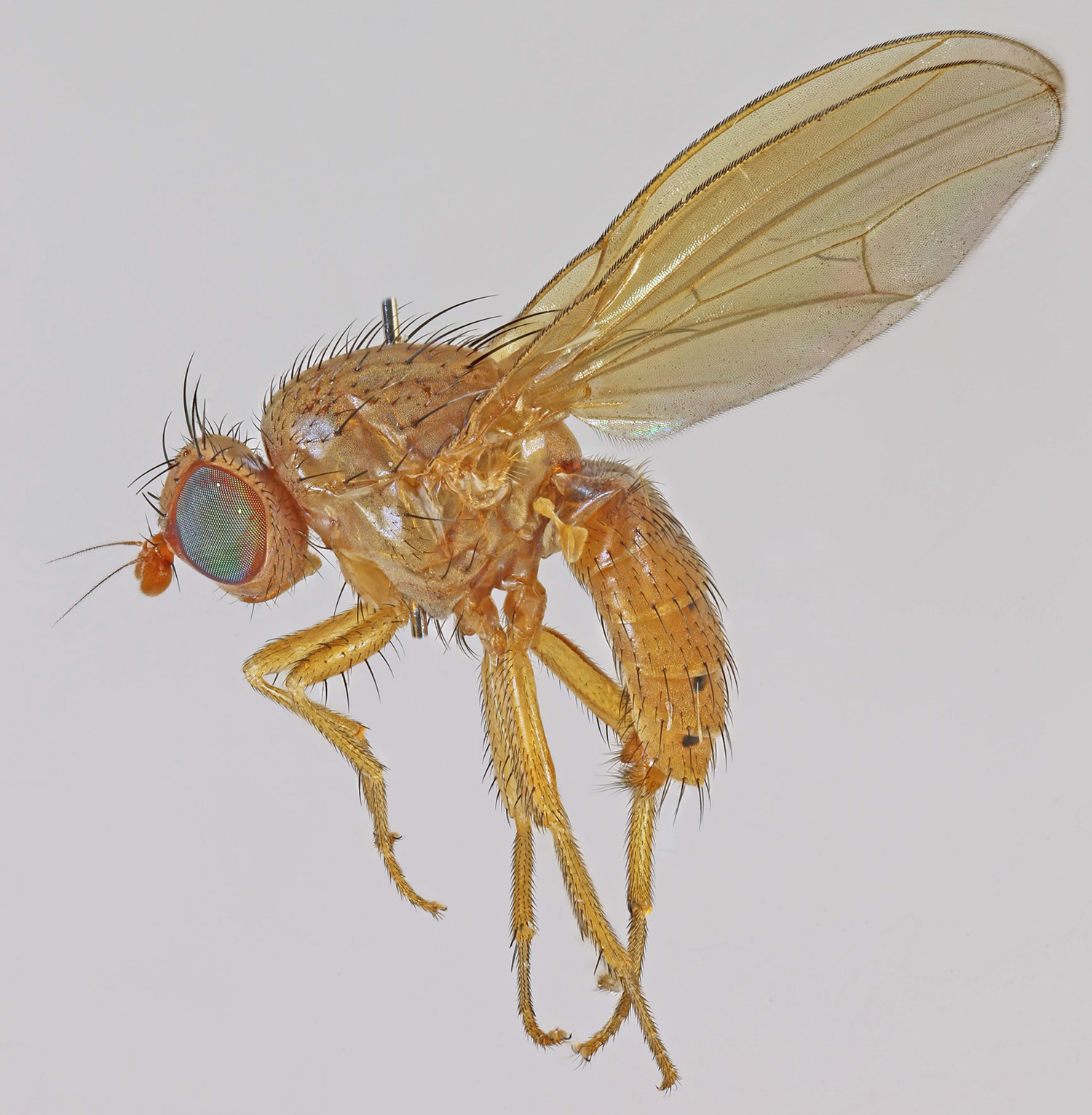
- Sapromyza quadripunctata North Wales

Scientific classification
- Kingdom: Animalia
- Phylum: Arthropoda
- Class: Insecta
- Order: Diptera
- Family: Lauxaniidae
- Genus: Sapromyza
- Species: S. quadripunctata

Binomial name
- Sapromyza quadripunctata (Linnaeus, 1767)

= Sapromyza quadripunctata =

Species of fly

Sapromyza quadripunctata is a species of fly in the family Lauxaniidae. It is found in the Palearctic.
