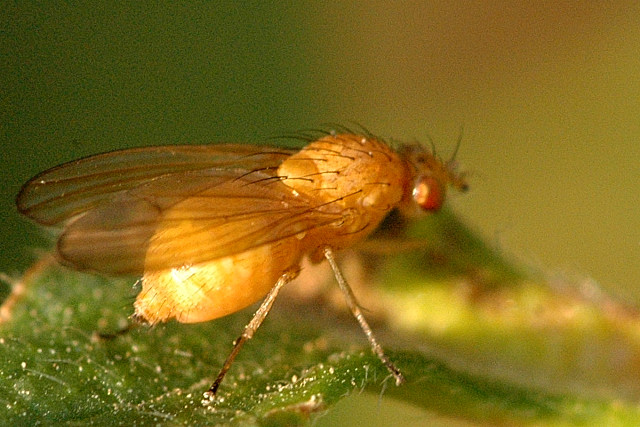
- Sapromyza quadricincta female

Scientific classification
- Kingdom: Animalia
- Phylum: Arthropoda
- Class: Insecta
- Order: Diptera
- Family: Lauxaniidae
- Genus: Sapromyza
- Species: S. quadricincta

Binomial name
- Sapromyza quadricincta Becker, 1895

= Sapromyza quadricincta =

Species of fly

Sapromyza quadricincta, is a species of small flies of the family Lauxaniidae present in Europe.
