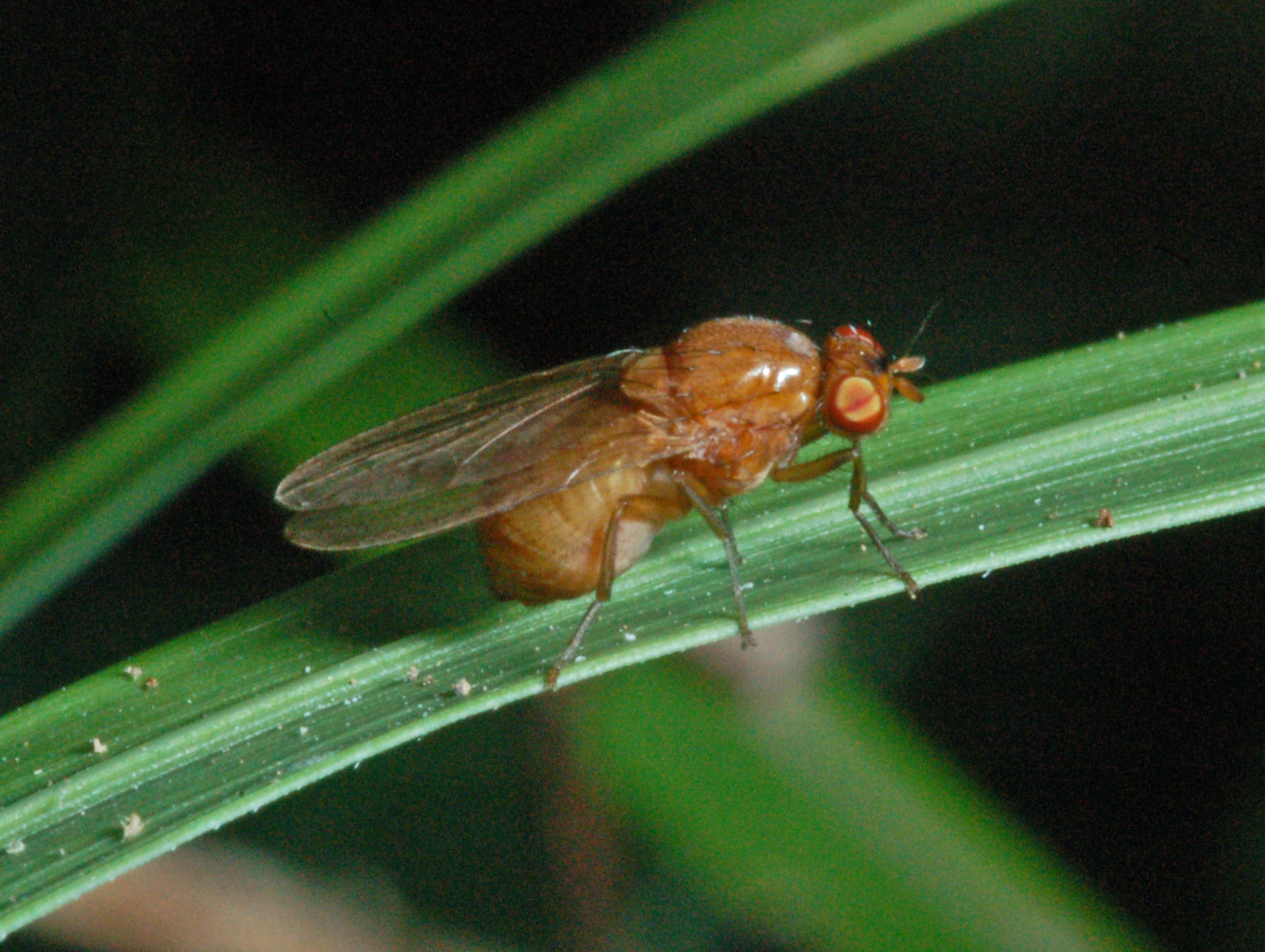
- Sapromyza halidayi

Scientific classification
- Domain: Eukaryota
- Kingdom: Animalia
- Phylum: Arthropoda
- Class: Insecta
- Order: Diptera
- Family: Lauxaniidae
- Subfamily: Lauxaniinae
- Genus: Sapromyza; Fallén, 1810

Subgenera
- Nannomyza Freay, 1941; Sapromyza Fallén, 1810; Sapromyzosoma Lioy, 1864; Schumannimyia Papp, 1978

Diversity
- at least 330 species

Synonyms
- Paralauxania Hendel, 1908

= Sapromyza =

Genus of insects

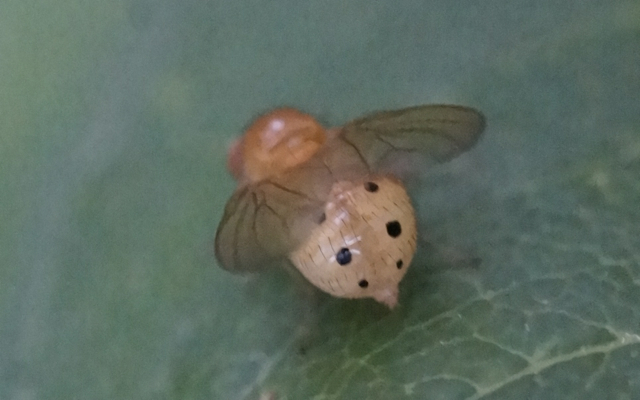
Sapromyza sexpunctata

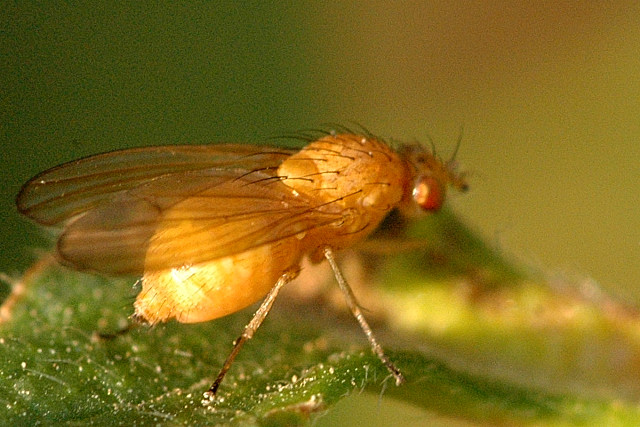
Sapromyza (Sapromyzosoma) quadricincta female

Sapromyza is a genus of small flies of the family Lauxaniidae. There are at least 330 described species in Sapromyza.

== See also ==
- List of Sapromyza species
