= List of Minettia species =

This is a list of 122 species in Minettia, a genus of flies in the family Lauxaniidae.

== Minettia species ==
- Minettia aberrans (Malloch, 1925)^{c g}
- Minettia acuminata Sasakawa, 1985^{c g}
- Minettia albibasis Malloch, 1933^{c g}
- Minettia albomarginata Malloch, 1933^{c g}
- Minettia albonito Curran, 1926^{c g}
- Minettia americanella Shewell, 1938^{i c g}
- Minettia andalusiaca (Strobl, 1899)^{c g}
- Minettia argentiventris Malloch, 1928^{c g}
- Minettia assimilis Malloch, 1926^{c g}
- Minettia atrata (Meijere, 1910)^{c g}
- Minettia atratula (Meijere, 1924)^{c g}
- Minettia austriaca Hennig, 1951^{c g}
- Minettia biseriata (Loew, 1847)^{c g}
- Minettia buchanani Malloch, 1924^{i c g}
- Minettia bulgarica Papp, 1981^{c g}
- Minettia caesia (Coquillett, 1904)^{i c g b}
- Minettia cana Melander, 1913^{i c g}
- Minettia cantolraensis Carles-Tolra, 1998^{c g}
- Minettia caucasica Shatalkin, 1998^{c g}
- Minettia centralis Malloch, 1933^{c g}
- Minettia chilensis (Schiner, 1868)^{c g}
- Minettia coracina Shatalkin, 1993^{c g}
- Minettia crassulata Shatalkin, 1998^{c g}
- Minettia cypriota Papp, 1981^{c g}
- Minettia czernyi Freidberg, 1990^{c g}
- Minettia dedecor (Loew, 1873)^{c g}
- Minettia desmometopa (de Meijere, 1907)^{g}
- Minettia dichroa Malloch, 1933^{c g}
- Minettia dissimilis Collin, 1966^{c g}
- Minettia divaricata Sasakawa, 1985^{c g}
- Minettia duplicata (Lynch Arribalzaga, 1893)^{c g}
- Minettia elbergi Shatalkin, 1996^{c g}
- Minettia eoa Shatalkin, 1992^{c g}
- Minettia evittata Malloch, 1926^{c g}
- Minettia fasciata (Fallén, 1826 )^{c g b}
- Minettia filia (Becker, 1895)^{c g}
- Minettia filippovi Shatalkin, 1998^{c g}
- Minettia flaveola (Coquillett, 1898)^{i c g b}
- Minettia flavipalpis (Loew, 1847)^{c g}
- Minettia flaviventris (Costa, 1844)^{c g}
- Minettia fulvicornis Malloch, 1933^{c g}
- Minettia fumipennis Melander, 1913^{i c g}
- Minettia fuscescens Shatalkin, 1998^{c g}
- Minettia fuscofasciata (Meijere, 1910)^{c g}
- Minettia galil Freidberg, 1991^{c g}
- Minettia gemina Shatalkin, 1992^{c g}
- Minettia gemmata Shatalkin, 1992^{c g}
- Minettia glauca (Coquillett, 1902)^{i c g}
- Minettia graeca Papp, 1981^{c g}
- Minettia helva Czerny, 1932^{c g}
- Minettia helvola (Becker, 1895)^{c g}
- Minettia hoozanensis Malloch, 1927^{g}
- Minettia hoozanesis Malloch, 1927^{c g}
- Minettia hubbardii (Coquillett, 1898)^{i c g}
- Minettia hyrcanica Shatalkin, 1999^{c g}
- Minettia ignobilis Malloch, 1933^{c g}
- Minettia imparispinosa Sasakawa, 2001^{c g}
- Minettia infraseta Malloch, 1933^{c g}
- Minettia infuscata Malloch, 1928^{c g}
- Minettia inusta (Meigen, 1826)^{c g}
- Minettia japonica Sasakawa, 1995^{c g}
- Minettia kimi Sasakawa & Kozanek, 1995^{c g}
- Minettia kunashirica Shatalkin, 1992^{c g}
- Minettia linguifera Sasakawa & Kozanek, 1995^{c g}
- Minettia lobata Shewell, 1938^{i c g b}
- Minettia loewi (Schiner, 1864)^{g}
- Minettia longipennis (Fabricius, 1794)^{c g}
- Minettia longiseta (Loew, 1847)^{c g}
- Minettia longistylis Sasakawa, 2002^{c g}
- Minettia lupulina (Fabricius, 1787)^{i c g b}
- Minettia luteitarsis (Meijere, 1916)^{c g}
- Minettia lyraformis Shewell, 1938^{i c g}
- Minettia maculithorax (Malloch, 1926)^{c g}
- Minettia magna (Coquillett, 1898)^{i c g b}
- Minettia martineki Ceianu, 1991^{c g}
- Minettia maura (Walker, 1853)^{c g}
- Minettia mona Curran, 1926^{c g}
- Minettia multisetosa (Kertesz, 1915)^{c g}
- Minettia muricata (Becker, 1895)^{c g}
- Minettia nigritarsis Shatalkin, 1998^{c g}
- Minettia nigriventris (Czerny, 1932)^{c g}
- Minettia nigrohalterata Malloch, 1927^{c g}
- Minettia nigropunctata Malloch, 1928^{c g}
- Minettia nitidiventris Malloch, 1935^{c g}
- Minettia obscura (Loew, 1861)^{i c g}
- Minettia obscurata Shewell, 1977^{c g}
- Minettia omei Shatalkin, 1998^{c g}
- Minettia palaestinensis Papp, 1981^{c g}
- Minettia philippinensis Malloch, 1929^{c g}
- Minettia pirioni Malloch, 1933^{c g}
- Minettia plumicheta (Rondani, 1868)^{c g}
- Minettia plumicornis (Fallen, 1820)^{c g}
- Minettia punctata Sasakawa, 1985^{c g}
- Minettia punctiventris (Rondani, 1868)^{c g}
- Minettia quadrisetosa (Becker, 1907)^{c g}
- Minettia quadrispinosa Malloch, 1927^{c g}
- Minettia rivosa (Meigen, 1826)^{i}
- Minettia rufiventris (Macquart, 1848)^{c}
- Minettia ryukyuensis Sasakawa, 2002^{c g}
- Minettia sasakawai Shi, Wang & Yang, 2011^{g}
- Minettia sbitinctiventris Papp, 1981^{c g}
- Minettia semifulva Malloch, 1933^{c g}
- Minettia seminigra Malloch, 1933^{c g}
- Minettia shewelli Steyskal, 1971^{i c g b}
- Minettia styriaca (Strobl, 1892)^{c g}
- Minettia subtinctiventris Papp, 1981^{c g}
- Minettia subvittata (Loew, 1847)^{c g}
- Minettia suillorum (Robineau-Desvoidy, 1830)^{c g}
- Minettia tabidiventris (Papp, 1877)^{c g}
- Minettia tarsata Sasakawa & Kozanek, 1995^{c g}
- Minettia tenebrica Shatalkin, 1992^{c g}
- Minettia tetrachaeta (Loew, 1873)^{c g}
- Minettia thomsoni (Lynch Arribalzaga, 1893)^{c g}
- Minettia tinctiventris (Rondani, 1868)^{c g}
- Minettia tubifer (Meigen, 1826)^{c g}
- Minettia tubifera Malloch, 1927^{c g}
- Minettia tucumanensis Malloch, 1928^{c g}
- Minettia tunisica Papp, 1981^{c g}
- Minettia univittata (Coquillett, 1904)^{i c g}
- Minettia verticalis Malloch, 1928^{c g}
- Minettia vockerothi Sasakawa, 1998^{c g}
- Minettia zuercheri (Hendel, 1933)^{c g}

Data sources: i = ITIS, c = Catalogue of Life, g = GBIF, b = Bugguide.net
