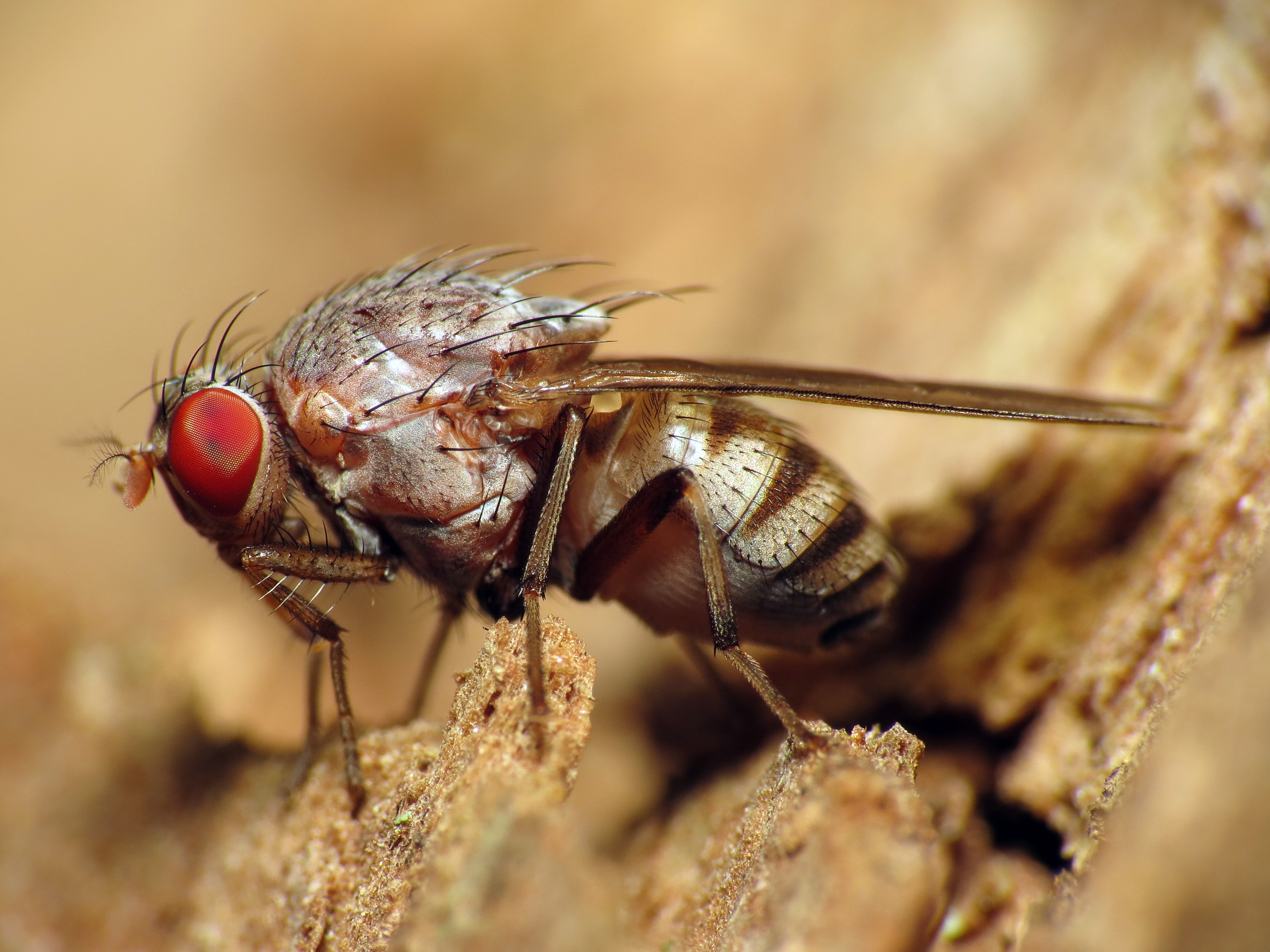

Scientific classification
- Domain: Eukaryota
- Kingdom: Animalia
- Phylum: Arthropoda
- Class: Insecta
- Order: Diptera
- Family: Lauxaniidae
- Genus: Minettia
- Species: M. magna

Binomial name
- Minettia magna (Coquillett, 1898)

Synonyms
- Sapromyza magna Coquillett, 1898

= Minettia magna =

Species of fly

Minettia magna is a species of fly in the family Lauxaniidae.
