= Minettia shewelli =

Scientific classification
- Domain: Eukaryota
- Kingdom: Animalia
- Phylum: Arthropoda
- Class: Insecta
- Order: Diptera
- Family: Lauxaniidae
- Genus: Minettia
- Species: M. shewelli

Binomial name
- Minettia shewelli Steyskal, 1971

Species of fly

Minettia shewelli is a species of fly in the family of Lauxaniidae.
