= Minettia caesia =

Scientific classification
- Domain: Eukaryota
- Kingdom: Animalia
- Phylum: Arthropoda
- Class: Insecta
- Order: Diptera
- Family: Lauxaniidae
- Genus: Minettia
- Species: M. caesia

Binomial name
- Minettia caesia (Coquillett, 1904)

Synonyms
- Sapromyza caesia Coquillett, 1904

Species of fly

Minettia caesia is a species of fly in the family Lauxaniidae.
