= Minettia flaveola =

Scientific classification
- Kingdom: Animalia
- Phylum: Arthropoda
- Clade: Pancrustacea
- Class: Insecta
- Order: Diptera
- Family: Lauxaniidae
- Genus: Minettia
- Species: M. flaveola

Binomial name
- Minettia flaveola (Coquillett, 1898)

Synonyms
- Sapromyza flaveola Coquillett, 1898

Species of fly

Minettia flaveola is a species of fly in the family Lauxaniidae.
