= Minettia lobata =

Scientific classification
- Domain: Eukaryota
- Kingdom: Animalia
- Phylum: Arthropoda
- Class: Insecta
- Order: Diptera
- Family: Lauxaniidae
- Genus: Minettia
- Species: M. lobata

Binomial name
- Minettia lobata Shewell, 1938

Species of fly

Minettia lobata is a species of fly in the family Lauxaniidae.
