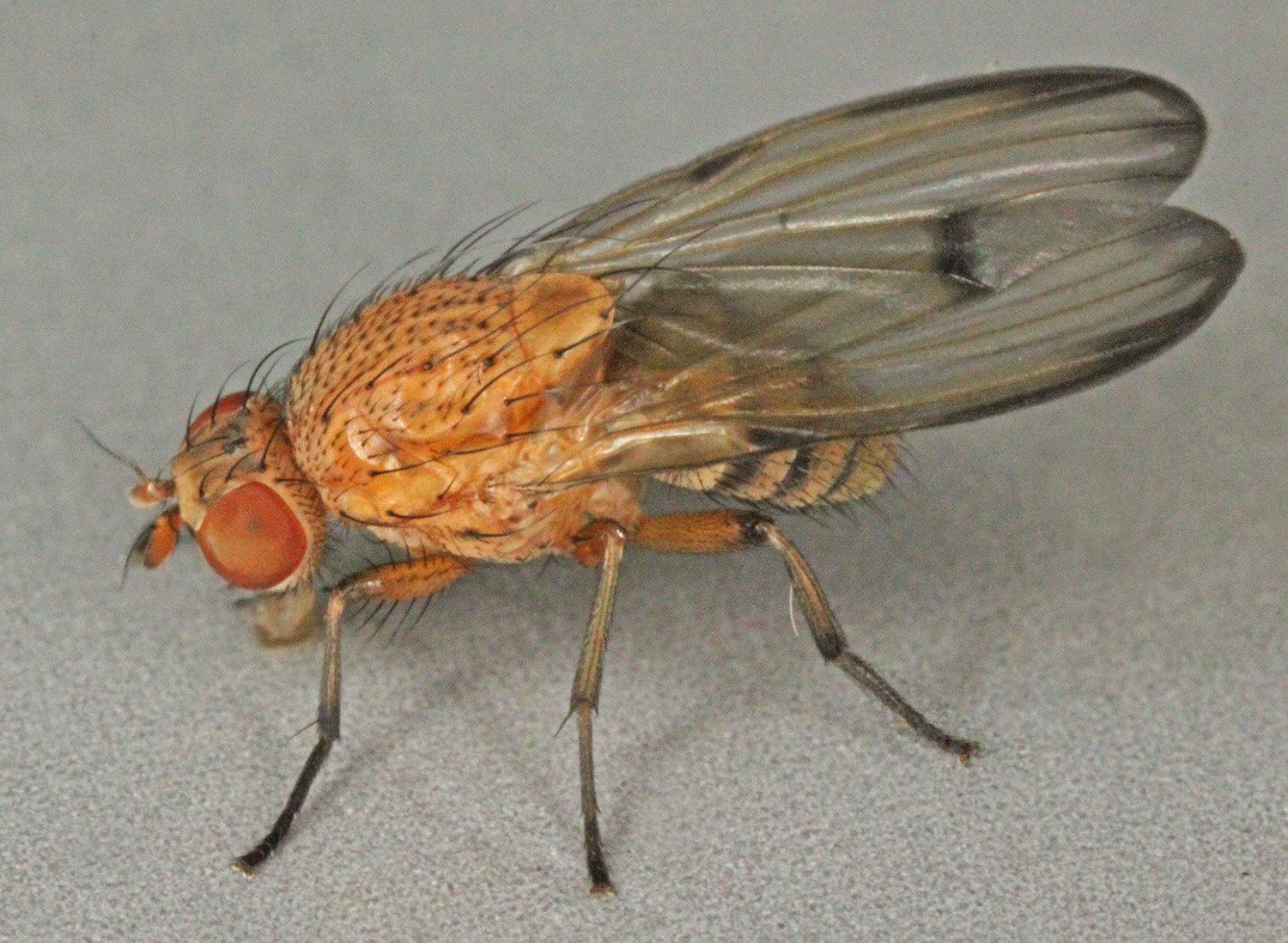
- Minettia inusta North Wales

Scientific classification
- Kingdom: Animalia
- Phylum: Arthropoda
- Class: Insecta
- Order: Diptera
- Family: Lauxaniidae
- Genus: Minettia
- Species: M. inusta

Binomial name
- Minettia inusta (Meigen, 1826)

Synonyms
- Sapromyza inusta Meigen, 1826; Palloptera dianae Stephens, 1829

= Minettia inusta =

Species of fly

Minettia inusta is a species of fly in the family Lauxaniidae. It is found in the Palearctic.
