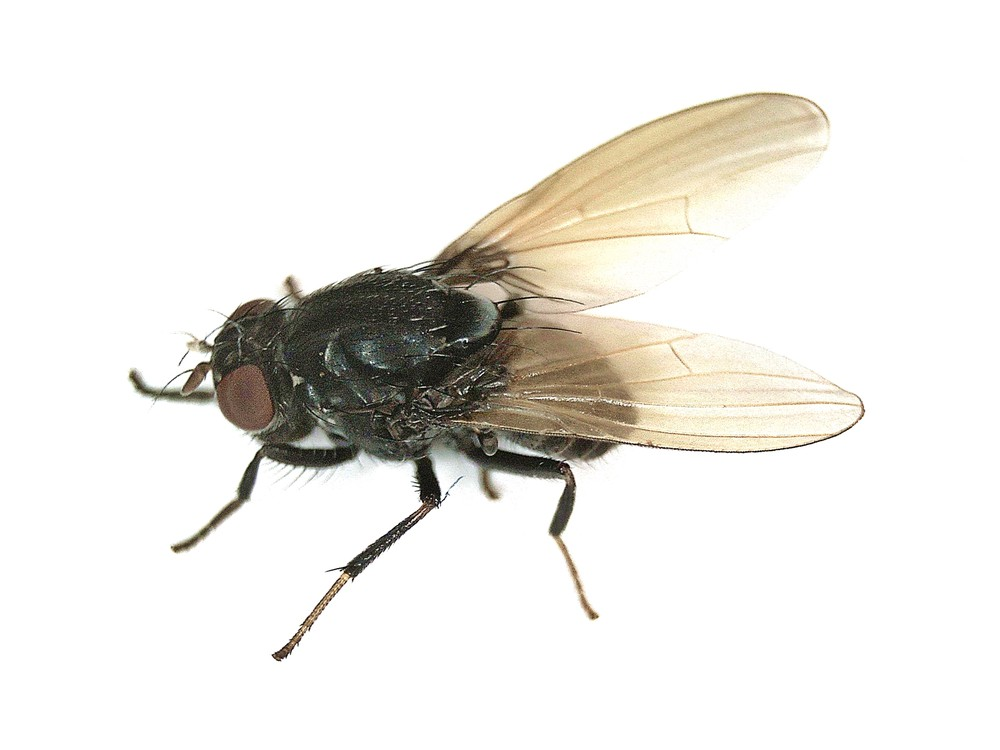
- Minettia longipennis Netherlands

Scientific classification
- Kingdom: Animalia
- Phylum: Arthropoda
- Class: Insecta
- Order: Diptera
- Family: Lauxaniidae
- Genus: Minettia
- Species: M. longipennis

Binomial name
- Minettia longipennis (Fabricius, 1794)

= Minettia longipennis =

Species of fly

Minettia longipennis is a species of fly in the family Lauxaniidae. It is found in the Palearctic.

Minettia longipennis is 3 to 4.5 mm. long. It is rounded with a black shiny thorax and long orange tinted wings sometimes held out at a horizontal angle. The habitat is hedgerows and wooded areas. Adults occur from May to September with a population peak in June. Larvae feed on fungi on dead leaves.

Minettia longipennis Video
