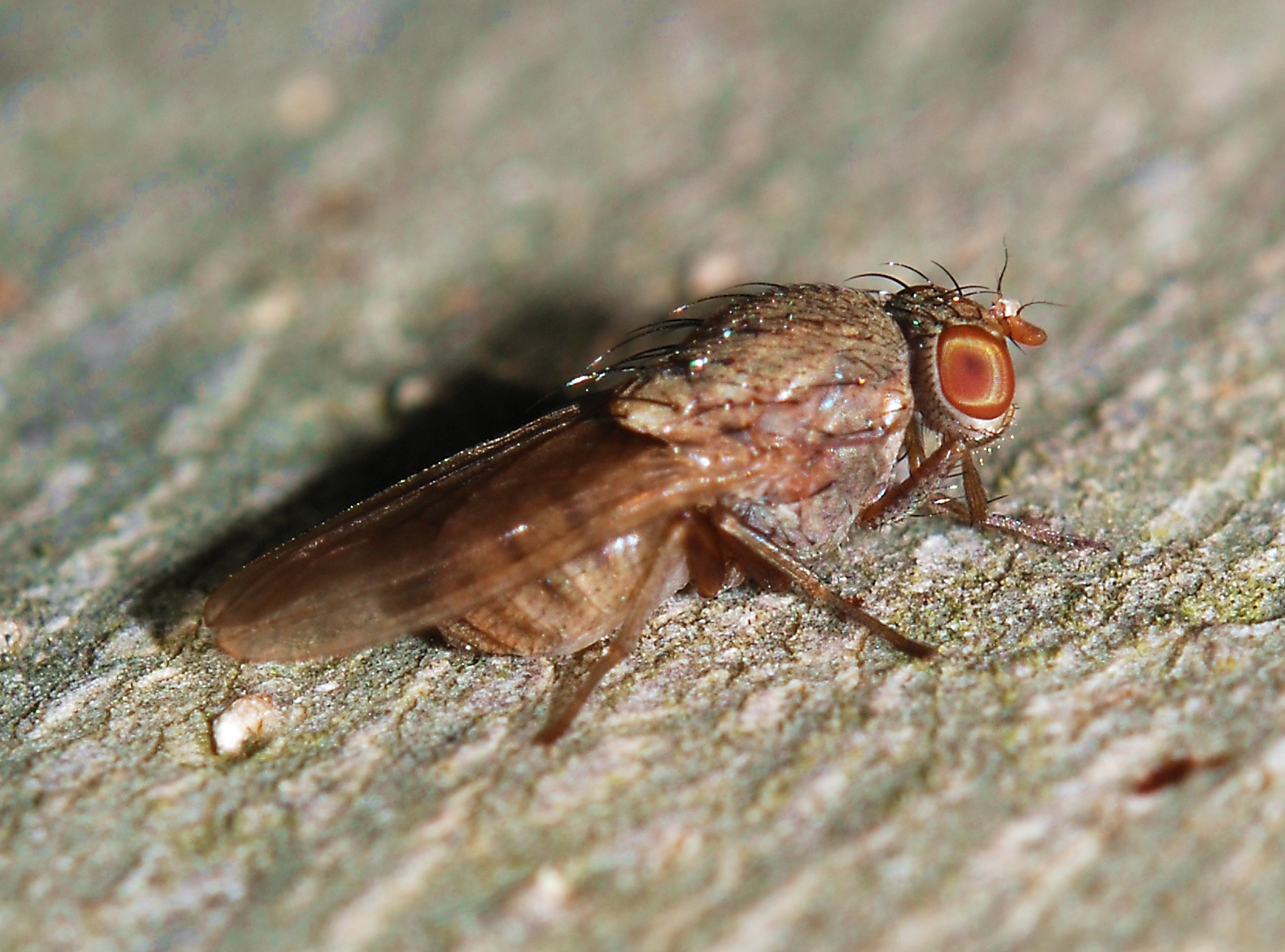

Scientific classification
- Kingdom: Animalia
- Phylum: Arthropoda
- Class: Insecta
- Order: Diptera
- Family: Lauxaniidae
- Genus: Minettia
- Species: M. fasciata

Binomial name
- Minettia fasciata (Fallén, 1826)

= Minettia fasciata =

Species of fly

Minettia fasciata is a species of fly in the family Lauxaniidae.

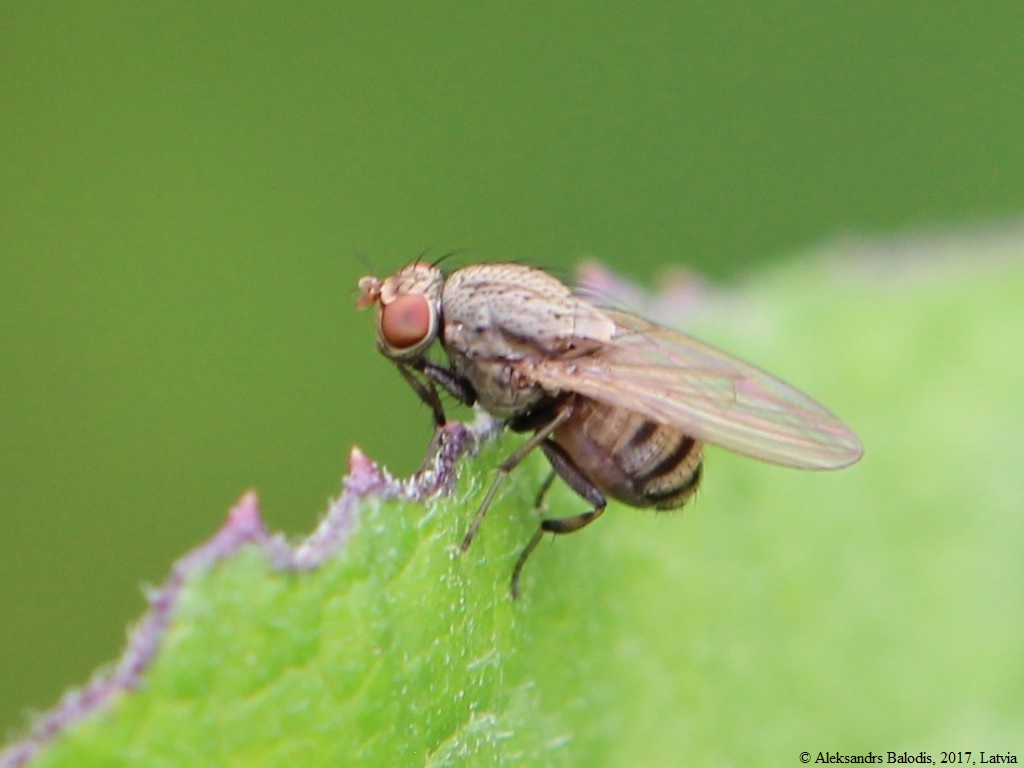
