= Minettia lupulina =

Scientific classification
- Kingdom: Animalia
- Phylum: Arthropoda
- Class: Insecta
- Order: Diptera
- Family: Lauxaniidae
- Genus: Minettia
- Species: M. lupulina

Binomial name
- Minettia lupulina (Fabricius, 1787)

Synonyms
- Musca lupulina Fabricius, 1787

Species of fly

Minettia lupulina is a species of fly in the family Lauxaniidae.
