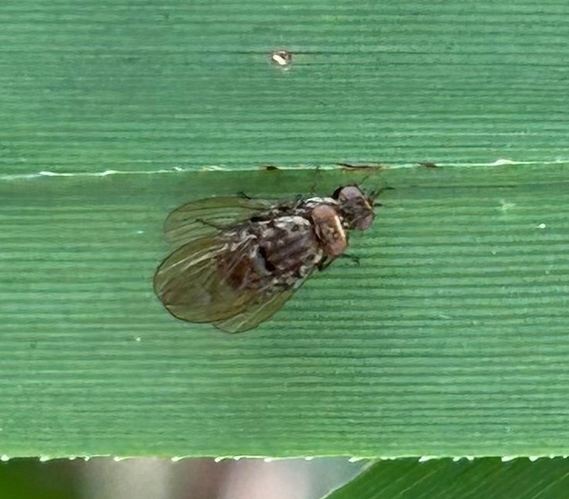

Scientific classification
- Kingdom: Animalia
- Phylum: Arthropoda
- Clade: Pancrustacea
- Class: Insecta
- Order: Diptera
- Family: Lauxaniidae
- Genus: Minettia
- Species: M. maculithorax

Binomial name
- Minettia maculithorax (Malloch, 1926)

= Minettia maculithorax =

Species of fly

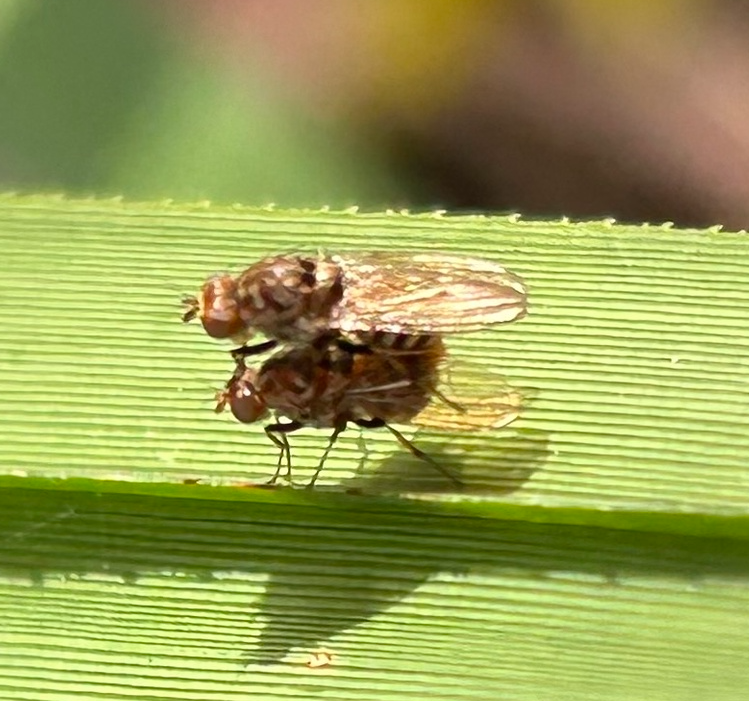
A pair of M. maculithorax, shown in side view

Minettia maculithorax is a species of fly in the family Lauxaniidae, occurring in eastern Australia.

== Description ==
Both males and females of this species are 4-4.5 mm in body length. There is a dull clay-yellow head with grey pruinescence on the orbits and ocellar triangle, and a face that is dark in the centre. The antennae are yellowish and the 3rd segment of each is dark at the apex. The palps are dark. The thorax is clay-coloured with grey pruinescence. On the top of the thorax are two brown submedian stripes which don't reach the anterior margin and which terminate in two blackish spots on the posterior margin. On either side of these stripes is a brown spot in front of the suture and a large brown mark behind the suture. The pleura have brown marks below the humeri as well as other brown patches. The abdomen is dark at the bases of each of its tergites. The legs are yellowish with dark femurs. The halteres are yellow.
