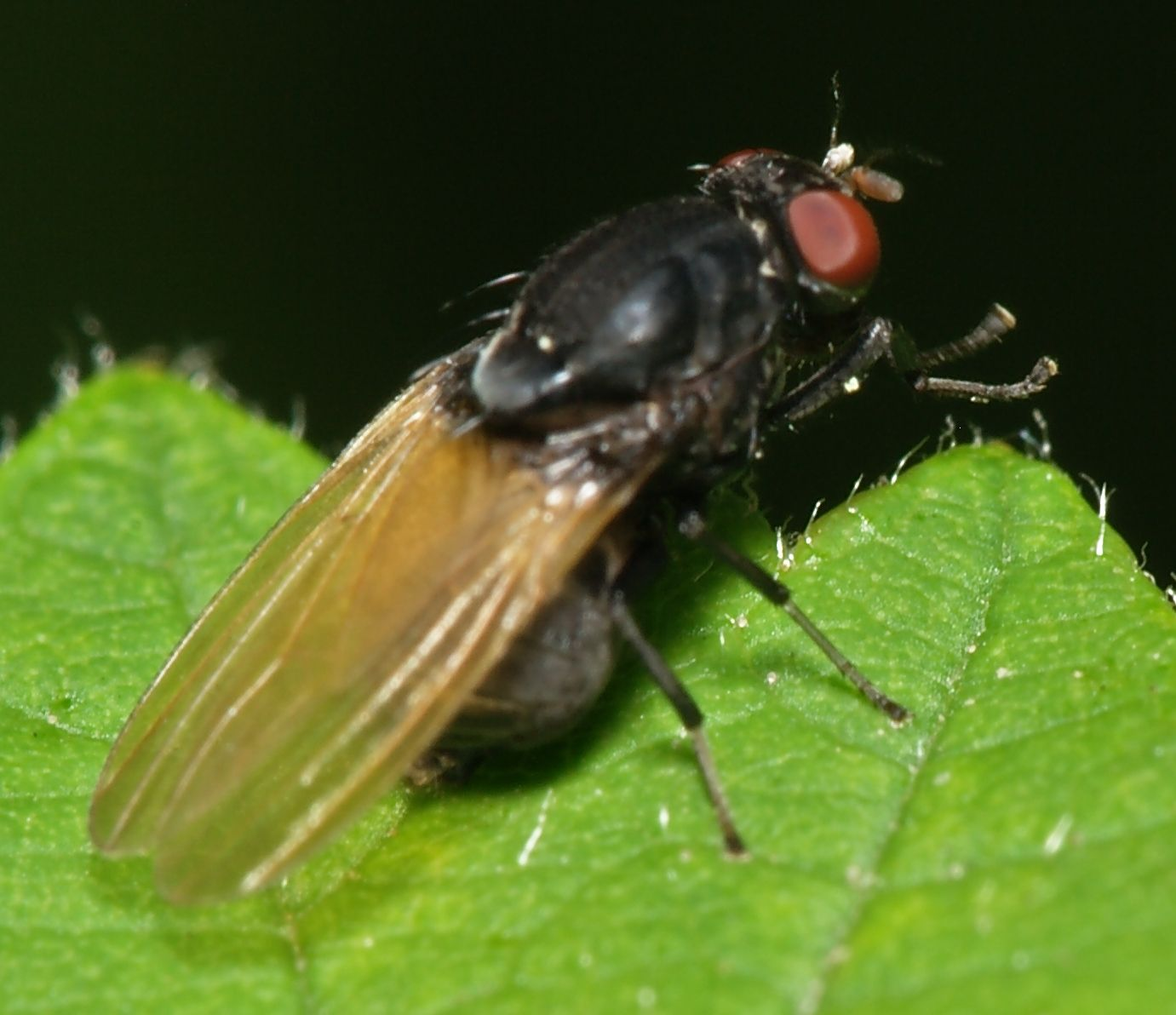
- Minettia longipennis

Scientific classification
- Domain: Eukaryota
- Kingdom: Animalia
- Phylum: Arthropoda
- Class: Insecta
- Order: Diptera
- Family: Lauxaniidae
- Subfamily: Lauxaniinae
- Genus: Minettia; Robineau-Desvoidy, 1830

Type species
- Minettia nemorosa Robineau-Desvoidy, 1830

Subgenera
- Frendelia (Collin, 1895); Plesiominettia Shatalkin, 2000; Minettia Robineau-Desvoidy, 1830

Synonyms
- Prorhaphochaeta Czerny, 1932

= Minettia =

Genus of flies

Minettia longipennis feeding on grass (video, 1m 17s)

Minettia is a genus of small flies of the family Lauxaniidae. They have almost worldwide distribution, is one of the most species rich genera of the family with more than 120 described species. The Palaearctic is the most diverse with some 56 described species. The genus is divided into 3 subgenera.

== Species ==
- Subgenus Plesioninettia Shatalkin, 2000

- M. crassulata Shatalkin, 1998
- M. divaricata Sasakawa, 1985
- M. filia (Becker, 1895)
- M. fuscescens Shatalkin, 1998
- M. gemina Shatalkin, 1992
- M. gemmata Shatalkin, 1992
- M. helva Czerny, 1932
- M. helvola (Becker, 1895)
- M. ishidai (Sasakawa, 1985)
- M. loewi (Schiner, 1864)
- M. omei Shatalkin, 1998
- M. punctata Sasakawa, 1985
- M. styriaca (Strobl, 1892)
- M. tenebrica Shatalkin, 1992

- Subgenus Frendelia Collin, 1948

- M. acuminata Sasakawa, 1985
- M. austriaca Hennig, 1951
- M. eoa Shatalkin, 1992
- M. kunashirica Shatalkin, 1992
- M. longipennis (Fabricius, 1794)
- M. martineki Ceianu, 1991
- M. nigritarsis Shatalkin, 1998

- Subgenus Minettia Robineau-Desvoidy, 1830

- M. andalusiaca (Strobl, 1899)
- M. biseriata (Loew, 1847)
- M. bulgarica Papp, 1981
- M. cantolraensis Carles-Tolra, 1998
- M. caucasica Shatalkin, 1998
- M. cypriota Papp, 1981
- M. czernyi Freidberg & Yarom, 1990
- M. dedecor (Loew, 1873)
- M. desmometopa (de Meijere, 1907)
- M. fasciata (Fallén, 1820)
- M. filippovi Shatalkin, 1998
- M. flavipalpis (Loew, 1847)
- M. flaviventris (Costa, 1844)
- M. galil Freidberg, 1991
- M. hyrcanica Shatalkin, 1999
- M. inusta (Meigen, 1826)
- M. linguifera Sasakawa & Kozanek, 1995
- M. longiseta (Loew, 1847)
- M. lupulina (Fabricius, 1787)
- M. muricata (Becker, 1895)
- M. palaestinensis Papp, 1981
- M. pallida (Meigen, 1830)
- M. plumicheta (Rondani, 1868)
- M. plumicornis (Fallén, 1820)
- M. punctiventris (Rondani, 1868)
- M. quadrisetosa (Becker, 1907)
- M. rivosa (Meigen, 1826)
- M. subtinctiventris Papp, 1981
- M. subvittata (Loew, 1847)
- M. suillorum (Robineau-Desvoidy, 1830)
- M. tabidiventris (Papp, 1877)
- M. tetrachaeta (Loew, 1873)
- M. tinctiventris (Rondani, 1868)
- M. tubifer (Meigen, 1826)
- M. tunisica Papp, 1981

- Unplaced

- M. aberrans (Malloch, 1925)
- M. maculithorax (Malloch, 1926)
- M. nigriventris (Czerny, 1932)
- M. rufiventris (Macquart, 1848)

== See also ==
- List of Minettia species
