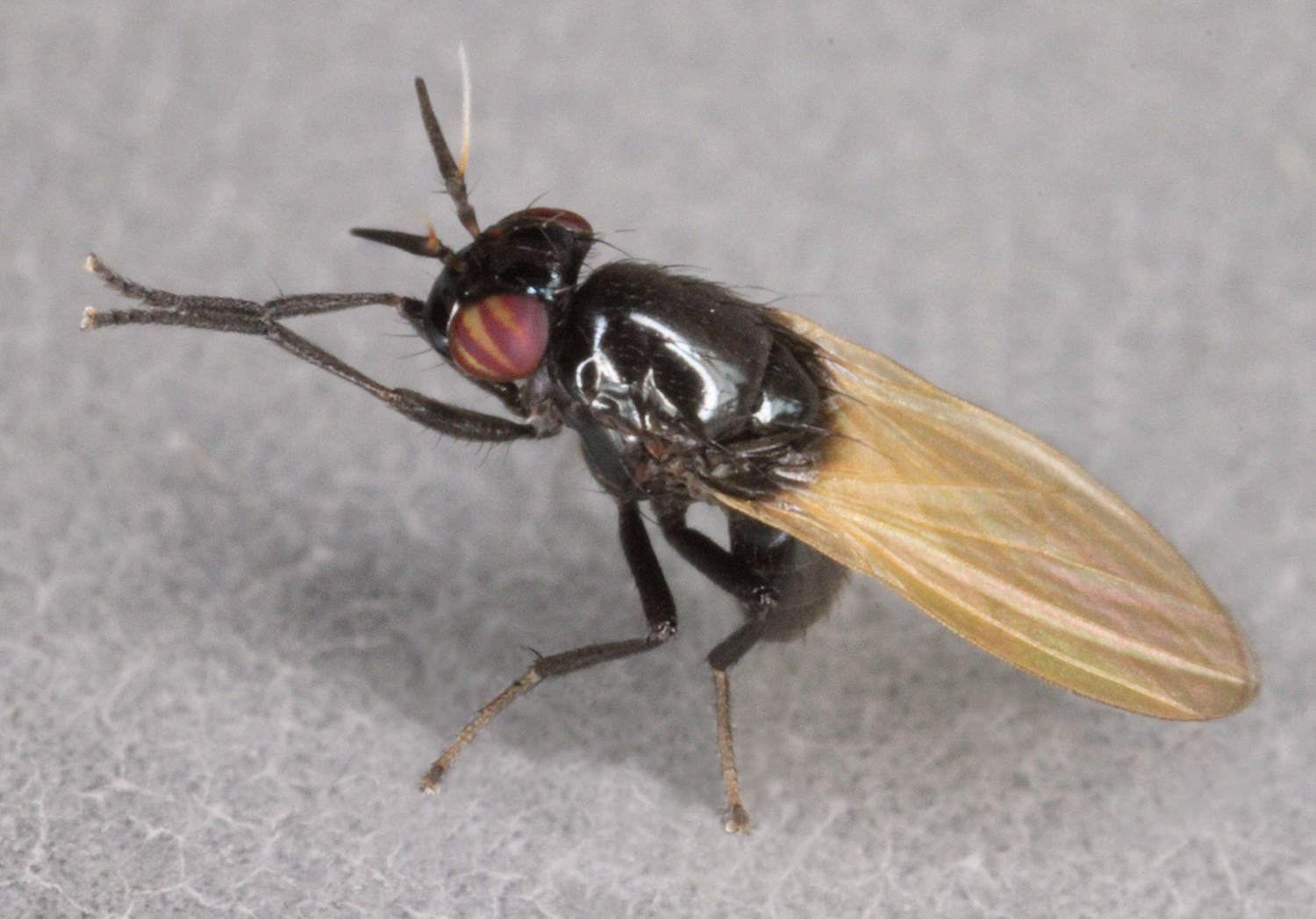
- Lauxania cylindricornis

Scientific classification
- Kingdom: Animalia
- Phylum: Arthropoda
- Class: Insecta
- Order: Diptera
- Family: Lauxaniidae
- Subfamily: Lauxaniinae
- Genus: Lauxania; Latreille, 1804

Type species
- Musca cylindricornis Fabricius, 1794

Synonyms
- Tasmania Tonnoir & Malloch, 1926

= Lauxania =

Genus of flies

Lauxania is a genus of small flies of the family Lauxaniidae.

== Selected species ==
- L. albipes Wiedemann, 1830
- L. albiseta Coquillett, 1898
- L. albovittata Loew, 1862
- L. anceps Curran, 1938
- L. argyrostoma Wiedemann, 1830
- L. atrovirens Loew, 1862
- L. bilobata Merz, 2001
- L. chlorogastra Loew, 1862
- L. clypeata Loew, 1862
- L. cyanea Fabricius, 1805
- L. cylindricornis (Fabricius, 1794)
- L. flavipes Bezzi, 1908
- L. flavohalterata Shatalkin, 1993
- L. gagatina Loew, 1852
- L. glabrifrons Perusse & Wheeler, 2000
- L. kafarista Perusse & Wheeler, 2000
- L. kerzhneri Remm & Elberg, 1980
- L. martineki Shatalkin, 1999
- L. metallica Wiedemann, 1830
- L. minor Martinek, 1974
- L. nigrimana Coquillett, 1902
- L. oblonga Loew, 1862
- L. shewelli Perusse & Wheeler, 2000
- L. siciliana Merz, 2001
- L. sonora Shatalkin, 1993
- L. torso Curran, 1938
- L. vitripennis Shatalkin, 1993
- L. zinovjevi Elberg, 1993
