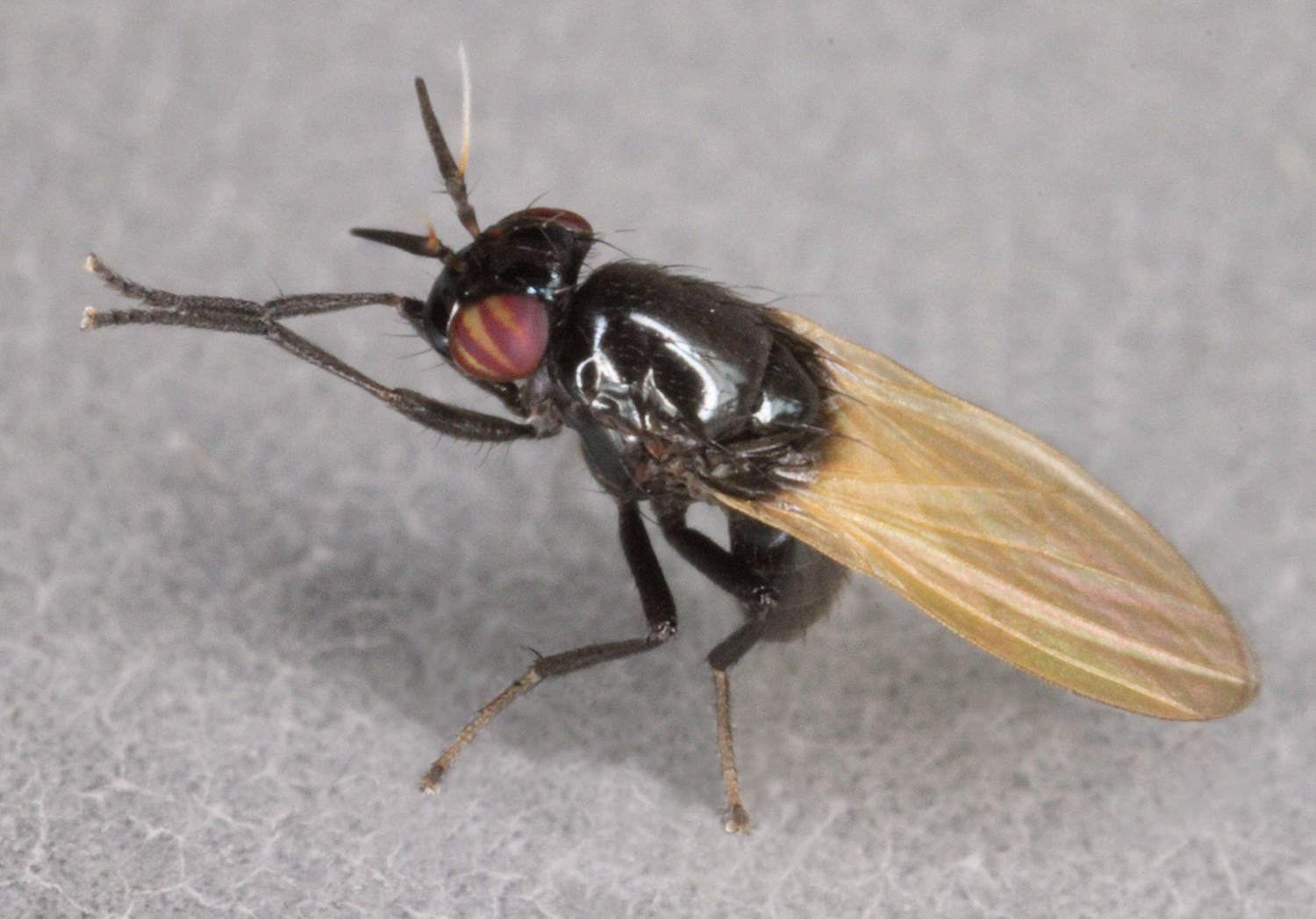
- Lauxania cylindricornis North Wales

Scientific classification
- Kingdom: Animalia
- Phylum: Arthropoda
- Class: Insecta
- Order: Diptera
- Family: Lauxaniidae
- Genus: Lauxania
- Species: L. cylindricornis

Binomial name
- Lauxania cylindricornis (Fabricius, 1794)

= Lauxania cylindricornis =

Species of fly

Lauxania cylindricornis is a species of fly in the family Lauxaniidae. It is found in the Palearctic.Long 2-3.5mm. Small glossy black with yellowish wings black at the base. The porrect, cylindrical antennae are longer than the head. The habitat is lush vegetation in marshes. The larvae feed on micro-organisms within decaying plant tissues

Video

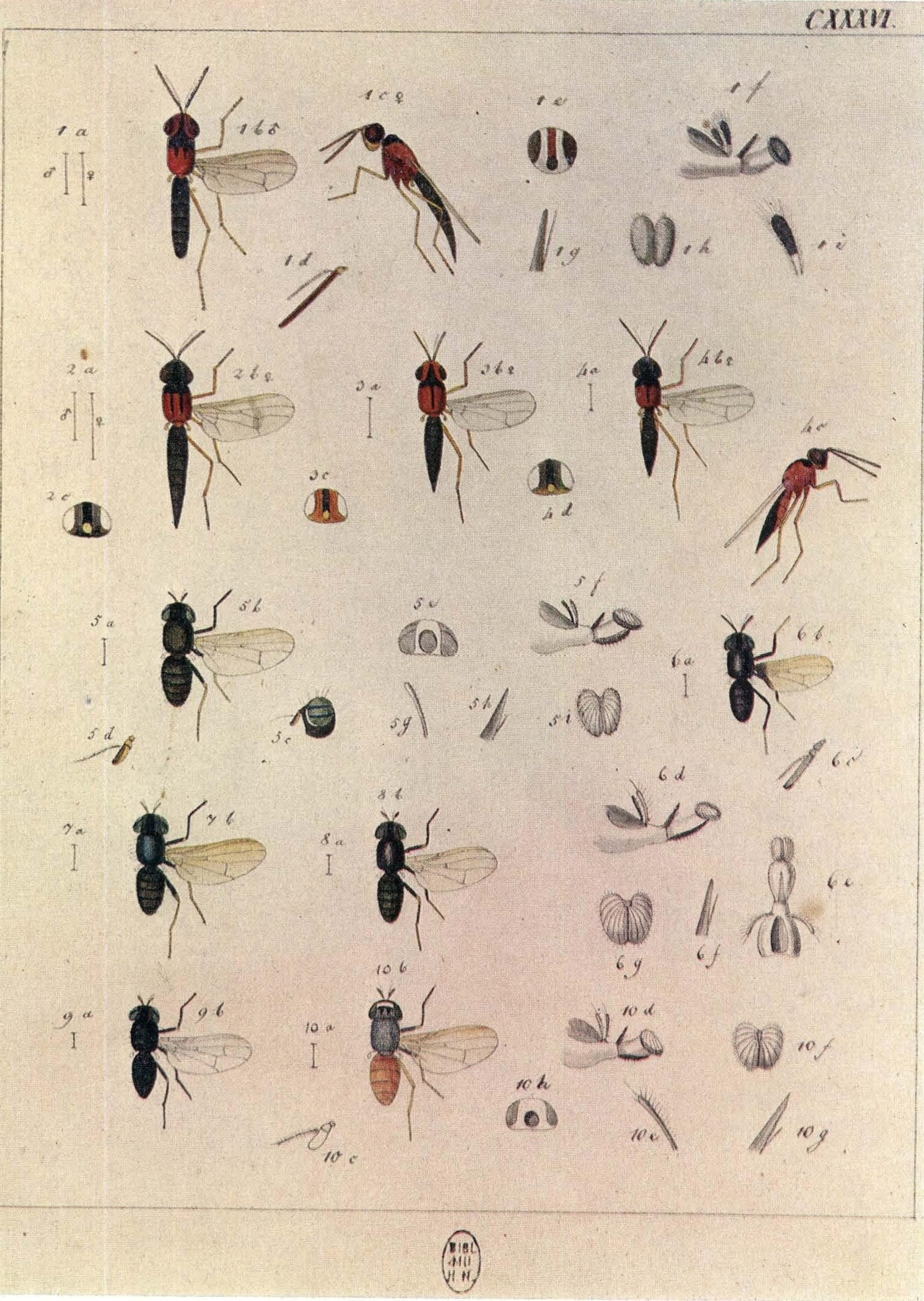
Depicted in Meigen Europäischen Zweiflügeligen
