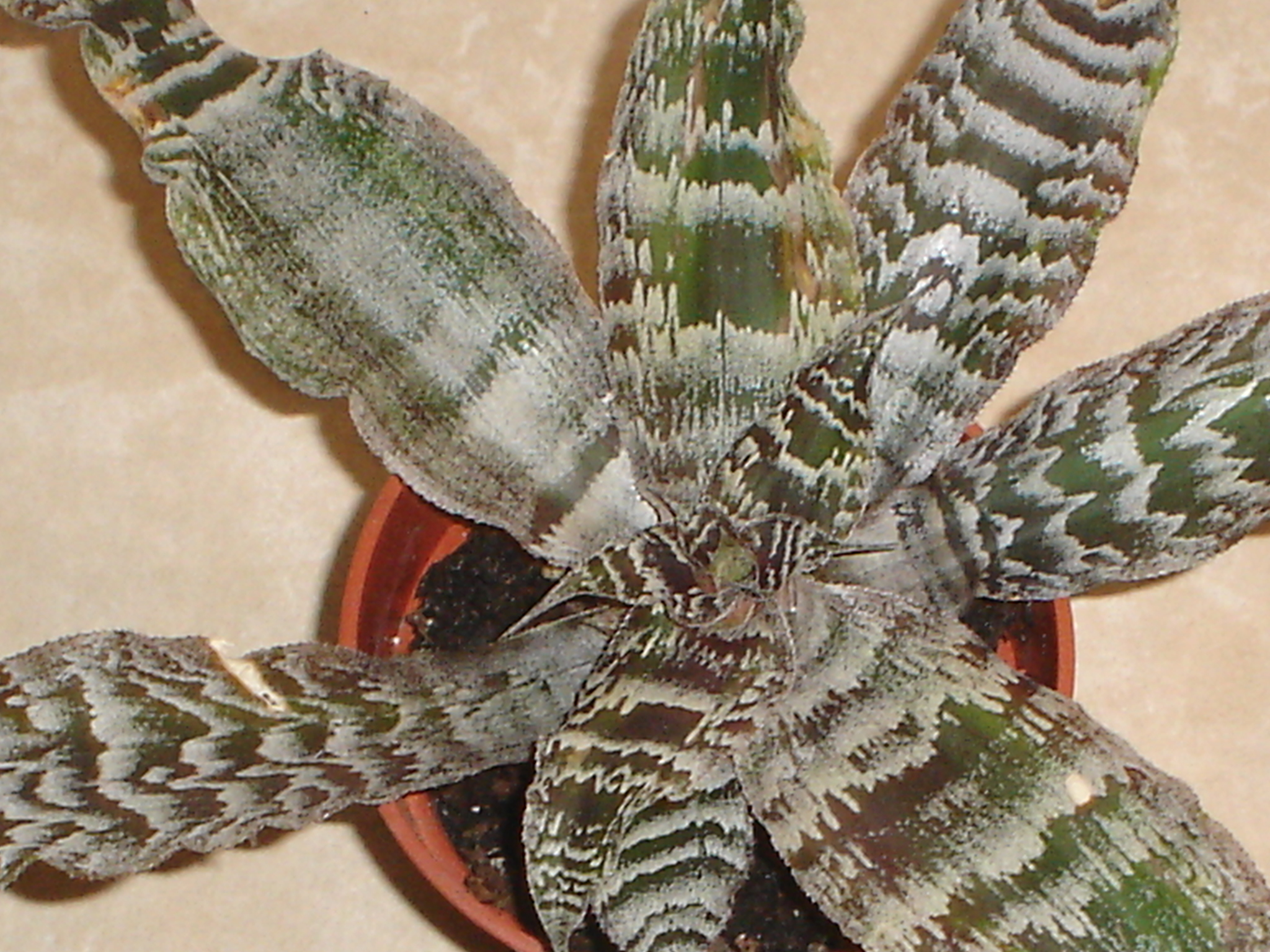
- Cryptanthus zonatus

Scientific classification
- Kingdom: Plantae
- Clade: Tracheophytes
- Clade: Angiosperms
- Clade: Monocots
- Clade: Commelinids
- Order: Poales
- Family: Bromeliaceae
- Subfamily: Bromelioideae
- Genus: Cryptanthus; Otto & A.Dietr.

Synonyms
- Madvigia Liebm.; Pholidophyllum Vis.

= Cryptanthus =

Genus of flowering plants

Cryptanthus is a genus of flowering plants in the family Bromeliaceae, subfamily Bromelioideae. The genus name is from the Greek cryptos (hidden) and anthos (flower). The genus formerly had two recognized subgenera: the type subgenus and subgenus Hoplocryptanthus Mez which has been raised to the separate genus Hoplocryptanthus. All species of this genus are endemic to Brazil. The common name for any Cryptanthus is "Earth star".

== Species ==
As of November 2022, Plants of the World Online accepted the following species:

- Cryptanthus acaulis (Lindl.) Beer
- Cryptanthus alagoanus Leme & J.A.Siqueira
- Cryptanthus apiculatantherus D.M.C.Ferreira, E.M.Almeida & Louzada
- Cryptanthus bahianus L.B.Sm.
- Cryptanthus beuckeri É.Morren
- Cryptanthus bibarrensis Leme
- Cryptanthus bivittatus (Hook.) Regel
- Cryptanthus boanovensis Leme
- Cryptanthus brevibracteatus D.M.C.Ferreira & Louzada
- Cryptanthus brevifolius Leme
- Cryptanthus bromelioides Otto & A.Dietr.
- Cryptanthus capitatus Leme
- Cryptanthus capitellatus Leme & L.Kollmann
- Cryptanthus colnagoi Rauh & Leme
- Cryptanthus coriaceus Leme
- Cryptanthus correia-araujoi Leme
- Cryptanthus crassifolius Leme
- Cryptanthus cruzalmensis Leme & E.H.Souza
- Cryptanthus delicatus Leme
- Cryptanthus diamantinensis Leme
- Cryptanthus dianae Leme
- Cryptanthus dorothyae Leme
- Cryptanthus felixii J.A.Siqueira & Leme
- Cryptanthus flesheri E.H.Souza & Leme
- Cryptanthus giganteus Leme & A.P.Fontana
- Cryptanthus grazielae H.Luther
- Cryptanthus guanduensis Leme & L.Kollmann
- Cryptanthus heimenii P.J.Braun & Gonç.Brito
- Cryptanthus ilhanus Leme
- Cryptanthus incrassatus L.B.Sm.
- Cryptanthus lacerdae Van Geert
- Cryptanthus lutandensis E.H.Souza & Leme
- Cryptanthus lutherianus I.Ramírez
- Cryptanthus lyman-smithii Leme
- Cryptanthus marginatus L.B.Sm.
- Cryptanthus maritimus L.B.Sm.
- Cryptanthus minarum L.B.Sm.
- Cryptanthus osiris W.Weber
- Cryptanthus pickelii L.B.Sm.
- Cryptanthus praetextus É.Morren ex Baker
- Cryptanthus pseudopetiolatus Philcox
- Cryptanthus reisii Leme
- Cryptanthus reptans Leme & J.A.Siqueira
- Cryptanthus rigidifolius Leme
- Cryptanthus robsonianus Leme
- Cryptanthus ruthiae Philcox
- Cryptanthus santateresinhensis Leme
- Cryptanthus santosii Leme & E.H.Souza
- Cryptanthus seidelianus W.Weber
- Cryptanthus sergipensis I.Ramírez
- Cryptanthus solidadeanus Leme & E.H.Souza
- Cryptanthus tabuleiricola Leme & L.Kollmann
- Cryptanthus teretifolius Leme
- Cryptanthus ubairensis I.Ramírez
- Cryptanthus univittatus Leme
- Cryptanthus venecianus Leme & L.Kollmann
- Cryptanthus viridipetalus Leme & L.Kollmann
- Cryptanthus viridovinosus Leme
- Cryptanthus walkerianus Leme & L.Kollmann
- Cryptanthus warren-loosei Leme
- Cryptanthus zonatus (Lem.) Vis.

== Former species ==
A major revision of Cryptanthus in 2017 based on both morphological and molecular characters elevated a former subgenus to the genus Hoplocryptanthus and created two new genera, Forzzaea and Rokautskyia, transferring many former Cryptanthus species to these three genera.

=== Transferred to Forzzaea ===
- Cryptanthus leopoldo-horstii Rauh → Forzzaea leopoldo-horstii (Rauh) Leme, S.Heller & Zizka
- Cryptanthus micrus Louzada, Wand. & Versieux → Forzzaea micra (Louzada, Wand. & Versieux) Leme, S.Heller & Zizka
- Cryptanthus warasii E.Pereira → Forzzaea warasii (E.Pereira) Leme, S.Heller & Zizka

=== Transferred to Haplocryptanthus ===
- Cryptanthus caracensis Leme & E.Gross → Hoplocryptanthus caracensis (Leme & E.Gross) Leme, S.Heller & Zizka
- Cryptanthus ferrarius Leme & C.C.Paula → Hoplocryptanthus ferrarius (Leme & C.C.Paula) Leme, S.Heller & Zizka
- Cryptanthus glaziovii Mez → Hoplocryptanthus glaziovii (Mez) Leme, S.Heller & Zizka
- Cryptanthus lavrasensis Leme → Hoplocryptanthus lavrasensis (Leme) Leme, S.Heller & Zizka
- Cryptanthus regius Leme → Hoplocryptanthus regius (Leme) Leme, S.Heller & Zizka
- Cryptanthus schwackeanus Mez → Hoplocryptanthus schwackeanus (Mez) Leme, S.Heller & Zizka
- Cryptanthus tiradentesensis Leme → Hoplocryptanthus tiradentesensis (Leme) Leme, S.Heller & Zizka

=== Transferred to Rokautskyia ===
- Cryptanthus caulescens I.Ramírez → Rokautskyia caulescens
- Cryptanthus exaltatus H.Luther → Rokautskyia exaltata
- Cryptanthus fernseeoides Leme → Rokautskyia fernseeoides
- Cryptanthus latifolius Leme → Rokautskyia latifolia
- Cryptanthus leuzingerae Leme → Rokautskyia leuzingerae
- Cryptanthus microglazioui I.Ramírez → Rokautskyia microglazioui (I.Ramírez) Leme, S.Heller & Zizka
- Cryptanthus odoratissimus Leme → Rokautskyia odoratissima
- Cryptanthus pseudoglaziovii Leme → Rokautskyia pseudoglaziovii
- Cryptanthus pseudoscaposus L.B.Sm. → Rokautskyia pseudoscaposa
- Cryptanthus roberto-kautskyi Leme → Rokautskyia roberto-kautskyi
- Cryptanthus sanctaluciae Leme & L.Kollmann → Rokautskyia sanctaluciae
- Cryptanthus scaposus E.Pereira → Rokautskyia scaposa
- Cryptanthus whitmanii Leme → Rokautskyia whitmanii

=== Transferred to Siqueiranthus ===
- Cryptanthus cinereus D.M.C.Ferreira & Louzada → Siqueiranthus cinereus
