= C. giganteus =

C. giganteus may refer to:

- Chorus giganteus, a sea snail species
- Cordylus giganteus, the giant girdled lizard, a lizard species
- Cryptanthus giganteus, a plant species endemic to Brazil
- Cynosurus giganteus, a grass species in the genus Cynosurus
- Cyperus giganteus, the piripiri, a plant species native to central Mexico as far south as Uruguay

== Synonyms ==
- Cereus giganteus, a synonym for Carnegiea gigantea, the saguaro, a cactus species native to the U.S. states of Arizona and California and to the Mexican state of Sonora
- Crotalus giganteus, a synonym for Crotalus adamanteus, a venomous pitviper species found in the southeastern United States
