= C. acaulis =

C. acaulis may refer to:

- Carex acaulis, a sedge
- Carlina acaulis, a thistle
- Cryptanthus acaulis, a bromeliad
- Cymopterus acaulis, an umbellifer
