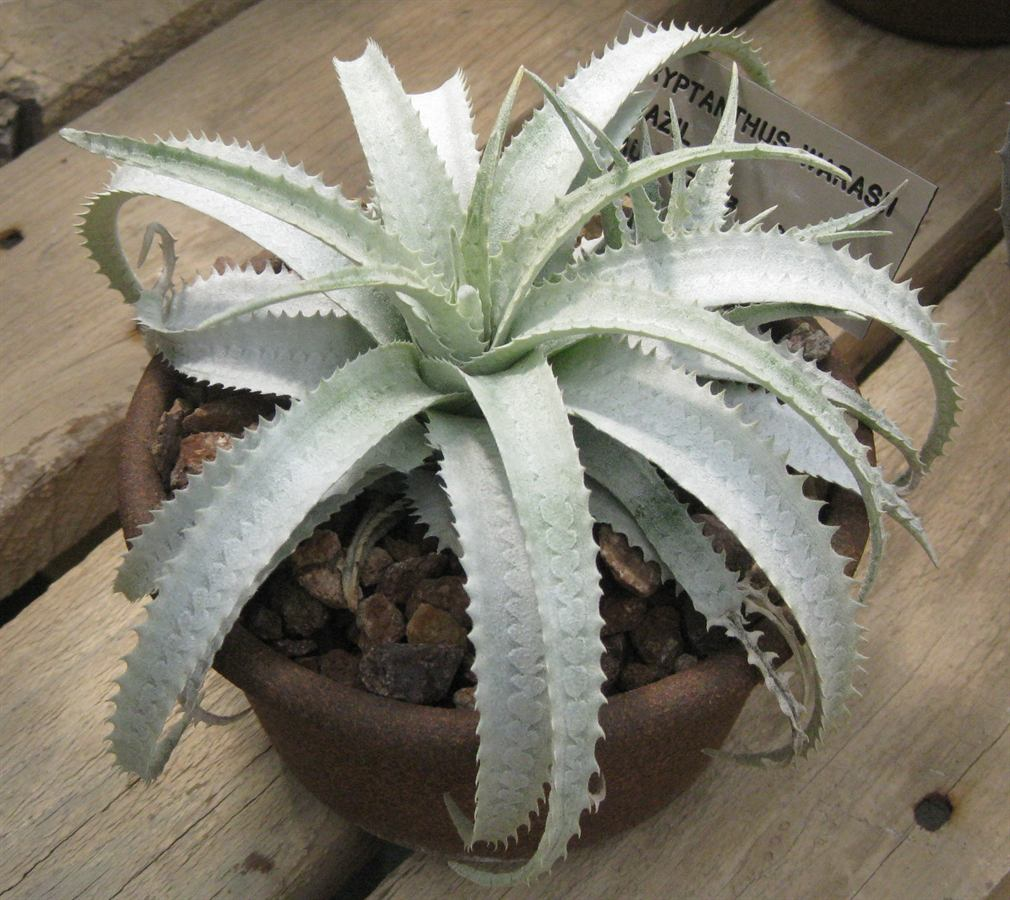

Scientific classification
- Kingdom: Plantae
- Clade: Tracheophytes
- Clade: Angiosperms
- Clade: Monocots
- Clade: Commelinids
- Order: Poales
- Family: Bromeliaceae
- Genus: Forzzaea
- Species: F. warasii

Binomial name
- Forzzaea warasii (E.Pereira) Leme, S.Heller & Zizka

= Forzzaea warasii =

Species of flowering plant

Forzzaea warasii is a plant species in the genus Forzzaea. This species is endemic to Brazil. It was formerly placed in Cryptanthus.

== Cultivars ==
- Cryptanthus 'Sandy Antle'
- Cryptanthus 'State Trooper'
- Cryptanthus 'Twilight'
