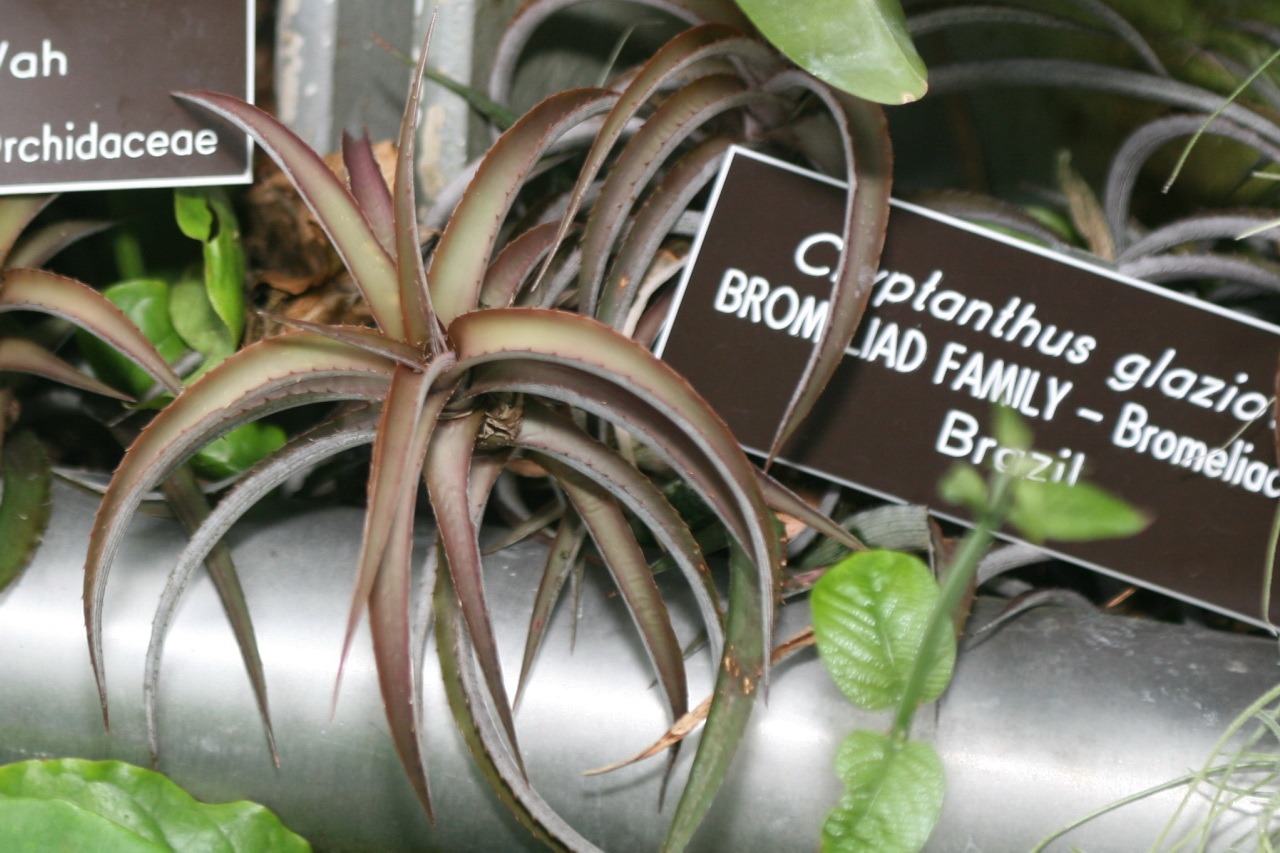
- Hoplocryptanthus glaziovii

Scientific classification
- Kingdom: Plantae
- Clade: Embryophytes
- Clade: Tracheophytes
- Clade: Spermatophytes
- Clade: Angiosperms
- Clade: Monocots
- Clade: Commelinids
- Order: Poales
- Family: Bromeliaceae
- Subfamily: Bromelioideae
- Genus: Hoplocryptanthus (Mez) Leme, S.Heller & Zizka

Synonyms
- Cryptanthus subg. Hoplocryptanthus Mez

= Hoplocryptanthus =

Genus of plants

Hoplocryptanthus is a genus of flowering plants belonging to the family Bromeliaceae. It was formerly treated as the subgenus Hoplocryptanthus of the genus Cryptanthus.

Its native range is Southeastern Brazil.

Species:

- Hoplocryptanthus caracensis (Leme & E.Gross) Leme, S.Heller & Zizka, syn. Cryptanthus caracensis
- Hoplocryptanthus ferrarius (Leme & C.C.Paula) Leme, S.Heller & Zizka, syn. Cryptanthus ferrarius
- Hoplocryptanthus glaziovii (Mez) Leme, S.Heller & Zizka, syn. Cryptanthus glaziovii
- Hoplocryptanthus knegtianus O.B.C.Ribeiro & Leme
- Hoplocryptanthus lavrasensis (Leme) Leme, S.Heller & Zizka, syn. Cryptanthus lavrasensis
- Hoplocryptanthus regius (Leme) Leme, S.Heller & Zizka, syn. Cryptanthus regius
- Hoplocryptanthus schwackeanus (Mez) Leme, S.Heller & Zizka, syn. Cryptanthus schwackeanus
- Hoplocryptanthus serrapiresensis Leme, J.L.Lobo, O.B.C.Ribeiro & Gelli de Faria
- Hoplocryptanthus tiradentesensis (Leme) Leme, S.Heller & Zizka, syn. Cryptanthus tiradentesensis
- Hoplocryptanthus vidaliorum (O.B.C.Ribeiro & C.C.Paula) Leme, S.Heller & Zizka
