= Cryptanthus burle-marxii =

Scientific classification
- Kingdom: Plantae
- Clade: Tracheophytes
- Clade: Angiosperms
- Clade: Monocots
- Clade: Commelinids
- Order: Poales
- Family: Bromeliaceae
- Genus: Cryptanthus
- Species: C. burle-marxii

Binomial name
- Cryptanthus burle-marxii Leme

Species of flowering plant

Cryptanthus burle-marxii is a plant species in the genus Cryptanthus. This species is endemic to Brazil.

== Cultivars ==
- Cryptanthus 'Andrew Filadelfia'
- Cryptanthus 'Bonfire'
- Cryptanthus 'Jacob Pondo'
- Cryptanthus 'Mesa Verde'
- Cryptanthus 'Muddy River'
- Cryptanthus 'Rambling Man'
- Cryptanthus 'Salamanca'
- Cryptanthus 'Tundra'
