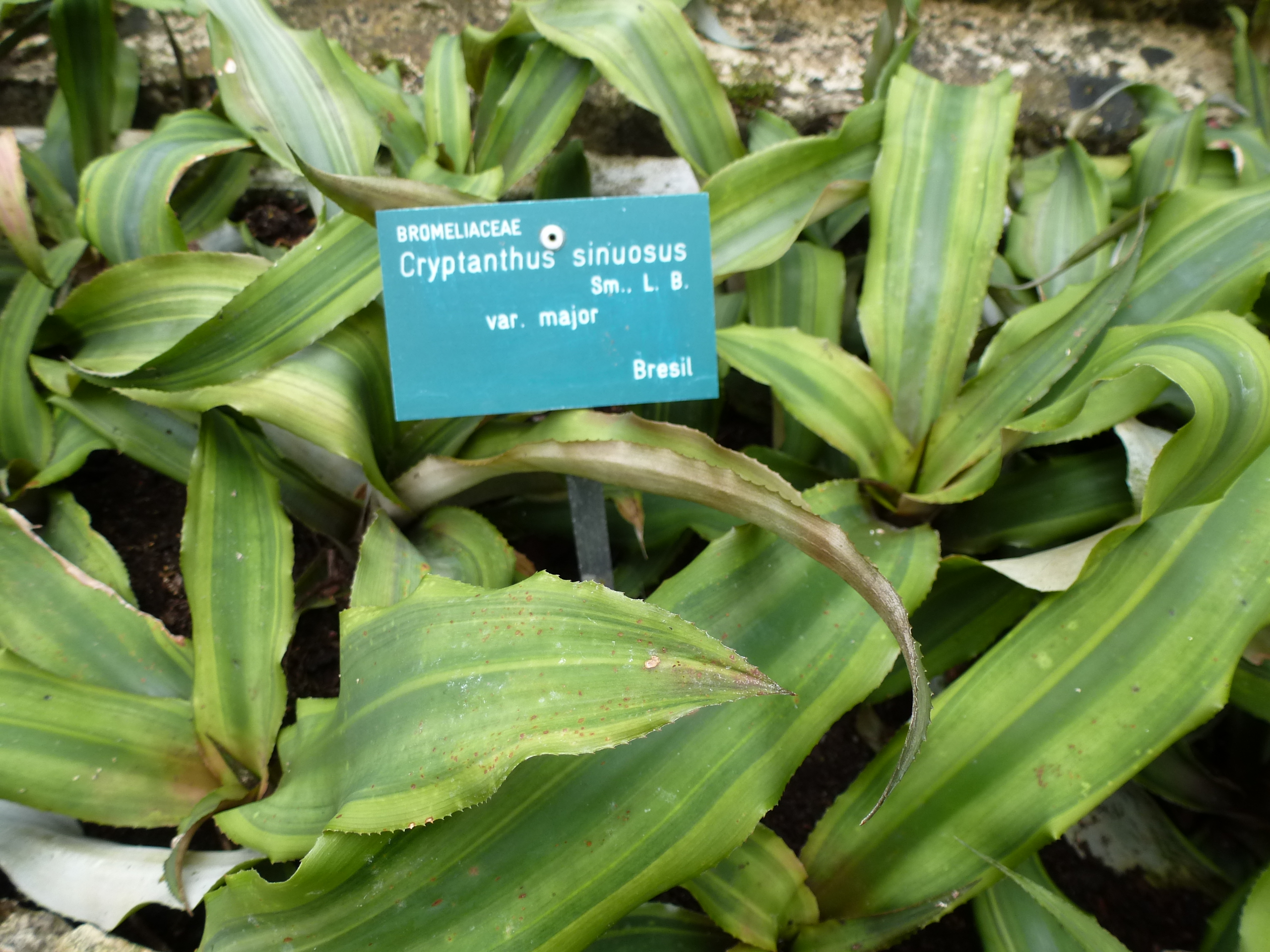

Scientific classification
- Kingdom: Plantae
- Clade: Tracheophytes
- Clade: Angiosperms
- Clade: Monocots
- Clade: Commelinids
- Order: Poales
- Family: Bromeliaceae
- Genus: Cryptanthus
- Species: C. sinuosus

Binomial name
- Cryptanthus sinuosus L.B.Sm.

= Cryptanthus sinuosus =

Species of flowering plant

Cryptanthus sinuosus is a plant species in the genus Cryptanthus. This plant is endemic to the Brazilian state of Rio de Janeiro where it lives in coastal rain forests and sandy coastal plains.

== Cultivars ==
- Cryptanthus 'Big Brown'
- Cryptanthus 'Bob Whitman'
- Cryptanthus 'Bravo'
- Cryptanthus 'Cascade'
- Cryptanthus 'Cheers'
- Cryptanthus 'Earth Angel'
- Cryptanthus 'Gay Affair'
- Cryptanthus 'Georgia Waggoner'
- Cryptanthus 'Green Fields'
- Cryptanthus 'Hello Dolly'
- Cryptanthus 'Imposter Red'
- Cryptanthus 'Pink Floyd'
- Cryptanthus 'Pink To Green'
- Cryptanthus 'Red Cabbage'
- Cryptanthus 'Red Edge'
- Cryptanthus 'Road To Buzios'
- Cryptanthus 'Shining Red'
- Cryptanthus 'Silver Touch'
- Cryptanthus 'Soft Shadows'
- Cryptanthus 'Southern Star'
- Cryptanthus 'Spic 'N Span'
- Cryptanthus 'Undulatus'
- Cryptanthus 'Waterfall'
- Cryptanthus 'White Lace'
