= C. marginatus =

C. marginatus may refer to:

- Callinectes marginatus, the sharptooth swimcrab or marbled swimcrab
- Charadrius marginatus, the white-fronted plover or white-fronted sandplover
- Chauliognathus marginatus, the margined soldier beetle
- Cladodus marginatus, a prehistoric fish species
- Coreus marginatus, the dock bug
- Cryptanthus marginatus, a plant species endemic to Brazil
