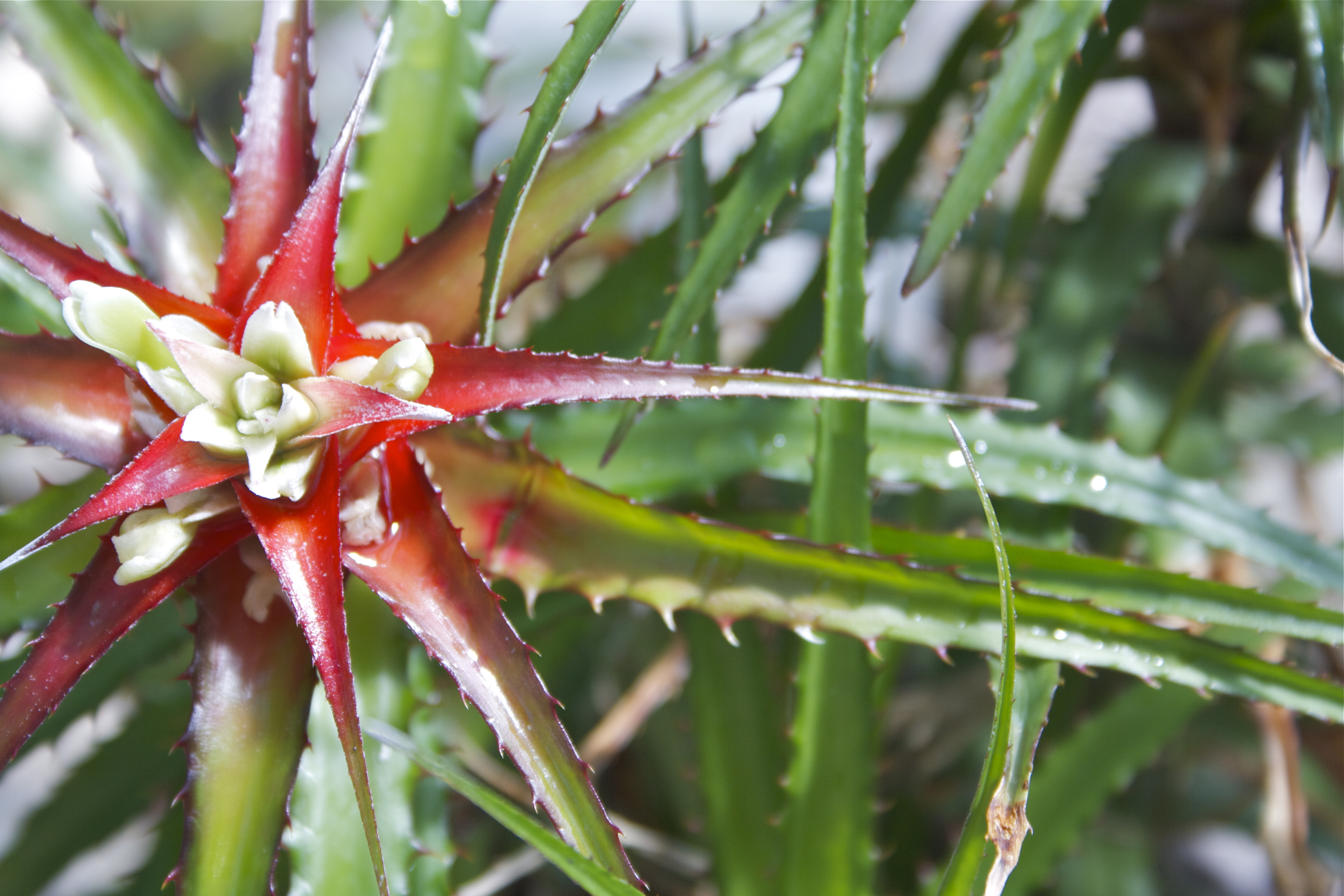
- Rokautskyia whitmanii

Scientific classification
- Kingdom: Plantae
- Clade: Tracheophytes
- Clade: Angiosperms
- Clade: Monocots
- Clade: Commelinids
- Order: Poales
- Family: Bromeliaceae
- Subfamily: Bromelioideae
- Genus: Rokautskyia; Leme, S.Heller & Zizka

Species
- See text.

Synonyms

= Rokautskyia =

Genus of plants

Rokautskyia is a genus of flowering plant in the family Bromeliaceae, native to eastern Brazil. The genus was first established in 2017, and is placed in subfamily Bromelioideae.

== Species ==
As of November 2022, Plants of the World Online accepted the following species, all transferred from Cryptanthus.

- Rokautskyia aracruzensis (Leme & L.Kollmann) Leme, S.Heller & Zizka, syn. Cryptanthus aracruzensis Leme & L.Kollmann
- Rokautskyia caulescens (I.Ramírez) Leme, S.Heller & Zizka, syn. Cryptanthus caulescens I.Ramírez
- Rokautskyia exaltata (H.Luther) Leme, S.Heller & Zizka, syn. Cryptanthus exaltatus H.Luther
- Rokautskyia fernseeoides (Leme) Leme, S.Heller & Zizka, syn. Cryptanthus fernseeoides Leme
- Rokautskyia latifolia (Leme) Leme, S.Heller & Zizka, syn. Cryptanthus latifolius Leme
- Rokautskyia leuzingerae (Leme) Leme, S.Heller & Zizka, syn. Cryptanthus leuzingerae Leme
- Rokautskyia microglazioui (I.Ramírez) Leme, S.Heller & Zizka, syn. Cryptanthus microglazioui I.Ramírez
- Rokautskyia odoratissima (Leme) Leme, S.Heller & Zizka, syn. Cryptanthus odoratissimus Leme
- Rokautskyia pseudoglaziovii (Leme) Leme, S.Heller & Zizka, syn. Cryptanthus pseudoglaziovii Leme
- Rokautskyia pseudoscaposa (L.B.Sm.) Leme, S.Heller & Zizka, syn. Cryptanthus pseudoscaposus L.B.Sm.
- Rokautskyia roberto-kautskyi (Leme) Leme, S.Heller & Zizka, syn. Cryptanthus roberto-kautskyi Leme
- Rokautskyia sanctaluciae (Leme & L.Kollmann) Leme, S.Heller & Zizka, syn. Cryptanthus sanctaluciae Leme & L.Kollmann
- Rokautskyia scaposa (E.Pereira) Leme, S.Heller & Zizka, syn. Cryptanthus scaposus E.Pereira
- Rokautskyia whitmanii (Leme) Leme, S.Heller & Zizka, syn. Cryptanthus whitmanii Leme
