= Cryptanthus maritimus =

Scientific classification
- Kingdom: Plantae
- Clade: Tracheophytes
- Clade: Angiosperms
- Clade: Monocots
- Clade: Commelinids
- Order: Poales
- Family: Bromeliaceae
- Genus: Cryptanthus
- Species: C. maritimus

Binomial name
- Cryptanthus maritimus L.B.Sm.

Species of flowering plant

Cryptanthus maritimus is a plant species in the genus Cryptanthus. This species is endemic to Brazil.

== Cultivars ==
- Cryptanthus 'Bosun's Mate'
- Cryptanthus 'Green Fountain'
- Cryptanthus 'Marimist Kay'
- Cryptanthus 'Maritime'
- Cryptanthus 'Tiny Treat'
