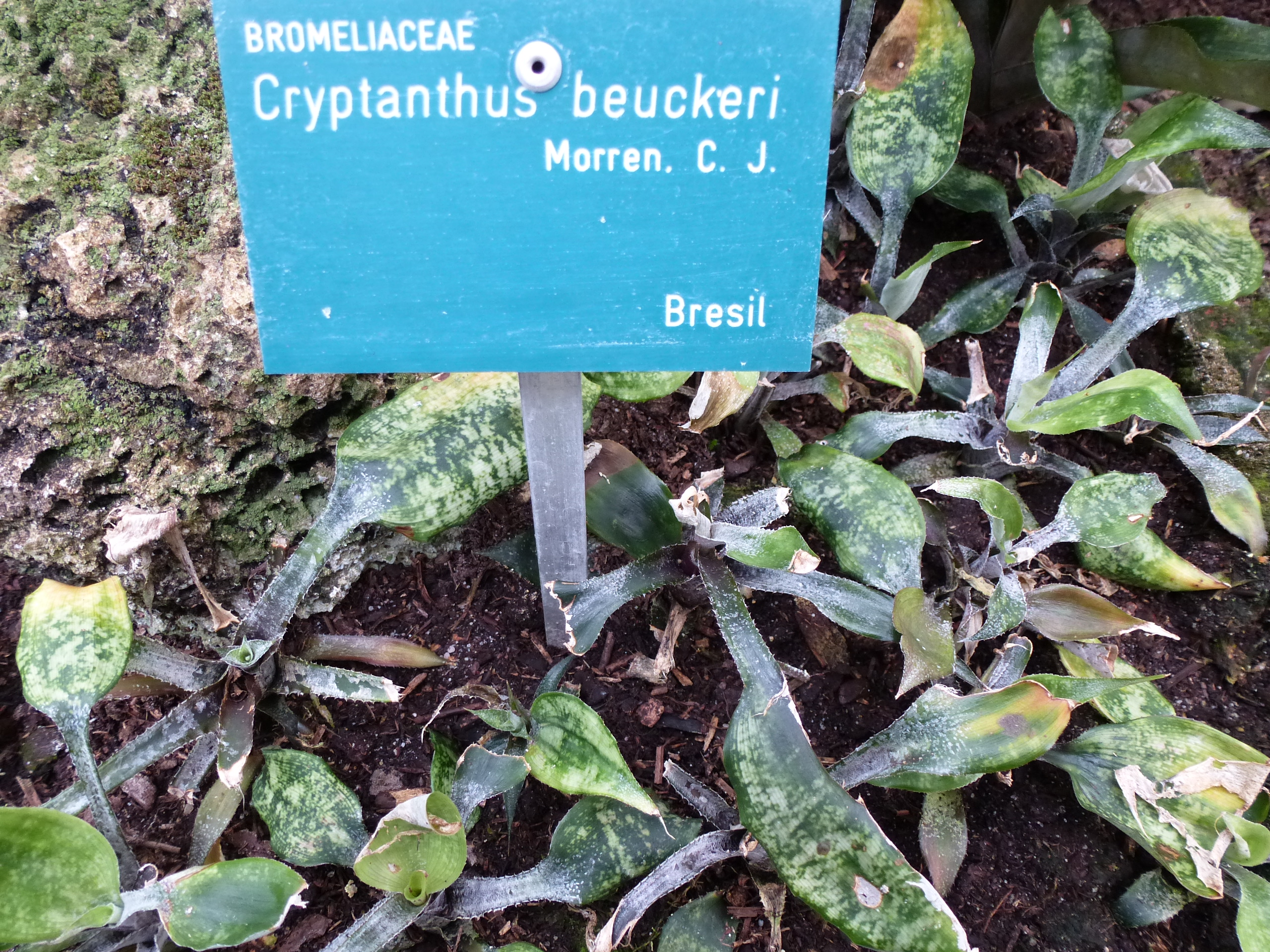

Scientific classification
- Kingdom: Plantae
- Clade: Tracheophytes
- Clade: Angiosperms
- Clade: Monocots
- Clade: Commelinids
- Order: Poales
- Family: Bromeliaceae
- Genus: Cryptanthus
- Species: C. beuckeri

Binomial name
- Cryptanthus beuckeri E.Morren

= Cryptanthus beuckeri =

Species of flowering plant

Cryptanthus beuckeri is a plant species in the genus Cryptanthus. This species is endemic to Brazil.

== Cultivars ==
- Cryptanthus 'Autumn Glow'
- Cryptanthus 'Betty Garrison'
- Cryptanthus 'Calypso'
- Cryptanthus 'Fred Ross'
- Cryptanthus 'Kashmir'
- Cryptanthus 'Little Bunniss'
- Cryptanthus 'Marble'
- Cryptanthus 'Marbled Spoon'
- Cryptanthus 'Mini Mocha Mint'
- Cryptanthus 'Mirabilis'
- Cryptanthus 'Monty' x beuckeri
- Cryptanthus 'Night Fall'
- Cryptanthus 'Osyanus'
- Cryptanthus 'Robert Read'
- Cryptanthus 'Soft Bronze'
- Cryptanthus 'Wild Marble'
- × Cryptbergia 'Hombre'
- × Cryptbergia 'Mead'
- × Cryptbergia 'Pinkie'
- × Cryptmea 'Dazzler'
- × Neotanthus 'Cafe Au Lait'
- × Neotanthus 'Sterling'
