= Cryptanthus colnagoi =

Scientific classification
- Kingdom: Plantae
- Clade: Tracheophytes
- Clade: Angiosperms
- Clade: Monocots
- Clade: Commelinids
- Order: Poales
- Family: Bromeliaceae
- Genus: Cryptanthus
- Species: C. colnagoi

Binomial name
- Cryptanthus colnagoi Rauh & Leme

Species of flowering plant

Cryptanthus colnagoi is a plant species in the genus Cryptanthus. This species is native to Brazil.

== Cultivars ==
- Cryptanthus 'Fred Ross'
- Cryptanthus 'Pixie'
- Cryptanthus 'Tabasco'
- Cryptanthus 'Thelma O'Reilly'
