= Cryptanthus delicatus =

- Cryptanthus growing in a garden in Brazil

Scientific classification
- Kingdom: Plantae
- Clade: Tracheophytes
- Clade: Angiosperms
- Clade: Monocots
- Clade: Commelinids
- Order: Poales
- Family: Bromeliaceae
- Genus: Cryptanthus
- Species: C. delicatus

Binomial name
- Cryptanthus delicatus Leme

Species of flowering plant

Cryptanthus delicatus is a plant species in the genus Cryptanthus. This species is endemic to Brazil. The plant can grow up to 6–12 in. (15-30 cm.).

== Origins ==
The plant was found in Brazil by an unknown explorer.
