= Cryptanthus osiris =

Scientific classification
- Kingdom: Plantae
- Clade: Tracheophytes
- Clade: Angiosperms
- Clade: Monocots
- Clade: Commelinids
- Order: Poales
- Family: Bromeliaceae
- Genus: Cryptanthus
- Species: C. osiris

Binomial name
- Cryptanthus osiris W.Weber

Species of flowering plant

Cryptanthus osiris is a plant species in the genus Cryptanthus. This species is native to Brazil.

== Cultivars ==
- Cryptanthus 'Rainbow Star'
