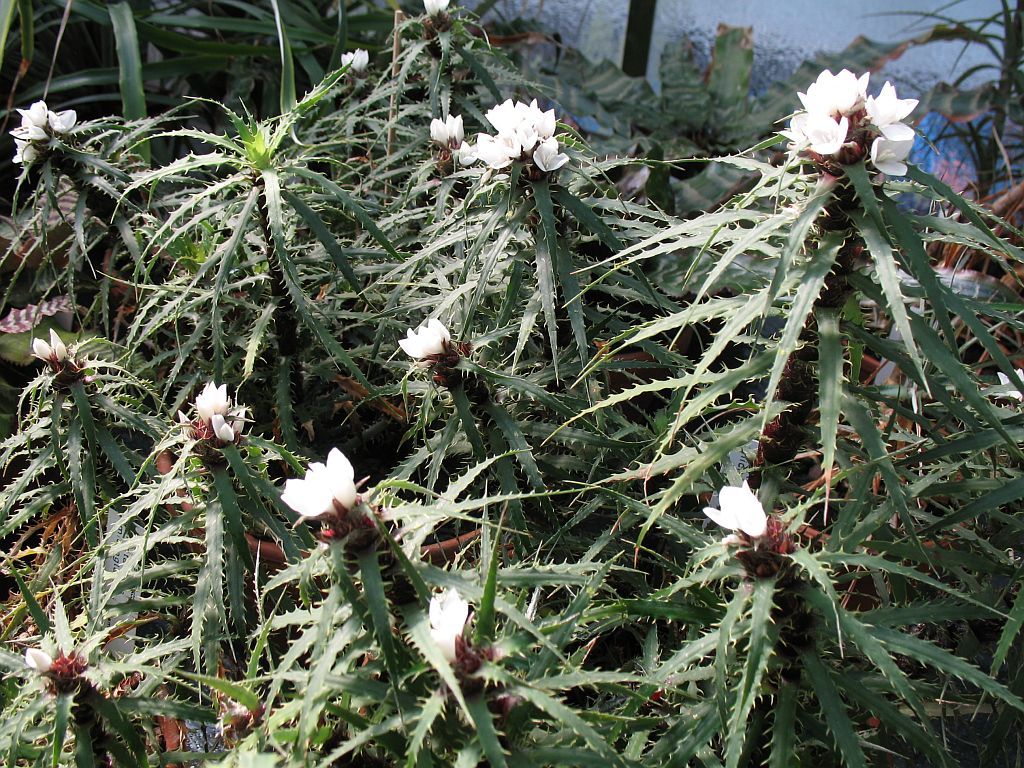

Scientific classification
- Kingdom: Plantae
- Clade: Tracheophytes
- Clade: Angiosperms
- Clade: Monocots
- Clade: Commelinids
- Order: Poales
- Family: Bromeliaceae
- Subfamily: Bromelioideae
- Genus: Rokautskyia
- Species: R. microglazioui

Binomial name
- Rokautskyia microglazioui (I.Ramírez) Leme, S.Heller & Zizka

Synonyms
- Cryptanthus microglazioui I.Ramírez

= Rokautskyia microglazioui =

Species of flowering plant

Rokautskyia microglazioui is a species of flowering plant in the family Bromeliaceae, endemic to Brazil (the state of Espírito Santo). It was first described in 1998 as Cryptanthus microglazioui. It is found in the Brazilian Atlantic Forest ecoregion.
