= Rokautskyia exaltata =

Scientific classification
- Kingdom: Plantae
- Clade: Tracheophytes
- Clade: Angiosperms
- Clade: Monocots
- Clade: Commelinids
- Order: Poales
- Family: Bromeliaceae
- Genus: Rokautskyia
- Species: R. exaltata

Binomial name
- Rokautskyia exaltata (H.Luther) Leme, S.Heller & Zizka

Synonyms
- Cryptanthus exaltatus H.Luther

Species of flowering plant

Rokautskyia exaltata is a species of flowering plant in the family Bromeliaceae, endemic to Brazil (the state of Espírito Santo). It was first described by Harry Edward Luther in 1990 as Cryptanthus exaltatus. It is listed as endangered by the Centro Nacional de Conservação da Flora.
