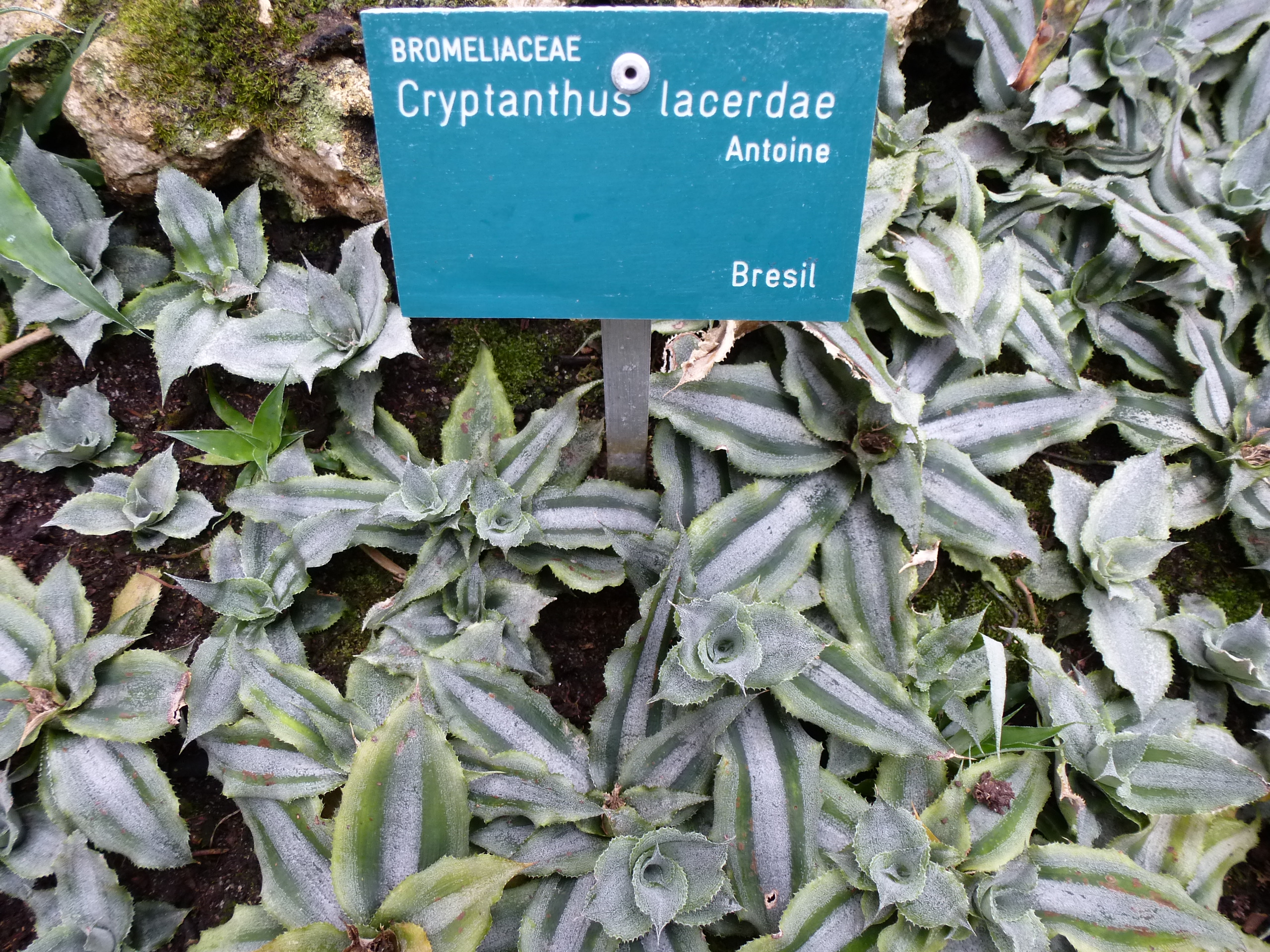

Scientific classification
- Kingdom: Plantae
- Clade: Tracheophytes
- Clade: Angiosperms
- Clade: Monocots
- Clade: Commelinids
- Order: Poales
- Family: Bromeliaceae
- Genus: Cryptanthus
- Species: C. lacerdae

Binomial name
- Cryptanthus lacerdae Antoine

= Cryptanthus lacerdae =

Species of flowering plant

Cryptanthus lacerdae is a plant species in the genus Cryptanthus. This species is endemic to Brazil.

== Cultivars ==
- Cryptanthus 'Icy'
- Cryptanthus 'Mars'
- Cryptanthus 'Menescal'
- Cryptanthus 'Osyanus'
- Cryptanthus Stirling Silver
- Cryptanthus 'Zebra'
- xNeotanthus 'Tom Montgomery'
