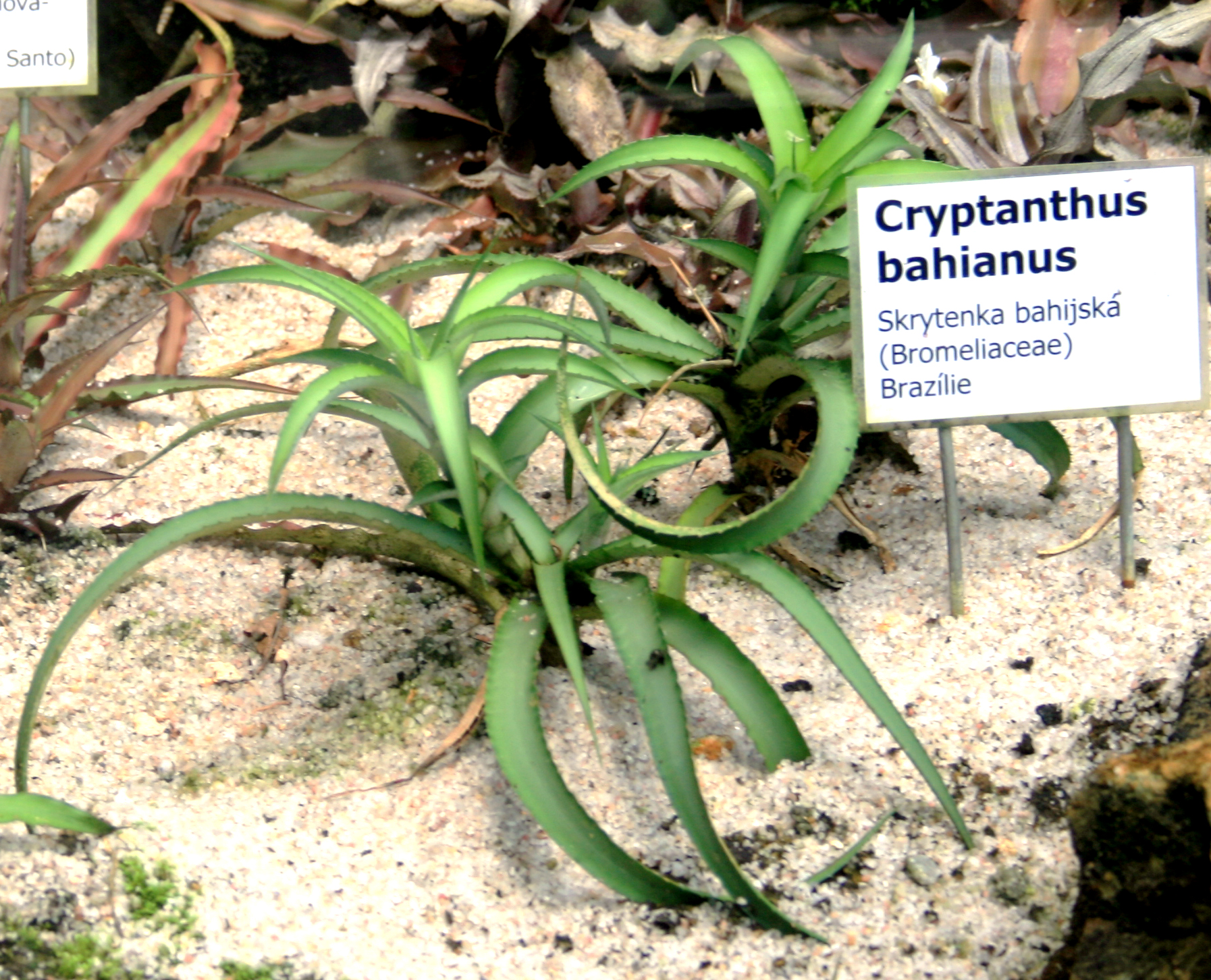

Scientific classification
- Kingdom: Plantae
- Clade: Tracheophytes
- Clade: Angiosperms
- Clade: Monocots
- Clade: Commelinids
- Order: Poales
- Family: Bromeliaceae
- Genus: Cryptanthus
- Species: C. bahianus

Binomial name
- Cryptanthus bahianus L.B.Sm.

= Cryptanthus bahianus =

Species of flowering plant

Cryptanthus bahianus is a plant species in the genus Cryptanthus.

== Cultivars ==
- Cryptanthus 'Autumn Glow'
- Cryptanthus 'Blonde'
- Cryptanthus 'Jean Stagner'
- Cryptanthus 'Lubbersianus'
- Cryptanthus 'Pie Crust'
- Cryptanthus 'Purple Whirl'
- × Cryptbergia 'Red Burst'
- × Cryptbergia 'Rubra'
