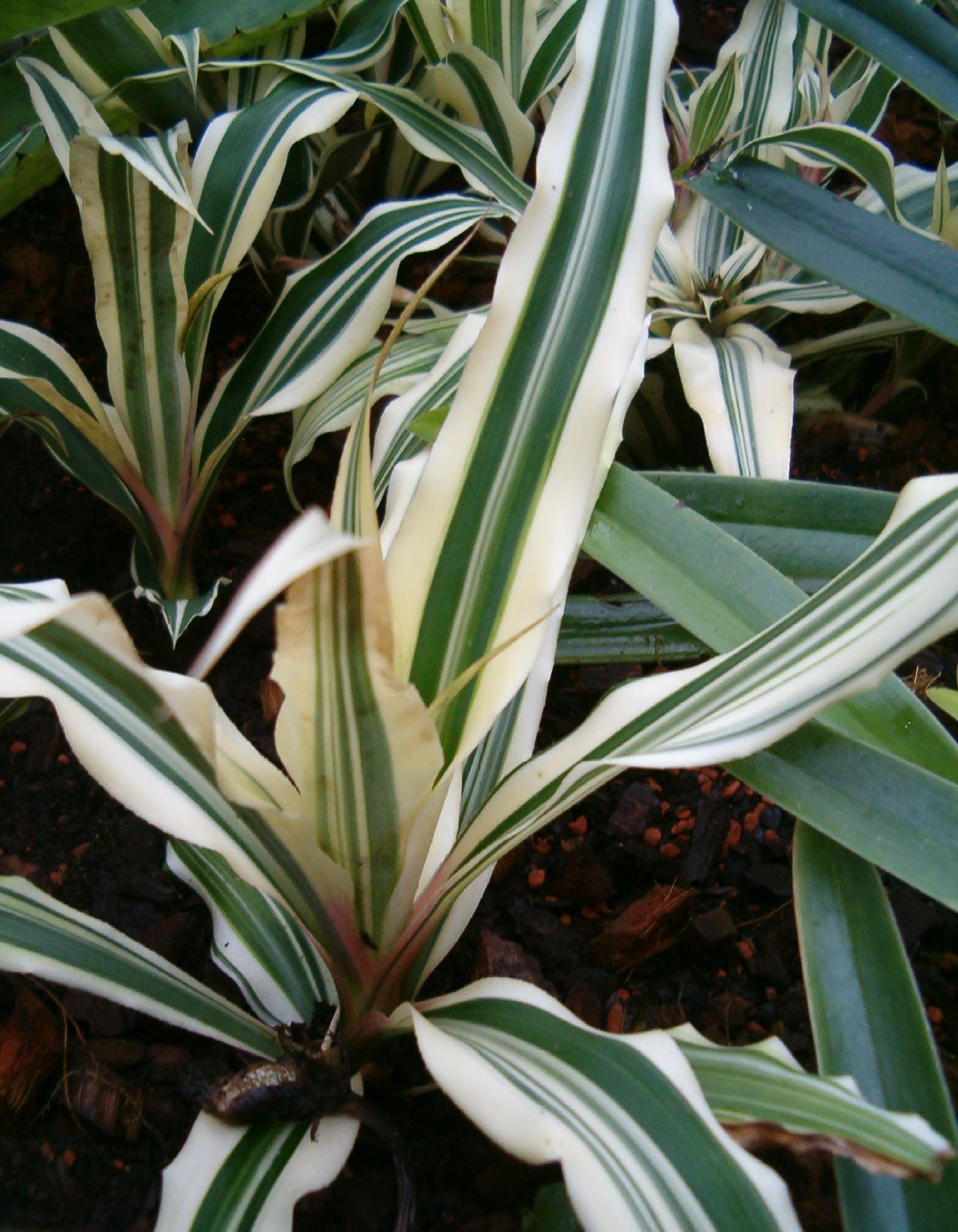

Scientific classification
- Kingdom: Plantae
- Clade: Tracheophytes
- Clade: Angiosperms
- Clade: Monocots
- Clade: Commelinids
- Order: Poales
- Family: Bromeliaceae
- Genus: Cryptanthus
- Species: C. bromelioides

Binomial name
- Cryptanthus bromelioides Otto & Dietrich

= Cryptanthus bromelioides =

Species of flowering plant

Cryptanthus bromelioides is a plant species in the genus Cryptanthus. This species is endemic to Brazil.

== Cultivars ==
- Cryptanthus 'Red Hot'
- Cryptanthus 'Uluwehi'
- Cryptanthus 'Wendy'
- × Neotanthus 'Charlien Rose'

== Bibliography ==
- Mathews, V. Helena; Rao, P. S. (1982). "In vitro plant regeneration in lateral bud explants of Cryptanthus bromelioides Var. Tricolor M. B. Foster". Plant Cell Reports. 1 (3): 108–110. doi:10.1007/BF00272365. ISSN 0721-7714.
- Pierce, Simon; Winter, Klaus; Griffiths, Howard (2002). "Carbon isotope ratio and the extent of daily CAM use by Bromeliaceae". New Phytologist. 156 (1): 75–83. doi:10.1046/j.1469-8137.2002.00489.x. ISSN 0028-646X.
- Koh, Yong Cheong; Davies, Fred T. (1997). "Micropropagation of Cryptanthus with leaf explants with attached intercalary meristems excised from greenhouse stock plants". Scientia Horticulturae. 70 (4): 301–307. doi:10.1016/S0304-4238(97)00076-9. ISSN 0304-4238.
