= Rokautskyia pseudoglaziovii =

Scientific classification
- Kingdom: Plantae
- Clade: Tracheophytes
- Clade: Angiosperms
- Clade: Monocots
- Clade: Commelinids
- Order: Poales
- Family: Bromeliaceae
- Subfamily: Bromelioideae
- Genus: Rokautskyia
- Species: R. pseudoglaziovii

Binomial name
- Rokautskyia pseudoglaziovii (Leme) Leme, S.Heller & Zizka

Synonyms
- Cryptanthus pseudoglaziovii Leme

Species of flowering plant

Rokautskyia pseudoglaziovii is a species of flowering plant in the family Bromeliaceae, endemic to Brazil (the state of Espírito Santo). It was first described in 1991 as Cryptanthus pseudoglaziovii. The epithet is also spelt pseudoglazioui.
