= Rokautskyia caulescens =

Scientific classification
- Kingdom: Plantae
- Clade: Tracheophytes
- Clade: Angiosperms
- Clade: Monocots
- Clade: Commelinids
- Order: Poales
- Family: Bromeliaceae
- Subfamily: Bromelioideae
- Genus: Rokautskyia
- Species: R. caulescens

Binomial name
- Rokautskyia caulescens (I.Ramírez) Leme, S.Heller & Zizka

Synonyms
- Cryptanthus caulescens I.Ramírez

Species of flowering plant

Rokautskyia caulescens is a species of flowering plant in the family Bromeliaceae, endemic to Brazil (the states of Bahia and Espírito Santo). It was first described in 1998 as Cryptanthus caulescens.
