= Cryptanthus minarum =

Scientific classification
- Kingdom: Plantae
- Clade: Tracheophytes
- Clade: Angiosperms
- Clade: Monocots
- Clade: Commelinids
- Order: Poales
- Family: Bromeliaceae
- Genus: Cryptanthus
- Species: C. minarum

Binomial name
- Cryptanthus minarum L.B.Sm.

Species of flowering plant

Cryptanthus minarum is a plant species in the genus Cryptanthus. This species is endemic to Brazil.
