= Hoplocryptanthus schwackeanus =

Scientific classification
- Kingdom: Plantae
- Clade: Embryophytes
- Clade: Tracheophytes
- Clade: Spermatophytes
- Clade: Angiosperms
- Clade: Monocots
- Clade: Commelinids
- Order: Poales
- Family: Bromeliaceae
- Subfamily: Bromelioideae
- Genus: Hoplocryptanthus
- Species: H. schwackeanus

Binomial name
- Hoplocryptanthus schwackeanus (Mez) Leme, S.Heller & Zizka

Synonyms
- Cryptanthus schwackeanus Mez

Species of flowering plant

Hoplocryptanthus schwackeanus is a species of flowering plant in the family Bromeliaceae, endemic to Brazil (the states of Minas Gerais and São Paulo). It was first described by Carl Christian Mez in 1891 as Cryptanthus schwackeanus.
