= Hoplocryptanthus lavrasensis =

Scientific classification
- Kingdom: Plantae
- Clade: Tracheophytes
- Clade: Angiosperms
- Clade: Monocots
- Clade: Commelinids
- Order: Poales
- Family: Bromeliaceae
- Subfamily: Bromelioideae
- Genus: Hoplocryptanthus
- Species: H. lavrasensis

Binomial name
- Hoplocryptanthus lavrasensis (Leme) Leme, S.Heller & Zizka

Synonyms
- Cryptanthus lavrasensis Leme

Species of flowering plant

Hoplocryptanthus lavrasensis is a species of flowering plant in the family Bromeliaceae, endemic to Brazil (the state of Minas Gerais). It was first described in 2007 by Elton Leme as Cryptanthus lavrasensis.
