= Cryptanthus seidelianus =

Scientific classification
- Kingdom: Plantae
- Clade: Tracheophytes
- Clade: Angiosperms
- Clade: Monocots
- Clade: Commelinids
- Order: Poales
- Family: Bromeliaceae
- Genus: Cryptanthus
- Species: C. seidelianus

Binomial name
- Cryptanthus seidelianus W.Weber

Species of flowering plant

Cryptanthus seidelianus (common name: Earth star) is a plant species in the genus Cryptanthus. This species is endemic to Brazil.
