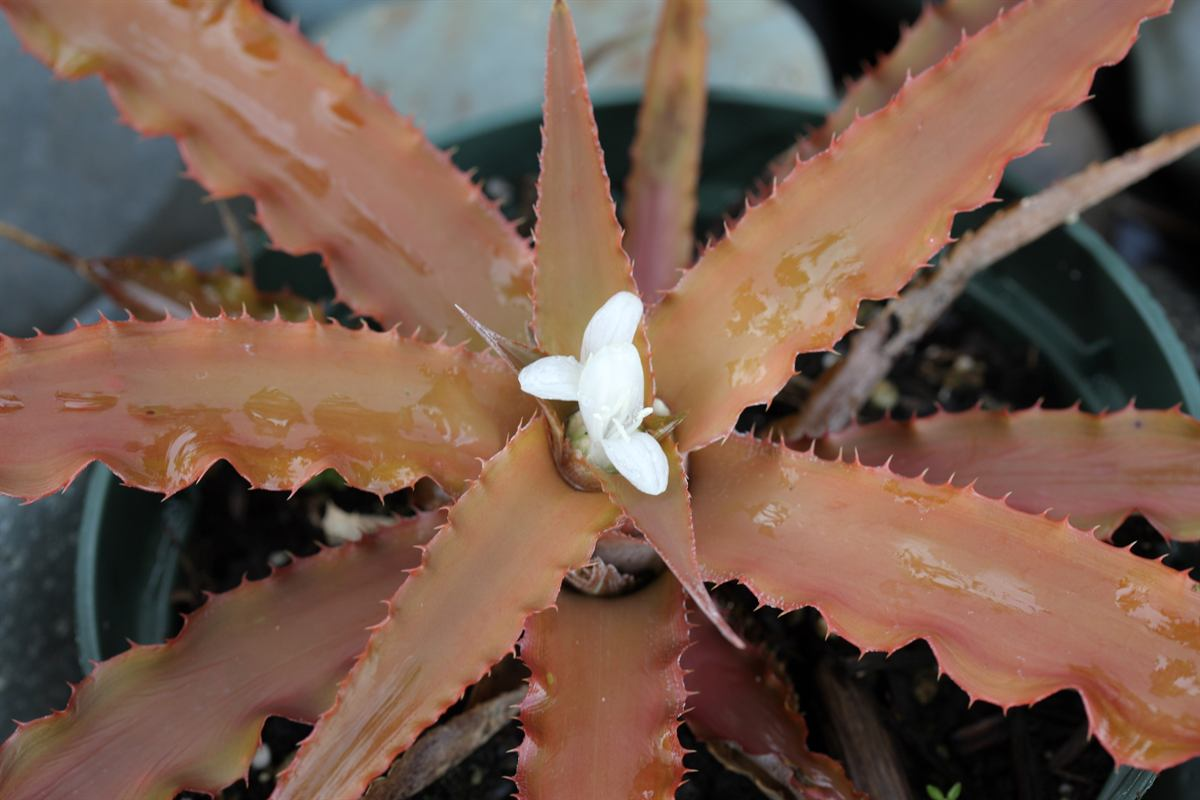

Scientific classification
- Kingdom: Plantae
- Clade: Tracheophytes
- Clade: Angiosperms
- Clade: Monocots
- Clade: Commelinids
- Order: Poales
- Family: Bromeliaceae
- Genus: Cryptanthus
- Species: C. warren-loosei

Binomial name
- Cryptanthus warren-loosei Leme

= Cryptanthus warren-loosei =

Species of flowering plant

Cryptanthus warren-loosei is a plant species in the genus Cryptanthus. This species is endemic to Brazil.

== Cultivars ==
- Cryptanthus 'Pickel'
- Cryptanthus 'Soerries'
