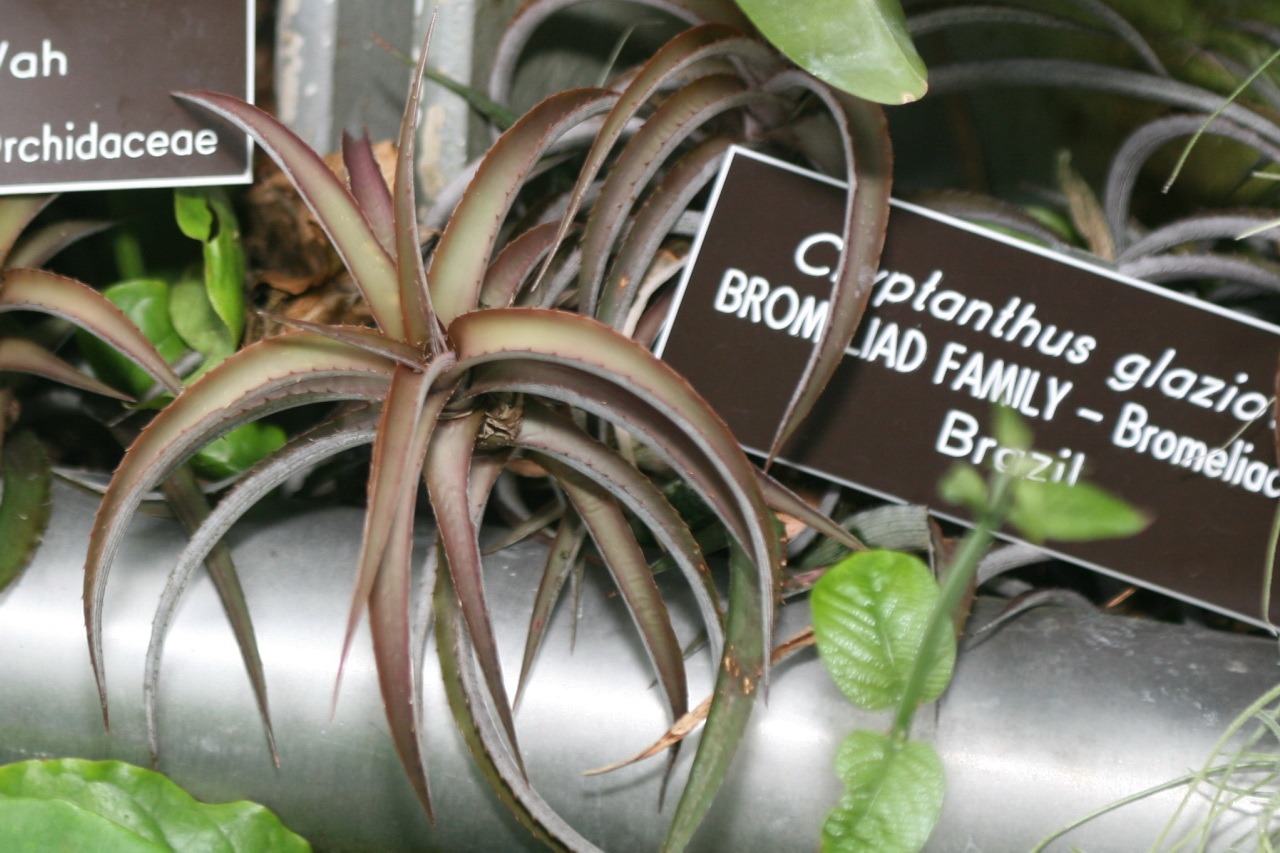

Scientific classification
- Kingdom: Plantae
- Clade: Embryophytes
- Clade: Tracheophytes
- Clade: Spermatophytes
- Clade: Angiosperms
- Clade: Monocots
- Clade: Commelinids
- Order: Poales
- Family: Bromeliaceae
- Subfamily: Bromelioideae
- Genus: Hoplocryptanthus
- Species: H. glaziovii

Binomial name
- Hoplocryptanthus glaziovii (Mez) Leme, S.Heller & Zizka

Synonyms
- Cryptanthus glaziovii Mez

= Hoplocryptanthus glaziovii =

Species of flowering plant

Hoplocryptanthus glaziovii is a species of flowering plant in the family Bromeliaceae, endemic to Brazil (the state of Minas Gerais). It was first described by Carl Christian Mez in 1891 as Cryptanthus glaziovii. It is found in the Brazilian Atlantic Forest ecoregion.
