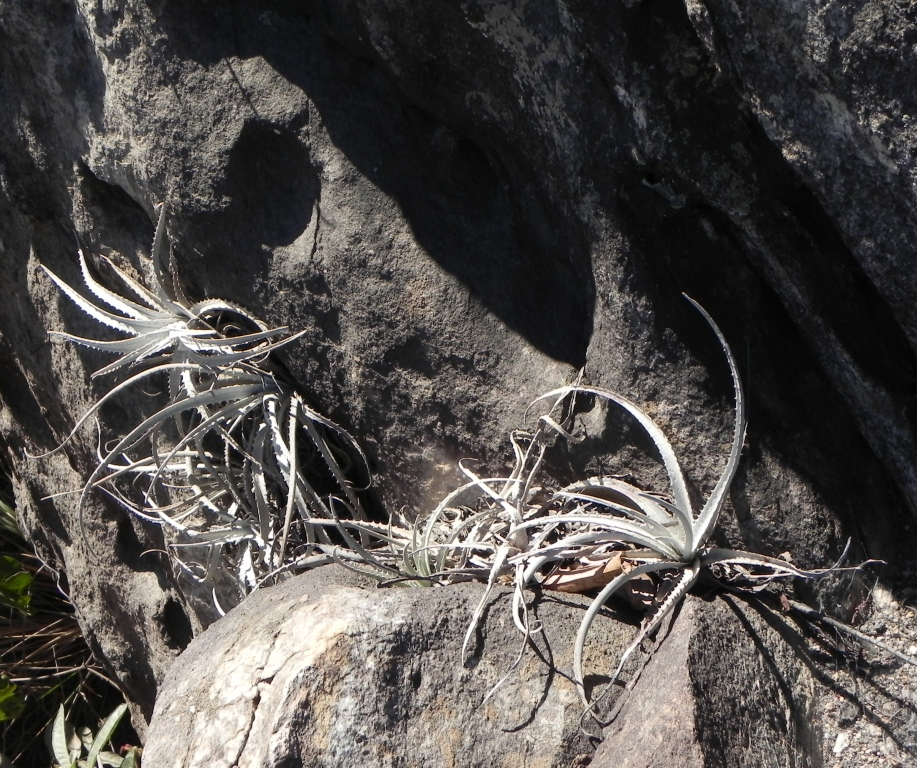

Scientific classification
- Kingdom: Plantae
- Clade: Tracheophytes
- Clade: Angiosperms
- Clade: Monocots
- Clade: Commelinids
- Order: Poales
- Family: Bromeliaceae
- Genus: Forzzaea
- Species: F. leopoldo-horstii

Binomial name
- Forzzaea leopoldo-horstii (Rauh) Leme, S.Heller & Zizka

= Forzzaea leopoldo-horstii =

Species of flowering plant

Forzzaea leopoldo-horstii is a plant species in the genus Forzzaea. This species is endemic to Brazil.
