= Rokautskyia sanctaluciae =

Scientific classification
- Kingdom: Plantae
- Clade: Tracheophytes
- Clade: Angiosperms
- Clade: Monocots
- Clade: Commelinids
- Order: Poales
- Family: Bromeliaceae
- Subfamily: Bromelioideae
- Genus: Rokautskyia
- Species: R. sanctaluciae

Binomial name
- Rokautskyia sanctaluciae (Leme & L.Kollmann) Leme, S.Heller & Zizka

Synonyms
- Cryptanthus sanctaluciae Leme & L.Kollmann

Species of flowering plant

Rokautskyia sanctaluciae is a species of flowering plant in the family Bromeliaceae, endemic to Brazil (the state of Espírito Santo). It was first described in 2008 as Cryptanthus sanctaluciae.
