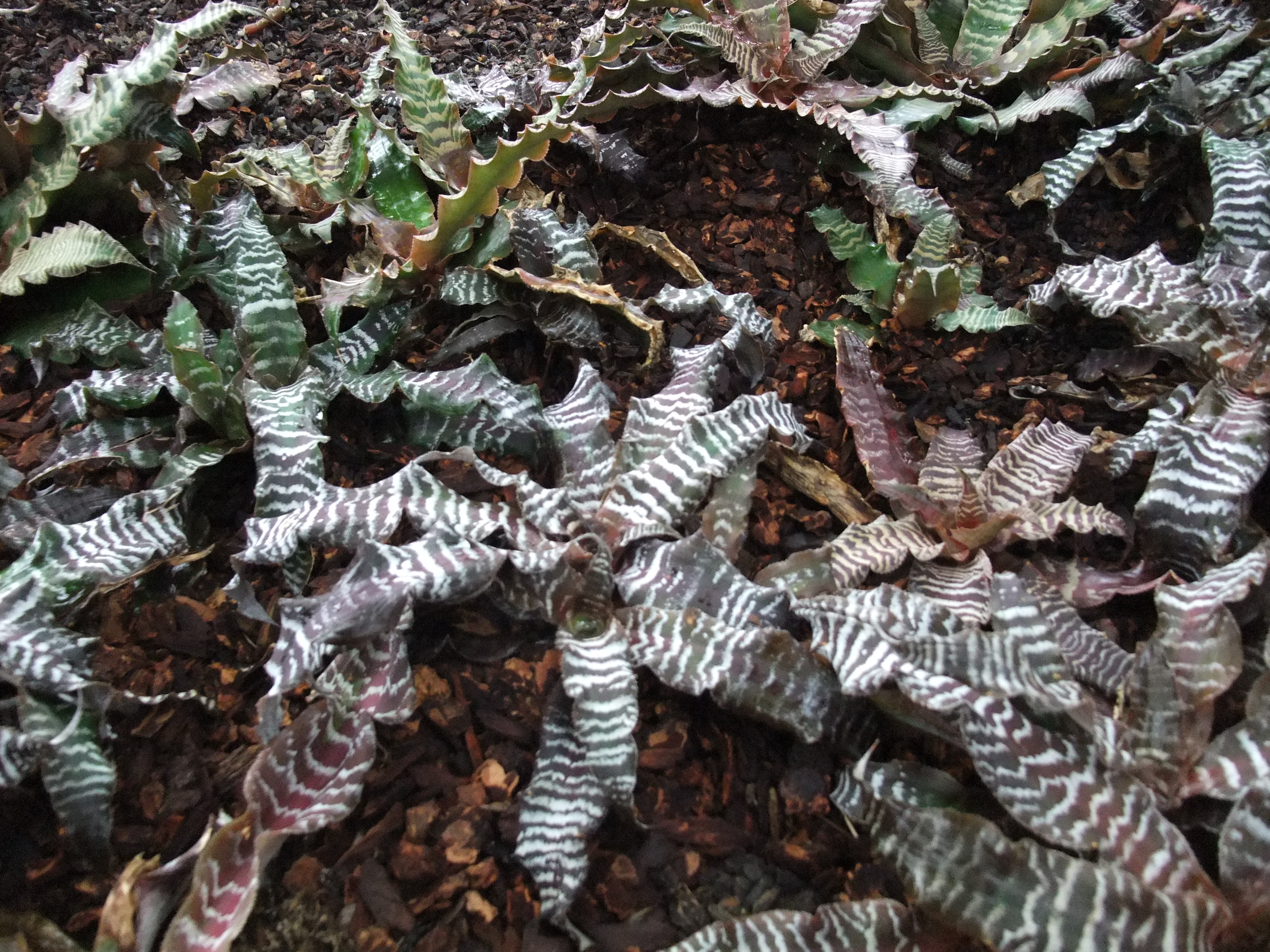
- Cryptanthus zonatus 'Zebrinus'

Scientific classification
- Kingdom: Plantae
- Clade: Tracheophytes
- Clade: Angiosperms
- Clade: Monocots
- Clade: Commelinids
- Order: Poales
- Family: Bromeliaceae
- Genus: Cryptanthus
- Species: C. zonatus

Binomial name
- Cryptanthus zonatus (Visiani) Beer

= Cryptanthus zonatus =

Species of flowering plant

Cryptanthus zonatus is a plant species in the genus Cryptanthus. This species is endemic to Brazil.

== Cultivars ==
- Cryptanthus 'Blushing Zebra'
- Cryptanthus 'Cochleatus'
- Cryptanthus 'Green Edge Kay'
- Cryptanthus 'Koning'
- Cryptanthus 'Nivea'
- Cryptanthus 'Pie Crust'
- Cryptanthus 'Salamanca'
- Cryptanthus 'Zebrinus'
