= Hoplocryptanthus tiradentesensis =

Scientific classification
- Kingdom: Plantae
- Clade: Tracheophytes
- Clade: Angiosperms
- Clade: Monocots
- Clade: Commelinids
- Order: Poales
- Family: Bromeliaceae
- Subfamily: Bromelioideae
- Genus: Hoplocryptanthus
- Species: H. tiradentesensis

Binomial name
- Hoplocryptanthus tiradentesensis (Leme) Leme, S.Heller & Zizka

Synonyms
- Cryptanthus tiradentesensis Leme

Species of flowering plant

Hoplocryptanthus tiradentesensis is a species of flowering plant in the family Bromeliaceae, endemic to Brazil (the state of Minas Gerais). It was first described by Leme in 2007 as Cryptanthus tiradentesensis.
