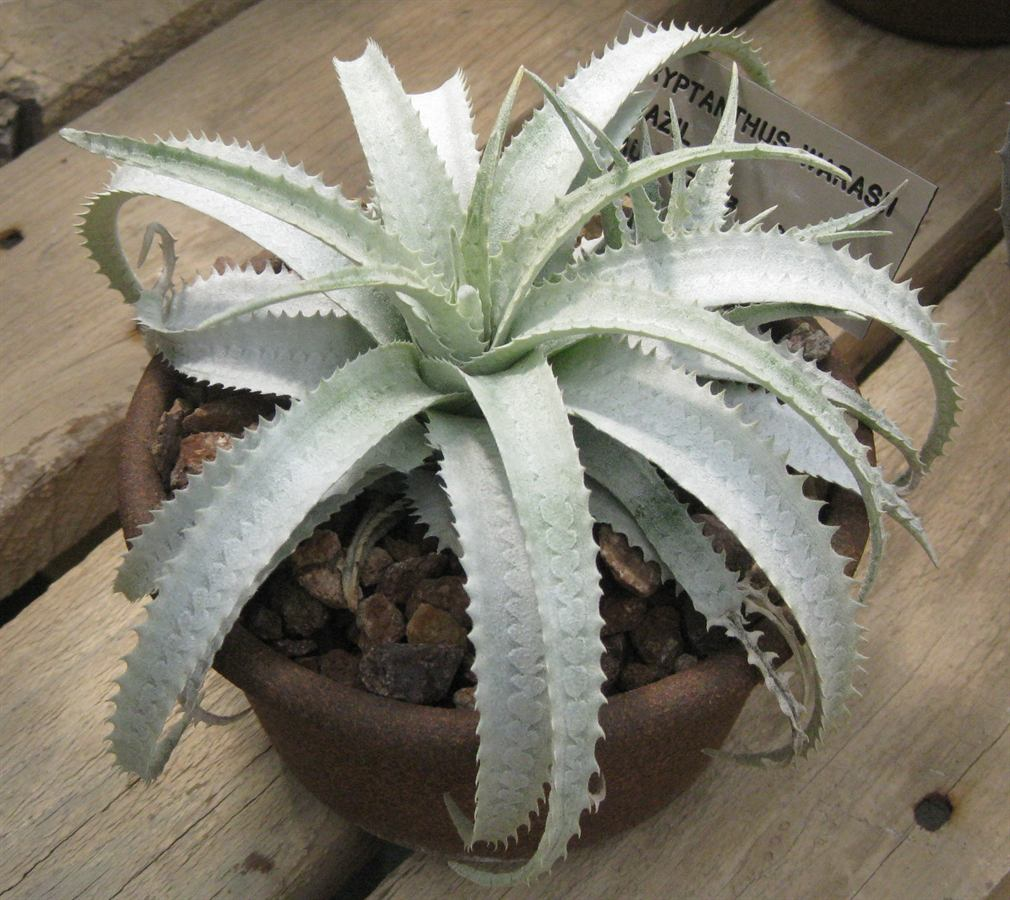
- Forzzaea warasii here labeled as Cryptanthus warasii

Scientific classification
- Kingdom: Plantae
- Clade: Tracheophytes
- Clade: Angiosperms
- Clade: Monocots
- Clade: Commelinids
- Order: Poales
- Family: Bromeliaceae
- Subfamily: Bromelioideae
- Genus: Forzzaea; Leme, S.Heller & Zizka

Species
- See text

= Forzzaea =

Genus of Bromeliaceae plants

Forzzaea is a genus of eu-bromelioids in the family Bromeliaceae, native to the Atlantic coastal forest of Brazil, and described in 2017.

== Species ==
Currently accepted species include:

- Forzzaea coutensis Leme & O.B.C. Ribeiro
- Forzzaea flavipetala Leme & O.B.C. Ribeiro
- Forzzaea leopoldo-horstii (Rauh) Leme, S.Heller & Zizka
- Forzzaea micra (Louzada, Wand. & Versieux) Leme, S.Heller & Zizka
- Forzzaea pseudomicra Leme & O.B.C. Ribeiro
- Forzzaea viridifolia Leme & O.B.C. Ribeiro
- Forzzaea warasii (E.Pereira) Leme, S.Heller & Zizka
