= Cryptanthus marginatus =

Scientific classification
- Kingdom: Plantae
- Clade: Tracheophytes
- Clade: Angiosperms
- Clade: Monocots
- Clade: Commelinids
- Order: Poales
- Family: Bromeliaceae
- Genus: Cryptanthus
- Species: C. marginatus

Binomial name
- Cryptanthus marginatus L.B.Sm.

Species of flowering plant

Cryptanthus marginatus is a species in the genus Cryptanthus. This species is endemic to Brazil.

== Cultivars ==
- Cryptanthus 'Arlety'
- Cryptanthus 'Atahualpa'
- Cryptanthus 'Beau Brummel'
- Cryptanthus 'Bivittatus-Grande'
- Cryptanthus 'Bivittatus-Lueddemanniana'
- Cryptanthus 'Bivittatus-Major'
- Cryptanthus 'Brown Soldier'
- Cryptanthus 'Burnt Offering'
- Cryptanthus 'Coffee Royal'
- Cryptanthus 'Covergirl'
- Cryptanthus 'Dark Fire'
- Cryptanthus 'Florence'
- Cryptanthus 'Green Lueddemannii'
- Cryptanthus 'Greyling'
- Cryptanthus 'Hurricane'
- Cryptanthus 'Hush'
- Cryptanthus 'Ingeborg Whitman'
- Cryptanthus 'Jeanie'
- Cryptanthus 'Juan 'N Only'
- Cryptanthus 'Lime 'N Tan'
- Cryptanthus 'Lueddemannii'
- Cryptanthus 'Major'
- Cryptanthus 'Mamma Mia'
- Cryptanthus 'Muriel Loose'
- Cryptanthus 'Paleface'
- Cryptanthus 'Rube'
- Cryptanthus 'Rubra'
- Cryptanthus 'Scotch Mist'
- Cryptanthus 'Soerries'
- Cryptanthus 'Spot Light'
- Cryptanthus 'Stars and Stripes'
- Cryptanthus 'Texas'
- Cryptanthus 'Tropiflora'
- Cryptanthus 'Yay'
- xCryptbergia 'Resplendent'
- xCryptbergia 'Tiger Eye'
