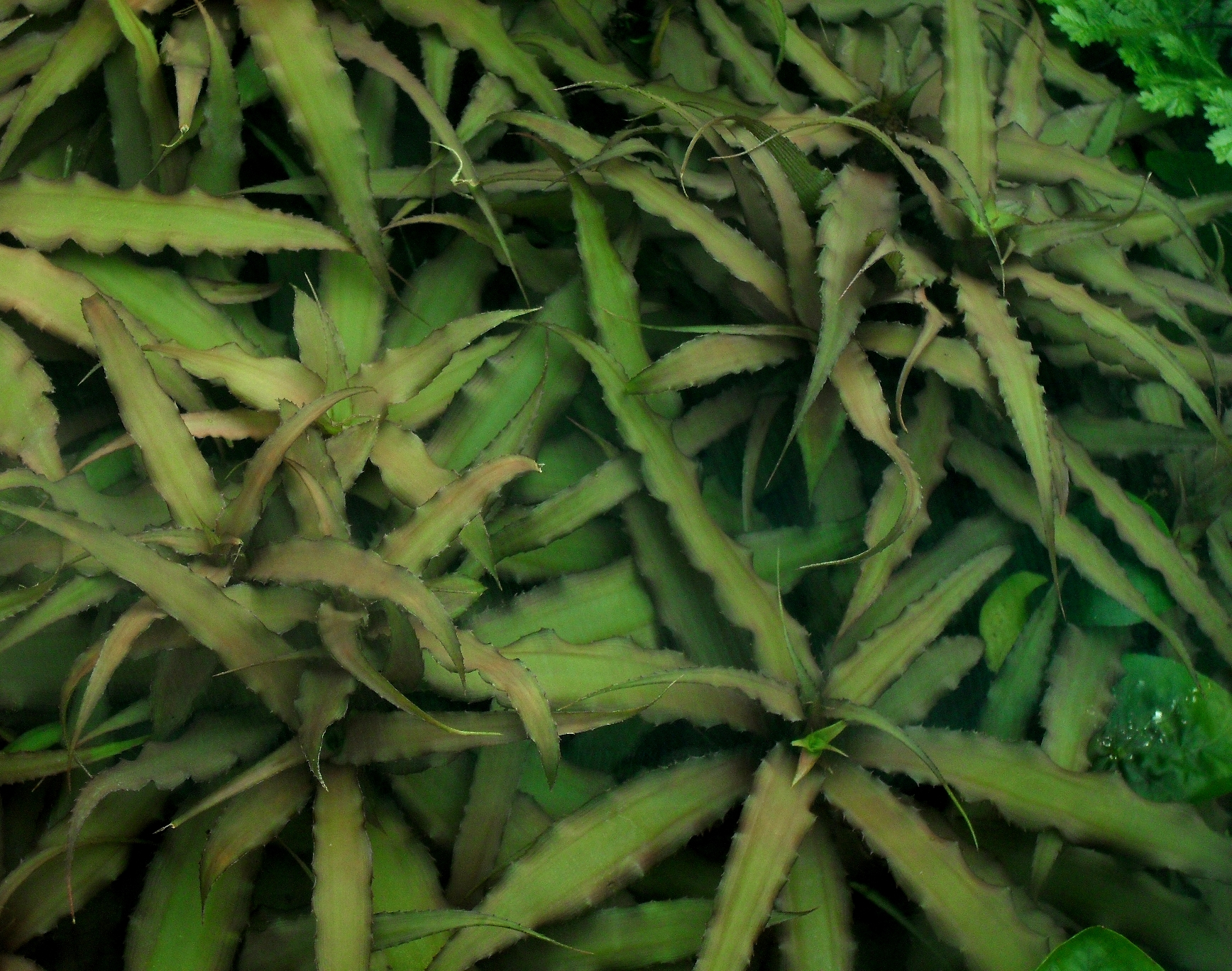

Scientific classification
- Kingdom: Plantae
- Clade: Tracheophytes
- Clade: Angiosperms
- Clade: Monocots
- Clade: Commelinids
- Order: Poales
- Family: Bromeliaceae
- Genus: Cryptanthus
- Species: C. acaulis

Binomial name
- Cryptanthus acaulis (Lindley) Beer

= Cryptanthus acaulis =

Species of flowering plant

Cryptanthus acaulis is a plant species in the genus Cryptanthus. This species is endemic to Brazil.

== Cultivars ==
- Cryptanthus 'Bivittato-Acaulis'
- Cryptanthus 'Cabo Frio Cabbage'
- Cryptanthus 'Cochleatus'
- Cryptanthus 'Grace'
- Cryptanthus 'Makoyanus'
- Cryptanthus 'Mary Jo'
- Cryptanthus 'Variegata'
- Cryptanthus 'Whirligig'
- × Neotanthus 'Ted Will'
