= Rokautskyia pseudoscaposa =

Scientific classification
- Kingdom: Plantae
- Clade: Tracheophytes
- Clade: Angiosperms
- Clade: Monocots
- Clade: Commelinids
- Order: Poales
- Family: Bromeliaceae
- Subfamily: Bromelioideae
- Genus: Rokautskyia
- Species: R. pseudoscaposa

Binomial name
- Rokautskyia pseudoscaposa (L.B.Sm.) Leme, S.Heller & Zizka

Synonyms
- Cryptanthus pseudoscaposus L.B.Sm.

Species of flowering plant

Rokautskyia pseudoscaposa is a species of flowering plant in the family Bromeliaceae, endemic to Brazil (the state of Espírito Santo). It was first described by Lyman Bradford Smith in 1955 as Cryptanthus pseudoscaposus.
