= Rokautskyia scaposa =

Scientific classification
- Kingdom: Plantae
- Clade: Tracheophytes
- Clade: Angiosperms
- Clade: Monocots
- Clade: Commelinids
- Order: Poales
- Family: Bromeliaceae
- Subfamily: Bromelioideae
- Genus: Rokautskyia
- Species: R. scaposa

Binomial name
- Rokautskyia scaposa (E.Pereira) Leme, S.Heller & Zizka

Synonyms
- Cryptanthus scaposus E.Pereira

Species of flowering plant

Rokautskyia scaposa is a species of flowering plant in the family Bromeliaceae, endemic to Brazil (the state of Espírito Santo). It was first described in 1978 as Cryptanthus scaposus.
