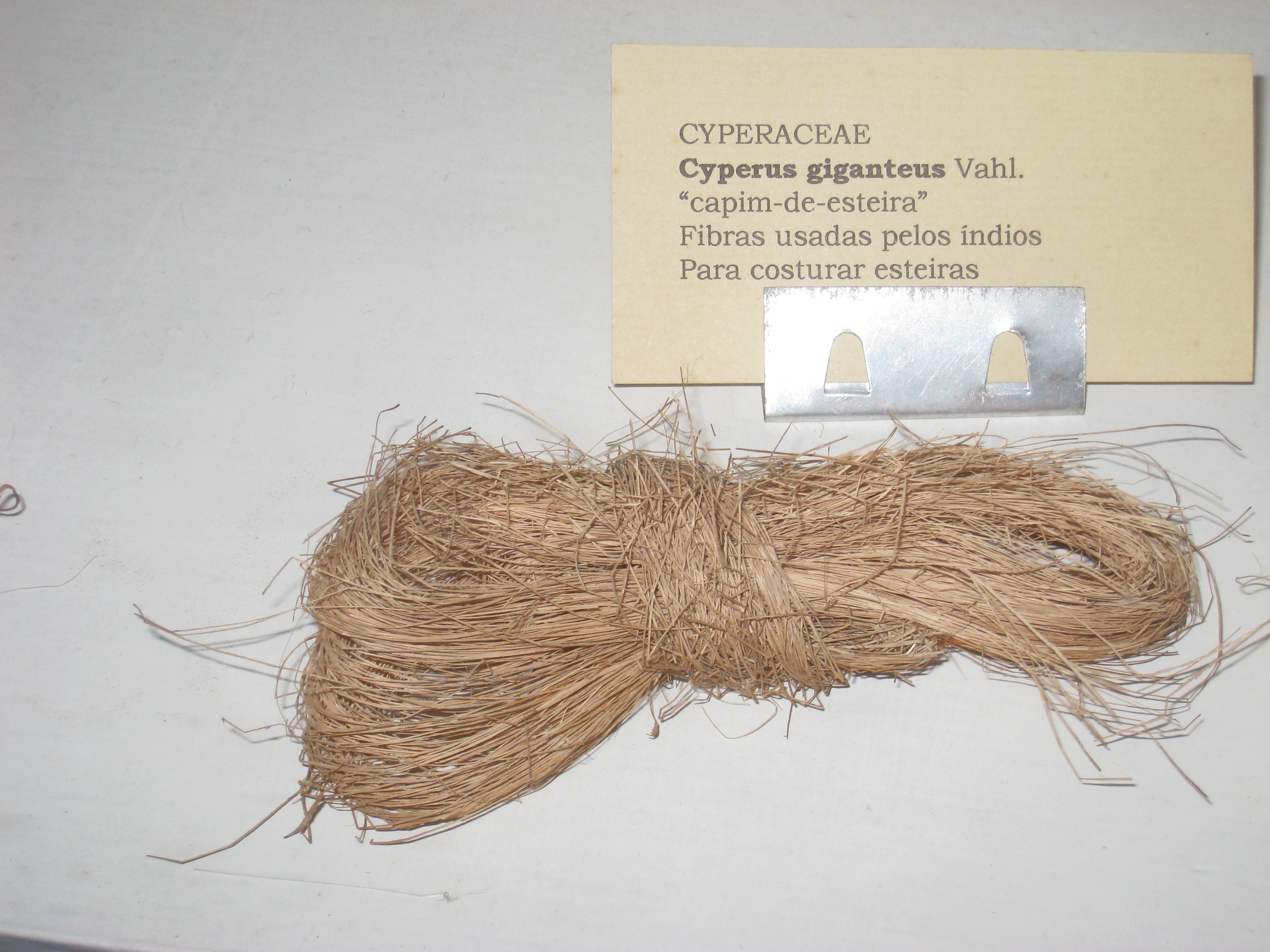

Scientific classification
- Kingdom: Plantae
- Clade: Tracheophytes
- Clade: Angiosperms
- Clade: Monocots
- Clade: Commelinids
- Order: Poales
- Family: Cyperaceae
- Genus: Cyperus
- Species: C. giganteus

Binomial name
- Cyperus giganteus Vahl

Synonyms
- Papyrus giganteus (Vahl) Schrad. ex Nees; Chlorocyperus giganteus (Vahl) Palla; Cyperus berteroi Kunth; Cyperus densiflorus Rchb. ex Kunth; Cyperus princeps Kunth; Papyrus elegans Schrad. ex Nees; Papyrus odoratus Willd. ex Nees; Papyrus spectabilis Schrad. ex Nees; Cyperus conspicuus Steud.; Cyperus elatus Griseb.

= Cyperus giganteus =

Piripiri

Species of plant

Cyperus giganteus (also known as piripiri) is a perennial herbaceous plant. It belongs to the genus Cyperus. Its native range extends from Jalisco in west-central Mexico as far south as Uruguay, and also grows on some islands in the Caribbean (Cuba, Hispaniola, Puerto Rico, Jamaica, and Trinidad). The species is sparingly naturalized in eastern Texas and southern Louisiana.

== Description ==
This species resembles the common papyrus Cyperus papyrus but has a much smaller umbel. It grows up to 4.5 m (15 ft) height.
