= Elton Leme =

Brazilian botanist

Elton Martinez Carvalho Leme
- Born: 1960 (age 65–66)
- Scientific career
- Fields: Law, Botany
- Author abbrev. (botany): Leme

Elton Martinez Carvalho Leme (born 1960) is a Brazilian who is employed as a judge. He is also a self-taught botanist with a special interest in bromeliads. As of November 2022, the International Plant Names Index listed 629 scientific names which include Leme as a publishing author, including 13 generic names.

== Some publications ==
=== Journal articles ===
- Leme, M.C. & de Paula, C.C. (2008), "Two new Alcantarea species from Minas Gerais, Brazil", Journal of the Bromeliad Society, 58 (1): 5–11
- Leme, M.C.; Kollmann, L.J.C. & Fontana, A.P. (2008), "Three new Cryptanthus species from Espírito Santo and Bahia, Brazil", Journal of the Bromeliad Society, 58 (1): 12–19
- Leme, M.C.; Till, W.; Brown, G.K.; Grant, J.R. & Govaerts, R. (2008), "Eduandrea, a new generic name for Andrea", Journal of the Bromeliad Society, 58 (2): 61–64
- Leme, M.C. & de Paula, C.C. (2008), "Studies on Orthophytum - Part VIII: Two new species from Grão Mogol State Park, Minas Gerais, Brazil", Journal of the Bromeliad Society, 58 (3): 106–117
- Brown, G.K.; Till, W.; Leme, E.M.C. & Grant, J.R. (2008), "A Review: Bromeliacea – Flora Fanerogamica do Estado de São Paulo", Journal of the Bromeliad Society, 58 (4): 159–162
- Leme, M.C.; Fraga, C.N.; Kollman, L.J.C. & Fontana, A.P. (2008), "Three new Alcantarea species from Espírito Santo and Minas Gerais, Brazil", Journal of the Bromeliad Society, 58 (5): 205–216
- Leme, M.C. (2008), "Studies on Orthophytum - Part IX. The "subcomplex mello-barretoi" and another new species", Journal of the Bromeliad Society, 58 (6): 257–261
- Leme, M.C. (2008), "A new Quesnelia species from Bahia", Journal of the Bromeliad Society, 58 (6): 269–271
- Peters, J.; Vásques, R.; Osinagaelton, A.; Leme, E.M.C.; Weising, K. & Ibish, P.L. (2008), "Towards a taxonomic revision of the genus Fosterella (Bromeliaceae)", Selbyana, 29: 182–194
- Amorim, A.M. & Leme, E.M.C. (2009), "Two new species of Quesnelia (Bromeliaceae: Bromelioideae) from the Atlantic Rainforest of Bahia, Brazil", Brittonia (Bronx), 61: 14–21, doi:10.1007/s12228-008-9049-5, S2CID 7982131
- Leme, M.C. (2009), "Alcantarea mucilaginosa, a new species from Espírito Santo", Journal of the Bromeliad Society, 59 (1): 12–15
- Leme, M.C. (2009), "Notes on Alcantarea: a new medium-sized species and additions to A. roberto-kautskyi", Journal of the Bromeliad Society, 59 (1): 19–27
- Leme, E.M.C.; Heller, S.; Zizka, G. & Halbritter, H. (2017), "New circumscription of Cryptanthus and new Cryptanthoid genera and subgenera (Bromeliaceae: Bromelioideae) based on neglected morphological traits and molecular phylogeny", Phytotaxa, 318 (1): 1–88, doi:10.11646/phytotaxa.318.1.1

=== Books ===
- Leme, Elton M.C. & Marigo, L.C. (1983), Bromelias na Natureza (in Portuguese), Rio de Janeiro: Marigo Comunicacao Visual
  English translation: Leme, Elton M.C.; Marigo, L.C. & Brisset, C. (1993), Bromeliads : in the Brazilian wilderness, Rio de Janeiro: Marigo Comunicacao Visual, ISBN 978-85-85352-04-2
- Leme, Elton M.C. (1997), Canistrum : bromélias da Mata Atlântica (in Portuguese), Rio de Janeiro: Salamander, ISBN 978-85-281-0202-4
- Leme, Elton M.C. (1998), Canistropsis : bromélias da Mata Atlântica (in Portuguese), Rio de Janeiro: Salamander, ISBN 978-85-86796-10-4
- Leme, Elton M.C. (2000), Nidularium : bromélias da Mata Atlântica (in Portuguese), Rio de Janeiro: Sextante, ISBN 978-85-86796-43-2
- Siqueira Filho, J.A. & Leme, Elton M.C. (2006), Fragmentos de Mata Atlântica do Nordeste, Biodiversidade, Conservação e suas Bromélias (in Portuguese), Rio de Janeiro: Jakobsson, ISBN 978-85-88742-19-2
