= Palynology =

Study of pollen and other acid-resistant microoscopic organic material

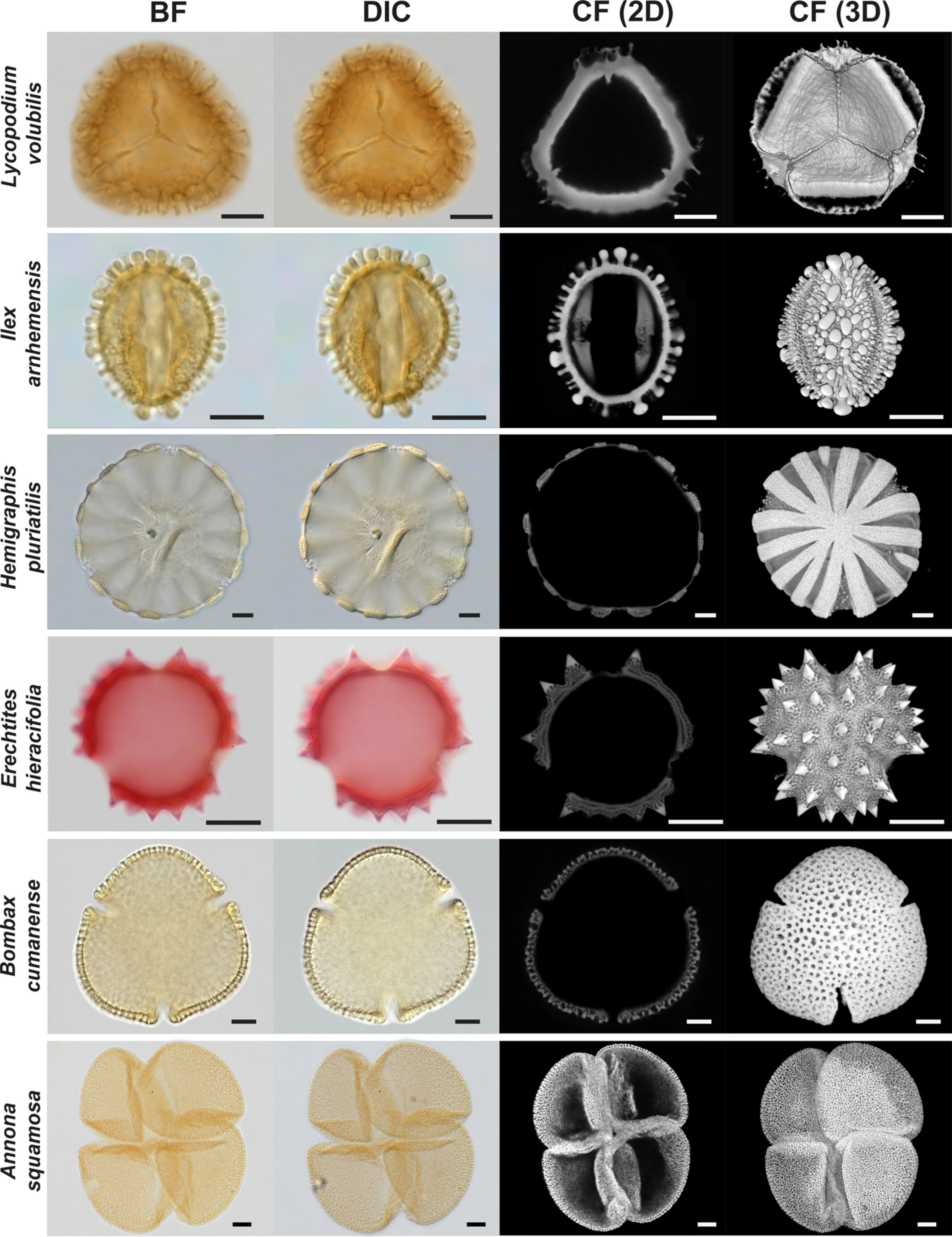
Pollen and spore grains seen under different research-grade microscopes, including confocal microscopy.

Palynology is the study of microorganisms and microscopic fragments of macroorganisms that are composed of acid-resistant organic material and occur in sediments, sedimentary rocks, and even some metasedimentary rocks. Palynomorphs are the microscopic, acid-resistant organic remains and debris produced by a wide variety of plants, animals, and Protista that have existed since the late Proterozoic.

It is the science that studies contemporary and fossil palynomorphs (paleopalynology), including pollen, spores, orbicules, dinocysts, acritarchs, chitinozoans and scolecodonts, together with particulate organic matter (POM) and kerogen found in sedimentary rocks and sediments. Palynology does not include diatoms, foraminiferans or other organisms with siliceous or calcareous tests. The words palynology and palynomorph derive from the Ancient Greek παλύνω (palúnō, 'I strew, sprinkle').

Palynology is an interdisciplinary science that stands at the intersection of earth science (geology or geological science) and biological science (biology), particularly plant science (botany). Biostratigraphy, a branch of paleontology and paleobotany, involves fossil palynomorphs from the Precambrian to the Holocene for their usefulness in the relative dating and correlation of sedimentary strata. Palynology is also used to date and understand the evolution of many kinds of plants and animals. In paleoclimatology, fossil palynomorphs are studied for their usefulness in understanding ancient Earth history in terms of reconstructing paleoenvironments and paleoclimates.

Palynology is quite useful in disciplines such as archeology, in honey production, and criminal and civil law. In archaeology, palynology is widely used to reconstruct ancient paleoenvironments and environmental shifts that significantly influenced past human societies and reconstruct the diet of prehistoric and historic humans. Melissopalynology, the study of pollen and other palynomorphs in honey, identifies the sources of pollen in terms of geographical location(s) and genera of plants. This not only provides important information on the ecology of honey bees, it also an important tool in discovering and policing the criminal adulteration and mislabeling of honey and its products. Forensic palynology uses palynomorphs as evidence in criminal and civil law to prove or disprove a physical link between objects, people, and places.

== Palynomorphs ==
Palynomorphs are broadly defined as organic remains, including microfossils, and microscopic fragments of macroorganisms that are composed of acid-resistant organic material and range in size between 5 and 500 micrometres. They are extracted from soils, sedimentary rocks and sediment cores, and other materials by a combination of physical (ultrasonic treatment and wet sieving) and chemical (acid digestion) procedures to remove the non-organic fraction. Palynomorphs may be composed of organic material such as chitin, pseudochitin and sporopollenin.

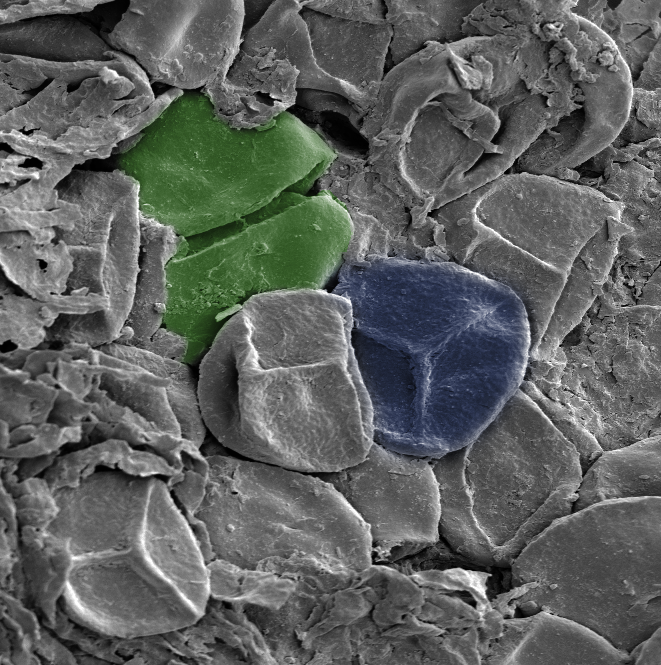
A late Silurian sporangium bearing trilete spores. Such spores provide the earliest evidence of life on land. Green: A spore tetrad. Blue: A spore bearing a trilete mark – the Y-shaped scar. The spores are about 30–35 μm across.

Palynomorphs form a geological record of importance in determining the type of prehistoric life that existed at the time the sedimentary strata was laid down. As a result, these microfossils give important clues to the prevailing climatic conditions of the time. Their paleontological utility derives from an abundance numbering in millions of palynomorphs per gram in organic marine deposits, even when such deposits are generally not fossiliferous. Palynomorphs, however, generally have been destroyed in metamorphic or recrystallized rocks.

Typical palynomorphs include dinoflagellate cysts, acritarchs, spores, pollen, plant tissue, fungi, scolecodonts (scleroprotein teeth, jaws, and associated features of polychaete annelid worms), arthropod organs (such as insect mouthparts), and chitinozoans. Palynomorph microscopic structures that are abundant in most sediments are resistant to routine pollen extraction.

== Palynofacies ==
A palynofacies is the complete assemblage of organic matter and palynomorphs in a fossil deposit. The term was introduced by the French geologist André Combaz in 1964. Palynofacies studies are often linked to investigations of the organic geochemistry of sedimentary rocks. The study of the palynofacies of a sedimentary depositional environment can be used to learn about the depositional palaeoenvironments of sedimentary rocks in exploration geology, often in conjunction with palynological analysis and vitrinite reflectance.

Palynofacies can be used in two ways:

- Organic palynofacies considers all the acid insoluble particulate organic matter (POM), including kerogen and palynomorphs in sediments and palynological preparations of sedimentary rocks. The sieved or unsieved preparations may be examined using strew mounts on microscope slides that may be examined using a transmitted light biological microscope or ultraviolet (UV) fluorescence microscope. The abundance, composition and preservation of the various components, together with the thermal alteration of the organic matter is considered.
- Palynomorph palynofacies considers the abundance, composition and diversity of palynomorphs in a sieved palynological preparation of sediments or palynological preparation of sedimentary rocks. The ratio of marine fossil phytoplankton (acritarchs and dinoflagellate cysts), together with chitinozoans, to terrestrial palynomorphs (pollen and spores) can be used to derive a terrestrial input index in marine sediments.

== History ==
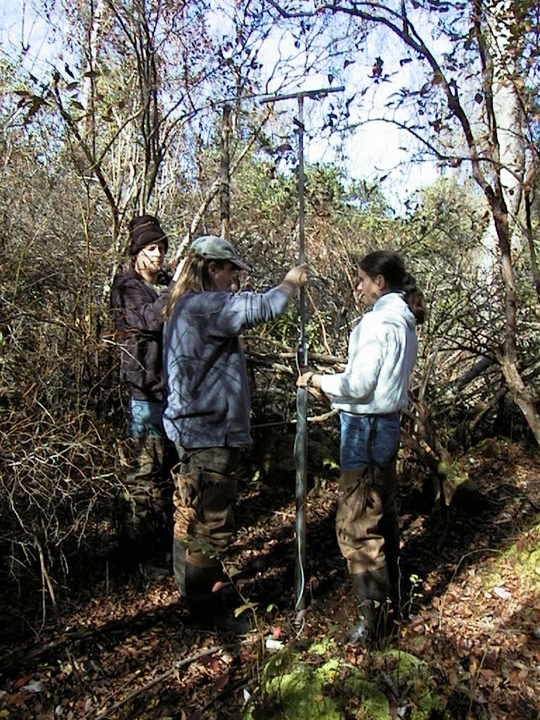
Pollen core sampling, Fort Bragg, North Carolina

=== Early history ===
The earliest reported observations of pollen under a microscope are likely to have been in the 1640s by the English botanist Nehemiah Grew, who described pollen and the stamen, and concluded that pollen is required for sexual reproduction in flowering plants.

By the late 1870s, as optical microscopes improved and the principles of stratigraphy were worked out, Robert Kidston and P. Reinsch were able to examine the presence of fossil spores in the Devonian and Carboniferous coal seams and make comparisons between the living spores and the ancient fossil spores. Early investigators include Christian Gottfried Ehrenberg (radiolarians, diatoms and dinoflagellate cysts), Gideon Mantell (desmids) and Henry Hopley White (dinoflagellate cysts).

=== 1890s to 1940s ===
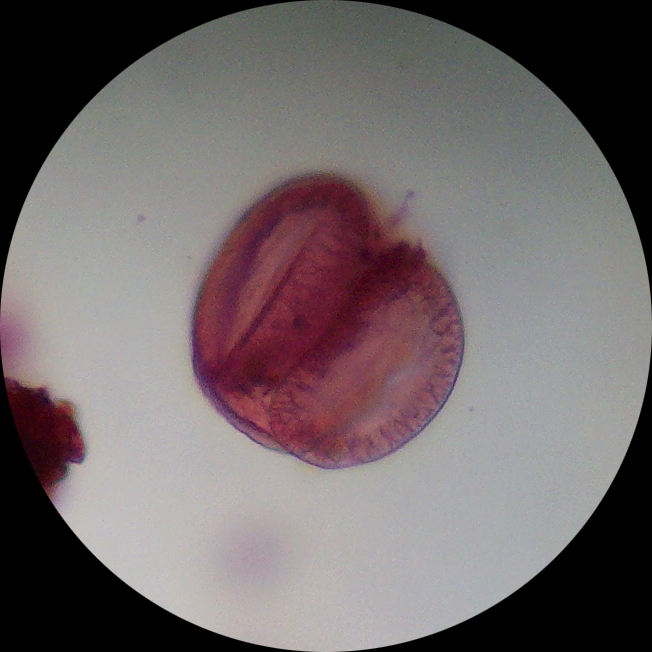
Pine pollen under a modern simple light microscope

Quantitative analysis of pollen began with Lennart von Post's published work. Although he published in the Swedish language, his methodology gained a wide audience through his lectures. In particular, his Kristiania lecture of 1916 was important in gaining a wider audience. Because the early investigations were published in the Nordic languages (Scandinavian languages), the field of pollen analysis was confined to those countries. The isolation ended with the German publication of Gunnar Erdtman's 1921 thesis. The methodology of pollen analysis became widespread throughout Europe and North America and revolutionized Quaternary vegetation and climate change research.

Earlier pollen researchers include Früh (1885), who enumerated many common tree pollen types, and a considerable number of spores and herb pollen grains. There is a study of pollen samples taken from sediments of Swedish lakes by Trybom (1888); pine and spruce pollen was found in such profusion that he considered them to be serviceable as "index fossils". Georg F. L. Sarauw studied fossil pollen of middle Pleistocene age (Cromerian) from the harbour of Copenhagen. Lagerheim (in Witte 1905) and C. A.Weber (in H. A. Weber 1918) appear to be among the first to undertake 'percentage frequency' calculations.

=== 1940s to 1989 ===
The term palynology was introduced by Hyde and Williams in 1944, following correspondence with the Swedish geologist Ernst Antevs, in the pages of the Pollen Analysis Circular (one of the first journals devoted to pollen analysis, produced by Paul Sears in North America). Hyde and Williams chose palynology on the basis of the Greek words paluno meaning 'to sprinkle' and pale meaning 'dust' (and thus similar to the Latin word pollen). The archive-based background to the adoption of the term palynology and to alternative names (e.g. paepalology, pollenology) has been exhaustively explored. It has been argued there that the word gained general acceptance once used by the influential Swedish palynologist Gunnar Erdtman.

Pollen analysis in North America stemmed from Phyllis Draper, an MS student under Sears at the University of Oklahoma. During her time as a student, she developed the first pollen diagram from a sample that depicted the percentage of several species at different depths at Curtis Bog. This was the introduction of pollen analysis in North America; pollen diagrams today still often remain in the same format with depth on the y-axis and abundances of species on the x-axis.

=== 1990s to the 21st century ===
Pollen analysis advanced rapidly in this period due to advances in optics and computers. Much of the science was revised by Johannes Iversen and Knut Fægri in their textbook on the subject.

== Methods of studying palynomorphs ==
=== Chemical preparation ===
Chemical digestion follows a number of steps. Initially the only chemical treatment used by researchers was treatment with potassium hydroxide (KOH) to remove humic substances; defloculation was accomplished through surface treatment or ultra-sonic treatment, although sonification may cause the pollen exine to rupture. In 1924, the use of hydrofluoric acid (HF) to digest silicate minerals was introduced by Assarson and Granlund, greatly reducing the amount of time required to scan slides for palynomorphs.

Palynological studies using peats presented a particular challenge because of the presence of well-preserved organic material, including fine rootlets, moss leaflets and organic litter. This was the last major challenge in the chemical preparation of materials for palynological study. Acetolysis was developed by Gunnar Erdtman and his brother to remove these fine cellulose materials by dissolving them. In acetolysis the specimen is treated with acetic anhydride and sulfuric acid, dissolving cellulistic materials and thus providing better visibility for palynomorphs.

Some steps of the chemical treatments require special care for safety reasons, in particular the use of HF which diffuses very fast through the skin and, causes severe chemical burns, and can be fatal.

Another treatment includes kerosene flotation for chitinous materials.

=== Analysis ===
Once samples have been prepared chemically, they are mounted on microscope slides using silicon oil, glycerol or glycerol-jelly and examined using light microscopy or mounted on a stub for scanning electron microscopy.

Researchers will often study either modern samples from a number of unique sites within a given area, or samples from a single site with a record through time, such as samples obtained from peat or lake sediments. More recent studies have used the modern analog technique in which paleo-samples are compared to modern samples for which the parent vegetation is known.

When the slides are observed under a microscope, the researcher counts the number of grains of each pollen taxon. This record is next used to produce a pollen diagram. These data can be used to detect anthropogenic effects, such as logging, traditional patterns of land use or long term changes in regional climate

== Applications ==
Palynology can be applied to problems in many scientific disciplines including geology, botany, paleontology, archaeology, pedology (soil study), and physical geography:

- Biostratigraphy and geochronology. Geologists use palynological studies in biostratigraphy to correlate strata and determine the relative age of a given bed, horizon, formation or stratigraphical sequence. Because the distribution of acritarchs, chitinozoans, dinoflagellate cysts, pollen and spores provides evidence of stratigraphical correlation through biostratigraphy and palaeoenvironmental reconstruction, one common and lucrative application of palynology is in hydrocarbon exploration.
- Paleoecology and climate change. Palynology can be used to reconstruct past vegetation (land plants) and marine and Freshwater phytoplankton communities, and so infer past environmental (palaeoenvironmental) and palaeoclimatic conditions in an area thousands or millions of years ago, a fundamental part of research into climate change.
- Organic palynofacies studies, which examine the preservation of the particulate organic matter and palynomorphs provides information on the depositional environment of sediments and depositional palaeoenvironments of sedimentary rocks.
- Geothermal alteration studies examine the colour of palynomorphs extracted from rocks to give the thermal alteration and maturation of sedimentary sequences, which provides estimates of maximum palaeotemperatures.
- Limnology studies. Freshwater palynomorphs and animal and plant fragments, including the prasinophytes and desmids (green algae) can be used to study past lake levels and long term climate change.
- Taxonomy and evolutionary studies. Involving the use of pollen morphological characters as source of taxonomic data to delimit plant species under same family or genus. Pollen apertural status is frequently used for differential sorting or finding similarities between species of the same taxa. This is also called Palynotaxonomy.
- Forensic palynology: the study of pollen and other palynomorphs for evidence at a crime scene.
- Allergy studies and pollen counting. Studies of the geographic distribution and seasonal production of pollen, can be used to forecast pollen conditions, helping sufferers of allergies such as hay fever.
- Melissopalynology: the study of pollen and spores found in honey.
- Archaeological palynology examines human uses of plants in the past. This can help determine seasonality of site occupation, presence or absence of agricultural practices or products, and 'plant-related activity areas' within an archaeological context. Bonfire Shelter is one such example of this application.

== See also ==
- Aperture (botany) – Areas on the walls of a pollen grain, where the wall is thinner and/or softer
- Aeroplankton – Tiny lifeforms floating and drifting in the air, carried by the wind
- Microbiology – Study of microscopic organisms (microbes)

== Sources ==
- Moore, P.D., et al. (1991), Pollen Analysis (Second Edition). Blackwell Scientific Publications. ISBN 0-632-02176-4
- Traverse, A. (1988), Paleopalynology. Unwin Hyman. ISBN 0-04-561001-0
- Roberts, N. (1998), The Holocene an environmental history, Blackwell Publishing. ISBN 0-631-18638-7
