= Pollen Analysis Circular =

The final cover of the Pollen Analysis Circular.

The Pollen Analysis Circular was a mimeographed publication that maintained communications among scientists working on either side of the Atlantic Ocean during World War II and aided the early development of the field of palynology. It was initiated by Paul Sears in 1943 and published somewhat regularly until May 1949 (No. 17), by which time scientific meetings had again become feasible. Publication was made possible by contributions and the efforts of many individuals at various institutions. It provided comments and discussion on the field, progress reports on research projects, lists and addresses of researchers in the field, bibliographies, obituaries, and other news items. A final issue, No. 18, was printed in January 1954.

== History ==
The international scientific cooperation on which the field of palynology depended was interrupted by the onset of World War II. The Pollen Analysis Circular was a response to increased handicaps to travel during the late stages of World War II. Because palynology was a well established trans-Atlantic field by the time World War II broke out, workers in the United States, Britain, and Germany in particular, had difficulty maintaining contact with one another. The Pollen Analysis Circular allowed researchers in the United States to maintain contact with one another and maintain publication lists that had, until then, been published by Gunnar Erdtman as "Literature on Pollen Statistics and Related Topics".

The first issue of the Pollen Analysis Circular was dated May 5, 1943 and published by Paul B. Sears (Oberlin College). Subsequent issues were generally edited by Sears, sometimes in cooperation with L.R. Wilson.

In January 1945, the Pollen Analysis Circular was renamed the Pollen and Spore Circular to more accurately reflect its scope. After 1954, the Circular was incorporated into the Micropaleontologist, soon renamed Micropaleontology, published by the American Museum of Natural History. The last issue of the Pollen and Spore Circular (#18) was edited by Calvin J. Heusser and announced the fusion, indicating that "the spore and pollen section will constitute four to six pages in each issue and contain essentially the same material" as in the Pollen and Spore Circular.

The final issue also included abstracts from the First Palynology Conference (February 25, 1953), held at Yale University as well as correspondence from researchers working as far afield as Düsseldorf, Lucknow, and Indianapolis.

== Highlights ==
It was in the pages of the Pollen Analysis Circular that the field of pollen analysis was given the modern name of palynology based on correspondence in issues 6, 7, and 8 between H.A. Hyde and D.A. Williams, who are credited with coming up with the name palynology, along with contributions by Ernst Antevs, Paul B. Sears, A. Orville Dahl, and L. R. Wilson.
