= Phyllis Draper =

US paleoecologist (1907–2000)

Phyllis Draper, born on August 22, 1907, was a paleoecologist most notable for developing the first pollen diagram in North America in 1928. She began her career as a graduate student under Paul Sears, the chair of the botany department at the University of Oklahoma. Sears gave his students the freedom to explore unique topics in order to design their own theses. Draper took advantage of this, and during her time working and studying under Sears, she published two major papers entitled, "A Demonstration of the Technique of Pollen Analysis" and "A Comparison of Pollen Spectra of Old and Young Bogs in the Erie Basin." She believed that the fossil pollen could be used to make inferences about the climates of specific regions. Her first pollen graph showed the pollen in New Haven Bog, which included pteridophyte spores, grasses, pines, oak, and larch, and unknown pollen. She later updated this pollen diagram and developed another one for the Curtis Bog. Draper graduated from the University of Oklahoma in 1929 with an M.S. in botany. She died on August 8, 2000.

== First North American pollen diagram ==
In 1928, Phyllis Draper was the first in North America to develop what would become one of the most common practices used in palynology - the pollen diagram. While attending the University of Oklahoma as a MS student, her first experience with this technique was during her study of New Haven Pond in New Haven, Ohio. Her study described the collection of the bog's subsurface peat that she called "borings." She used data from peat that had been separated and analyzed the pollen grains that had been boiled pollen in slightly basic conditions using potassium hydroxide. These were the data that she used to count the recurrence of different types of pollen. Her first ever pollen graph included pteridophyte spores, unknown spores, grasses, pines, oak, and larch. The patterns of the pollen graph represented the percentages of each listed species at various depths. The graph, however, did not have the axes labels that are standard today (depth on the y-axis and percent abundance on the x-axis). She admitted that her work could not lead to any conclusions due to the incompleteness of her results.

== Second publication ==
Phyllis Draper went on to expand the results from her first study and compare them to another bog, known as Curtis bog in Lucas County, Ohio. The goal of this study was to understand the origins of both locations based on the pollen collected in the peat samples. The methods of this study were more descriptive, but had many parallels with her previous paper, including the separation of the peat and the boiling of the pollen samples in potassium hydroxide. The samples were collected by Paul Sears. With more extensive data, Phyllis Draper was able to expand her previous pollen diagram of New Haven Bog. The methods section of the paper explained that depth went as deep as 10 feet subsurface. The y-axis depicts this depth with 1 at the top and 10 at the bottom, indicating that top to bottom was read as the "newest to oldest" sedimentation. This is the typical layout for pollen diagrams today. Across the x-axis was the percentage of each pollen type. Draper now had data for more species and was able to find a forest succession pattern present in the New Haven Bog via the observed disappearance and reappearance of trees with a dominance of conifer species. This was compared to Curtis Bog, which lacked the succession pattern. The overall goal of this paper was to compare the basal ages of the two bogs. This was not achieved because of unsuccessful dating techniques.

== Later life ==
After Draper graduated from the University of Oklahoma with an M.S. in botany, she was featured in an alumni news magazine and was recognized for becoming a teacher. She became a botany instructor at the University of Tennessee where she studied atmospheric pollen and advised students.
