= Hylaeaicum meeanum =

Scientific classification
- Kingdom: Plantae
- Clade: Tracheophytes
- Clade: Angiosperms
- Clade: Monocots
- Clade: Commelinids
- Order: Poales
- Family: Bromeliaceae
- Subfamily: Bromelioideae
- Genus: Hylaeaicum
- Species: H. meeanum

Binomial name
- Hylaeaicum meeanum (Reitz) Leme & Forzza

Synonyms
- Neoregelia meeana Reitz

Species of plant

Hylaeaicum meeanum is a species of flowering plant in the family Bromeliaceae, endemic to Brazil (the state of Amazonas). It was first described in 1975 as Neoregelia meeana. It was first collected by Margaret Mee, near the source of Rio Andirá, near Parintins. It may be treated as a synonym of Hylaeaicum levianum (as Neoregelia leviana), but as of November 2022 was accepted by Plants of the World Online and the Encyclopaedia of Bromeliads.
