= Hylaeaicum margaretae =

Scientific classification
- Kingdom: Plantae
- Clade: Tracheophytes
- Clade: Angiosperms
- Clade: Monocots
- Clade: Commelinids
- Order: Poales
- Family: Bromeliaceae
- Subfamily: Bromelioideae
- Genus: Hylaeaicum
- Species: H. margaretae

Binomial name
- Hylaeaicum margaretae (L.B.Sm.) Leme & Forzza

Synonyms
- Neoregelia margaretae L.B.Sm.

Species of flowering plant

Hylaeaicum margaretae is a species of flowering plant in the family Bromeliaceae, endemic to Brazil (the state of Amazonas). It was first described in 1968 as Neoregelia margaretae. The specific epithet pays homage to Margaret Mee, a British botanical artist who carried out fifteen expeditions to the Amazon rainforest to collect and paint rare or endangered plant species, including many species of Bromeliaceae.

== Description ==
=== Pollen ===
The pollen of the species is large, ranging in size from 51 μm to 100 μm. The pollen is of the monad type and it has multiple poles. When viewed from a pole, the pollen is an ellipsoid shape. When dry, the pollen is an irregular shape and has irregular infoldings. The apertures on the pollen's surface are porus and psilate, lacking ornamentation. The grains lack orbicules.

== Taxonomy ==
Hylaeaicum margaretae was first described by Lyman Bradford Smith in 1968 as Neoregelia margaretae. It was transferred to the genus Hylaeaicum in 2021.

== Habitat and distribution ==
Hylaeaicum margaretae can be found in Brazil across the Amazon region. The holotype was collected by Margaret Mee in the state of Amazonas by the Içana River in February 1968.

== Painting ==
Margaret Mee was known for her paintings of bromeliads in the Amazon, and Hylaeaicum margaretae was one of the species she recorded in watercolor. Mee was the first to record the existence of the species, unknown to science and still unnamed at the time. The painting of H. margaretae, made in 1979, was notable for its ability to capture botanical details of the species while still showing the plant in its totality, rather than on different plates which depict individual parts.
