= Estella Leopold =

American botanist (1927–2024)

- Born: Estella Bergere Leopold; January 8, 1927; Madison, Wisconsin, U.S.
- Died: February 25, 2024 (aged 97); Seattle, Washington, U.S.
- Education: University of Wisconsin–Madison; University of California, Berkeley; Yale University
- Occupations: Paleobotanist; University teacher Environmentalist
- Parents: Aldo Leopold (father); Estella Bergere (mother)
- Relatives: A. Starker Leopold, Luna Leopold, Nina Leopold Bradley, A. Carl Leopold
- Awards: Paleontological Society Medal (2013); International Cosmos Prize (2010); Wilbur Cross Medal (1993)
- Scientific career
- Fields: Environmental protection, paleobotany, paleoecology, environmental protection
- Workplaces: United States Geological Survey (1955–1976); University of Washington (1976–2000)
- Doctoral advisor: Paul Sears

Estella Bergere Leopold (January 8, 1927 – February 25, 2024) was an American paleobotanist and a conservationist. As a researcher in the United States Geological Survey, she aided in uncovering records of plant life from the Miocene around the Eniwetok and Bikini Atolls in the southern Pacific Ocean and from the Cenozoic era in the Rocky Mountains. As a professor of botany and forest sciences at the University of Washington, she directed the Quaternary Research Center, researched the forest history of the Pacific Northwest, and collaborated with Chinese paleobotanists. Leopold's work as a conservationist included taking legal action to help save the Florissant Fossil Beds in Colorado, and fighting pollution. She was the daughter of Aldo Leopold.

== Education ==
Leopold was born in Madison, Wisconsin. She graduated with a degree in botany from the University of Wisconsin in 1948, attained her master's in botany from the University of California, Berkeley in 1950, and completed a Ph.D. in botany from Yale University in 1955, where she studied with Paul B. Sears and Edward Smith Deevey, Jr., two palynological pioneers in the United States, and also with G. Evelyn Hutchinson, an internationally known limnologist and ecologist. At Yale, Leopold began to specialize in studying pollen on a dare from an adviser. Her research involved extracting pollen and spores from ancient rocks and sediments and comparing this evidence of fossil plants with those of modern specimens in order to infer what past landscapes and environments were like.

== Work with United States Geological Survey, 1955–1976 ==
On completing her Ph.D. in 1955, Dr. Leopold took a job with the United States Geological Survey, where she worked for 21 years, from 1955 to 1976. She made important findings about the effects of climate on the evolution and extinction of prehistoric plant species. In her work in the Rocky Mountains, she discovered that extinction and evolution of ancient species into newer variants was more prevalent in the middle of the continent because of the wider degree of seasonal changes; in contrast, coastal areas with more moderate climates supported older species such as the giant redwood. Her work also included studying drilled cores containing pollen from the Miocene Epoch that revealed evidence of a tropical rainforest in the Eniwetok and Bikini Atoll area of the Pacific Ocean (now the Marshall Islands). By studying plant fossil records from the Rocky Mountains in Colorado, Idaho, and Wyoming, Leopold provided inferences about the paleoenvironment of the Paleogene and Neogene periods. The 34-million-year-old plant fossils preserved in the Florissant Valley, southwest of Denver and now part of the Florissant Fossil Beds National Monument, yielded some of the key evidence for her studies.

== Conservation ==
Leopold's research in Colorado at the Florissant Fossil beds led her to become a leader in the effort to preserve the area containing this rich fossil evidence. The area was to be converted into a real estate development until she and several others filed suit. On August 20, 1969, the 6,000-acre area became the Florissant Fossil Beds National Monument.

Other conservation actions taken by Leopold include opposing oil shale development in western Colorado, stopping dams from being built in the Grand Canyon, and helping stop shipping of high-level nuclear materials through the Strait of Juan de Fuca and Puget Sound. She served on the board and has been president of the Aldo Leopold Foundation in Baraboo, Wisconsin.

== Honoraria ==
In 1969, Leopold was awarded Conservationist-of-the-Year-Award by the Colorado Wildlife Federation. She was elected to the prestigious National Academy of Sciences in 1974, and two years later she was awarded the Keep Colorado Beautiful annual award. She served as president of the Pacific Division of the American Association for the Advancement of Science in 1995 and as president of the American Quaternary Association from 1982–1984; is a Fellow of the American Association for the Advancement of Science, the Geological Society of America, the American Academy of Arts and Sciences, and the American Philosophical Society; was the associate editor of Quaternary Research from 1976–1983 and on the journal's editorial board, as well as that of Quaternary International. In 2010 she won the International Cosmos Prize for contributions to conservation.

== Death ==
Leopold died on February 25, 2024, at a Seattle retirement home. She was 97.
