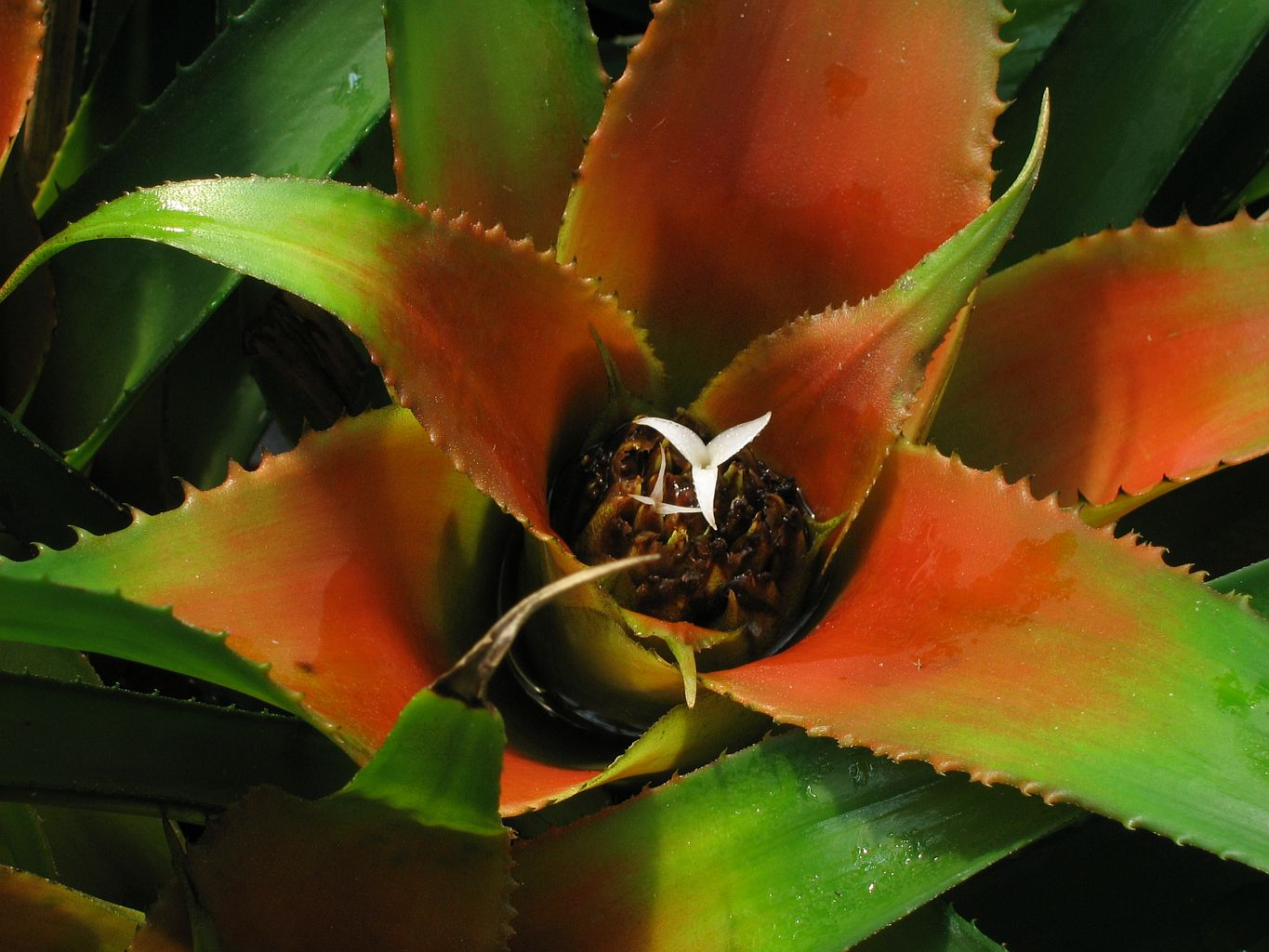

Scientific classification
- Kingdom: Plantae
- Clade: Tracheophytes
- Clade: Angiosperms
- Clade: Monocots
- Clade: Commelinids
- Order: Poales
- Family: Bromeliaceae
- Subfamily: Bromelioideae
- Genus: Hylaeaicum
- Species: H. wurdackii

Binomial name
- Hylaeaicum wurdackii (L.B.Sm.) Leme, Zizka & Aguirre-Santoro

Synonyms
- Neoregelia wurdackii L.B.Sm.

= Hylaeaicum wurdackii =

Species of plant

Hylaeaicum wurdackii is a species of flowering plant in the family Bromeliaceae, endemic to northern Peru. It was first described by Lyman Bradford Smith in 1963 as Neoregelia wurdackii.
