= Hylaeaicum myrmecophilum =

Scientific classification
- Kingdom: Plantae
- Clade: Tracheophytes
- Clade: Angiosperms
- Clade: Monocots
- Clade: Commelinids
- Order: Poales
- Family: Bromeliaceae
- Subfamily: Bromelioideae
- Genus: Hylaeaicum
- Species: H. myrmecophilum

Binomial name
- Hylaeaicum myrmecophilum (Ule) Leme & Forzza

Synonyms
- Aregelia myrmecophila (Ule) Mez; Neoregelia myrmecophila (Ule) L.B.Sm.; Nidularium myrmecophilum Ule

Species of flowering plant

Hylaeaicum myrmecophilum is a species of flowering plant in the family Bromeliaceae, native to northern Brazil, Colombia, Ecuador and Venezuela. It was first described by Ernst Heinrich Georg Ule in 1905.
