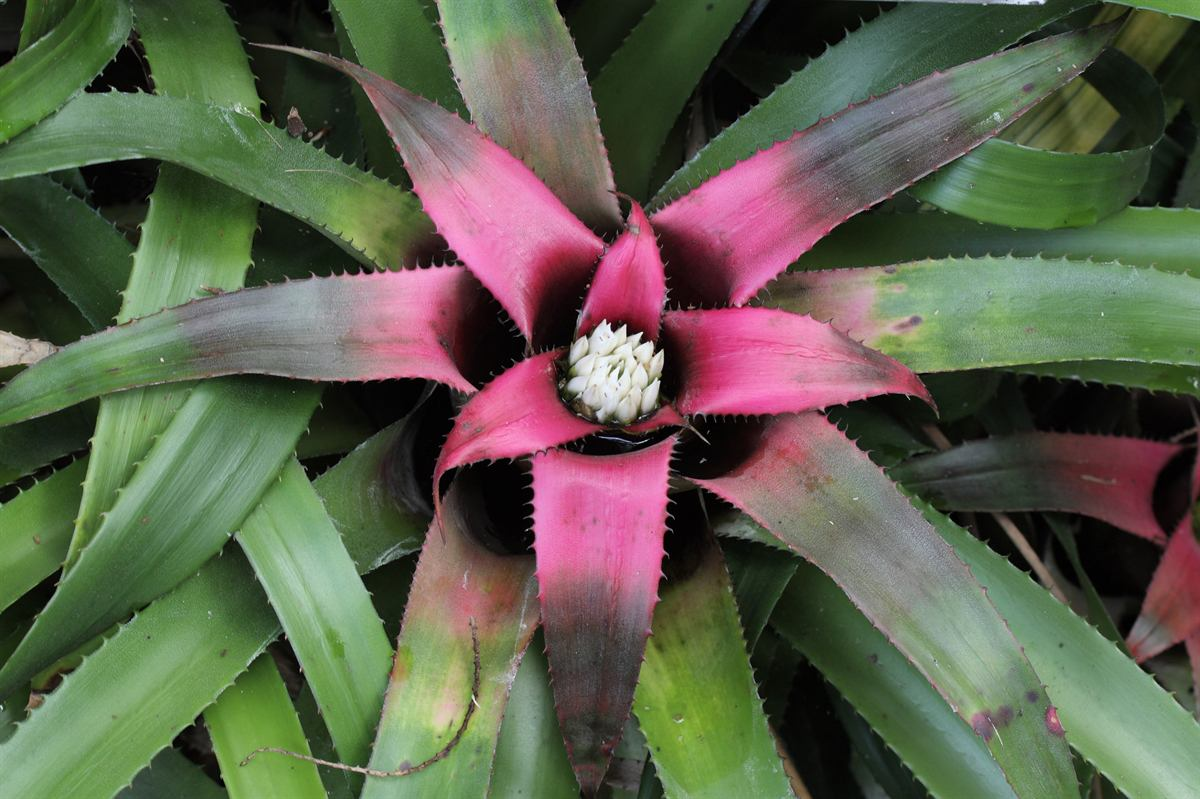
- Hylaeaicum pendulum

Scientific classification
- Kingdom: Plantae
- Clade: Embryophytes
- Clade: Tracheophytes
- Clade: Spermatophytes
- Clade: Angiosperms
- Clade: Monocots
- Clade: Commelinids
- Order: Poales
- Family: Bromeliaceae
- Subfamily: Bromelioideae
- Genus: Hylaeaicum (Ule ex Mez) Leme, Forzza, Zizka & Aguirre-Santoro

Species
- See text.

Synonyms
- Neoregelia subg. Hylaeaicum

= Hylaeaicum =

Genus of flowering plants

Hylaeaicum is a genus of flowering plant in the family Bromeliaceae, native to tropical northern South America. The taxon was first described by Ernst Heinrich Georg Ule in 1935 as a subgenus of "Aregelia" (an illegitimate genus name). It was later treated as a subgenus of Neoregelia, before being raised to a full genus in 2021, a status accepted by both Plants of the World Online and the Encyclopaedia of Bromeliads.

== Species ==
As of November 2022, Plants of the World Online accepted the following species:

- Hylaeaicum eleutheropetalum (Ule) Leme & Forzza, syn. Neoregelia eleutheropetala
- Hylaeaicum levianum (L.B.Sm.) Leme & Forzza, syn. Neoregelia leviana
- Hylaeaicum margaretae (L.B.Sm.) Leme & Forzza, syn. Neoregelia margaretae
- Hylaeaicum meeanum (Reitz) Leme & Forzza, syn. Neoregelia meeana
- Hylaeaicum mooreanum (L.B.Sm.) Leme, Zizka & Aguirre-Santoro, syn. Neoregelia mooreana
- Hylaeaicum myrmecophilum (Ule) Leme & Forzza, syn. Neoregelia myrmecophila
- Hylaeaicum pendulum (L.B.Sm.) Leme, Zizka & Aguirre-Santoro, syn. Neoregelia pendula
- Hylaeaicum peruvianum (L.B.Sm.) Leme, Zizka & Aguirre-Santoro, syn. Neoregelia peruviana
- Hylaeaicum roseum (L.B.Sm.) Leme, Zizka & Aguirre-Santoro, syn. Neoregelia rosea
- Hylaeaicum stoloniferum (L.B.Sm.) Leme, Zizka & Aguirre-Santoro, syn. Neoregelia stolonifera
- Hylaeaicum tarapotoense (Rauh) Leme, Zizka & Aguirre-Santoro, syn. Neoregelia tarapotoensis
- Hylaeaicum wurdackii (L.B.Sm.) Leme, Zizka & Aguirre-Santoro, syn. Neoregelia wurdackii
