= Anemophily =

Wind pollination

Wind-pollination (anemophily) syndrome

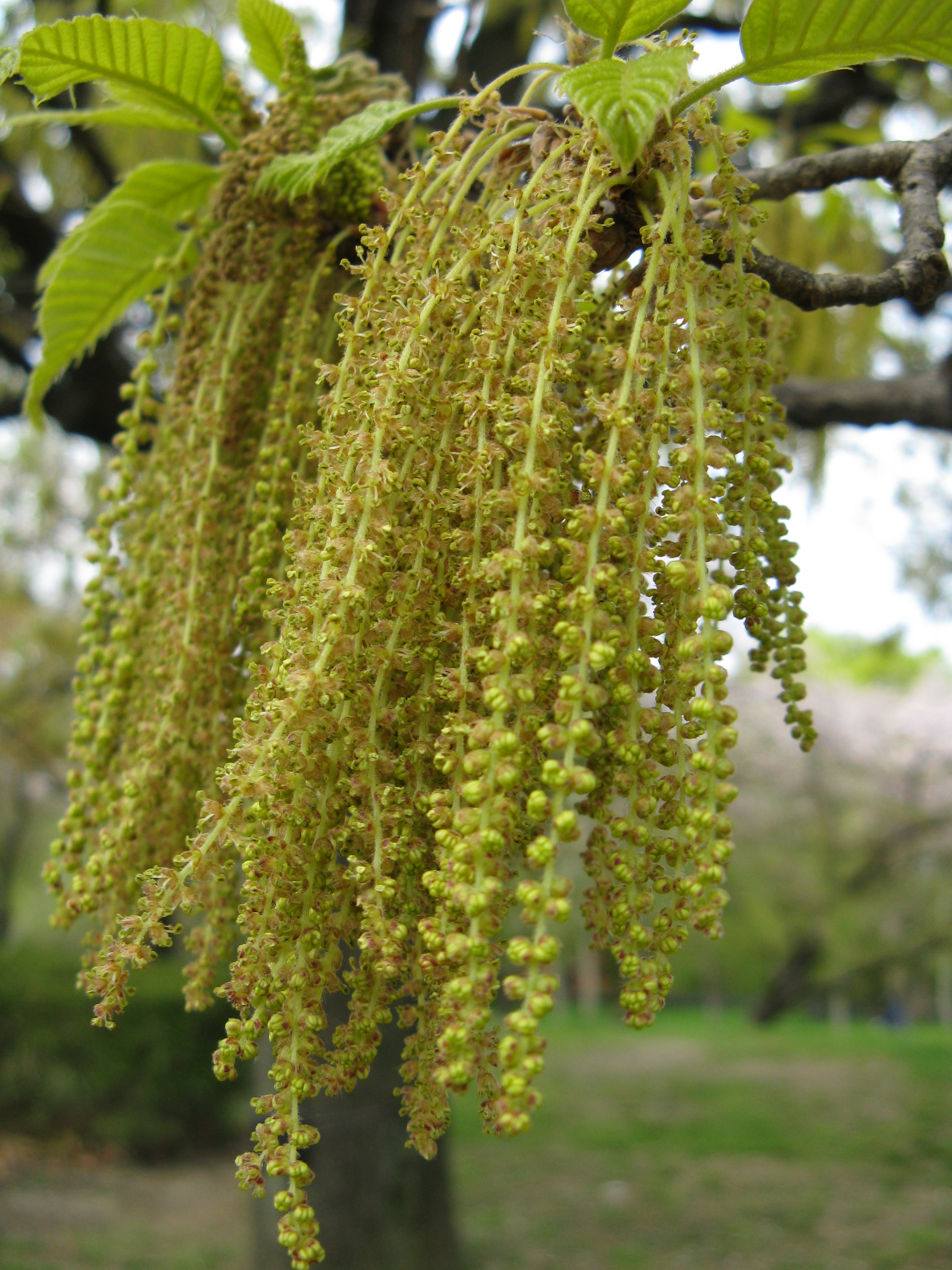
The flowers of wind-pollinated flowering plants, such as this saw-tooth oak (Quercus acutissima), are less showy than insect-pollinated flowers.

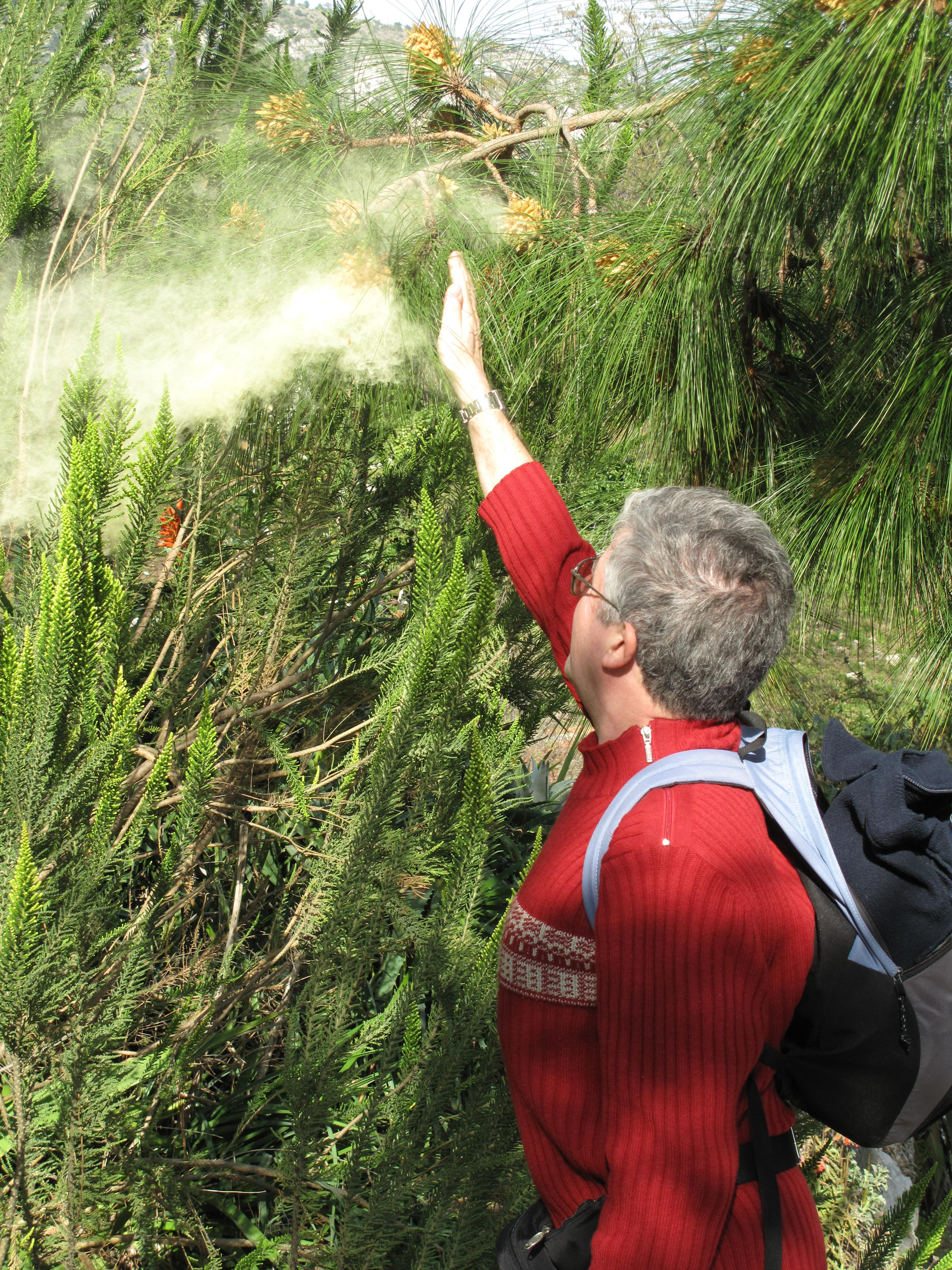
Anemophilous plants, such as this pine (Pinus) produce large quantities of pollen, which is carried on the wind.

Anemophily or wind pollination is a form of pollination whereby pollen is distributed by wind. Almost all gymnosperms are anemophilous, as are many plants in the order Poales, including grasses, sedges, and rushes. Other common anemophilous plants are oaks, pecans, pistachios, sweet chestnuts, alders, hops, and members of the family Juglandaceae (hickory or walnut family). Approximately 12% of plants across the globe are pollinated by anemophily, including cereal crops like rice and corn and other prominent crop plants like wheat, rye, barley, and oats. In addition, many pines, spruces, and firs are wind-pollinated.

== Syndrome ==
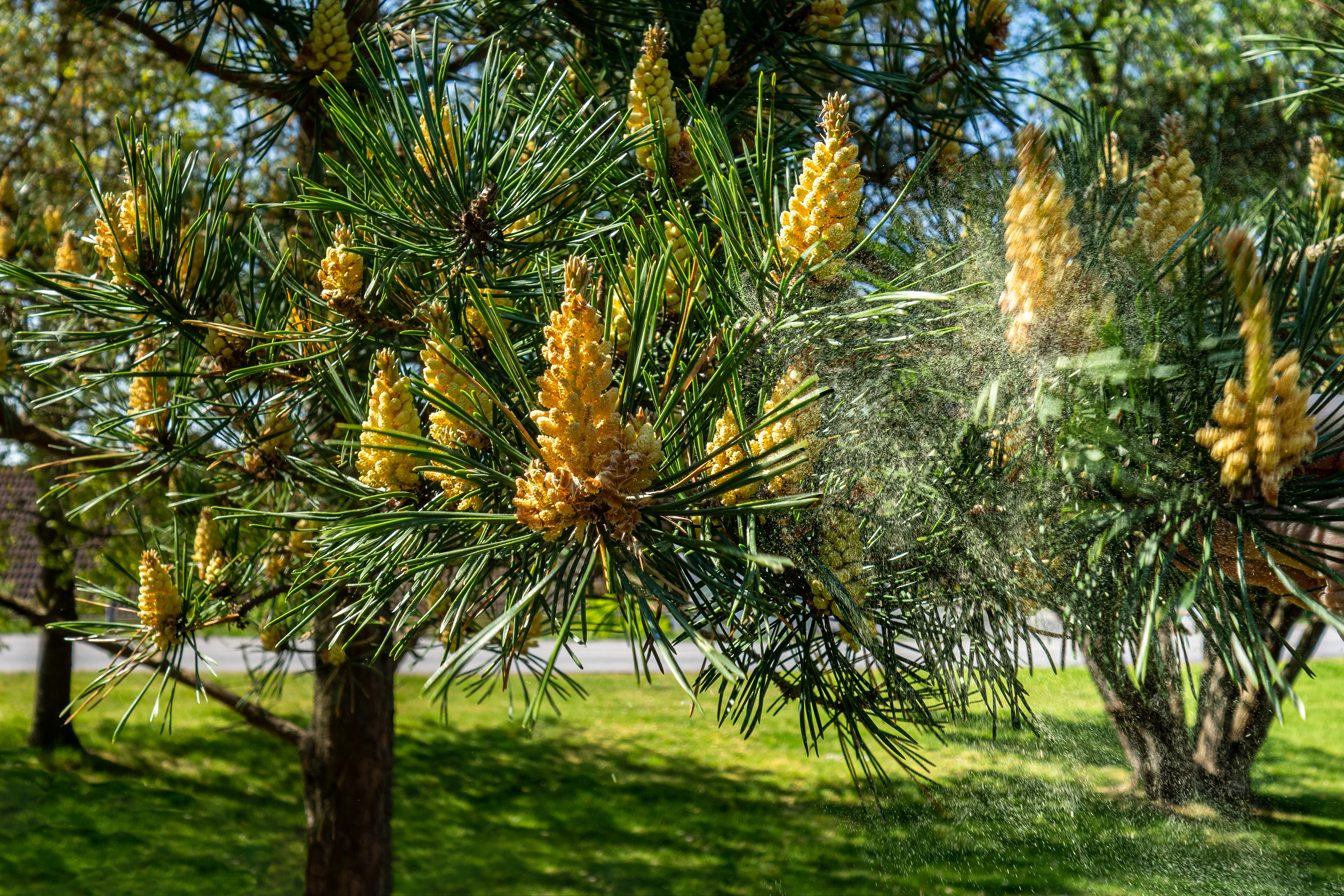
A pine with male flowers releasing pollen into the wind

Features of the wind-pollination syndrome include a lack of scent production, a lack of showy floral parts (resulting in small, inconspicuous flowers), reduced production of nectar, and the production of enormous numbers of pollen grains. This distinguishes them from entomophilous and zoophilous species (whose pollen is spread by insects and vertebrates respectively).

Anemophilous pollen grains are smooth, light, and non-sticky, so that they can be transported by air currents. Wind-pollinating plants have no predisposition to attract pollinating organisms. They freely expel a myriad of these pollen grains, and only a small percentage of them ends up captured by the female floral structures on wind-pollinated plants. They are typically 20–60 micrometres (0.0008–0.0024 in) in diameter, although the pollen grains of Pinus species can be much larger and much less dense. Anemophilous plants possess lengthy, well-exposed stamens to catch and distribute pollen. These stamens are exposed to wind currents and also have large, feathery stigma to easily trap airborne pollen grains. Pollen from anemophilous plants tends to be smaller and lighter than pollen from entomophilous ones, with very low nutritional value to insects due to their low protein content. However, insects sometimes gather pollen from staminate anemophilous flowers at times when higher-protein pollens from entomophilous flowers are scarce. Anemophilous pollens may also be inadvertently captured by bees' electrostatic field. This may explain why, though bees are not observed to visit ragweed flowers, its pollen is often found in honey made during the ragweed floral bloom. Other flowers that are generally anemophilous are observed to be actively worked by bees, with solitary bees often visiting grass flowers, and the larger honeybees and bumblebees frequently gathering pollen from corn tassels and other grains.

Anemophily is an adaptation that helps to separate the male and female reproductive systems of a single plant, reducing the effects of inbreeding. It often accompanies dioecy – the presence of male and female reproductive structures on separate plants. Anemophily is adaptively beneficial because it promotes outcrossing and thus the avoidance of inbreeding depression that can occur due to the expression of recessive deleterious mutations in inbred progeny plants.

== Allergies ==
Almost all pollens that are allergens are from anemophilous species. People allergic to the pollen produced by anemophilous plants often have symptoms of hay fever. Grasses (Poaceae) are the most important producers of aeroallergens in most temperate regions, with lowland or meadow species producing more pollen than upland or moorland species. In Morocco, it was found that asthma caused by pollen from Poaceae accounted for 10% of the clinical respiratory diseases that patients faced. The nature of how species of Poaceae grasses flower results in an increase in the time that the allergenic pollen circulates through the air, which is not favorable to people who are hypersensitive to it.
