= Hylaeaicum tarapotoense =

Scientific classification
- Kingdom: Plantae
- Clade: Tracheophytes
- Clade: Angiosperms
- Clade: Monocots
- Clade: Commelinids
- Order: Poales
- Family: Bromeliaceae
- Subfamily: Bromelioideae
- Genus: Hylaeaicum
- Species: H. tarapotoense

Binomial name
- Hylaeaicum tarapotoense (Rauh) Leme, Zizka & Aguirre-Santoro

Synonyms
- Neoregelia tarapotoensis Rauh

Species of plant

Hylaeaicum tarapotoense is a species of flowering plant in the family Bromeliaceae, endemic to northern Peru. It was first described in 1985 as Neoregelia tarapotoensis. It was first collected near Tarapoto in the Department of San Martín in northern Peru.
