= Conchiolin =

Proteins secreted by molluscs

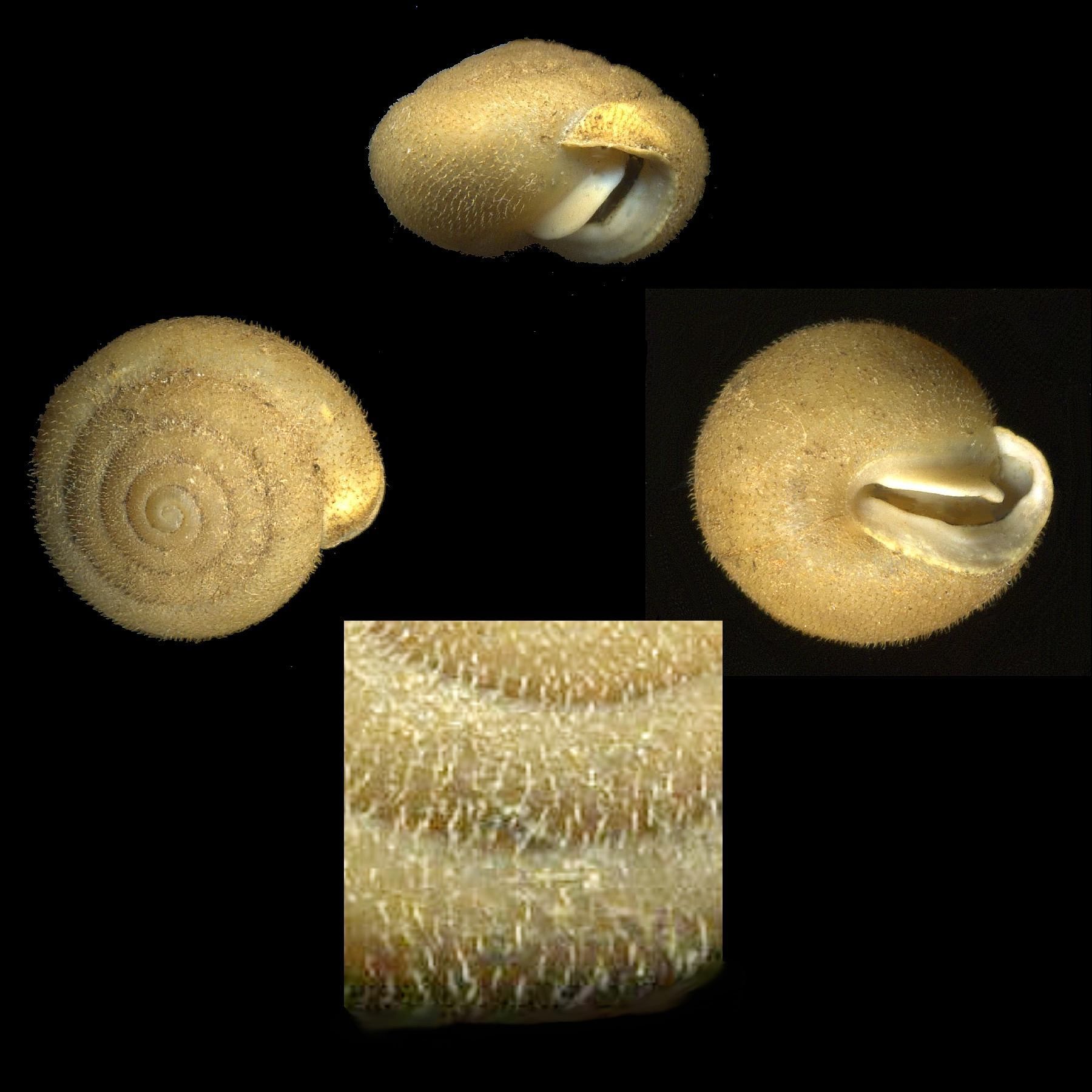
The shell of Stenotrema florida, a land snail. The periostracum is an organic layer of protein which, in this species, is developed into minute hairs, giving the snail a velvety look and feel

Conchiolins (sometimes referred to as conchins) are complex proteins which are secreted by a mollusc's outer epithelium (the mantle).

These proteins are part of a matrix of organic macromolecules, mainly proteins and polysaccharides, that assembled together form the microenvironment where crystals nucleate and grow. This organic matrix also holds and binds to the crystals of aragonite which give such shells their stiffness.

The ions necessary to form calcium carbonate are also secreted by the mantle, but it is the tailored environment created by the organic matrix which causes aragonite (rather than calcite) crystals to nucleate, in much the same way that collagen nucleates hydroxyapatite crystals.

Conchiolin serves as a relatively flexible, crack-deflecting matrix for the mineral aggregate particles; its strength and the strong bonding of perlucin can in some cases (such as in the formation of nacre) give the finished material an impressive level of toughness.

As well as providing a matrix into which the hard calcium carbonate part of the shell is precipitated, many species of mollusks (such as the land snail shown above) also have an outer shell layer called the periostracum which is composed of the protein conchiolin. Some land snails (especially the taxa that have become adapted to living on acidic soils) have very thin, transparent, tan-colored shells, even as adults, and those shells are composed entirely of conchiolin.

== See also ==
- Chitin
- Corneous
- Mollusc shell
- Periostracum
- Sporopollenin
- Tectin
