= Hylaeaicum peruvianum =

Scientific classification
- Kingdom: Plantae
- Clade: Tracheophytes
- Clade: Angiosperms
- Clade: Monocots
- Clade: Commelinids
- Order: Poales
- Family: Bromeliaceae
- Subfamily: Bromelioideae
- Genus: Hylaeaicum
- Species: H. peruvianum

Binomial name
- Hylaeaicum peruvianum (L.B.Sm.) Leme, Zizka & Aguirre-Santoro

Synonyms
- Neoregelia peruviana L.B.Sm.

Species of plant

Hylaeaicum peruvianum is a species of flowering plant in the family Bromeliaceae, endemic to Peru. It was first described by Lyman Bradford Smith in 1963 as Neoregelia peruviana.
