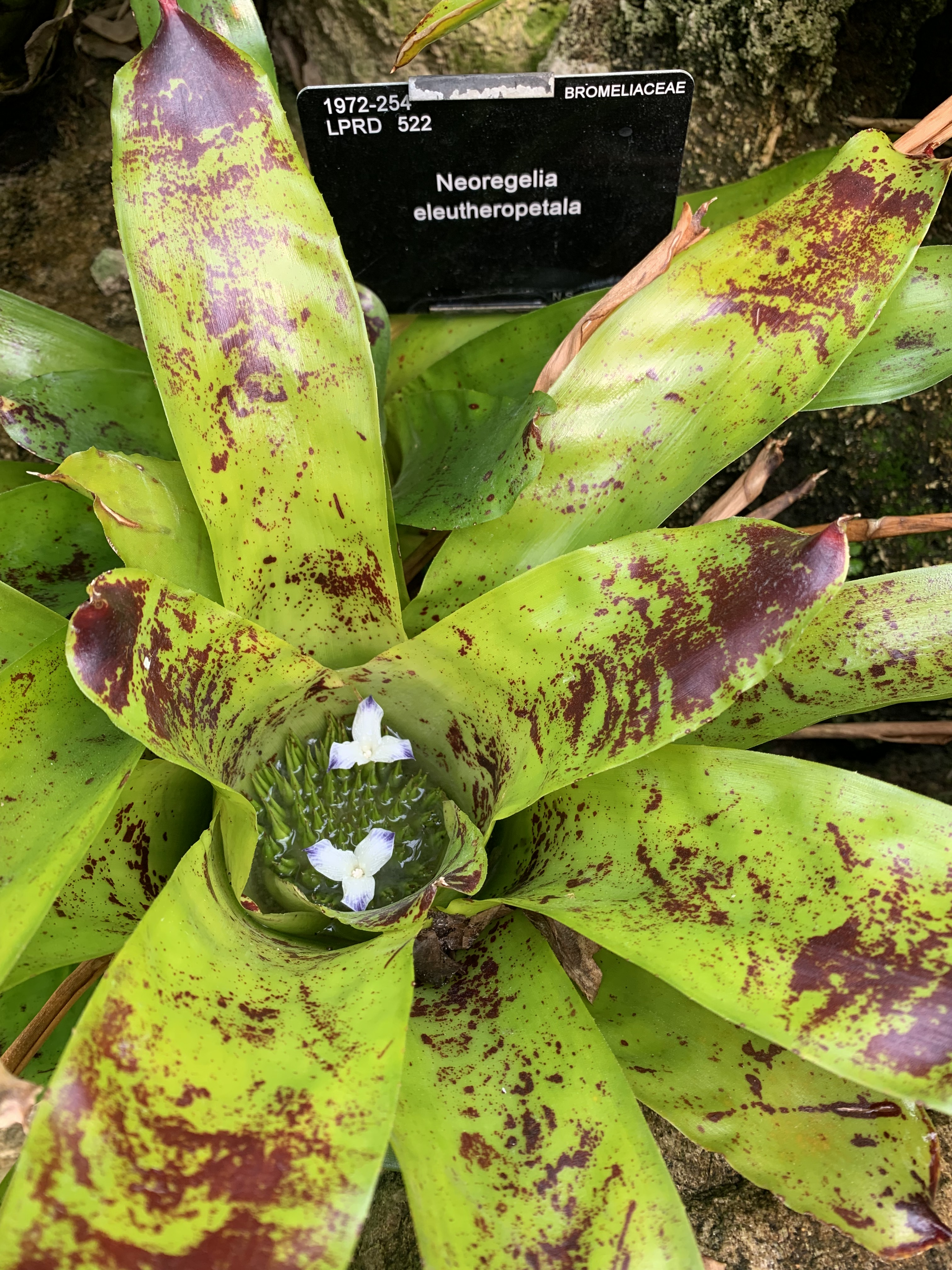

Scientific classification
- Kingdom: Plantae
- Clade: Tracheophytes
- Clade: Angiosperms
- Clade: Monocots
- Clade: Commelinids
- Order: Poales
- Family: Bromeliaceae
- Subfamily: Bromelioideae
- Genus: Hylaeaicum
- Species: H. eleutheropetalum

Binomial name
- Hylaeaicum eleutheropetalum (Ule) Leme & Forzza

Synonyms
- Aregelia eleutheropetala (Ule) Mez ex L.B.Sm.; Neoregelia eleutheropetala (Ule) L.B.Sm.; Nidularium eleutheropetalum Ule

= Hylaeaicum eleutheropetalum =

Species of flowering plant

Hylaeaicum eleutheropetalum, synonym Neoregelia eleutheropetala, is a species of flowering plant in the family Bromeliaceae, native to tropical South America (Venezuela, Colombia, Ecuador, Peru, northwestern Brazil). It was first described in 1907 by Ernst Heinrich Georg Ule as Nidularium eleutheropetalum.
