= Pollen core =

Core sample used for pollen analysis

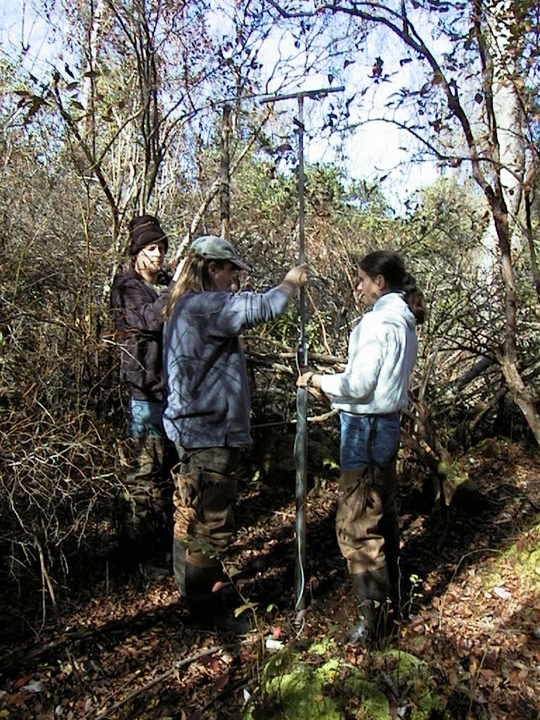
Pollen cores being taken at Fort Bragg, North Carolina.

A pollen core is a core sample of a medium containing a stratigraphic sequence of pollen. Analysis of the type and frequency of the pollen in each layer is used to study changes in climate or land use using regional vegetation as a proxy. This analysis is conceptually comparable to the study of ice cores.

== Methods ==
Cores are obtained from deposits where pollen is likely to have been trapped. Cores are generally obtained from lacustrine sediments and peat bogs although soil sediments may also be obtained. Degradation of the pollen exine and bioturbation may reduce the quality of the pollen grains and stratigraphy of the core so researchers frequently select locations where the sediments are under anaerobic conditions.

The cores are then subjected to pollen analysis by palynologists who are able to infer the proportions of major plant types from the concentrations of different pollen types found in the cores.

=== Coring equipment ===
There are a number of tools used for coring, often with specialized uses:

==== Core samplers ====
- Glew corer: A gravity corer used for lake surface sediments to capture the water-sediment interface. Similar to the Kajak-Brinkhurst sampler.
- Brown corer:
- Frozen finger: A tube is placed into the sediment and then filled with liquid nitrogen causing the sediment around the tube to freeze solid, preserving fine scale structure.
- Livingstone piston corer: A long metal tube with a piston at the lower end. Once the core tube is at the desired depth the piston is released and the barrel can be pushed downwards into the sediment. Generally used for lake sediments.
- Russian: A chamber corer used to sample peats.

==== Grab samplers ====
- Ekman grab sampler:
- Petersen grab:
- Ponar grab:
