= Hylaeaicum levianum =

Scientific classification
- Kingdom: Plantae
- Clade: Tracheophytes
- Clade: Angiosperms
- Clade: Monocots
- Clade: Commelinids
- Order: Poales
- Family: Bromeliaceae
- Subfamily: Bromelioideae
- Genus: Hylaeaicum
- Species: H. levianum

Binomial name
- Hylaeaicum levianum (L.B.Sm.) Leme & Forzza

Synonyms
- Neoregelia leviana L.B.Sm.

Species of flowering plant

Hylaeaicum levianum is a species of flowering plant in the family Bromeliaceae, native to northern Brazil, Colombia and Venezuela. It was first described by Lyman Bradford Smith in 1968 as Neoregelia leviana.
