= Paul Sears =

American ecologist & writer (1891–1990)

Paul Bigelow Sears (December 17, 1891 – April 30, 1990) was an American ecologist and writer.

== Life and career ==
He was born in Bucyrus, Ohio. Sears attended Ohio Wesleyan University (B.Sc. in Zoology, 1913; B.A. in Economics, 1914), the University of Nebraska–Lincoln (A.M. in Botany, 1915), and the University of Chicago (Ph.D. in Botany, 1922).

Sears married Marjorie Lea McCutcheon and the couple had three children: Paul M. Sears, Center for Atmospheric Research, Colorado; Dr. Catherine S. Frazer, Lakewood, Colorado, former Wellesley College faculty; Sallie H. Sears, Assistant Professor of English, Stony Brook.

Early in his research career, he published an innovative series on the Natural Vegetation of Ohio (1925 to 1926) These papers delineated the original forest types by using “witness trees” from the original land surveys of Ohio and are still widely cited by plant ecologists working in Ohio today.

During the Dust Bowl and his tenure at the University of Oklahoma, Sears wrote Deserts on the March, one of the first books to communicate ecological principles to the general public. His best known book, Deserts has gone through eleven printings of its four editions, most published by the University of Oklahoma Press. The first edition was last republished by Island Press in 1988 as part of its Conservation Classics series.

Also during the late 1920s and 1930s, Sears pioneered the study of fossil pollen as a cue to past vegetation and climate in the United States. One of his early students, Phyllis Draper, published the first American contribution to this developing field. Sears was the first to publish reference drawings of Lake Erie basin fossil pollen types, and published extensively in this field and inspired many students between 1930 and about 1950, by which time his interest in conservation and land use dominated his time.

In 1943, Sears independently initiated a publication, the Pollen Analysis Circular (later the Pollen and Spore Circular), to answer the “need of a freer interchange of information among those who are interested in pollen analysis in this country” during the period of restricted travel and professional meetings before and during the Second World War. Eighteen issues were mimeographed and distributed, ultimately, to more than 200 pollen researchers and interested scientists in North America and Europe. In issue 8, Sears reported on a suggestion by H.A. Hyde and D.A. Williams that this new science be named “palynology,” a term for this new field which was ultimately adopted by his colleagues. After the end of the war, the circulars were discontinued. The final issue appeared in 1954. By 1967, researchers had formalized a new professional organization, the American Association of Stratigraphic Palynologists.

In 1950, Sears was named chair of a new graduate program in Conservation at Yale University. The program was instigated and initially funded by the Conservation Foundation, of which Fairfield Osborn was head. An unprecedented interdisciplinary effort, this program produced several notable students, among them Paul Shepard and Estella Leopold, daughter of Aldo Leopold. Pioneer conservationist Leopold was a contemporary of Sears' who defined the land ethic and inspired new generations of conservationists and environmentalists.

Sears also served on the board of trustees of Science Service, now known as Society for Science, from 1954–1957.

In the mid 1960s, Sears retired to Taos, New Mexico, where he participated on local boards and committees, “taught dozens of local youngsters to play violin,” and “continued his work to make this planet a better place.” He taught a course in environmental biology in 1977 at Fort Burgwin, New Mexico, a research facility 10 miles from Taos which is owned by Southern Methodist University. He died in the medical center at Plaza de Retiro on April 30, 1990.

== Career chronology ==
- 1915–1919 Botany instructor, Ohio State University
- 1917–1919 Serves in U.S. Army
- 1919–1927 Botany professor, University of Nebraska
- 1927–1938 Chair of and Professor in Botany Department, University of Oklahoma
- 1936–1938 Columbia University Teachers College (on leave from Oklahoma)
- 1938–1950 Chair of and Professor in Botany Department, Oberlin College, Ohio
- 1948 President of Ecological Society of America
- 1949 President of Ohio Academy of Science
- 1950–1960 Chair and Professor of Yale Conservation Program (graduate level)
- 1951 Received the Frances K. Hutchinson Medal
- 1956 President of American Association of Science
- 1959 President of American Society of Naturalists
- 1963 Received the Richard Prentice Ettinger Award
- 1965 Named Eminent Ecologist by the Ecological Society of America

== Bibliography ==
The following books were written by Paul Sears:

- Deserts on the March (1935) ISBN 0-933280-46-7
- This is Our World (1937) University of Oklahoma Press.
- Who Are These Americans? (1939) Macmillan Co.
- Life and Environment (1939) Bureau of Publications, Teachers College, Columbia University.
- Charles Darwin: The Naturalist as a Cultural Force (1950) Scribners, New York.
- Where There is Life (1962) Dell Publishing Co., New York.
- Biology of the Living Landscape (1964) ASIN B000FMINIE
- Lands Beyond the Forest (1969) ISBN 0-13-522698-8
