= Gunnar Erdtman =

Swedish botanist (1897–1973)

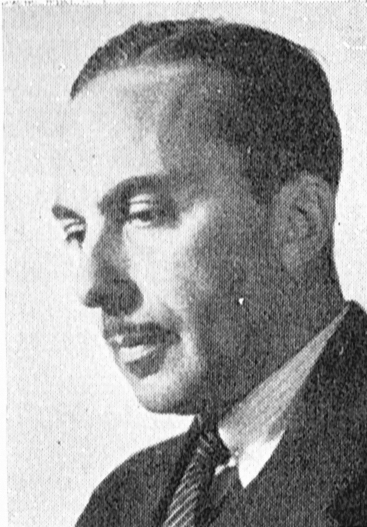

Otto Gunnar Elias Erdtman (18 November 1897 – 18 February 1973) was a Swedish botanist and pioneer in palynology. He introduced methods of pollen analysis through his handbook of palynology and developed the graphical indicator known as the palynogram. He also founded the palynology journal Grana Palynologica (which became Grana in 1970) in 1954.

== Life and work ==
Erdtman was born in Hjorted, Sweden, the eldest child of artist Elias and Otillia (née Fagerlin) Erdtman. An introduction to art came early in life from the father's professional art work and began to sketch from an early age. His father also had an interest in botany. In 1903 the family moved to Stockholm where Gunnar and his brother Holger went to the Norra Latin gymnasium and they both took an interest in plants. At the age of 11 Gunnar made a list of plants at Solvik. Gunnar went to the university and received a doctorate in 1921 with a thesis on pollen studies in German, which made pollen analysis known outside Scandinavia. He studied and worked under Lennart von Post for the study of peat bogs, continuing his work from 1923. His brother Holger became a professor of phytochemistry and together they published a paper in 1933 on the method of acetolysis that removes the protoplasm of pollen and makes their slides durable. In 1938, Gunnar became the first director of the Palynological laboratory and in 1950 he supported the first palynological conference section during the 7th International Botanical Congress at Stockholm. His handbook An introduction to pollen analysis was instrumental in the development of the discipline. In 1948, he created the palynological laboratory at the Swedish Museum of Natural History in Stockholm. He headed the laboratory until 1971, from 1954 with the title of professor.

Erdtman was also interested in music and languages. He would jokingly introduce himself and his wife as "I. M. Pollen" and "U. R. Pollina".
