= Melissopalynology =

Study of pollen contained in honey

Melissopalynology is the study of pollen contained in honey and, in particular, the pollen's source. By studying the pollen in a sample of honey, it is possible to gain evidence of the geographical location and genus of the plants that the honey bees visited, although honey may also contain airborne pollens from anemophilous plants, spores, and dust due to attraction by the electrostatic charge of bees.

In general, melissopalynology is used to combat fraud and inaccurate labelling of honey. Information gained from the study of a given sample of honey (and pollen) is useful when substantiating claims of a particular source for the sample. Monofloral honey derived from one particular source plant may be more valuable than honey derived from many types of plants. The price of honey also varies according to the region from which it originates.

== See also ==
- Apiology – Scientific study of bees
