= Tectin (secretion) =

Tectin is an organic substance secreted by certain ciliates. Tectin may form an adhesive stalk, disc or other sticky secretion. Tectin may also form a gelatinous envelope or membrane enclosing some ciliates as a protective capsule or lorica. Tectin is also called pseudochitin. Granules or rods (called protrichocysts) in the pellicle of some ciliates are also thought to be involved in tectin secretion.

== See also ==
- Chitin
- Conchiolin
- Sporopollenin
