= Orbicule =

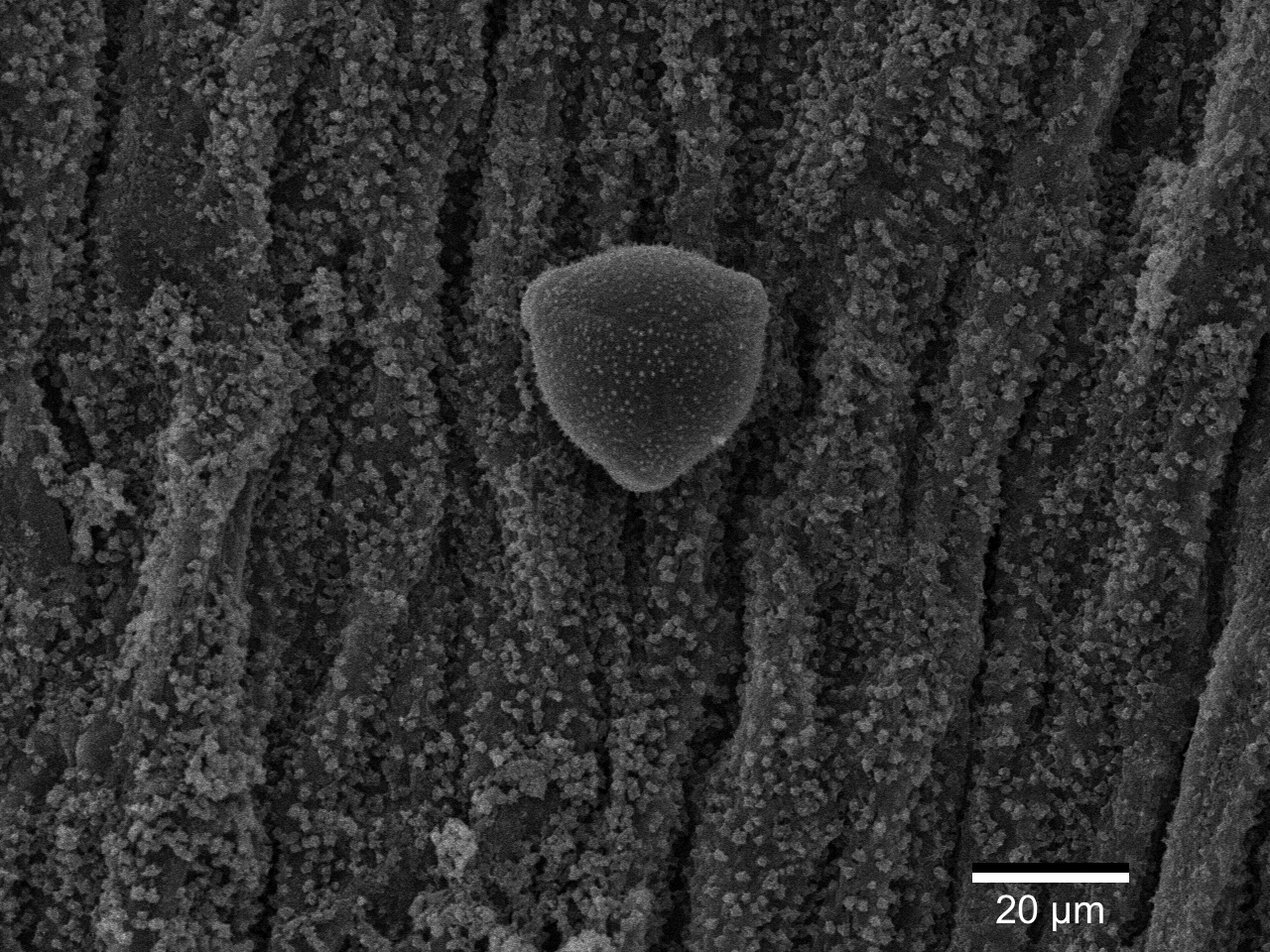
Orbicules and pollen in the anthers of Cubanola domingensis

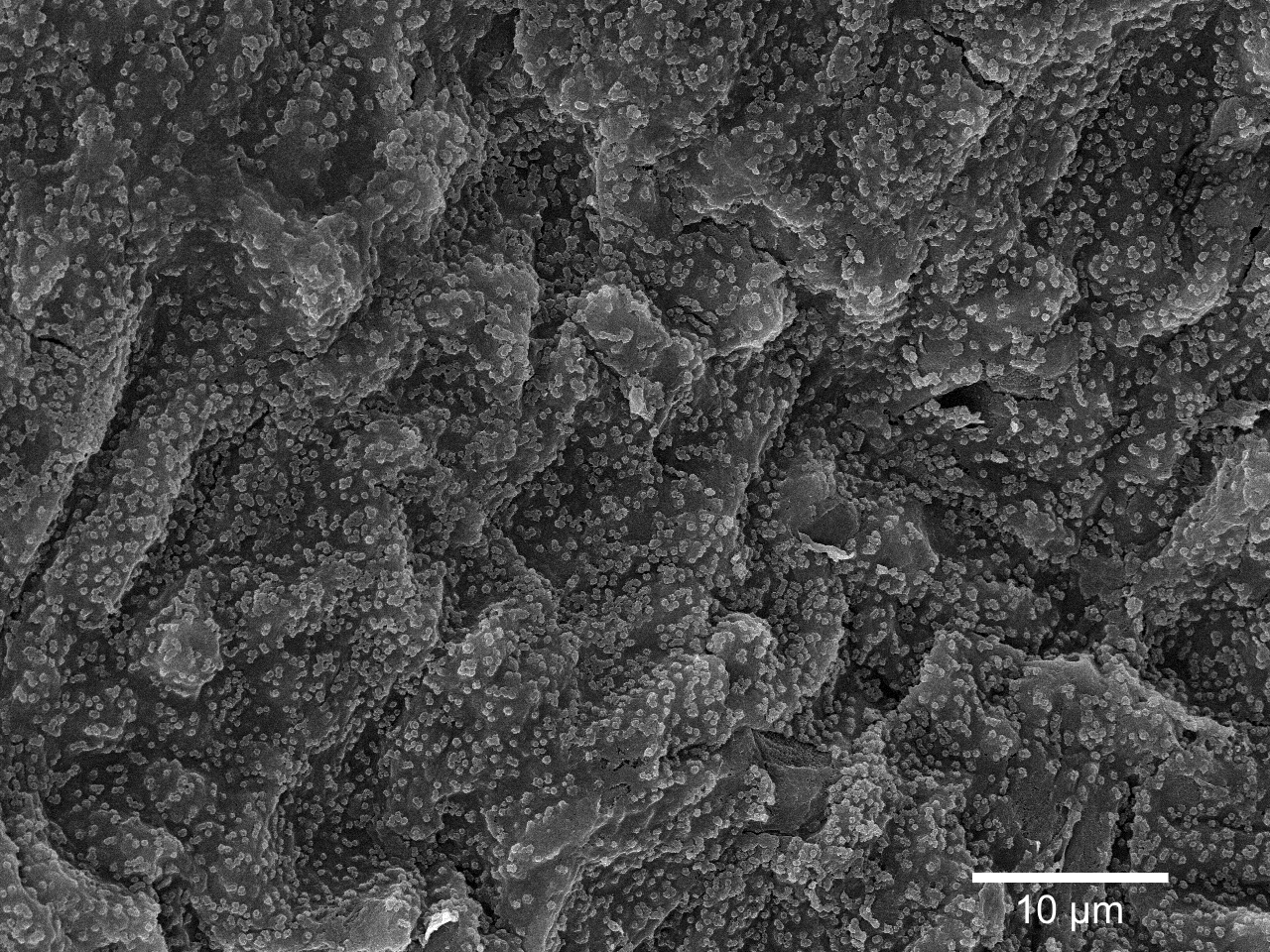
Orbicules in the anthers of Argostemma africanum

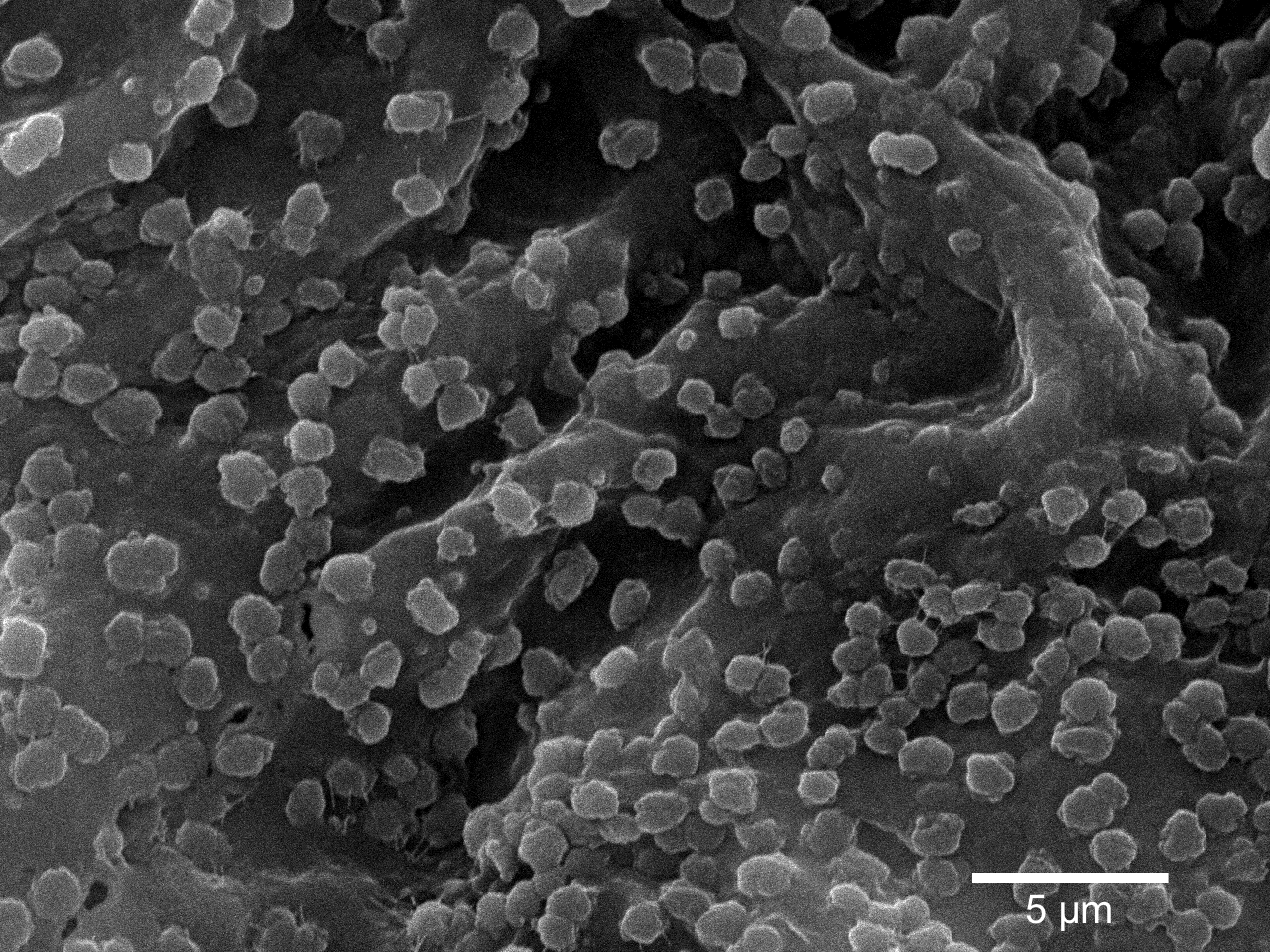
Orbicules in the anthers of Ixora borboniae

Orbicules (syn. Ubisch bodies, con-peito grains) are small acellular structures of sporopollenin that might occur on the inner tangential and radial walls of tapetal cells. The ornamentation of the orbicule surface often resembles that of the pollen sexine. Different hypotheses about their function have been proposed, including them just being a by-product of pollen wall sporopollenin synthesis.

== Discovery ==
In 1865, Rosanoff published observations on anthers of Fabaceae species in which he noticed small granules on the inner locule wall that were resistant to concentrated sulphuric acid. Von Ubisch and Kosmath independently provided the first records of species with and without orbicules and indicated that orbicules are restricted to a secretory tapetum type. Von Ubish concluded that orbicules are homologous with the pollen exine, as both showed the same reaction to chemicals and stains and they developed synchronously. Both von Ubisch and Kosmath are considered as pioneers in orbicule research.

== Name ==
Rosanoff used the terms Körnchen und Tröpfchen, while von Ubisch used Plättchen and Kosmath used kutikulaähnliche Tapetumzellmembran.

The term Ubisch body was introduced by Rowley. This name was however later rejected by Heslop-Harrison because they were not discovered by von Ubisch. In early Japanese literature, they are sometimes called con-peito grains. However, the most commonly used name is orbicule, which was coined by Erdtman and colleagues.

== Morphology ==
Orbicules are morphologically variable. Their size ranges from < 1 μm to 15 μm, but they are usually smaller than 1 μm. Within a single species, orbicule size may vary. There is also variation in the shape of orbicule; they can be spherical, irregular, doughnut-shaped, etc. The orbicular wall can be smooth or ornamented (e.g. with microgranules or microspines) and this ornamentation often shows a striking similarity with the exine ornamentation of the pollen grain. Orbicules are resistant to acetolysis and react to histochemical staining in a similar way as the pollen exine, indicating that they are composed of sporopollenin.

== Development ==
Orbicules originate as lipid droplets (i.e. pro-orbicules) within the cytoplasm of tapetal cells, most likely from the rough endoplasmic reticulum. After exocytosis, the pro-orbicules nest on the tapetal plasmalemma and get a sporopollenin coat synchronously with the developing pollen exine.

== Tapetum ==
There is a positive correlation between the presence of orbicules and a parietal/secretory tapetum type, although species with parietal tapetal cells but lacking orbicules exist as well. Parietal tapeta are the dominant type in land plants and occur in the extant ‘basal’ angiosperm groups and in most fossil taxa; it is therefore considered as the plesiomorphic condition in angiosperms. Hence, the presence of orbicules represents the plesiomorphic character state for angiosperms.

== Distribution ==
Orbicules are present in 123 of 150 investigate angiosperm families. The presence or absence of orbicules is rather constant at the family level: only 24 angiosperm families have both positive and negative observations; the Rubiaceae family is one of them.

== Function ==
The function of orbicules remains enigmatic. In general, there are two views: either orbicules play an active role or they are just a by-product.
