= Sporopollenin =

Biopolymer in pollen grain walls

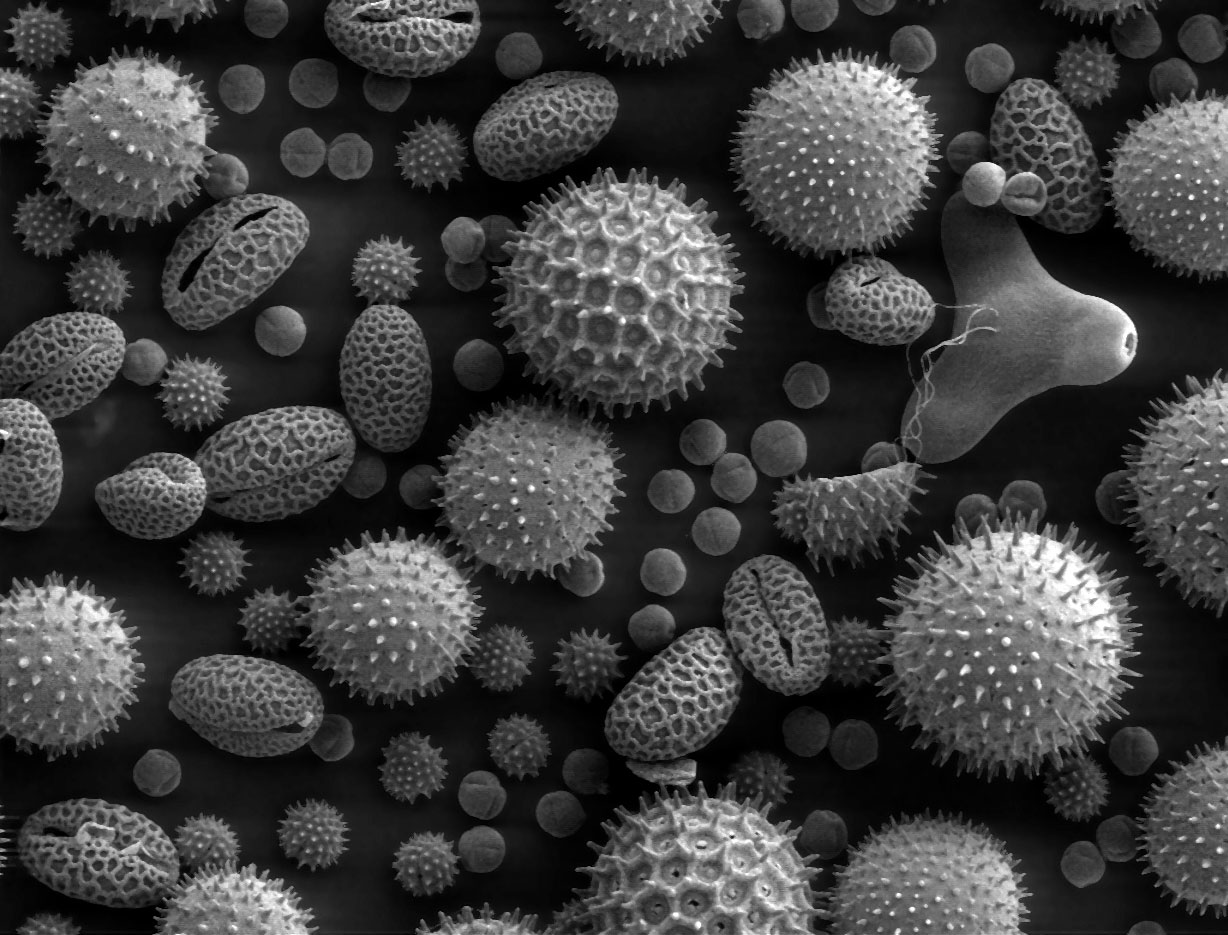
Scanning electron microscope (SEM) image of pollen grains

Sporopollenin is a biological polymer found as a major component of the tough outer (exine) walls of plant spores and pollen grains. It is chemically very stable and has been described as the "toughest material in the plant kingdom". It is well preserved in soils and sediments and with it surviving in spores from the mid‐Ordovician (475 million years ago) providing the earliest evidence of plant life on land.

The exine layer is often intricately sculptured in species-specific patterns, allowing material recovered from (for example) lake sediments to provide useful information to palynologists about past plant and fungal populations. Sporopollenin has found uses in the field of paleoclimatology as well as a marker of past ultraviolet (UVB) levels in the sunlight. Sporopollenin is also found in the cell walls of several taxa of green alga, including Phycopeltis (an ulvophycean) and Chlorella.

Spores are dispersed by many different environmental factors, such as wind, water or animals. In suitable conditions, the sporopollenin-rich walls of pollen grains and spores can persist in the fossil record for hundreds of millions of years, since sporopollenin is resistant to chemical degradation by organic and inorganic chemicals.

== Chemical composition ==
The chemical composition of sporopollenin has long been elusive due to its unusual chemical stability, insolubility and resistance to degradation by enzymes and strong chemical reagents. It was once thought to consist of polymerised carotenoids, but the application of more detailed analytical methods since the 1980s has shown that this is not correct. Analyses have revealed a complex biopolymer, containing mainly long-chain fatty acids, phenylpropanoids, phenolics and traces of carotenoids in a random co-polymer. Sporopollenin likely derives from several precursors that are chemically cross-linked to form a rigid structure. There is also good evidence that the chemical composition of sporopollenin is not the same in all plants, indicating it is a class of compounds rather than having one constant structure.

In 2019, thioacidolysis degradation and solid-state NMR was used to determine the molecular structure of pitch pine sporopollenin, finding it primarily composed of polyvinyl alcohol units alongside other aliphatic monomers, all crosslinked through a series of acetal linkages. Its complex and heterogeneous chemical structure gives some protection from the biodegradative enzymes of bacteria, fungi and animals. Some aromatic structures based on p-coumarate and naringenin were also identified within the sporopollenin polymer. These can absorb ultraviolet (UV) light, preventing it from penetrating further into the spore. This is relevant to the role of pollen and spores in transporting and dispersing gametes of plants. The DNA of the gametes is readily damaged by the ultraviolet component of daylight. Sporopollenin thus provides some protection from these damages as well as a physically robust container.

Analyses of sporopollenin from the clubmoss Lycopodium in the late 1980s have shown distinct structural differences from that of flowering plants. In 2020, more detailed analysis of sporopollenin from Lycopodium clavatum provided more structural information. It showed a complete lack of aromatic structures and the presence of a macrocyclic backbone of polyhydroxylated tetraketide-like monomers with pseudo-aromatic 2-pyrone rings. These were crosslinked to a poly(hydroxy acid) chain by ether linkages to form the polymer.

== Biosynthesis ==
Electron microscopy shows that the tapetal cells that surround the developing pollen grain in the anther have a highly active secretory system containing lipophilic globules. These globules are believed to contain sporopollenin precursors. Tracer experiments have shown that phenylalanine is a major precursor, but other carbon sources also contribute. The biosynthetic pathway for phenylpropanoid is very active in tapetal cells, supporting the idea that its products are needed for sporopollenin synthesis. Chemical inhibitors of pollen development and many male sterile mutants affect the secretion of these globules by tapetal cells.

== Ultraviolet protection and paleoclimatology ==
Sporopollenin contain phenolic components that absorb both UVA and UVB, acting to protect internal cell components including DNA against ultraviolet damages. Plants regulate production of these phenolic components given UV exposure, making them a paleoclimatological marker for past UV levels.

== See also ==
- Chitin
- Conchiolin
- Tectin
