= List of Glagolitic inscriptions (16th century) =

Below is a list 16th century of Glagolitic inscriptions. For other related lists, see:

- Lists of Glagolitic inscriptions
- List of early Glagolitic inscriptions (before 1500)
- List of later Glagolitic inscriptions (after 1600)

Light gray represents inscriptions lost before a reproduction could be made.
Blue represents inscriptions in which Glagolitic is or may be mixed with Cyrillic.
Light brown represents inscriptions which may or may not be Glagolitic.

== 1500–1519 ==
Date	Place	Transcription	Name and Notes	Images	Sources
1500	Lovran (sv. Jurja)	Ⱍ Ⱇ			
1500s	Pićan (sv. Mihovila na groblju)	Ⱍ Ⱇ			
1500–04–06	Štrped (sv. Duha)	Ⱍ·Ⱇ ⰮⰔⰜ ⰀⰒⰓⰋⰎⰀ · ⰄⰐⰬ ·Ⰵ·	Štrped inscription. Ligatures: ⰒⰓ.	(Note: ·)	
1500 (about)	Hum (kuća br. 3)	ⰋⰂⰀⰐⰀ▵	Discovered in 1983 by Bruno Viskić, a chef from Lovran, while cleaning the old house he purchased that year from Olivijo Gržinić. It was on the first floor (not the ground floor). Engraver: Ivan (if genitive), or possibly Ivana.		
1500 (about)	Jajce	ⰂⰀ ⰂⰓⰋⰮⰅ ⰖⰈⰮⰑⰆⰐⰑⰃ ⰍⰐⰅⰈⰀ ⰗⰅⰓⰅⰐⰜⰀ ⰁⰅⰓⰋⰔⰀⰎⰋⰛⰀ	Jajce inscription.		
1500 (about)	Ladići by Kanfanar	ⰝⰗⰕⰑⰅⰃⰁ? ⰃⰓⰃⰖⰓⰀ ⰄⰖⰁⰓⰀ ⰂⰜⰀⰋ[Ⱀ]ⰅⰃ[Ⰰ] ⰄⰋ	Ladići inscription		
1500 (about)	Trieste	ROTATOMNEFATVM; CⰑЗⰂSJBⰮDVSⰀΜ·ЗV·C; ANN·ABVRB·COND·IIMIL·Ⱉ·LXIII·SALVT·M·CCCC·?VIII; IVN·IOAN·BAPTISTAERETʀ·CHRISToⰗoRICANCELLARII·FILII·AVITAE FABR·ADDIDER· SIBI SVISQ·LEGITIMIS HAEREDIB·AD COMMVN·VSVM EREXERVNT	Trieste Glagolitic inscription. Inscription on the doorway of what used to be the Conti house, at Via S. Maria Maggiore 2. Later, the stone was taken to the garden of the Archaeological museum in Trieste. A photograph was taken and published in 1946. Latinic З-shaped Z is used for Ⰵ.	(Note: , 1946)	
1500 (about)	Turanj (sv. Marije na groblju)	ⰑⰂⰑⰅⰃⰓⰑⰁⰔⰖⰄ ⰜⰀ ⰮⰀⰕⰋⰀⰞⰋ	On the gravestone of judge Matijašić. Ligatures: ⰃⰓ.		
1501	Godešič (sv. Nikole)	ⰕⰑⰒⰋⰔⰀ ⰒⰅⰕⰀⰓⰬ ⰋⰈⰁⰖⰆⰀ ⰒⰮⰑⰈⰋ ⰮⰖ ⰁⰑⰃⰬ Ⱍ Ⱇ Ⰰ	One of the Godešič Glagolitic inscriptions. Ligatures: ⰕⰑ.		
1501	Kanfanar (sv. Antona)	Ⱍ Ⱇ Ⰰ ⰐⰀⰄⰐ[Ⱜ/Ⰵ]	One of the newly discovered graffitos. Ligatures: ⰄⰐ.		
1501	Omišalj (Uznesenja BDM)	Ⱍ Ⱇ Ⰰ ⰒⰑⰒ ⰣⰓⰅ	On the left side of the doorway. Ligatures: ⰒⰑ, ⰣⰓ.		
1501	Žminj (sv. Antuna pustinjaka)	Ⱍ·Ⱇ·Ⰰ ⰕⰑ ⰒⰋⰔⰀ ⰡⰍⰑⰂⰬ	Engraver: Jakov from Rakalj son of the župan (the hand of this inscription matches that of the graffito by this Jakov). Ligatures: ⰕⰑ, ⰍⰑ, ⰔⰀ.		
1502	Lovran (sv. Jurja)	Ⱍ Ⱇ Ⰱ			
1502	Vlašići on Pag (sv. Jeronima)	Ⱍ Ⱇ Ⰱ Ⰰ ⰀⰂ? Ⰺ Ⰾ...ⰄⰑⰮ?	On a stone bench in front of the church. The inscription is not lost, but covered in a layer of concrete.		
1503-11	Cveki by Mutvoran (kuće br. 274 i 275)	·Ⱍ·Ⱇ·Ⰲ· ⰮⰔⰅⰜⰀ · ⰐⰑⰂⰁⰓⰬ ⰁⰓⰐⰓⰄⰑ ⰔⰅ ⰒⰋⰔⰀ ⰑⰄⰬ ⰓⰀⰍⰎⰀⰬ	Secondarily used between two residential houses. Engraver: Brnardo of Rakalj. Ligatures: ⰁⰓ, ⰄⰑ, ⰑⰄ, ⰜⰀ, ⰔⰀ, ⰓⰀ, ⰎⰀ. Other Glagolitic inscriptions were seen in the middle of the graveyard in the 1860s by an anonymous author writing in an 1880 edition of Naša Sloga (tentatively identified with J. Volčić or J. Batel by Fučić), but around 1900 the graveyard was renovated and some old gravestones were broken up and used as building material for the wall surrounding the graveyard. Kirac could still read several letters on a fragment on the northwest corner, writing before 1928.		
1503	Beram (sv. Marije na Škrilinah, sjeverni zid)	Ⱍ Ⱇ Ⰲ			
1503	Dvigrad (sv. Marije od Lokvića)	·Ⱍ·Ⱇ·Ⰲ ⰕⰖ ⰁⰡ ⰆⰀⰍⰀⰐⰬ ⰋⰂⰀⰐ ⰈⰁⰀⰓⰁⰀⰐⰀ ⰐⰅⰕⰌⰀⰍ ⰓⰀⰋⰐⰋⰍⰀ ⰒⰓⰅ ⰈⰀⰘⰀⰓⰋⰅ ⰁⰬ ⰃⰀ ⰒⰑⰮⰋⰎⰖⰋ ⰀⰮⰅⰐ	Engraver: deacon Ivan of Barban (nephew of priest Zaharija). Ligatures: ⰕⰖ, ⰒⰓ, ⰒⰑ, ⰀⰐ, ⰘⰀ.		
1503?	Čirkoti by Završje (sv. Primusa i Felicijana)	Ⱍ Ⱇ ......	On a gravestone in the church graveyard. Žubrinić proposed a reading "1503" for the date, which had previously been read "1603". Considered destroyed until its rediscovery in the doorway of a graveyard building in autumn 2016, partially covered by the stones of the wall.		
1504	Beram (sv. Marije na Škrilinah, južni zid)	Ⱍ Ⱇ Ⰳ ⰒⰓⰋⰐⰅⰔⰑⰞⰅ ⰈⰀ Ⱀ ⰃⰄⰂ ⰄⰂⰀ ⰃⰓⰎⰋⰝⰋⰛⰀ ⰋⰎⰋ Ⰴ ⰒⰕⰡⰐⰜⰀ ⰃⰑⰎⰖⰁⰋⰐⰀ	Ligatures: ⰒⰓ, ⰃⰄⰂ, ⰄⰂⰀ, ⰃⰓ, ⰎⰖ, ⰈⰀ, ⰜⰀ, ⰐⰀ.		
1504	Kastav (sv. Trojstva)	[Ⱍ]·Ⱇ·Ⰳ			
1505, 1653	Dolenja Vas	Ⱍ Ⱈ Ⰶ Ⰲ	A lintel fragment whose original 1505 (Ⱍ Ⱇ Ⰴ) inscription was altered to 1653 either as a correction or a reuse. Discovered by Fučić in May 1947. After that, someone took it out of the wall and exhibited it. Lost as of 1982.		
1505	Vrbnik (sv. Marije)	ⰂⰋⰮⰅ ⰁⰑⰆⰋⰅ ⰀⰮ[ⰅⰐ] Ⱍ Ⱇ Ⰴ ⰕⰖ ⰜⰓⰋⰍⰂⰖ ⰖⰝⰋⰐⰋ ⰄⰑⰮⰋⰐ ⰂⰋⰄ ⰐⰀⰝⰀⰔⰕⰬ ⰁⰆⰐⰅ ⰄⰂⰋ Ⱞ ⰀⰓⰋⰅ ⰀⰮⰅⰞⰕⰓⰋ ⰁⰋⰞⰅ ⰮⰀⰓⰍⰑ ⰋⰂⰀⰐⰬ ⰒⰅⰕⰓ	Vrbnik inscription (1505). Engraver: Marko, Ivan or Petar. Ligatures: ⰄⰂ, ⰕⰓ.		
1506	Svetivinčenat (sv. Katarine)	ⰕⰑⰒⰋⰔⰀ ⰆⰀⰍⰀⰐⰬ ⰔⰕⰅⰒⰀⰐⰬ Ⱍ·Ⱇ·Ⰵ Ⱍ Ⱇ Ⰵ	Engraver: deacon Stepan. Ligatures: ⰕⰑ.		
1507-10	Baška (sv. Mihovil)	ⰂⰋⰮⰅ ⰘⰔⰂ𞀑 ⰀⰮⰐ ... Ⱍ·Ⱇ·Ⰶ ⰑⰍⰕ [ⰅⰁⰓⰀ ⰮⰋⰔⰅⰜⰀ Ⱅ]Ⱁ ⰈⰋⰄⰀ [ⰒⰑⰒ ⰁⰀⰓⰍⰑ] ⰒⰀⰒⰛ ⰔⰂⰑⰋⰮ ⰁⰎⰀⰃⰑⰮ ⰍⰀⰒⰅⰎⰐ ⰂⰜⰓⰍⰂⰋ ⰔⰕⰃⰀ ⰮⰘⰑⰂⰋⰎⰀ ·M·D·6·PB·	Baška inscription (1507). Engraver: priest Barko Papić. Below it is a Latin inscription by pre Bartolomeo with the date 1506. Barko Papić wrote his will on 17 March 1527 and died on 1 July 1527, as preserved in a fragment of the notary book of Ivan Mantaković. Ligatures: ⰂⰋ, ⰂⰑ, ⰃⰄ, ⰑⰂⰋ, ⰃⰀ, ⰎⰀ.		
1507	Bale (sv. Antona, sjeverni zid lađe)	·ⱍ·ⱇ·ⰶ·ⱅ𞀑ⱂⰻⱄⰰ ⱇⱃⰰ ⰱⰰⱃⱅⱁⰾ ⰸⰱ𞀓ⰻⱀⰰ ......	Below and to the left of the inscription of Matija Pokrajčić. Engraver: fra Bartol of Brinje. Ligatures for ⰕⰑ, ⰁⰓ.		
1507	Jesenovik (sv. Kvirina)	·Ⱍ·Ⱇ·Ⰶ· ⰍⰀⰄⰀ ⰁⰋ ⰔⰂⰓⰞⰅⰐⰀ ⰕⰀ ⰒⰑⰐⰅⰔ ⰕⰓⰀ	Above a church window. Ligatures: ⰀⰄ, ⰒⰑ, ⰄⰀ. Commemorates the construction of a new window.		
1507	Lovran (sv. Jurja)	Ⰲ ⰋⰮⰅ ⰁⰑⰆⰅ ⰀⰮⰅⰐⰬ ⰎⰡⰕ ⰃⰑⰔⰒⰄⰋⰘ Ⱍ Ⱇ Ⰶ	Ligatures: ⰁⰑ.		
1508–03–20	Beram (sv. Marije na Škrilinah, južni zid)	Ⱍ Ⱇ Ⰷ ⰮⰋⰔⰅⰜⰀ ⰮⰀⰓⰝⰀ ⰐⰀ ⰄⰐⰋ Ⰻ	Below Beram inscription 110.		
1508	Barban (sv. Antuna, južni zid)	ⰰ ⱄⰻⰵ ⱂⰻⱄⰰ ⱂ𞀑ⱂ ⱞⰻⰽ𞀖ⰾⰰ ⰽⰰⱂⰵⰾⰰⱀ ⰲⱃⰰⰽⰾⰻ ⰽⰰⰴⰰ ⰸⰰⱆⰼⰵⱎⰵ ⰳ𞀑ⱄⱂ𞀑ⰴⰰ ⰱⱀⰵⱌⰻ ⰲⱄ𞀖 ⰻⱄⱅ𞀓ⱆ ⱞⰻⰾⰵⰸⰻⱀ ·ⱍ·ⱇ·ⰷ·	Commemorates the conquest of Istria by Venice. Engraver: priest Mikula chaplain in Raklja. Ligatures: ⰒⰑ, ⰍⰖ, ⰂⰓ, ⰃⰑ, ⰔⰖ, ⰕⰓ.		
1509-07	Kastav	Ⱍ Ⱇ Ⰸ ⰋⰣⰎⰅⰡ	Found in the bakery in the southeast bastion of the city walls. Now lost. Transcription but no reproduction survives in the manuscript Arhiv HAZU VIII-161 by Vjekoslav Spinčić.		
1509–08–28	Kastav (kuća br. 23/24)	Ⱍ Ⱇ Ⰸ ⰀⰂⰃⰖⰔⰕⰀ ⰋⰇ ⰒⰑⰒ ⰕⰑⰮⰀ ⰄⰓⰐⰅⰂⰋⰛ·	Engraver: priest Toma Drnević. Originally a lintel. The house it was in was owned by Jela Bezjakova, but was lost during the destruction and renovation of the house in 1900. Only a fragment was found in 1970, but a reproduction of the whole inscription by Volčić from 1880 survives.		
1509–10–28	Pićan (sv. Mihovila na groblju)	·Ⱍ·Ⱇ·Ⰸ ⰔⰋⰅ ⰒⰔⰀ ⰒⰑⰒ Ⰰ[Ⱀ]ⰄⰓⰅⰋⰛ ⰁⰑ... ⰐⰀ ⰄⰀⰐⰬ ⰔⰂⰃⰀ ⰔⰋⰮⰖⰐⰀ ⰋⰣⰄⰅ	Engraver: pop Andrejić. Ligatures: ⰒⰑ, ⰐⰄⰓ, ⰁⰑ, ⰐⰀ, ⰄⰀ. Dated the day of Saints Simon and Jude.		
1509	Contovello (Madonna della Salvia)	Ⱍ Ⱇ Ⰸ			
1510	Beram (sv. Marije na Škrilinah, sjeverni zid)	·Ⱍ·Ⱇ·Ⰹ·			
1510	Beram (sv. Marije na Škrilinah, južni zid)	Ⱍ Ⱇ Ⰹ ...			
1510	Dobrinj (sv. Stjepan)	ⰅⰈⰖⰔ ⰮⰀⰓⰡ ⰂⰋⰮⰅ ⰃⰐⰅ ⰀⰮ ⰅⰐ ⰎⰅⰕ ⰃⰐⰋⰘ Ⱍ Ⱇ Ⰹ ⰂⰕ Ⱁ ⰂⰓⰅⰮⰅ ⰁⰡⰔ ⰓⰞⰅⰐⰀⰍⰀⰒⰅⰎ Ⰰ ⰑⰕⰀ ⰒⰎ ⰐⰀ ⰒⰓⰀⰞⰋⰮⰖⰐⰀ ⰋⰍⰀⰞⰕⰀⰎ ⰄⰀ ⰒⰑⰒⰀ ⰔⰕⰋⰒⰀⰐⰀ ⰋⰍⰀⰒⰋⰕⰖⰎⰀ ⰋⰒⰓⰑⰝⰀⰡ	Dobrinj inscription (1510). Commemorates the construction of a new sanctuary in the church. Ligatures: ⰂⰕ, ⰕⰀ, ⰎⰂ, ⰒⰓ, ⰕⰎ, ⰒⰑ.		
1511	Luka, Sali	Ⱍ Ⱇ Ⰰ Ⰹ · ⰕⰑⰮⰖ · ⰎⰅⰆⰋ · ⰄⰑⰮⰋⰐⰬ ⰒⰅⰕⰀⰓⰬ · ⰔⰋⰐⰬ · ⰃⰓⰃⰖⰓⰀ · Ⱎ...ⰎⰀ · Ⰸ ⰑⰮⰀⰃⰖⰓⰀⰘⰬ · ⰒⰀⰓⰑⰘⰋⰡⰐⰬ · ⰜⰓ^{Ⰻ}ⰍⰂⰅ · ⰔⰂⰅⰕⰑⰃⰀ · ⰔⰕⰋⰒⰀⰐⰀ· Ⰲ ⰎⰖⰜⰋ · Ⰻ · Ⱄ ⰎⰖⰆⰋ · ⰓⰅⰝⰅⰐⰖ ⰜⰓⰋⰍⰂⰖ · Ⰻ ... Ⰾ ⰡⰕⰬ · ⰓⰅⰄⰑⰂⰐⰋⰜⰋ · ⰁⰓⰀⰕⰃⰑ ⰮⰑ Ⱑ · ⰮⰑⰎⰋⰕⰅ ⰁⰑⰃⰀ · ⰈⰀ ⰮⰅ ·	Luka inscription (1511). Original lost but a reproduction made by Ivan Berčić during his visit in August 1866 survives.		
1511	Novi Vinodolski (sv. Fabijana i Sebastijana)	ⰂⰀ ⰋⰮⰅ ⰁⰆⰅ ⰀⰮⰅⰐⰬ ⰎⰡⰕⰬ ⰃⰄⰐⰋⰘⰬ Ⱍ·Ⱇ·ⰀⰉ· ⰂⰀ ⰂⰓⰋⰮⰅ ⰒⰓⰅⰔⰂⰕⰑⰃⰀ ⰑⰜⰀ Ⰻ ⰃⰄⰐⰀ ⰃⰄⰐⰀ ⰋⰣⰎⰋⰡ ⰒⰒⰅ Ⰱ ⰎⰡⰕⰑ ⰐⰅⰃⰀ Ⰷ Ⰻ Ⰱ ⰋⰞⰅ ⰕⰄⰀ ⰐⰞⰬ ⰃⰄⰐⰬ ⰂⰈⰂⰅⰎⰋⰝⰅⰐⰋ ⰍⰐⰅⰈ ⰁⰓⰐⰀⰄⰋⰐⰬ Ⰻ ⰁⰞⰅ ⰕⰄⰀ ⰒⰎⰑⰂⰀⰐⰬ ⰃⰄⰐⰬ ⰀⰐⰄⰓⰋⰋ ⰕⰄⰀ ⰁⰋ	Novi inscription (1511). Commemorates the construction of the Church of Saint Fabian and Sebastian as protectors from the plague. Once part of the belltower, but the church was demolished in 1909. Now kept at Hrvatski povijesni muzej in Zagreb (as 6808). Ligatures: ⰃⰄ, ⰒⰓ, ⰔⰂⰕ, ⰣⰎⰋ, ⰎⰡⰕⰑ, ⰕⰄ, ⰅⰎⰋ, ⰒⰎⰑⰂ, ⰃⰀ, ⰄⰀ.		
1512-10	Hrastovlje (sv. Trojstva)	·Ⱍ·Ⱇ·Ⰱ·Ⰹ· ⰑⰍⰕⰅⰁⰓⰀ ⰐⰀ ⰔⰕⰀ ⰮⰀⰓⰕⰋⰐⰀ ⰄⰐ ⰕⰑ ⰒⰋⰔⰀⰘ Ⱑ ⰒⰓⰅ ⰮⰍⰖⰎⰀⰞ ⰁⰖⰄⰖⰛⰋ ⰗⰀⰓⰮⰀⰐ ⰂⰕⰑ ⰂⰓⰅⰮⰅ	Engraver: Mikulaš parish priest of Kubed. Dated the day of Saint Martin, but in October.		
1512	Brušane (sv. Martina)	ⰎⰅⰕ ⰃⰑⰔⰒⰑⰄⰐⰋⰘ I B T Ⱍ Ⱇ Ⰹ Ⰱ ⰂⰕⰑ ⰂⰓ	A rubbing was made by Janko Bišćan, which was kept among the remains of Mijat Sabljar (Arhiv HAZU XV-12 VI b 4). Lost between Bišćan and Fučić but rediscovered by parish priest Nikola Turkalj on 21 October 2011.		
1511/1512	Hrastovlje (sv. Trojstva)				
1514–02–10	Bakar	·Ⱍ·Ⱇ·Ⰳ·Ⰹ·ⰒⰓⰂⰀⰓⰀ·Ⰹ·	Natpis na pragu prozora župne kuće. Commemorated the date the window was built in the parish priest's house. Lost between the time Mažić wrote his 1896 book and Fučić's visit to Bakar.		
1514	Dubašnica (sv. Apolinara)	Ⱍ·Ⱇ·Ⰹ·Ⰳ· ⰕⰑ ⰖⰝⰋⰐⰋ Ⱞ[Ⰵ]ⰞⰕ[Ⰰ]Ⱃ ⰋⰂⰀⰐⰬ ⰔⰑⰓⰮⰋⰎⰋⰛⰬ	Engraver: master Ivan Sormilić. In the mid-19th century it was before or on the Crkva sv. Marije Karmelske in Bogovići but the Crkva sv. Apolinara was built on top of it. It is now lost. Only transcriptions survive.		
1514	Klimno (kuća br. 12)	Ⱍ Ⱇ Ⰹ Ⰳ ⰡⰍⰑⰂⰬ ⰮⰀⰎⰀⰕⰅⰞⰕⰋⰐⰋⰛⰬ	Engraver: Jakov Malateštinić. Ligatures: ⰃⰉ, ⰎⰀ.		
1516–02–22	Bribir	Ⱍ Ⱇ Ⰵ. Ⰹ. ⰮⰔⰜⰀ ⰒⰓⰂⰀ Ⰰ ⰄⰀⰐ ꙋⰋⰁ	On a residential home once belonging to the kanonik Kaliman. Survives only in transcription of Kukuljević. Ligatures: ⰒⰓⰂⰀ/ⰒⰓⰂⰓ.		
1516-04	Bale (sv. Antuna, sjeverni zid lađe)	ⱍ ⱇ ⰵ ⰹ ⱞⰻⱄⰵⱌⰰ ⰰⱂ𞀓ⰰ ? ⰴⰰⱀ	Partly still covered by lime. Ligature for ⱂⱃ.		
1516–07–02	Hum (sv. Jeronima na groblju)	ⰋⰍ ⰗⰖⰋⰕ ⰒⰓⰅⰈⰁⰋⰕⰓ ⰔⰋⰮⰑⰐ ⰄⰅ ⰓⰑⰜⰑ·Ⱍ·Ⱇ·ⰅⰉ ⰋⰣⰎⰡⰡ·Ⰱ· ⰑⰂⰄⰀ ⰁⰅⰐⰅⰕⰜⰋ ⰖⰈⰅⰞⰅ ⰑⰒⰅⰕ ⰁⰓⰅⰞⰖ ⰋⰮⰡⰘⰖ ⰔⰍⰓⰀ[ⰎⰅⰮ ⰮⰀⰔ]ⰋⰮⰋⰡⰐⰑⰮ ⰋⰔⰒⰓⰑⰝ[ⰋⰮ]Ⰻ ⰓⰀⰕ ⰓⰅⰃⰋ ⰗⰓⰀⰐⰍⰓⰖⰮⰬ ...ⰮⰬ	Hum inscription (1516). Engraver: priest Šimun Greblo of Roč. Commemorates the capture of Brescia during the War of the League of Cambrai. Ligatures: ⰒⰓ, others.		
1516–08–20	Roč (kuća Fabris)	[ⰂⰋⰮⰅ] ⰘⰂ Ⱍ·Ⱇ·ⰅⰉ ⰀⰃⰖⰔ Ⰴ ·Ⰻ· ⰑⰔⰐⰑⰂⰀ Ⱂ ⰔⰮⰐ ⰁⰎ...ⰋⰛ [Ⰲ]ⰕⰑ ⰂⰓⰮⰅ Ⰱ[ⰋⰂ]ⰞⰋ · Ⰰ...	Engraver: pop Simun Bl...ić. Discovered by Kukuljević, but already Milčetić could not find it in 1908, because it had been carried off to Trieste by doctor Sandrin, a lawyer in Buzet.		
1516	Beram (sv. Marije na Škrilinah, južni zid)	Ⱍ Ⱇ Ⰵ Ⰹ ⰮⰋⰔⰅⰜⰀ			
1516	Sutivanac (kuća br. 5)	Ⱍ Ⱇ Ⰵ Ⰹ ⰆⰖ ⰒⰀⰐ ⰓⰕⰖⰎ ⰜⰬⰂⰋⰕⰋ Ⱋ	Engraver: župan Bartul Cvitić.		
1516 (about)	Trg, Karlovac County (Svih svetih)	Ⰲ ⰋⰮⰅ ⰁⰑⰆⰅ ... ⰎⰅⰆⰅ ⰃⰄⰐ ... ⰎⰅⰕ ... ⰁⰅⰐⰍⰑ ⰡⰍⰑⰂⰝⰋⰛ ⰒⰎⰁⰐⰞ ⰂⰔⰘ ⰔⰕⰋⰘ	On a gravestone. Benko Jakovčić was the parish priest between 1501 and 1516. It was barely legible in the time of Kukuljević and Lopašić, and by that of Fučić it had completely worn down.		
1517–04–29	Ćokovac by Pašman (sv. Kuzme i Damjana)	·Ⱍ·Ⱇ·ⰆⰉ·ⰀⰒⰓⰋⰎⰀ·ⰐⰄⰐⰬ· ·Ⰻ·Ⰸ·ⰒⰓⰋ ⰖⰓⰬⰄⰑⰮⰀⰐⰕⰑⰐⰁⰑⰃⰄⰐ ⰋⰛⰬ ⰔⰍⰑⰎⰖⰄⰓⰋ·ⰖⰝⰋⰐⰋⰕⰑ	Ćokovac inscription (1517). On the lintel of the refectory. Ligatures: ⰆⰉ, ⰒⰓ, ⰋⰎ, ⰕⰑⰐ, ⰃⰄ, ⰑⰎ. First mentioned in Bianchi 1879 (Zara cristiana volume II, page 134).	(Note: , CH)	
1517 (July 19/28)	Hrastovlje (sv. Trojstva)	Ⱍ·Ⱇ·Ⰹ·Ⰶ·ⰐⰀⰄⰐ ⰔⰃⰑ ⰐⰀⰈⰀⰓⰋⰀ ⰍⰀⰄⰀ ⰁⰋ ⰒⰓⰐⰅⰔⰅⰐ ⰐⰑⰂⰋ ⰒⰓⰀⰮⰐⰕ	Dated the day of Saint Nazarius, which was on the 19th if Saint Nazarius bishop of nearby Koper, but the 28th if short for ⰐⰀⰈⰀⰓⰋⰀ ⰋⰜⰅⰎⰋⰔⰀ and thus Nazarius and Celsus).		
1517	Bakar	Ⱍ Ⱇ ⰆⰉ ⰃⰄⰐⰬ ⰀⰃⰀⰒⰋⰕⰬ	Discovered in the ruins of a house on Fortica below the parish church, by house number 218. The house was already in ruins by about 1890, at which time it belonged to the Pažolin family. The inscription was removed from there to the Gradski muzej in Bakar in 1956. Ligatures for ⰆⰉ, ⰃⰄ, ⰃⰀ.		
1517	Bakar	Ⱍ·Ⱇ·Ⰶ[·Ⰹ]... ⰑⰂ[ⰖⰍⰖⰛⰖⰝⰋⰐⰋⰝ]ⰐⰋⰕⰃⰄⰐⰬⰀ ⰃⰀⰒⰋⰕⰬⰈⰂ[Ⱁ]Ⰾ^{Ⱆ}[ⰁⰑⰆⰖ]Ⰽ[ⰋⰁⰖ]ⰄⰅⰖⰆⰂ^{Ⰰ}Ⱅ^{Ⱜ}ⰔⰒ𞀑ⰮⰐⰋⰔⰅ ⰐⰀ𞀑Ⱞ Ⰵ	Discovered in the ruins of a house on Fortica below the parish church, by house number 218. The house was already in ruins by about 1890. By that time the inscription, broken in two, had been repurposed as the first step of the entrance into a garden built in the ruins of that house, which led to the wear of the letters in the middle. The inscription was removed from there to the Gradski muzej in Bakar in 1956. Ligatures for ⰆⰉ, ⰃⰄ, ⰃⰀ, ⰈⰂ, ⰆⰂ, ⰒⰑ.		
1517	Kosinjski Bakovac (sv. Vida)	ⰜⰋⰮⰅⰓⰍⰐⰅⰈⰀ ⰀⰐⰆⰀ Ⱇ	Bakovac inscription (1517). It was originally in the ruins of the old church by the Ribnik castle, used during the construction of the Crkva sv. Vida in 1769. Date is incorrectly given by Strohal as 1503.	(Note: , CH, 1982)	
1517–06–19	Kosinjski Bakovac (sv. Vida)	·Ⱍ·Ⱇ·ⰆⰉⰮⰋⰔⰅⰜⰀ·ⰋⰣⰐⰀ ⰄⰀⰐ Ⰸ Ⰹ ⰂⰀⰂⰓⰋⰮⰅⰂⰈⰎⰋⰝⰅⰐⰑⰃⰀⰋⰈ ⰮⰑⰆⰐⰑⰃⰀⰃⰄⰋⰐⰀⰍⰐⰅⰈⰀⰀⰐⰆⰀⰗ Ⰽ̃Ⱄ̃Ⱞ̃ⰋⰒ̃ⰬⰝⰀⰡⰋⰂⰀⰂⰓⰋⰮⰅⰒⰎⰅⰮⰅⰐⰋⰕⰑ ⰃⰀⰋⰒⰑⰝⰕⰀⰐⰑⰃⰀⰝⰍⰀⰋⰂⰀⰐⰀⰮⰀⰓ ⰕⰐⰖⰞⰅⰂⰋⰛⰀ ⰍⰋⰁⰋⰞⰑⰕⰑⰮⰖⰔⰎꙊⰃⰄⰑ	Ligatures: ⰆⰉ, ⰃⰄ, ⰒⰎ, ⰀⰐ. It was originally in the ruins of the old church by the Ribnik castle, used during the construction of the Crkva sv. Vida in 1769.	(Note: , CH, 1982)	
1518–05–15	Brinje (sv. Marije)	Ⱍ Ⱇ Ⰷ Ⰹ ⰮⰋⰔⰅⰜⰀ ⰮⰀⰡ ⰐⰀ ⰄⰀⰐ ·Ⰴ·Ⰹ· ⰁⰋ ⰒⰑⰔⰕⰀⰂⰎⰅⰐⰀ ⰞⰍⰓⰋⰎⰬ·ⰐⰀ ⰃⰓⰑⰁ·ⰍⰐⰅⰈⰀ ⰮⰀⰕⰋⰡⰞⰀ ⰝⰖⰁⰓⰀⰐⰋⰛⰀ·ⰂⰅⰓⰐⰑⰃⰀ ⰍⰐⰅⰈⰖ ⰀⰐⰕⰋ Ⰰ ⰕⰑ·ⰖⰝⰋⰐⰋ·ⰐⰅⰃⰑⰂⰀ ⰃⰑⰔⰒⰀ ⰮⰀⰓ ⰃⰀⰓⰋⰕⰀ·ⰋⰐⰅⰃⰑⰂⰬ ⰔⰋⰐⰑⰂⰀⰜ ⰞⰋⰮⰖⰐ	Gravestone of Matijaš Čubranić. Ligatures: ⰃⰓ.		
1518	Barban (sv. Jakova, sjeverni zid)	ⱂ𞀑ⱂ ⰰⱀⰴⱃⰻ ⰽⱃⰲⰻⱃⰰⰾⰻⱋ ⱀⰰⰾⰵⱅ ⰳ𞀑ⱂ𞀑ⱈ ⱍ ⱇ ⰷ ⰹ	Engraver: priest Andrij Krviralić. Ligatures: ⰒⰑ, ⰃⰑ.		
1518	Karojba	·Ⱇ·ⰇⰉ· ⰍⰀⰄⰀ·Ⱑ·ⰗⰓⰀ......ⰀⰎⰍ··ⰖⰝⰍⰑⰘ· MDX...	On a stone beam in the wall of a house in the old part of Karojba currently owned by a lady from Ljubljana. It is thought to come from the Pauline monastery on the hill Sv. Spas that operated until 1792, which had been a Benedictine monastery before that. The house it is now in was earlier owned by Emanuel Valentić, who owned land on Sv. Spas. Ligatures: ⰍⰑ.	(Note: Labinjanin)	
1519	Contovello (Madonna della Salvia)	Ⱍ Ⱇ ⰈⰉ ⰕⰑ ⰒⰋⰔⰀ ⰒⰑⰒ Ⰻ ⰋⰂⰀⰐ ⰁⰅⰓⰍⰋⰐⰋⰛ Ⰸ??	Engraver: pop Ivan Berkinić. Ligatures: ⰈⰉ, ⰕⰑ, ⰒⰑ, ⰀⰐ, ⰓⰍ.		
1519	Olib (sv. Stošije)	ⰒⰑⰒ·ⰣⰓⰀⰋ·ⰜⰅⰕⰋⰐⰀⰐⰋⰐ· ⰒⰀⰓⰑⰍⰋⰡⰐ·ⰑⰎⰋⰁⰔⰍⰋ🙘 ·Ⱍ·Ⱇ·Ⰸ·Ⰹ·	Until just before 1884 it was inside of the church, but during its renovation it was removed and now it is built into the wall of the mortuary.		
1510s	Brseč (sv. Jurja)	[Ⰹ?] ⰍⰀⰄⰀ ⰔⰅ ⰔⰂⰓⰞⰋ ⰕⰀ ⰔⰀⰍⰓⰞⰕⰋⰡ			
1500s (beginning)	Novi Vinodolski (sv. Fabijana i Sebastijana)	ⰕⰖ ⰞⰓⰋⰐⰋⰜⰖ ⰖⰝ ⰋⰐⰋ ⰒⰑⰒⰬ ⰗⰋⰎⰋⰒⰬ ⰍⰋ ⰁⰋⰞⰅ ⰒⰓⰑⰍⰑⰓ ⰀⰕⰖⰓⰬ ⰑⰂⰑⰃⰀ ⰑⰎⰕⰀⰓⰀ	Chest of Novi. Contemporary with the 1511 inscription in the same church, and with the construction of the church itself. Engraver: pop Filip. Discovered at the altar of the Crkvica sv. Fabijana i Sebastijana according to parish priest M. Cvetko, then kept at the parish office, where Milčetić noticed it in 1910. The dating "1511" originally proposed by Milčetić who had discovered the inscription in 1910, with some objection by Strohal but his has not been accepted and the two were in a feud. Fučić dates it to the early 16th century. Now kept at Hrvatski povijesni muzej in Zagreb (as 6864).	(Note: HPM (1999))	

== 1520–1539 ==
Date	Place	Transcription	Name and Notes	Images	Sources
1520 (? 27)	Kanfanar (sv. Agate)	ⰝⰗⰋ ⰋⰆ ⰕⰑⰒⰋⰔⰀ ⰕⰑⰮⰀⰔ ⰆⰀⰍⰀⰐ ⰈⰐⰑⰂⰀⰍⰋ	One of the newly discovered graffitos. Ligatures: ⰕⰑ.		
1520	Hrastovlje (sv. Trojstva)	Ⱍ Ⱇ Ⰻ Ⱅ ⰮⰋ... Ⱞ...Ⰽ... ⰒⰋⰔⰀⰘ ⰌⰀ ⰒⰓⰅ ⰋⰂⰀⰐ ⰂⰋⰔⰋⰐⰕⰋⰐ ⰓⰑⰄⰑⰮ ⰈⰎⰁⰐⰀ	Engraver: priest Ivan Visintin of Labin.		
1520	Novi Vinodolski (sv. Filipa i Jakova)	·I·S·XX· ·Ⱍ·Ⱇ·Ⰻ			
1520	Rudenice by Drivenik		On a cistern. Now lost.		
1521–11–25	Draguć (sv. Elizeja)	Ⱍ Ⱇ Ⰻ Ⰰ ⰕⰖ ⰁⰋ ⰒⰑⰒ ⰋⰂⰅ ⰘⰀ...Ⱞ... ⰐⰀ ⰔⰕⰅ ⰍⰀⰕⰀⰓⰋⰐⰅ ⰄⰀⰐⰬ	On the triumphal arch. Ligatures: ⰕⰖ, ⰒⰑ. Dated the day of Saint Catherine		
1521	Barban (sv. Jakova, sjeverni zid)	ⱍ ⱇ ⰻ ⰰ ⱂ𞀑ⱂ ⰻⰲⰰⱀ ⱄⰰⰱⰾⰰ ⰸⰾⰻⱀⰴⰰⱃⰰ ⰽⰰⰴⰰ ⰱⰵⱈ...	Engraver: priest Ivan Sablja of Lindar. Ligatures: ⰒⰑ, ⰈⰎ, ⰕⰑ.		
1521 (? 2)	Hum (sv. Jeronima na groblju)	Ⱍ Ⱇ Ⰻ Ⰰ ⰄⰀⰐ ⰄⰓⰖⰃⰋ	Ligatures: ⰄⰓ.		
1522, 1599-01	Barban (sv. Antuna, južni zid)	Ⱍ Ⱇ Ⰻ Ⰱ Ⱍ Ⱇ Ⱂ Ⰸ ⰮⰋⰔⰅⰜⰀ ⰅⰐⰂⰀⰓⰀ Ⱅ𞀑 ⰒⰋⰔⰀ Ⱂ𞀑Ⱂ Ⰸ......Ⰳ Ⱅ𞀑 ⰁⰡ ⰒⰋⰔⰀⰐ𞀑	Engraver: unknown, priest "Z...". Ligatures for ⰕⰑ, ⰒⰑ, ⰐⰑ.		
1522	Beram (sv. Marije na Škrilinah, sjeverni zid)	Ⱍ Ⱇ Ⰻ Ⰱ ⰕⰖ ⰁⰡ ⰒⰬⰒⰬ ⰒⰅⰕⰓ ⰒⰅⰕⰓⰝⰋⰐⰋⰛ ⰒⰎⰑⰂⰀⰐ ⰒⰀⰄⰑⰂⰅ	Engraver: Petar Petrčinić parish priest in Padova (today Kašćerga, not to be confused with Padua). Ligatures: ⰕⰖ, ⰍⰓ, ⰒⰎⰑ, ⰄⰑ.		
1522	Glavotok (samostan sv. Marije)	Ⱍ·Ⱇ·Ⰻ·Ⰱ· ⰕⰑⰒⰋⰔⰀ ⰗⰓⰀ ⰁⰓⰐⰅ ⰁⰀⰋⰝⰋⰛ ⰒⰑⰝⰕⰑⰂⰀⰐⰋ [ⰑⰝⰅ] ⰮⰋⰐⰋⰔⰕⰓⰅ ⰐⰅⰃⰀ ⰖⰄⰓⰋⰕⰅ ⰕⰋⰘ ⰕⰓⰋⰔⰕⰀ ⰍⰓⰀ ⰕⰋ ⰮⰑⰎⰋⰮⰑ ⰂⰀ ⰞⰖ ⰮⰋⰎⰑⰔⰕ	Glavotok graffito (1522). Engravers: fra Brne Bajčić and a young monk who added to the original. Ligatures: ⰕⰑ, ⰁⰓ, ⰒⰑ, ⰕⰓ, ⰮⰑ, ⰎⰑ.		
1522	Lovran (sv. Jurja)	Ⱑ ⰎⰖⰍⰀ ⰒⰋⰔⰀⰘ ⰕⰑ ⰐⰀ ⰄⰀⰐⰬ ⰔⰂⰅⰕⰅ ⰮⰀⰓⰋⰅ ⰑⰔⰀⰎ Ⱍ Ⱇ Ⰻ Ⰱ	Engravers: Luka, but the second line from a different hand. Ligatures: ⰕⰑ, ⰀⰄⰀ, ⰮⰀ.	(Note: [low res.])	
1522	Lovran (sv. Jurja)	Ⱍ Ⱇ Ⰻ Ⰱ ⰃⰑⰄ ⰆⰖ ⰒⰐⰀ ⰗⰓⰀⰐⰖⰎⰀ ⰮⰓⰀⰂⰋⰛ	Ligatures: GO, ⰐⰖ, ⰮⰓ.		
1522	Rakotule (sv. Nikole na groblju)	ⰕⰑⰒⰋⰔⰀ ⰒⰑⰒ ⰮⰀⰓⰕⰋⰐⰬ ⰒⰓⰋⰁⰋⰎⰑⰂⰋⰛⰬ Ⱍ Ⱇ Ⰻ Ⰱ ⰑⰄ ⰔⰕⰀⰓⰋⰃⰓⰄⰀ	Engraver: priest Martin Pribilović of Starigrad. Ligatures: ⰕⰑ, ⰒⰑ, ⰒⰓ, ⰕⰀ, ⰃⰓ, ⰔⰀ, ⰄⰀ.		
1522	Senj (ulica I. Hreljanovića)	M·CCCCXXII·ZORZI·BLAGAICH· ·Ⱍ·Ⱇ·Ⰻ·Ⰱ·ⰣⰓⰀⰌ ⰁⰎⰀⰃⰀⰋⰛⰬ	Engraver: Juraj Blagajić. Found in the old, now demolished, Gradišer house, whose construction it commemorates. The house was already in ruins when it was hit by a bomb in 1943, breaking it in two. It was transferred to the Gradski muzej in 1963. Ligatures: ⰣⰓ.		
1523 (July 15/4)	Ćokovac by Pašman (sv. Kuzme i Damjana	ⰎⰕ ⰁⰋⰘ ·Ⱍ·Ⱇ·Ⰻ·Ⰲ^{ⰄⰉ}ⰮⰜⰀ ⰋⰣⰎⰅⰡ ⰐⰀⰄⰐⰬ Ⰳ... Ⱑ ⰒⰓⰋⰖⰓ Ⱄ ⰃⰑ ⰍⰖⰈ?ⰐⰐ? Ⱑ ⰐⰀ ⰗⰀⰎⰍⰖⰐⰋⰛ ⰋⰂⰐ	The number 15 could be either a correction of the date from "4" in the main text or the cardinal number of the stone. Engraver: prior Ivan Falkunić. Ligatures: ⰎⰕ, ⰁⰆ, ⰀⰄ, ⰒⰓ, ⰃⰑ. After WWII, before the renewal of the monastery, a vandal broke the stone into 9 pieces, which father Benedikt Celegin later glued back together.	(Note: , CH (2008), CH (2008), CH (2008))	
1523–10–20	Beram (sv. Marije na Škrilinah, južni zid)	Ⱍ Ⱇ Ⰻ Ⰲ ⰮⰋⰔⰅⰜⰀ ⰖⰕⰅⰁⰓⰀ ⰄⰐ Ⰻ ⰍⰀⰄⰀ ⰒⰓⰄⰘ Ⱑ ⰆⰀⰍⰀⰐ ⰮⰀⰓⰍⰑ? ⰍⰓⰋⰆⰀⰐⰋⰛ ⰈⰄⰂⰑⰓⰀ ⰒⰓⰋⰐⰜⰋⰒ Ⱄ?Ⱅ? Ⰱ ⰔⰐⰀⰮⰋ ⰀⰮⰅⰐ	Engraver: Marko Križanić. Ligatures: ⰁⰓ, ⰒⰓ, ⰄⰑ, ⰍⰓ, ⰈⰄⰂⰑ, ⰜⰀ, ⰍⰀ, ⰆⰀ, ⰓⰀ, ⰐⰀ.		
1523	Beram (sv. Marije na Škrilinah, južni zid)	Ⱍ Ⱇ Ⰻ Ⰲ ⰕⰖ ⰁⰡ ⰆⰀⰍⰀⰐ ⰮⰋⰘⰅⰎ ⰮⰀⰓⰍⰖⰝⰋⰛ ⰈⰁⰅⰓⰮⰀ ⰁⰑⰃ ⰔⰐⰀⰮⰋ	Engraver: deacon Mihel Markučić of Beram. Ligatures: ⰕⰖ, ⰁⰑ.		
1523	Beram (sv. Marije na Škrilinah, južni zid)	Ⰰ ⰔⰋⰅ ⰒⰋⰔⰀ ⰆⰀⰍⰀⰐ ⰃⰓⰃⰖⰓ ⰕⰋⰘⰑⰐⰋⰛ ⰈⰁⰅⰓⰮⰀ ⰁⰖⰄⰖⰛⰋ ⰖⰓⰅⰄⰖ ⰂⰀⰐⰌⰎⰔ ⰍⰑⰮ ⰁⰑⰃⰬ ⰔⰐⰀⰮⰋ ⰀⰮⰅⰐ ⰮⰋⰎⰆⰋⰮ ⰎⰅⰕ ⰁⰑⰆⰋⰘ Ⱍ Ⱇ Ⰻ Ⰲ Ⰳ	Engraver: deacon Grgur Tihonić. Ligatures: ⰃⰓ, ⰘⰑ, ⰁⰖ, ⰌⰎ, ⰁⰑ, ⰎⰆ. The initial Ⰰ and final Ⰳ form the monogram of deacon Grgur. The "ⰓⰅⰄ ⰂⰀⰐⰌⰎⰔⰍⰋ" refers to the deaconate.		
1523	Beram (sv. Marije na Škrilinah, južni zid)	ⰕⰑ ⰒⰋⰔⰀ ⰆⰀⰍⰀⰐ ⰑⰂⰑ ⰒⰋⰔⰀ ⰆⰀⰍⰀⰐ ⰎⰑⰂⰓⰅ ⰒⰋⰔⰀ ⰆⰀⰍⰀⰐ ⰃⰓⰞⰍⰑ ⰕⰋⰘⰑⰐⰋⰛ ⰈⰁⰅⰓⰮⰀ ⰍⰄ ⰁⰋ? ⰂⰓⰄⰖ ⰌⰂⰀⰐⰌⰎⰔⰍⰑⰮ Ⱍ Ⱇ Ⰻ Ⰲ	Engravers: deacon Lovre, deacon Grško Tihonić of Beram. Ligatures: ⰕⰑ, ⰂⰑ, ⰂⰓ, ⰃⰓ, ⰘⰑ.		
1523	Bale (sv. Antuna, sjeverni zid lađe)	ⱍ̄ ⱇ̄ ⰻ̄ ⰲ̄ ⱅ𞀑ⱂⰻⱄⰰ ⱂ𞀑ⱂⱜ ⱞⰰⱅⰻⱑⰸ𞀑ⱅ𞀑ⰽⰰ ⰽⱃⱍⰽ𞀑ⰳⰰ ⱄⰻⱀ ⰰⱀⱅ𞀑ⱀⰰ ⱂ𞀑ⰽ𞀓ⰰⰻⱍⰻⱋⰰ	Below the and to the right of the inscription by Jakov Vitković. Ligatures for ⰕⰑ, ⰐⰑ, ⰈⰑ, ⰍⰑ, ⰐⰀ. Engraver: Matija Antonov Pokrajčić.		
1524–03–12	Beram (sv. Marije na Škrilinah, južni zid)	Ⱍ Ⱇ Ⰻ Ⰳ ⰄⰀⰐ ⰔⰕⰃⰀ ⰃⰓⰀ ⰜⰅⰒⰋⰘ Ⱑ ⰆⰀⰍⰀⰐ ⰕⰄⰀⰓ ⰍⰓⰆⰀⰐⰋⰛ ... ⰮⰀⰓⰋⰡ	Engraver: deacon Tudar Križanić. Ligatures: ⰍⰓ, ⰆⰀ, ⰍⰀⰐ, ⰄⰀ. Dated the day of Saint Gregory.		
1524	Beram (sv. Marije na Škrilinah, južni zid)	ⰔⰋⰅ ⰒⰋⰔⰀ ⰆⰀⰍⰀⰐ ⰕⰖⰄⰀⰓ ⰍⰓⰋⰆⰀⰐⰋⰛ ⰈⰁⰅⰓⰮⰀ ⰁⰖⰄⰖⰛ ⰂⰓⰅⰄⰖ ⰌⰅⰂⰀⰐⰌⰅⰎⰔⰍⰑⰮ Ⱍ Ⱇ Ⰻ Ⰳ ⰑⰔⰀⰎ	Engravers: deacon Tudar Križanić, with the insult "ⰑⰔⰀⰎ" added by a second hand. Ligatures: ⰕⰖ, ⰍⰓⰋⰆ, ⰁⰖ, ⰂⰓ, ⰄⰖ, ⰍⰑ, ⰔⰀ, ⰍⰀ, ⰄⰀ, ⰂⰀ.		
1524	Beram (sv. Marije na Škrilinah, južni zid)	ⰔⰋⰅ ⰒⰋⰔⰀ ⰆⰀⰐⰬ ⰃⰓⰞⰍ ⰕⰋⰘⰑⰐⰋⰛ ⰈⰁⰅⰓⰮⰀ	Engraver: Grško Tihonić. Uses ligature ⰃⰓ. The date is written in Arabic numerals. Below this inscription there are several severely damaged inscriptions, in which the name Grško Tihonić can be read. No reproduction in Fučić 1982 of the 1524 inscription or what lies beneath it.		
1524	Bribir (sv. Petra i Pavla)	Ⱍ·Ⱇ·Ⰻ·Ⰳ· ⰂⰀ ⰂⰓⰋⰮ Ⰵ ⰈⰮⰑⰆⰐⰑⰃⰀ ⰃⰄ ⰐⰀ ⰍⰐⰅⰈⰀ ⰁⰓⰐⰀⰓⰄ ⰋⰐⰀ ⰁⰋ ⰕⰑ ⰖⰝ Ⰻ ⰂⰀ ⰕⰑ ⰁⰋⰞⰅ Ⱓ ⰓⰍⰑ ⰒⰒ Ⰻ ...Ⱀ...ⰁⰅ...	Bribir inscription (1524). Survives only in transcription by Mijat Sabljar.		
1524	Butoniga (sv. Križa)	Ⱍ Ⱇ Ⰻ Ⰳ ⰍⰀⰄⰀ ⰕⰑ ......	On the north wall.		
1524	Grobnik (sv. Filipa i Jakova)	Ⱍ Ⱇ Ⰻ Ⰳ	On a lintel.		
1524	Plomin (sv. Jurja "starog")	1524 Ⱍ Ⱇ Ⰻ Ⰳ	Commemorates the construction of the presbytery.		
1525–11–13	Šorići (sv. Marije Magdalene)	Ⰰ ⰕⰑ ⰈⰀⰒⰋⰔⰀ ⰣⰓⰋⰐ ⰈⰀⰓⰍⰑⰂⰋⰛ ⰂⰀ ⰐⰑ ⰂⰓⰋⰮⰅ ⰍⰀⰄⰀ ⰕⰅⰝⰀⰞⰅ Ⱍ Ⱇ Ⰻ Ⰴ ⰮⰋⰔⰅⰜⰀ ⰐⰑⰂⰅⰁⰓⰀ ⰄⰐ ⰉⰂ Ⱆ ⰔⰂⰅⰕⰑⰋ ⰮⰀⰓⰋⰌⰋ ⰮⰀⰃⰄⰀⰎⰅⰐⰋ ⰀⰮⰅⰐ	Engraver: Jurin Zarković. Ligatures: ⰕⰑ, ⰐⰑ, ⰁⰓ, ⰄⰀ, ⰁⰀ.		
1525	Dvigrad (sv. Marije od Lokvića)	ⰕⰑ ⰒⰋⰔⰀ ⰒⰑⰒⰬ ⰮⰋⰘⰅⰎ ⰈⰁⰅⰓⰮⰀ ⰍⰀⰄⰀ ⰁⰡⰘ ⰒⰓⰋⰞⰀⰎ ⰑⰂⰄⰡ ⰁⰑⰃ ⰔⰐⰮⰋ ⰀⰮⰅⰐ Ⱍ Ⱇ Ⰻ Ⰴ	Engraver: priest Mihel of Beram. Ligatures: ⰕⰑ, ⰒⰑ, ⰒⰓ, ⰂⰄ, ⰞⰀⰎ.		
1525	Komrčar on Rab (sv. Franje na groblju)	Ⱍ Ⱇ Ⰻ Ⰴ	On the grave stone of fra Matija Bošnjak.		
1525	Lovran (sv. Jurja)	Ⱍ Ⱇ Ⰻ Ⰴ ⰒⰓⰅ ⰗⰋⰎⰋⰒ ⰄⰑⰐⰀⰄⰑⰂⰋⰛ ⰂⰋⰍ··ⰂⰀ ⰐⰅⰛⰖ	Engraver: pre Filip Donadović. Ligatures: ⰒⰓ, ⰄⰑ.		
1525	Omišalj (Uznesenja BDM)	Ⱍ·Ⱇ·Ⰻ·Ⰴ· ⰕⰑ Ⰵ ⰍⰀ ⰒⰅⰎⰀ ⰍⰖ ⰝⰋⰐⰋ ⰖⰝⰋⰐⰋⰕ ⰒⰑⰒ Ⱞ ⰀⰕⰋⰋ ⰂⰎⰝⰋⰌⰋⰛ ⰒⰎⰑⰂⰐ ⰑⰮⰋⰞⰎⰔⰍⰋ	Ligatures: ⰕⰑ, ⰂⰎ, ⰒⰎ, ⰍⰀ. Engraver: parish priest Matij Vlčijić.		
1526 (April 13)	Gradinje (Svih Svetih)	Ⱍ̃ Ⱇ̃ Ⰻ̃ Ⰵ̃· ⰀⰒⰓⰋⰎⰀ ⰄⰀⰐ — ⰂⰉ ??Ⰰ ⰎⰅ??Ⰵ ⰔⰕⰋ ??Ⱁ̃ ⰋⰒⰓ... ??Ⱀ ... ⰂⰀⰈⰮⰅ ⰕⰑ ⰒⰋⰔⰀ ⰒⰑⰒ ⰮⰀⰓⰕⰋⰐ ⰀⰮⰁⰓⰑⰆ?...	Engraver: priest Martin Ambrožić. Ligatures: ⰀⰒⰓ, ⰕⰋ, ⰒⰓ, ⰕⰑ, ⰁⰓ.	(Note: Bistrović [low res.])	
1526	Bakar	Ⱍ Ⱇ Ⰻ Ⰵ	Discovered in the ruins of a house on Fortica below the parish church, by house number 218. The house was already in ruins by about 1890. Mažić read it as 1509 but it was actually 1526. The date corresponds to the construction of a hospice there and matches the date in Latinic and with Arabic numerals on the first floor of the house "LETTA 152[6]".		
1526	Beram (sv. Marije na Škrilinah, južni zid)	Ⱍ Ⱇ Ⰻ Ⰵ			
1526	Kanfanar (sv. Agate)	Ⱍ Ⱇ Ⰻ Ⰵ ⰕⰑⰒⰋⰔⰀ ⰁⰎⰀⰆ ⰆⰀⰍⰀⰐ ⰈⰁⰓⰋⰁⰋⰓⰀ	One of the newly discovered graffitos. Engraver: deacon Blaž of Bribir. Ligatures: ⰕⰑ, ⰁⰓ.	(Note: CH [low res.])	
1526	Podskoči (sv. Martina)	Ⱍ·Ⱇ·Ⰻ·Ⰵ Ⱎ Ⰱ Ⱞ ⰍⰀⰞⰕⰀⰎⰄ ⰂⰀⰎⰍⰑ ⰮⰅⰞⰕⰀⰓ ⰕⰑⰮⰀⰞ	Engraver: meštar Tomaš.		
1527-05	Vrbnik (Uznesenja BDM)	Ⱍ Ⱇ Ⰻ Ⰶ ⰮⰋⰔⰅⰜⰀ [ⰮⰀⰡ] ⰕⰑ ⰔⰖ ⰮⰅ[Ⱎ]Ⱅ[Ⱃ]Ⰻ ⰍⰋ ⰈⰋⰄⰀⰞⰅ ⰕⰀ ⰈⰂ[ⰑⰐ]ⰋⰍ ⰮⰅⰞ ⰕⰀⰓ ⰁⰎⰀⰆ ⰐⰅⰓⰀⰕ Ⰻ ⰮⰅⰞⰕ ⰀⰓ ⰕⰑⰮⰀⰞ Ⰸ ⰁⰓⰋⰁⰋⰓ[Ⰰ] Ⰰ Ⰲ Ⰰ ⰕⰑ ⰂⰓⰋⰮⰅ ⰁⰋⰞⰅ ⰍⰀⰞⰕ ⰀⰎ ⰕⰑⰮⰀⰞ ⰂⰋⰕⰅⰈⰋⰛ	Vrbnik inscription (1527). Engraver: master Blaž Nerat or master Tomaš of Bribir. Ligatures: ⰁⰓ.		
1527	Bihać (džamija Fehtija)	[Ⱍ] Ⱇ Ⰻ Ⰶ	An inscription inside the Fehtija mosque, made when it was still the Dominican monastery's church, dedicated to Saint Anthony. As of 1982, an investigation into whether there were other inscriptions beneath the paint had not been carried out.		
1527	Bribir (fortress)	Ⰲ ⰋⰮⰅ ⰁⰆⰋⰅ ⰀⰮⰅⰐⰬ ⰎⰕⰬ ⰃⰄⰐⰘ ·Ⱍ·Ⱇ·Ⰻ·Ⰶ· ⰂⰀ ⰂⰓⰋⰮⰅ ⰂⰈ ⰮⰑⰆⰐⰃⰀ ⰃⰄⰐⰀ ⰍⰐⰅⰈⰀ ⰁⰓⰐⰀⰓ ⰄⰋⰐⰀ Ⱇ Ⰽ Ⱄ Ⱞ Ⰻ ⰒⰓⰝⰀⰡ ⰂⰀ ⰕⰑ ⰂⰓⰋⰮⰅ ⰁⰋⰞⰅ ⰍⰒⰋⰕⰀⰐⰬ Ⰲ ⰁⰓⰋⰁⰓⰋ ⰎⰑⰂⰓⰅⰐⰜ ⰁⰛⰀⰜⰬ Ⰻ ⰒⰓⰑⰝⰀⰡ	Bribir inscription (1527). Once part of the wall of the tower of the Bribir fortress, whose construction or renovation under captain Lovrenac it commemorated. It was first reproduced by Vincenzo Joppi on 2 October 1865, when it was still in the main tower of the Bribir castle, only to be deposited into the Depoli collection in what used to be the Jadranski institut in Rijeka. The original structure was destroyed in 1911, but the stone with the inscription was given to the Arheološki muzej in Zagreb. The inscription is now kept at Hrvatski povijesni muzej in Zagreb (as 6812). Ligatures: ⰁⰆ, ⰎⰕ, ⰃⰄ, ⰃⰄⰐ, ⰂⰓ, ⰮⰑ, ⰒⰓ, ⰕⰑ, ⰁⰓ, ⰈⰀ, ⰕⰀ.		
1527	Žminj (sv. Trojstva)	Ⱍ Ⱇ Ⰻ Ⰶ			
1528	Ozalj (Žitnica)	Ⱍ Ⱇ Ⰻ Ⰷ	In a residential house of the Zrinski family in the old city known as Žitnica.		
1538	Vrbnik (Uznesenja BDM)	ⰈⰀ ?ⰄⰖ ⰞⰖ ⰔⰕⰀ ⰮⰀⰓⰋ Ⱑ Ⱍ·Ⱇ·Ⰼ· Ⰷ·Ⰻ ⰒⰓⰝⰡ	Ligatures: ⰒⰓ.		
1529–09–15	Hum	Ⰲ ⰘⰑ ⰋⰮⰅ ⰀⰮⰅⰐ · ⰎⰅⰕ ⰓⰑⰋⰔⰕⰂⰀ ⰕⰑⰃⰑⰅ ·Ⱍ·Ⱇ·Ⰻ·Ⰸ ⰮⰋⰔⰅⰜⰀ ⰔⰅⰍⰕⰅⰁⰓⰀ ⰄⰀⰐ ·Ⰻ· ⰁⰋ ⰔⰂⰓⰞⰅⰐⰀ ⰕⰀ ⰗⰋⰃⰖⰓⰀ Ⰲ ⰘⰖⰮⰋ ⰐⰀ ⰔⰎⰀⰂⰖ ⰃⰄⰐⰖ ⰁⰖ Ⰻ ⰔⰕⰑⰮⰖ ⰅⰓⰑⰎⰋⰮⰖ ⰒⰑ ⰮⰅⰞⰕⰓⰋ ⰀⰐⰕⰑⰐⰋ ⰄⰑⰂⰅ ⰁⰋⰞⰅ Ⰲ ⰘⰖⰮⰋ ⰒⰎⰑⰂⰀⰐ ⰃⰄⰋⰐ ⰋⰎⰋⰡ ⰒⰅⰛⰀⰓⰋⰛ ⰓⰑⰄⰑⰮ ⰋⰈ ⰁⰓⰋⰁⰋⰓⰀ Ⰻ Ⰲ ⰕⰑ ⰎⰅⰕⰑ ⰒⰑⰍⰓⰋⰞⰅ ⰜⰓⰋⰍⰀⰂ ⰔⰂ ⰅⰓⰑⰎⰋⰮⰀ ⰗⰋⰃⰖⰓⰖ ⰐⰀ ⰐⰕⰀⰓ ⰔⰕⰑⰃⰀ ⰀⰐⰕⰑⰐⰀ ...ⰖⰐⰄⰖ Ⰻ ⰮⰀⰎⰋ ⰈⰂⰑⰐ ⰒⰑⰔⰕⰀⰂⰋⰞⰅ Ⰻ ⰂⰅⰛⰅ ⰄⰑⰁⰓⰀ ⰔⰕⰂⰑⰓⰋⰞⰅ ⰈⰀⰝ ⰁⰋⰘⰖ Ⰲ ⰘⰖⰮⰋ ⰄⰑⰁⰓⰋ ⰣⰓⰀⰋ ⰃⰓⰋⰆⰋⰐⰋⰛ Ⰻ ⰐⰅⰃⰀ ⰒⰑⰄⰆⰖⰒ ⰃⰓⰃⰖⰓ ⰁⰀⰍⰞⰋⰛ Ⰻ ⰑⰔⰕⰎⰋ ⰄⰑⰁⰓⰋ ⰮⰖⰆⰋ Ⰻ ⰕⰑ ⰂⰓⰋⰮⰅ ⰜⰀⰓ ⰔⰅⰎⰋⰮⰁⰅⰃ ⰈⰀⰖⰡ ⰖⰃⰓⰔⰍⰖ ⰈⰅⰮⰎⰣ Ⰻ ⰁⰋⰞⰅ ⰒⰑ ⰂⰔⰅⰮ ⰔⰂⰋⰕⰖ ⰓⰀⰕ ⰐⰅⰂⰅⰓⰀ ⰐⰅⰎⰣⰁⰀⰂ ⰘⰋⰐⰁⰀ ⰖⰆⰖⰓⰀ Ⰻ ⰕⰑ ⰈⰀⰒⰋⰔⰀⰘⰬ Ⱑ ⰒⰑⰒ ⰀⰐⰄⰓⰋⰋⰋ ⰒⰓⰀⰞⰋⰛ ⰓⰑⰄⰑⰮ ⰋⰈ ⰁⰖⰆⰀⰐ	Hum triptych (Zapis na humskom triptihu). Engraver: master Anton.	(Note: ,)	
1529	Draguć (sv. Elizeja)	Ⱍ·Ⱇ·Ⰻ·Ⰸ ⰁⰖⰄⰖⰛⰋ ⰗⰀⰓⰮⰀⰐ ⰂⰄⰓⰀⰃⰖⰛⰋ	On the north wall. Engraver: parish priest Andrij Prašić (born in Bužan). Ligatures: ⰂⰄ, ⰃⰖ.		
1530–03–21	Barban (sv. Antuna, južni zid)	ⱍ·ⱇ·ⰼ· ⱀⰰ ⰴⰰⱀ ⱄⱅ𞀑ⰳⰰ ⰱⱀⰵⰴⰻⰽⱅⰰ ⰽⰰⰴⰰ ...	Ligature for ⰕⰑ. Dated the day of Saint Benedict.		
1530–05–23	Kastav (sv. Sebastijana)	Ⱍ Ⱇ Ⰼ ⰮⰀⰡ ⰋⰂ	Destroyed on 10 June 1865 and reused to build the doors of the renovated church. A reproduction by Volčić survives.		
1530	Bakar (Kaštel)	·Ⱍ·Ⱇ·Ⰼ· ⰴⰀⱍⰋⱀⰋ· ⰖⱍⰋⱀⰋⰕⰋ· ⰑⰂⰖ · ⰱⰀⰞⰕⰋⰣ · ⰳⰴⰋⱀ · ⰅⰓⰑⰎⰋM ·ⰴⰅⰈⰀⰓⰀ · ⰱⰖⰴⰖⰛⰋ·Ⱁⱀ·ⰕⰀⰴⰀ· ⰽⰀⰒⰋⰕⰀⱀ · ⱀⰀⰴⰀⰓMⰀⰴⰖ ⰽⰓⰀⰎⰂⰅ· Ⱄ̅ⰕⰎⰑⰔⰕⰋ· ⱀⰀ[·ⰴ]ⰖⱀⰀⰋ· ⰋⰽⰀⰒⰋⰕⰀⱀ·ⰱⰀⰽⰀⰓⰔⰽⰋ· ⰋⰜⰅⰕⰓⰀ ⰀⰆⰀⱀ· ⱑⰽ𞀑M𞀑· ⰴⰅⰒⰀⱀⰋ· ⰱⰋⰞⰅ· [ⰂⰋ]ⰜⰅ · ⰽⰀⰒⰋⰕⰀⱀ· ⰱⰀⰽⰀⰓⰔⰽⰋ· ⰋⰂⰋⱀ𞀑ⰴ𞀑ⰎⰔⰍⰋ	On the wall behind the main entrance to the castle of Bakar. Ligatures for ⰃⰄ, ⰕⰎ, ⰍⰑ, ⰮⰑ, ⰐⰑ, ⰄⰑ.		
1530	Contovello (Madonna della Salvia)		Low resolution image in Mader 2007. Other 16th century Glagolitic letters can be seen to the left of the inscription (including ⰝⰗ...).		
1530-09	Contovello (Madonna della Salvia)	ⰌⰗ ⰓⰐⰀ ⰓⰑⰄⰑⰮⰬ ⰁⰓⰀⰐⰋⰐⰬ ⰒⰋⰅ̀ⰮⰖ	Engraver: rodom Braninъ.		
1530	Omišalj (sv. Jurja na Jezeru)	Ⱍ Ⱇ Ⰼ	Brought to the Omišalj lapidarium in 1957.		
1530	Paz (sv. Vida)	Ⱍ Ⱇ Ⰼ			
1530	Silba (sv. Marka)	S·DE·MCO·BILUSIC·DI·SCH; RDA·ET·SVI·EREDI·M· D·XXX ⰮⰀⰓⰍⰑ ⰁⰋⰎⰖⰞ [ⰒⰑⰍⰑⰋ] ⰂⰋⰝⰐⰋ ⰄⰀ ⰋⰮ ⰃⰑⰔ ⰒⰑⰄⰋ [Ⰻ ⰔⰂⰋⰕⰎⰑⰔⰕ Ⰲ] ⰋⰛ[ⰐⰀ ⰔⰂⰋⰕⰎⰋⰎⰀ ⰋⰮ]	Gravestone of Marko Bilušić. Very worn. In 1637, the old church by that name was demolished and the present one built, incorporating this gravestone. Ligatures: ⰃⰑ.		
1531–02–14	Materada (sv. Marije od Snijega)	Ⱍ Ⱇ Ⰼ Ⰰ ⰒⰓⰂⰀⰓⰀ Ⰳ Ⰻ ⰒⰑⰒ·ⰋⰂⰀⰐ·Ⱎ ⰕⰖⰓⰝⰋⰛ Ⰵ Ⰵ ??Ⰻ·Ⰽ	Inscription on the gravestone of parish priest Stručić. Ligatures: ⰂⰀ. Originally in the floor of the sanctuary before the altar, but in 1953 it was moved to the wall behind the altar, in the sacristy.		
1531	Ćokovac by Pašman (sv. Kuzme i Damjana)	·Ⱍ·Ⱇ·Ⰼ·Ⰰ·ⰕⰑⰕⰖ ⰎⰡⰆ Ⰻ ⰄⰑⰮⰀⰐⰕⰑⰐⰬ ⰁⰑⰃⰄ ⰀⰐⰋⰛⰬ ⰒⰓⰋⰖⰓⰬ ⰔⰕⰑⰃ Ⰰ ⰍⰖⰈⰮⰋ·ⰋⰄⰑⰮⰡⰐⰀ Ⱄ ⰒⰀ ⰞⰮⰀⰐⰀ	Gravestone of Anton Bogdanić prior of the monastery. Ligatures: ⰃⰄ.	(Note: ^{(WM)},)	
1531	Godešič (sv. Nikole)	Ⱍ Ⱇ Ⰼ Ⰰ	On the southeastern wall of the sanctuary.		
1531	Trsat by Rijeka (Kružićeva kapela)	·Ⱍ·Ⱇ·Ⰼ·Ⰰ·			
1532	Bačva (sv. Ivana)	Ⱍ Ⱇ·Ⰼ Ⱀ ⰍⰀⰄⰀⰁⰅ ⰕⰄⰀⰞⰐСØ ⰄⰅⰎⰀ[Ⱀ]Ⰰ ▫ⰕⰀDⰀ Ⰽ BГⰎ · ⰒⰒ·ⰮⰀⰓ ⰀⰔⰀⰀV...	Natpis s nekadašnje crkve sv. Ivana. Facsimile by župnik Josip Kastelc on 22 April 1881 (Arhiv HAZU VIII 161) and another by Vjekoslav Spinčić on 1 August 1889 (on a leaf stuck inside a missalette for masses of the dead owned at one point by Opatija lawyer J. Červar) are all that survive, because in 1871 the inscription was taken from the demolished Crkva sv. Ivana and built into the cistern of the parish house, where Spinčić was the last known person to see it in 1899, after which it vanished at an unknown date.	(Note: , NSK)	
1532	Dvigrad (sv. Marije od Lokvića)	Ⱍ Ⱇ Ⰼ Ⰱ ⰕⰑⰕⰖ ⰁⰡ ⰒⰑⰒ ⰮⰋⰘⰑⰂⰋⰎ ⰈⰁⰅⰓⰮⰀ ⰁⰖⰄⰖⰛⰋ ⰂⰅⰎⰅ ⰕⰖⰆⰀⰐ ⰈⰀⰝ ⰮⰋ ⰔⰅ ⰂⰅⰎⰋⰍⰀ ⰐⰅⰒⰓⰀⰂⰄⰀ ⰝⰋⰐⰀⰞⰅ ⰂⰂⰓⰋⰮⰅ ⰑⰂⰑ ⰁⰆⰅ ⰒⰑⰮⰑⰈⰋ	Engraver: priest Mihovil of Beram. Ligatures: ⰕⰑ, ⰕⰖ, ⰘⰑ, ⰁⰖ, ⰒⰓ, ⰂⰄ, ⰂⰓ, ⰂⰑ, ⰁⰑ, ⰒⰑ.		
1532	Lindar (sv. Katarine)	Ⱍ Ⱇ Ⰼ Ⰱ ⰕⰑ ⰒⰋⰔⰀ ⰒⰑⰒ ⰃⰓⰃⰖⰓ ⰁⰅⰐⰍⰑⰂⰋⰛ ⰈⰄⰓⰋⰂⰅⰐⰋⰍⰀ ⰓⰑⰄⰑⰮ·ⰕⰑ ⰎⰅⰕⰑ ⰁⰋⰘ ⰍⰀⰒⰅⰎⰀⰐ ⰂⰎⰋⰐⰄⰓⰋ ⰐⰅ Ⰱ...Ⱄ ⰃⰓ Ⰻ ⰒⰎⰑⰂⰐⰀ ⰎⰋⰐⰄⰀⰔⰍⰑⰃⰀ ...ⰋⰎⰐⰀ	Engraver: Grgur Benković of Drivenik chaplain in Lindar. Ligatures: ⰕⰑ, ⰒⰑ, ⰃⰓ, ⰃⰖ, ⰍⰑ, ⰈⰄ, ⰄⰑ, ⰂⰎ, ⰒⰎ, ⰄⰀ, ⰃⰀ. Not before 1409.		
1533–03–14	Draguć (sv. Roka)	Ⱍ Ⱇ Ⰼ Ⰲ ⰮⰋⰔⰅⰜⰀ ⰮⰀⰓⰝⰀ ⰄⰀⰐ ⰃⰉ ⰍⰀⰄⰀ ⰒⰑⰃⰑⰓⰋ ⰁⰖⰓⰃ ⰒⰓⰅⰄ ⰄⰓⰀⰃⰖⰛⰅⰮ	On the south wall. Commemorates the day the burg of Draguć burned. Ligatures: ⰮⰀ, ⰝⰀ, ⰄⰀⰐ, ⰃⰉ, ⰄⰀ, ⰒⰑ, ⰒⰓ, ⰄⰓ.		
1533	Beram (sv. Marije na Škrilinah, južni zid)	Ⱍ·Ⱇ Ⰼ Ⰲ ⰒⰑⰄ ⰕⰅⰮ ⰮⰋⰎⰅⰈⰋⰮⰑⰮ ⰔⰅ ⰌⰀ ⰒⰑⰝⰅⰘ ⰖⰝⰋⰕⰋ ⰔⰕⰑⰃⰀ ⰒⰋⰔⰮⰀ	Ligatures: ⰒⰑ, ⰮⰑ, ⰕⰑⰃ, ⰃⰀ, ⰮⰀ.		
1533	Beram (sv. Marije na Škrilinah, južni zid)	Ⱍ Ⱇ Ⰼ Ⰲ ⰔⰋⰅ ⰒⰋⰔⰀ ⰎⰅⰂⰀⰜ ⰍⰓⰋⰆⰀⰐⰋⰛ ⰒⰋⰡⰐⰋ ⰑⰔⰀⰎ	Engraver: Levac Križanić, with "ⰒⰋⰡⰐⰋ ⰑⰔⰀⰎ" in a different hand mocking the original inscription as "drunk". Ligatures: ⰔⰀ, ⰂⰀ, ⰆⰀ.		
1533	Hum (sv. Jerolima)		Commemorates the construction of the porch.		
1533	Pićan		On the bell.		
1533	Pomjan (Male Gospe)	Ⱍ·Ⱇ·Ⰼ·Ⰲ ? ⰕⰑ ⰒⰋⰔⰀ ⰒⰑⰒ ⰮⰀⰓⰍⰑ ⰍⰓⰞⰍⰑⰂⰋⰛ ⰍⰋ ...	Engraver: pop Marko Kršković.		
1533	Sali		On the Ušalj house. Not lost, but covered by a more recent facade.		
1534–01–26	Contovello (Maria della Salvia)	Ⱍ Ⱇ Ⰼ Ⰳ ⰮⰋⰔⰅⰜⰀ ⰒⰅⰓⰂⰀⰓⰀ ⰄⰐ ⰋⰅ ⰕⰑ ⰒⰋⰔⰀⰘ ⰌⰀ ⰒⰑⰒ ⰮⰋⰘⰑⰂⰎ Ⱄ ⰜⰓⰋⰍⰂⰅⰐⰋⰜⰅ	Engraver: priest Mihovil of Crikvenica. Ligatures: ⰄⰐ, ⰕⰑ, ⰒⰑ, ⰘⰑ, ⰂⰎ, ⰜⰀ, ⰂⰀ, ⰓⰅ, ⰔⰀ, ⰌⰀ.		
1534	Beram (sv. Marije na Škrilinah, sjeverni zid)	Ⱍ·Ⱇ·Ⰻ·Ⰳ·ⰍⰀⰄⰀ ⰁⰅⰘ ⰕⰖ Ⱑ ⰆⰀⰍⰀⰐ ⰕⰖⰄⰀⰓ ⰑⰔⰀⰎ ⰎⰑⰕⰀⰓ	Engraver: deacon Tudar, Osal lotar. Two hands. Ligatures: ⰕⰖ, ⰍⰀ, ⰄⰀ, ⰆⰀ.		
1534	Beram (sv. Marije na Škrilinah, sjeverni zid)	ⰑⰕⰓⰑⰜⰋ ⰅⰂⰓⰅⰋⰔⰜⰋ ⰓⰋⰈⰋ ⰔⰂⰑⰅ ⰒⰓⰑⰔⰕⰋⰓⰀⰘⰖ ⰒⰑ ⰒⰖⰕⰋ Ⰰ ⰄⰓⰖⰈⰋ ⰎⰑⰮⰎⰀⰘⰖ ⰂⰅⰕ ⰂⰋⰅ ⰮⰀⰔⰎⰋⰐⰋ Ⱍ Ⱇ Ⰼ Ⰳ	Description of an image from the Gospel of Mark 11,8 according to the Slavonic text. Ligatures: ⰕⰓ, ⰂⰓ, ⰒⰓ, ⰒⰑ, ⰒⰖ, ⰄⰓ, ⰎⰑ, ⰎⰀ.		
1534	Kaštelir-Labinci (sv. Trojstva)	Ⱍ Ⱇ Ⰼ Ⰻ Ⰳ ⰒⰑⰒ ⰕⰑⰮⰀⰔⰬ	Engraver: priest Tomas. Ligatures: ⰒⰑ, ⰕⰑ.		
1534	Oprtalj (BDM)	ⰍⰋ ⰖⰮⰑⰝⰋⰕ ⰔⰀ ⰮⰐⰑⰣ Ⱆ ⰔⰑⰎⰋⰎⰑ ⰓⰖⰍⰖ ⰕⰀ ⰮⰅ ⰒⰓⰅⰄⰀⰔⰕ Ⱍ Ⱇ Ⰼ Ⰳ ⰆⰀⰍⰀⰐ ⰅⰍⰑⰂ ⰍⰀⰄⰀ ⰔⰕⰀⰘ ⰐⰀ ⰞⰕⰅⰓⰐⰋ	Engraver: deacon Jakov. Ligatures: ⰔⰑ, ⰐⰑ, ⰎⰑ, ⰍⰖ.		
1535–06–20	Beram (sv. Marije na Škrilinah, južni zid)	ⰑⰂⰑ ⰒⰋⰔⰀⰘ Ⱑ ⰮⰋⰍⰖⰎⰀ ⰍⰓⰋⰆⰀⰐⰋⰛ ⰮⰑⰣ ⰂⰎⰀⰛⰖ ⰓⰖⰍⰖ ⰐⰀ ·Ⱍ·Ⱇ·Ⰼ·Ⰴ· ⰮⰅⰔⰅⰜⰀ ⰋⰣⰐⰀ ⰐⰀ ⰄⰐⰋ Ⰻ	Engraver: Mikula Križanić. Ligatures: ⰂⰑ, ⰍⰖ, ⰮⰑ, ⰂⰎ, ⰛⰖ, ⰜⰀ, ⰐⰀ.		
1535	Contovello (Maria della Salvia)	Ⱍ Ⱇ Ⰼ Ⰴ ⰂⰖⰍ ⰓⰀⰔⰘⰋⰐⰋ ? Ⰽ...ⰂⰅⰜ Ⰵ ⰎⰖⰜ. ⰋⰈⰌⰋⰄⰀ			
1535	Kastav (sv. Sebastijana)	Ⱍ Ⱇ Ⰼ Ⰴ	Discovered in October 1980.		
1535	Materada	VIDO·RADICIC· ZVPA·AFATO; CONCAR·LAGI ESIA d E MATARAdA Ⱍ Ⱇ Ⰼ Ⰴ	On the stone for holy water. Originally inside the church, then in the 19th century it was rebuilt into the wall surrounding the church and graveyard. In 1953 it was moved to a position beneath the roof of the church. Engraver: župan Vid Radičić.		
1535	Punat (br. 493)	1535; IĦS Ⱂ Ⱎ Ⱓ	Engraver: pop Šime Juranić. In a house once owned by Frane Mrakovčić "Jerolimov".	(Note: ,)	
1535	Omišalj (Veli dvor 11)	ⰒⰓⰅⰮ ⰗⰓⰀ ⰝⰗ ⰌⰅ	On a former lintel secondarily built into the house once owned by Miko "Beneto" Kraljić. Engraver: Matija Franović. Ligatures: ⰒⰓ.	(Note: , VO (2024))	(Note: ˙)
1535	Sali (sv. Marije)	ⰕⰑⰅ ⰃⰓⰑⰁ ⰄⰑⰮⰀ ⰓⰕⰋⰐⰀ·ⰮⰖⰓⰃⰀⰞⰋ ⰛⰀ ⰒⰀⰓⰑⰘⰋⰡⰐⰀ ⰔⰀⰎ ⰔⰍⰑⰃⰀ·ⰎⰅⰕ·ⰃⰐⰋ Ⱈ ·Ⱍ·Ⱇ·ⰌⰄ	Natpis na nadgrobnoj ploči u crkvi sv. Marije. Originally the gravestone of parish priest don Martin Murgašić who died 1535, and was first mentioned in 1506 according to Bianchi 1879 (Zara cristiana volume II, page 81). First noted in the graveyard by Ivan Berčić during his 1866 visit. It was then brought to "Pod fafarikul" above the present school where it served as a bench. In 1878 when a public livestock pool was constructed beneath Strmac, it served as the foot of its crown. The trampling led to many of its letters becoming dull. In 1933 when the pool was renovated the stone was carried off to a nearby spot. In 1941 it was transported to the courtyard of the Crkva sv. Marije, where it became popular for children to play on, further eroding its letters. In 1959 it was repurposed as the table of the altar. In 1977 that table was demolished and the gravestone was built into the wall of the church. Ligatures: ⰃⰓ.		(Note: ˙˙˙)
1535	Sali		Once in the Cankova kuća, now lost.		
1536-05	Omišalj (sv. Mihovila)	Ⱍ Ⱇ Ⰼ Ⰲ ⰮⰔⰜⰀ ⰮⰀⰓⰝⰀ ⰒⰑ^{Ⰲ}ⰎⰋ Ⰱ ⰑⰆⰌⰋ ⰋⰁⰎⰀⰆⰐⰋⰅ ⰄⰡⰂⰋ ⰮⰀⰓⰋⰅ ⰋⰒⰑ ⰃⰖⰂⰅⰓⰐⰋ ⰃⰄⰋⰐⰀ ⰒⰎⰑⰂⰀⰐⰀ ⰮⰀⰕⰋⰅ ⰂⰎⰝⰋⰋⰛⰀ ⰋⰮⰋⰍⰖⰎⰋ ⰀⰐⰬⰕⰑⰐⰝⰋⰛⰀ ⰍⰀⰞ ⰕⰀⰎⰬⰄⰀ Ⰻ ⰔⰖⰄⰀⰜⰬ ⰍⰋ ⰁⰡⰘⰖ ⰕⰑⰃⰀ ⰂⰓ ⰋⰮⰅⰐⰀ ⰋⰒⰑⰮⰑⰓⰅ ⰃⰀ ⰝⰋⰐⰋⰕⰋ ⰂⰀⰔⰬ ⰒⰀⰎⰬⰍⰬ ⰋⰁⰓⰀⰞⰬⰛⰋⰐⰋ ⰕⰀ ⰈⰂⰑⰐⰋⰍⰬ Ⰰ ⰖⰝⰋⰐⰋⰞ Ⰵ ⰃⰀ ⰮⰅⰞⰕⰓⰋ ⰮⰅ{ⰕⰓⰬ ⰒⰡⰓⰑ ⰈⰑⰮⰋⰞⰎⰀ Ⰻ ⰮⰅⰞⰕⰓⰬ ⰀⰐⰄⰓⰋⰋ ⰔⰍⰑⰕⰑⰓⰀ ⰋⰁⰋ ⰔⰂⰓⰬⰞⰅⰐⰬ ⰮⰋⰔⰅⰜⰀ ⰮⰀⰡ ·Ⱍ·Ⱇ·Ⰼ·Ⰵ·	Omišalj inscription (1536). On the belltower. Date is often mistakenly given as "1533" because that year is referenced at the beginning of the inscription. Engraver: possibly master Pjero of Omišalj or Andrij of Kotor. Ligatures: ⰂⰎ, ⰈⰂ, ⰀⰎ, ⰄⰀ, ⰃⰀ, ⰔⰕ, ⰞⰎ.	(Note: , LP [low res.] (23 February 2013))	(Note: ˙˙˙˙)
1536	Grdoselo (župna kuća)	Ⱍ Ⱇ Ⰼ Ⰵ		(Note: ,)	(Note: ˙)
1537 (April)	Hum (sv. Jeronima na groblju)	Ⱍ Ⱇ Ⰼ Ⰶ ⰀⰒⰓⰎⰀ	Ligatures: ⰒⰓ.	(Note: ,)	(Note: ˙˙)
1537	Kastav (gradske zidine)	Ⱍ̄ Ⱇ̄ Ⰼ̄ Ⰶ̄	Commemorates the construction of the north gate of the city walls. Reproductions and transcriptions were made by Volčić, professor Rziha in 1890 and Vjekoslav Spončić. It was destroyed when used by the Wehrmacht as building material for a bunker in Kastav. A surviving fragment of the Ⱍ was cast aside and is now housed in the Muzejska zbirka in Kastav, discovered in 1972. The rest had been sketched by professor M. Blažičević in 1946 and then taken out in 1949 and placed in the Mjesni narodni odbor but it was lost. A transcription by F. Rziha is kept in Vienna as ÖStA. AVA. DMA. KÜ, 10; reproduced in Mader 2001.		(Note: ˙˙˙˙)
1537	Oprtalj (BDM)	Ⱍ Ⱇ Ⰼ Ⰶ ⰕⰑ ⰒⰋⰔⰀ ⰌⰀ ⰒⰓⰅ ⰮⰀⰕⰅⰌ ⰃⰑⰁⰑ ⰞⰕⰅⰓⰐⰅ ⰍⰀⰄⰀ ⰕⰖ ⰁⰋⰞⰅ	Engraver: pre Matej Gobo. Ligatures: ⰒⰓ, ⰁⰑ.		
1537	Prvić Luka (sv. Marije od Milosti)	M Ⱍ Ⰴ Ⱇ X ... X M V I I	On the lintel of the portal.		(Note: ˙)
1538	Cernik (sv. Bartola)	Ⱍ Ⱇ Ⰼ Ⰷ	Lost around 1900 during the renovation of the church.		(Note: ˙˙˙˙)
1538	Gologorica (sv. Marije)	ⰕⰑ ⰒⰋⰔⰀ ⰆⰀⰍⰀⰐ ⰁⰓⰐⰅ Ⱍ Ⱇ Ⰼ Ⰷ	Engraver: deacon Brne.		
1539	Zadobarje (sv. Antuna)	Ⱍ Ⱇ Ⰼ Ⰽ ...ⰀⰡⰀ	Discovered 2005. Zlatan Kovač and Damir Facan called Darko Žubrinić to investigate the newly discovered Glagolitic inscriptions on the frescoes of the church in September 2006.	(Note: CH [low res.])	

== 1540–1559 ==
Date	Place	Transcription	Name and Notes	Images	Sources
1540–10–01	Draguć (sv. Elizeja)	Ⱍ Ⱇ Ⰽ ⰑⰕⰖⰁⰓⰀ ⰄⰐ ⰒⰓⰂⰋ ⰖⰮⰓⰋ ⰆⰖⰒⰀⰐ ⰞⰋⰮⰀⰜ [Ⰱ]ⰎⰀⰆⰋⰐⰛ	On the south wall. Ligatures: ⰁⰓ, ⰒⰓ, ⰒⰀ, ⰎⰀ.		
1540	Gračišće (sv. Antuna)	ⰣⰓⰋ ⰁⰄⰐⰍⰑ Ⱍ Ⱇ Ⰽ ⰕⰑⰕⰖ ⰁⰋⰞⰅ	Engraver: Juri Bedenko. Ligatures: ⰣⰓ, ⰕⰑ, ⰕⰖ.		
1540	Lovran (sv. Jurja)	Ⱍ Ⱇ Ⰽ			
1540	Ozalj (Žitnica)	Ⱍ Ⱇ Ⰽ	In a residential house of the Zrinski family in the old city known as Žitnica.		
1540	Prnjani by Barban (sv. Margarete	Ⱍ Ⱇ Ⰽ ⰮⰅⰔⰅⰜⰀ ⰋⰣⰐⰀ ⰐⰀ ⰄⰀⰐ ... ? ⰋⰐⰋⰘ ... ⰋⰂⰀⰐⰬ	Engraver: Ivan.		
1540 (or 1540s)	Senj (sv. Jurja)	Ⱍ Ⱇ Ⰽ ... ⰕⰖ ⰍⰀⰒⰅⰎⰖ Ⱁ...?...?ⰁⰀ?ⰓⰎⰔⰃⰀ ⰌⰓⰌⰀ Ⱄ ⰓⰀⰂⰀⰓⰑ[Ⱅ]...Ⱄ...ⰋⰐⰀ...ⰀⰮⰐ	Now lost, but a transcription by Sabljar survives.		
1540	Šumber (sv. Kvirina)	Ⱍ·Ⱇ·Ⰽ· ⰕⰖ ⰜⰓⰋ ⰍⰀⰂ ⰒⰓⰅⰍⰓⰋ ⰆⰖⰒⰀⰐ ⰍⰋⰓⰋⰐ ⰘⰖⰎⰅⰞⰋⰛ	On the façade. Only half of the inscription survives because it was broken in two in a recent expansion, but a reproduction of the full inscription was made by Volčić. Ligatures: ⰒⰓ.		
1541	Brest (zvono sv. Trojstva)	☩ ⰂⰀⰂⰓⰋⰮⰅ ⰮⰀⰓⰕⰋⰐⰀ ⰁⰀⰍⰞⰋⰛⰀ ⰔⰕⰀⰓⰋⰞⰋⰐⰅ · Ⱍ Ⱇ Ⰽ Ⰰ ·1·5·4·1·	Engraver: elder Martin Bakšić, or someone on his behalf. The Bakšić family is otherwise unknown in Brest, so it is likely that the bell was originally poured for ta church in Hum, from whom the relatively poor parish of Brest likely acquired the bell when Hum purchased a new bell. Likely poured in the same workshop from which the other two bells with Glagolitic inscriptions from 1541 were made (for Buzet and Kršan). Destroyed after it was requisitioned on 5 November 1916 by the Austrian army to be melted down, but the 1917 transcription and photograph of dr Anton Gnirs survived.		(Note: ˙˙˙)
1541	Buzet (sv. Marije)	TE DEVM LAVDAMVS ET VIRGINEM MARIAM; 1 5 4 1 Ⱍ Ⱇ Ⰽ Ⰰ	On a small bell known as mrtvačko zvono in the belltower.		
1541	Dragotina	?????ⰝⰗⰍⰀ	Now lost because the Orthodox church it was in was destroyed not long before it was discovered. A 1900 transcription survives by Đure Rožić, a teacher in Maja by Glina, who discovered it by 24 May that year. It was initially analysed as an undecipherable Cyrillic inscription because it had been read upside down but Fučić recognised it as Glagolitic.		(Note: ˙)
1541	Dragotina	[Ⱍ]ⰗⰍⰀ?	On the other side of this inscription or on another stone.		(Note: ˙)
1541	Kastav	ⰣⰓⰀⰋⰂⰀⰋⰮⰅ·ⰁⰑⰆⰋⰅ·[ⰀⰮ]ⰅⰐⰬ·Ⱍ·Ⱇ·Ⰽ·Ⰰ	Originally on the lintel above the door of the city dungeon, it was repurposed as a step below the house of Martin Vlah. Engraver: Juraj. Ligatures: ⰣⰓ. It is now lost, but reproductions survive by Mijat Sabljar and Jakov Volčić.		(Note: ˙˙˙˙)
1541	Radovani (sv. Jurja)	Ⱍ Ⱇ Ⰽ Ⰰ ⰔⰋⰅ ⰒⰋⰔⰀ ⰒⰒ ⰮⰋⰘⰑⰂⰋ Ⰾ ⰮⰀⰓⰍⰖⰝⰋⰛ [Ⰸ]ⰁⰅⰮⰀ ⰁⰖⰄⰖⰛⰋ ⰂⰀⰕⰑ ⰂⰓⰋⰮⰅ ⰒⰎⰂⰐ ⰁⰅⰮ[Ⰰ]	Engraver: Mihovil Markučić parish priest of Beram. Ligatures: ⰘⰑⰂ, ⰁⰖ, ⰕⰑ, ⰂⰓ, ⰒⰎⰂⰐ.		
1541	Šterna (sv. Mihovila)	... Ⱍ Ⱇ Ⰽ Ⰰ ⰒⰓⰅ ⰅⰓⰎⰮ ⰒⰎⰂⰐ ⰮⰑⰘⰓ ⰄⰓⰆⰂⰐⰍ Ⱎ	Kept at the parish church in Šterna. Mentions a priest Jerolim. Ligatures: ⰒⰓ, ⰒⰎⰂⰐ, ⰮⰑ, ⰄⰓⰆⰂⰐ.		(Note: ˙˙˙˙˙˙˙˙˙˙)
1541 (? Friday)	Barban (sv. Antuna, južni zid)	ⱅ𞀑 ⱂⰻⱄⰰ ⰶⰰⰽⰰⱀ ⰱ𞀓ⱀⰰⱃⰴⱁ ⰸⰳ𞀑ⰾⰵ ⰳ𞀑ⱃⰻⱌⰵ ⱂⰵⱅⰰⰽ ⱂⱃⰵⰴ ⱄⰰⱀⱞⱁⱞ ⰱⰰⱃⰱⰰⱀⱄⰽⰻⱞ ⱍ̄ ⱇ̄ ⰽ̄ ⰰ̄ ⰱ𞀑ⰳ ⱞⱆ ⱂ𞀑ⱞ𞀑ⰸⰻ	Engraver: deacon Brnardo of Gologorica. Ligatures for ⰕⰑ, ⰔⰀ, ⰆⰀ, ⰁⰓ, ⰃⰑ, ⰮⰑ, ⰁⰑ, ⰮⰖ, ⰒⰑ.		
1541?	Jurandvor (sv. Lucije)	...Ⰻ ⰑⰂⰋ ⰃⰓⰑⰁ ⰝⰋ ⰐⰋ ⰒⰒⰬ ⰮⰋⰘⰑ......ⰮⰑⰃⰀ	Gravestone of pop Miho. Discovered near the church in 2023 by Ivan Mance, who photographed it upside down. Ligatures: ⰕⰂ.		
1542–05–02	Vrbnik (sv. Franje)	ⰂⰋⰮⰅ ⰁⰑⰈⰋ^{Ⰵ} Ⰻ ⰁⰎⰀ. ⰆⰅⰐⰅ ⰄⰋⰂⰋ ⰮⰀⰓⰋⰅ ⰀⰮⰅⰐ ⰎⰅⰕ ⰃⰑⰔ ⰒⰄⰐⰘⰬ Ⱍ Ⱇ Ⰽ Ⰱ ⰮⰋⰔⰅⰜⰀ ⰮⰀⰡ ⰄⰐ Ⰱ ⰕⰖ ⰍⰀⰒⰅⰎⰖ ⰮⰀⰓⰕⰋⰐⰀ ⰁⰑⰈⰀⰐⰋⰛⰀ ⰆⰍⰀⰐ ⰁⰀⰓⰋⰛ ⰔⰋⰐ ⰝⰋⰐⰅⰘ	Ligatures: ⰁⰎ, ⰁⰑ. Now lost, but a reproduction by Sabljar survives.		
1542	Kršan (sv. Jakova na groblju)	Ⱍ Ⱇ Ⰽ Ⰱ M ✿ D ✿ XLI ✿ I ✿ ☩ ⰂⰀ ⰂⰓⰋ· ⰃⰑ· ⰀⰐⰄⰓⰋⰡ ⰍⰓⰞⰀⰋⰐ ⰒⰑⰒⰀ ⰀⰐⰕⰑⰐⰀ ⰞⰂⰅⰓⰍⰀ Ⰻ ⰆⰖⰒⰀ ⰎⰖⰍⰅ ⰮⰀⰓⰕⰋⰛⰀ	On the bell. The Glagolitic date is 1542 which matches the Roman numerals LI ✿ I on the inscription, but Fučić read L ✿ I resulting in a discrepancy between the Glagolitic date and his reading of 1541 for the Roman date. The bell was requisitioned by the Austrian army during WWI. It was returned in 1962 and placed in the Pazin Museum.		(Note: ˙˙˙)
1543	Boljun (sv. Kuzme i Damjana)	Ⱍ Ⱇ̆ Ⰽ̆ Ⰲ̆ ⰕⰀⰄⰀ ⰕⰝⰀⰞⰅ	Commemorates the construction of the sacristy. Uses ligature ⰕⰝⰀⰞ. Discovered 1979 when part of the facade fell off.		
1543	Beram (sv. Marije na Škrilinah, južni zid)	·Ⱍ·Ⱇ·Ⰽ·Ⰲ· ⰔⰋⰅ ⰒⰋⰔⰀ ⰒⰑⰒ ⰣⰓⰋ ⰃⰎⰀⰂⰋⰐⰋⰛ ⰍⰀⰒⰅⰎⰀⰐ ⰮⰖⰞⰍⰑⰐⰑⰂ ⰂⰁⰅⰓⰮⰅ	Engraver: priest Juri Glavinić chaplain of the family of captain Kristofor Mosconi of Pazin in Beram. Ligatures: ⰒⰑ, ⰣⰓ, ⰃⰎ, ⰮⰖ, ⰐⰑ. Kristofor Mosconi inherited his position from his father Aleks, a merchant from Ptuj of North Italian origin, who purchased the Pazin Margraviate in 1532. After the death of his father in 1540 and of his brother Ivan on 27 April 1542, Kristofor became the sole margrave.		
1543	Hrastovlje (sv. Trojstva)	Ⱍ·Ⱇ·Ⰽ·Ⰲ· ⰕⰑ ⰒⰋⰔⰀⰘ ⰒⰓⰅ ⰋⰂⰀⰐ	Engraver: priest Ivan.		
1543	Lovran (sv. Jurja)	Ⱍ Ⱇ Ⰽ Ⰲ ⰄⰀ ⰒⰅ ⰒⰑⰒⰬ ⰃⰓⰃⰓ ⰮⰎⰀⰄⰖ ⰮⰀⰞⰖ	Engraver: priest Grgur. Ligatures: ⰒⰑ, ⰃⰓ, ⰄⰀ, ⰎⰀ, ⰮⰀ.		
1543	Ozalj (Žitnica)	Ⱍ Ⱇ Ⰽ Ⰲ	106/168 cm. In a residential house of the Zrinski family in the old city known as Žitnica.		
1543	Ozalj (Žitnica)	Ⱍ Ⱇ Ⰽ Ⰲ	145/169 cm. On a lower black border. In a residential house of the Zrinski family in the old city known as Žitnica.		
1543	Senj (cathedral)	·Ⱍ·Ⱇ·Ⰽ·Ⰲ· Ⰲ ⰕⰑ ⰂⰓⰮⰅ ⰁⰘⰖ ⰒⰓⰍⰕⰓⰋ ⰍⰐⰑⰐⰍⰀ ·Ⰱ· ⰂⰎⰔ ⰕⰎⰐⰀ ·Ⰱ· ⰒⰖⰝⰀ ⰐⰋⰐⰀ ·Ⰱ·	Commemorates the construction of the facade of the cathedral. After Kukuljević it was lost track of and not rediscovered until 1969, in the storage of the Arheološki muzej. Now kept at Hrvatski povijesni muzej in Zagreb (as inv. br. 6836). Ligatures: ⰂⰕⰑ, ⰂⰓ, ⰒⰓ, ⰕⰓ, ⰂⰎ, ⰕⰎ.		(Note: ˙˙˙˙˙˙˙˙˙˙˙˙˙)
1543-02	Kanfanar (sv. Marije Magdalene)	Ⱍ Ⱇ Ⰽ Ⰲ ⰮⰋⰔⰅⰜⰀ ⰗⰀⰓⰀ ⰐⰀ Ⰳ...	One of the newly discovered graffitos.		
1544	Kastav (kuća br. 72)	Ⱍ Ⱇ Ⰽ Ⰳ ⰋⰂⰀⰐ ⰣⰓⰍⰑⰂⰬ	Engraver: Ivan Jurkov. Ligatures: ⰣⰓ, ⰑⰂ, ⰂⰀ. Originally in an older house, repurposed for a newer house.		
1544	Ozalj (Žitnica)	ⰑⰆⰅⰐⰋ ⰔⰅ Ⰳ ⰈⰓⰋⰐⰔⰍⰋ [ⰮⰋ]ⰍⰎⰖⰞ ⰃⰑⰔⰒⰖ ⰍⰀⰕⰀⰓⰋⰐⰖ ⰑⰄ ⰗⰓⰀⰐⰍⰀⰒⰀⰐⰑⰂ	In a residential house of the Zrinski family in the old city known as Žitnica. Ligatures: ⰈⰓ, ⰃⰑ, ⰑⰄ, ⰐⰑ.		
1544	Ozalj (Žitnica)	ⰕⰑ ⰒⰋⰔⰀ ⰋⰂⰀⰐ ⰕⰂⰓⰄⰔⰎⰀⰂⰛ	In a residential house of the Zrinski family in the old city known as Žitnica. Engraver: Ivan Tvrdoslavić. Ligatures: ⰕⰑ, ⰂⰓ.		
1545–12–16	Pićan (sv. Mihovila na groblju)	·Ⱍ·Ⱇ·Ⰽ·Ⰴ Ⱞ[Ⰻ]ⰔⰅⰜⰀ ⰄⰅⰍⰕⰅ[ⰁⰓⰀ] ⰄⰐⰬ ⰅⰉ			
1545	Hum (kuća br. 8)	·Ⱍ·Ⱇ·Ⰽ·Ⰴ· ⰂⰀ ⰂⰓⰋⰮⰅ ⰆⰖⰒⰀⰐⰀ ⰃⰓⰀ ⰁⰀⰍⰞⰋⰛⰀ	On a stone stool in front of a house once owned by Franjo Klobas. Ligatures: ⰂⰀ, ⰂⰓ, ⰒⰀ, ⰐⰀ, ⰁⰀ.		
1545	Veprinac (kuća br. 2)	Ⱍ Ⱇ Ⰽ Ⰴ ⰋⰕⰅ	Natpis na kanoničkoj kući. In a building that was once the parish priest's house.		
1546-03	Privlaka	ⰑⰂⰄⰋ ⰒⰂⰀ ⰀⰕⰋⰌ ⰎⰋⰂⰀ ⰖⰞⰍⰑⰂⰋ Ⱍ ⰘⰓⰀⰁⰓ Ⱆ ⰂⰑⰐⰋⰜⰋ ⰎⰖⰁⰎⰅⰐⰋ Ⱆ ⰄⰓⰖⰞⰋⰐⰋ ⰔⰕⰀⰐⰑⰂⰋⰕⰋ Ⱆ ⰂⰡⰓⰋ Ⰻ ⰍⰓⰋⰒⰑⰔⰐⰋ Ⱆ ⰄⰅⰎⰖ [Ⱍ Ⱇ] Ⰽ Ⰵ ⰐⰀ ⰮⰀⰓⰝⰀ	Transcriptions made by Luka Jelić and Nedo Grbin.		(Note: ˙˙)
1546	Beram (sv. Marije na Škrilinah, južni zid)	ⰕⰑ ⰒⰋⰔⰀ ⰆⰀⰍⰀⰐ ⰮⰋⰍ̈ⰎⰀ ⰔⰀⰓⰝⰋⰛ ⰐⰀ ⰎⰅⰕⰑ ⰃⰑⰄⰘ Ⱍ Ⱇ Ⰵ Ⰽ	Engraver: deacon Mikula Sarčić. Ligatures: ⰒⰑ, ⰕⰑ, ⰁⰑ, ⰃⰑ, ⰕⰂⰑ, ⰓⰀ, ⰃⰀ.		
1546	Beram		Names parish priest Mihovil Markučić and chaplain Jure Glavinić. Not in Fučić 1982, so possibly a mistake in Fučić 1969.		
1546	Barban (sv. Antuna, sjeverni zid)	Ⱅ𞀑 ⰒⰋⰔⰀ ⰋⰂⰀⰐⰬ ⰎⰋ[?]ⰀⰝⰅⰐⰬ ⰐⰀⰒⰅⰕⰓⰂⰖ ⰄⰀ ⰮⰖ ⰁⰑⰃ ⰒⰑⰮⰑⰈⰋ Ⱍ Ⱇ Ⰽ Ⰵ	Engraver: Ivan "Li?ačen". Uses ligature ⰕⰑ.		
1546 (Note: Not 1502 as some sources state.)	Novaki Pazinski	Ⱍ Ⱇ Ⰽ Ⰵ	Brought from Pazinski Novaci where it had stood above the doors of an old ruinous and incorporated into a stable belonging to V. Maretić of house number 4 in Ćusi. The original builder of that house had been a cooper. Discovered by Antun Banko who notified Branko Fučić on 29 August 1957.		
1546	Hrastovlje (sv. Trojstva)	Ⱍ Ⱇ Ⰽ Ⰵ ⰔⰋⰅ ⰒⰋⰔⰀ ⰒⰑⰒ ⰃⰓⰃⰓ ⰎⰖⰆⰋⰛ ... ⰝⰋⰛ ⰋⰈ ⰍⰓⰐⰋⰃⰅ ⰁⰖⰄⰖⰛ ⰍⰀⰮⰅⰎⰀ[Ⱀ] ⰍⰖⰁⰅⰄⰅ ⰒⰑⰎ	Engraver: priest Grgur of Krniga chaplain in Kubed.		
1546	Hrastovlje (sv. Trojstva)	Ⱍ Ⱇ Ⰽ Ⰵ ⰔⰋⰅ ⰒⰋⰔⰀ ⰒⰑⰒ ⰮⰀⰕⰅⰋ ⰞⰍⰓⰒⰑⰝⰋⰛ ⰈⰎⰑⰒⰀⰓⰀ	Engraver: priest Matej Škrpočić of Lopar. The priest was most likely from Lopar, Koper.		
1546	Pićan (sv. Mihovila na groblju)	ⰕⰑⰕⰖ ⰁⰋⰘ ?ⰀⰐⰕ ⰒⰑⰒ	Engraver: pop Santo. Ligatures: ⰒⰑ.		
1546	Vrbnik (kuća br. 81)	Ⰻ̄ⰔⰋ'ⰀⰓⰡ Ⰾ[ⰅⰕ]... Ⱍ Ⱇ·Ⰽ·Ⰵ ⰕⰑⰅ Ⰽ... ⰈⰄⰀⰕ' ⰮⰀⰓ[ⰕⰋⰐ]... ⰀⰔⰂⰑⰅ ⰃⰓⰋⰘ[Ⰻ] ... ⰔⰋⰐ ⰒⰑⰒ Ⰱ... ⰛⰐⰋⰍ ⰮⰆⰕ... ⰎⰀⰆ ·	It was discovered by Frane Sabljić of Vrbnik while taking it out of the wall to preserve the earlier inscription from 1340 on the visible side. Engraver: Barić Bozanić the Younger (son of Martin) or master Blaž. Likely the same Blaž who took part in the construction of the belltower of the parish church of Vrbnik in 1527. Ligatures: ⰕⰑ, ⰈⰄ, ⰂⰑ, ⰃⰓ, ⰒⰑ, ⰎⰀⰆ.	(Note: 1982 (2017))	
1546 (about)	Tinjan		Engraver: notary priest Vincenc Brnković. An inscription or a note in a manuscript (absent from Fučić 1982)?		
1547	Barban (sv. Antuna, sjeverni zid)	ⰲⱈⱁ ⰰⱞⱀ ⰾⱅⱜ ⱍ ⱇ ⰽ ⰸ ⱅ𞀑 ⱂⰻⱄⰰ ⱀⰰ ⰳ𞀓	Ligatures: ⰎⰕ, ⰕⰑ, ⰃⰓ.		
1547	Beram (sv. Marije na Škrilinah, sjeverni zid)	Ⱍ Ⱇ Ⰽ Ⰶ ⰣⰓⰋ ⰘⰎⰀ... ⰒⰋ...	Engraver: Juri "Hla...". Ligatures: ⰣⰓ, ⰘⰎ.		
1548	Beram (sv. Marije na Škrilinah, sjeverni zid)	ⰕⰑ ⰒⰋⰔⰀ ⰆⰀⰍⰀⰐ ⰎⰑⰂⰓⰅ Ⱍ Ⱇ Ⰽ Ⰷ	Engraver: deacon Lovre. Ligatures: ⰕⰑ, ⰂⰓ.		
1548–07–30	Beram (sv. Marije na Škrilinah, sjeverni zid)	Ⱍ Ⱇ Ⰽ Ⰷ ⰐⰀ ⰄⰐⰋ Ⰼ ⰣⰎⰅⰡ ⰖⰮⰓⰅ...Ⰻ...Ⰽ ⰔⰋⰐ ⰮⰀⰕⰅ...Ⰶ	Commemorates the death of a son of a certain Mate. Uses ligature ⰄⰐ.		
1548	Črni Kal (kuća br. 53)	☩ ? 1786ⰝⰗ Ⰽ Ⰷ	On a stone oil vase. The house whose basement it is in front of once belonged to Franc Bažec. Discovered by Edvilije Gardina of Kopar who sent a photograph to Fučić in 1980.		
1548	Draguć (sv. Roka)	Ⱍ Ⱇ Ⰽ Ⰷ ⰮⰋⰔ	On the north wall.		
1548	Ozalj (Žitnica)	Ⱍ Ⱇ Ⰽ Ⰷ	In a residential house of the Zrinski family in the old city known as Žitnica.		
1549–03–20	Gologorica (Svih svetih na groblju)	·Ⱍ·Ⱇ·Ⰽ·Ⰸ· ⰮⰝⰀ·Ⰻ	At the base of the holy water bowlstone in the grave chapel.		
1549	Lovran (sv. Jurja)	ⰕⰑ ⰃⰑⰂⰑⰓⰅ ⰮⰓⰕⰂⰋ ⰆⰋⰂⰑⰮⰖ ⰝⰀ ⰮⰅ ⰃⰎⰅⰄⰀⰞ ⰀⰎⰅ ⰝⰀ ⰔⰅ ⰝⰖⰄⰋⰞ ⰀⰎⰅ ⰐⰅ ⰈⰐⰀⰞ ⰄⰀ ⰔⰀⰮ ⰁⰋⰎ Ⰻ ⰡⰔⰬ ⰂⰝⰅⰓⰀ ⰍⰀⰍⰑ ⰔⰋ ⰕⰋ ⰄⰀⰐⰀⰔ Ⰰ ⰕⰋ ⰑⰛⰅⰞ ⰁⰋⰕ ⰈⰖⰕⰓⰀ ⰀⰍⰑ ⰔⰀⰮ ⰡⰔⰬ ⰄⰀⰐⰀⰔ Ⱍ Ⱇ Ⰽ Ⰸ ⰕⰑ ⰒⰋⰔⰀ ⰆⰀⰍⰀⰐ ⰮⰀⰓⰍⰑ	On the floor below the second soldier. Engraver: deacon Marko. Ligatures: ⰕⰑ, ⰃⰑ, ⰂⰑ, ⰍⰑ, ⰑⰛ, ⰕⰓ.	(Note: [low res.])	
1549	Lovran (sv. Jurja)	Ⱍ Ⱇ Ⰽ Ⰸ	On dark green paint by the third soldier.	(Note: [low res.])	
1500s (first half)	Beli (crkva Prikazanja BDM)	...Ⰾ... ⰔⰜ...[Ⱞ] ⰀⰓⰬⰕⰋⰐ ⰋⰡⰍⰑⰂⰬ ⰞⰍⰑⰕⰋⰛⰬ ⰀⰍⰀⰞⰕⰀⰎⰄⰋ ⰋⰃⰖⰂⰅⰓⰐⰀⰄⰑⰓⰋ ⰂⰔⰅ ⰁⰓ ⰀⰕⰬⰅ ⰔⰕⰑⰃⰀ ⰞⰅⰁⰅⰔⰕⰡⰐⰀ ⰋⰗⰀⰁⰋⰡⰐⰀ ⰍⰋ ⰃⰖⰂⰅⰓⰐⰀⰄⰖⰓⰋ ⰈⰃⰑⰓⰀ ⰒⰋⰔⰀⰐⰋ ⰋⰮⰋⰞⰅ ⰑⰁⰎⰀⰔⰕⰬ ⰑⰄⰬ ⰔⰕⰑⰃⰀ ⰑⰕⰜⰀ ⰒⰀⰒⰋ ⰣⰎⰋⰡ ⰄⰀⰑⰐⰋ ⰋⰍⰋ ⰁⰓⰀⰕⰋ ⰁⰖⰄⰖ ⰒⰑⰎ ⰐⰋⰘⰬ ⰄⰀ ⰋⰮⰀⰣ...	Ulomak natpisa o nekom privilegiju bratovštine sv. Sebastijana i Fabijana. Mentions a privilegium of pope Julius II or III. Originally located near the altar church of the lay fraternity, but in the 19th century it was reused for a bench in front of a house next to the župna kuća. Thanks to Milčetić, when the side-chapel M. Božje was built in 1885 on the north side of the parish church, the parish priest Mihovil Mužina had it incorporated into its western wall.		(Note: ˙˙˙˙)
1550	Beram (sv. Marije na Škrilinah, južni zid)	Ⱍ Ⱇ Ⰾ ⰒⰑⰄⰑⰘ ⰒⰑⰄ ⰎⰖⰒⰑⰃⰎⰀⰂ	Below the Mihovil inscription. Ligatures: ⰒⰑ, ⰃⰎ.		
1550	Rovinjsko Selo (kuća obitelji Ugrin)	Ⱍ Ⱇ Ⰾ ⰍⰀⰄⰀ Ⱑ	On the lintel of a house belonging to the Ugrin family. Lost when the house was demolished in 1932. Both Jakov Volčić and Josup Kastelac (of Sutlovreč) made reproductions, one of which was given by Bratulić and then Fučić.		(Note: ˙˙˙)
1550	San Giovanni di Duino (s. Giovanni)	Ⱍ Ⱇ Ⰾ [0/Ⱁ]	Reproduction in Mader 1987.	(Note: 1990)	(Note: ˙˙˙˙)
1550	Vrbnik	... ⰀⰮⰐⰬ ...... [ⰮⰀⰓ]ⰕⰋⰐⰀ ⰁⰑⰈⰛⰀ [ⰋⰐⰅⰃⰑⰂⰀ ⰑⰔ]ⰕⰐⰍⰀ Ⱍ·Ⱇ·Ⰾ	Grave of Martin Bozanić. Discovered 1982 in the Desetinac.		
1551	Beram (sv. Marije na Škrilinah, sjeverni zid)	Ⱍ Ⱇ Ⰾ Ⰰ			
1551	Beram (sv. Marije na Škrilinah, sjeverni zid)	Ⱍ Ⱇ Ⰾ Ⰰ ⰄⰀ ⰖⰮⰓⰅ ⰀⰐⰋⰜⰀ ⰃⰑⰔⰒⰋⰐⰀ ⰘⰛⰋ; ~~ⰍⰀ ⰁⰋⰞⰅ~~ ⰘⰛⰋ	Commemorates the death of Anica, someone's illegitimate daughter.		
1551	Dolenja Vas (sv. Martina)	ⰂⰘⰂⰑ ⰋⰮⰅ [ⰀⰮⰅⰐ ⰎⰅⰕ ... Ⱍ] Ⱇ Ⰾ Ⰰ ⰮⰑⰌⰔⰕⰓ ⰣⰓⰋ Ⰳ ⰎⰀⰂⰋⰐⰋⰛ ⰕⰀⰄⰀ Ⰱ[Ⰵ]ⰗⰜⰋⰡ[Ⱀ] ⰁⰓⰐⰀⰜ ⰒⰎⰒⰎⰋⰛ ⰀⰐⰕ[ⰑⰐ ... ⰒⰋ]ⰎⰋ[ⰒⰎⰋⰛ] ⰮⰀⰕⰍⰑ ⰞⰕⰓⰀⰌ ⰮⰀⰕⰅ ⰒⰅⰓⰍⰑⰂⰋⰛ ⰁⰓⰕⰑⰐ ⰒⰎⰒⰎⰋⰛ ⰮⰋⰘⰅⰎ ⰒⰎⰒⰎⰋⰛ ⰮⰀⰓⰍⰑ ⰒⰎⰒⰎⰋⰛ ⰂⰋⰄ ⰖⰎⰡⰐⰛ ⰮⰀⰕⰅ ⰞⰑⰞⰕⰓⰋⰛ ⰮⰀⰕⰅ ⰃⰎⰂⰋⰛ ⰃⰓⰃⰑⰓ ⰍⰓⰀⰌⰜⰓ ⰀⰐⰕⰑⰐ ⰍⰓⰐⰅⰎ ⰃⰓⰆⰅ ⰞⰕⰀⰓⰜ ⰀⰐⰕⰑⰐ ⰔⰑⰝⰋⰛ ⰣⰓⰞⰀ Ⱅ...Ⱋ	A gravestone inscription inside the church. Now fixed to the wall of the sanctuary behind the main altar, but around 1900 it was outside the church in front of the entrance to the sacristy. Ligatures: ⰕⰓ, ⰣⰓ, ⰂⰑ, ⰎⰀ, ⰕⰀ, ⰁⰓ, ⰒⰎ, ⰍⰑ, ⰕⰑ, ⰃⰎ, ⰃⰓ, ⰃⰑ, ⰔⰑ.		
1551	Grimalda (sv. Jurja)	Ⱍ Ⱇ Ⰾ Ⰰ ⰒⰑⰒ Ⱂ ⰕⰓ Ⰰ Ⰾ... Ⱂ Ⱅ	On the base of the holy water stone that was originally in the Crkva sv. Jurja and now in the new church built at the beginning of the 20th century. Engraver: priest Petar (the same hand responsible for the 1557 holy water inscription in Marčenigla and the 1562 holy water inscription in Vrh).		
1551	Lovran (sv. Jurja)	Ⱍ Ⱇ Ⰾ Ⰰ ⰕⰑ ⰒⰋⰔⰀ ⰆⰀⰍⰀⰐⰬ ⰮⰋⰍⰖⰎⰀ	Engraver: deacon Mikula. Ligatures: ⰕⰑ, ⰍⰖ.		
1551	Paz (sv. Vida)	Ⱍ Ⱇ Ⰾ Ⰰ ⰕⰑ ⰒⰋ[ⰔⰀ] ...			
1551	Šumber	Ⱍ·Ⱇ·Ⰾ·Ⰰ· ⰕⰑⰅ ⰘⰋⰆⰀ ⰮⰋⰘⰅⰎⰀ ⰖⰎⰋⰂⰀⰎⰋⰓⰋⰛⰀ	Engraver: Mihel Ulivalirić. Ligatures: ⰕⰑ. Now lost, but a transcription by Volčić survives.		
1552–03–16	Hum	·Ⱍ·Ⱇ·Ⰾ·Ⰱ· ⰮⰔⰅⰜⰀ ⰮⰀⰓⰝⰀ ⰐⰀ ⰄⰐ ⰅⰉ ⰂⰀⰂⰓⰮⰅⰆⰖⰒⰀⰐⰀ ... ⰃⰓⰆⰋⰐⰋⰛⰀ ⰮⰅⰞⰕⰓ... ⰁⰀ ⰞⰕⰋⰡⰝⰋⰛ ⰈⰄⰓ... ⰒⰑⰒ ⰋⰂⰀⰐ ...	On the belltower. Engraver: master Baštijančić. Ligatures: ⰃⰓ, ⰕⰓ, ⰈⰄ, ⰒⰑ, ⰒⰀ, ⰐⰀ. Destroyed in 1921 on the orders of the Italian administration in Buzet. But an anonymous reproduction survived, once owned by Ivan Milčetić and now in Arhiv HAZU as VIII-135. Transcriptions had been made by A. Kalac and Vjekoslav Spinčić.		(Note: ˙˙˙˙˙˙)
1552	Beram (sv. Marije na Škrilinah, sjeverni zid)	Ⱍ Ⱇ Ⰾ Ⰱ ⰄⰀ ⰖⰮⰓⰅ ⰗⰖⰮⰋⰡ ⰘⰛⰋ ⰮⰀⰓⰕⰋⰐⰀ ⰃⰖⰞⰕⰋⰛⰀ ⰁⰋⰞⰅ ⰎⰋⰒⰀ ⰄⰋⰂⰑⰋⰍⰀ ⰕⰅⰓⰅ ⰄⰑⰁⰓⰀ ⰍⰀⰄⰀ ⰁⰖⰄⰅ Ⰴ[?]Ⱞ ⰞⰕⰅⰎ?...ⰂⰅⰎ ⰆⰀⰎⰑⰔⰕⰀⰐ	Commemorates the death of Fumija daughter of Martin Guštić. Ligatures: ⰃⰓ, ⰂⰑ, ⰁⰖ, ⰄⰑ.		
1552	Hum (sv. Jeronima)		On the belltower, commemorating its construction.		
1552	Kaštelir-Labinci (sv. Trojstva)	ⰕⰑ ⰒⰋⰔⰀ ⰣⰓⰋ ⰔⰋⰒⰋⰛ Ⱍ Ⱇ Ⰴ Ⰱ	Engraver: Juri Sipić. Ligatures: ⰕⰑ, ⰣⰓ.		
1552	Vranja (sv. Petra)	[Ⱍ] Ⱇ Ⰾ Ⰱ			
1552 (Note: Mistakenly given by some sources as 1556.)	Vrh (Uznesenja BDM)	Ⱍ Ⱇ Ⰾ Ⰱ	On the stone holy water bowl.		
1552	Žunovec (sv. Petra)	Ⱍ·Ⱇ Ⰾ Ⰱ ⰄⰀⰐⰋⰅⰎ ⰒⰀⰂⰎⰋⰛ ⰔⰋⰄⰋ ⰔⰅ ⰁⰑⰆⰌ ⰂⰑⰎⰀ ⰒⰑ... ⰒⰑⰋⰔⰍⰀ	Engraver: Danijel Pavlič. Ligatures: ⰕⰑ, ⰒⰑ, ⰁⰓ. Ligatures: ⰕⰑ, ⰒⰑ, ⰁⰓ.		
1553	Draguć (sv. Roka)	Ⱍ Ⱇ Ⰾ Ⰲ	On the north wall.		
1553	Šumber (sv. Marije)	M L V III ·B· ·V; HIC·DOMVS·DEI·EST EPORTACELIS Ⱍ·Ⱇ Ⰾ Ⰲ			
1553	Vrbnik (Uznesenja BDM)	Ⰲ ⰋⰮⰅ ⰁⰆⰋⰅ ⰀⰮⰐ Ⱍ Ⱇ Ⰾ Ⰲ ⰑⰂⰖ ⰍⰀⰒ ⰅⰎⰖ ⰝⰋⰐⰋ ⰒⰑⰒⰬ ⰮⰀⰓⰕⰐⰬ ⰔⰀⰃⰀⰐⰋ ⰛⰬ Ⰰ ⰮⰞⰕⰓⰋ ⰀⰐⰕⰐⰬ Ⰹ ⰮⰕⰋⰌⰬ ⰈⰋⰄⰓⰋⰛⰋ	Engraver: meštar Anton Zidarić or meštar Matij Zidarić. Ligatures: ⰕⰓ, ⰄⰓ, ⰃⰀ. Originally in the adjacent Baćina kapela, but that was demolished in 1825 and its stones used to expand the parish church where it is now.		
1554	Beram (sv. Marije na Škrilinah, južni zid)	·Ⱍ·Ⱇ Ⰾ Ⰳ			
1554	Draguć (sv. Roka)	Ⱍ Ⱇ Ⰾ Ⰳ ⰂⰀ ⰝⰀⰔ ⰍⰀⰄⰀ ⰔⰅ ⰋⰔⰔ ⰓⰑⰄⰋ ⰑⰐⰀ ⰐⰑⰛ ⰔⰅ ⰒⰓⰅⰔⰂⰋⰕⰎⰋ ⰍⰀⰍⰑ Ⱁ ⰒⰑⰎⰄⰐⰅ ⰔⰂⰋⰕⰎⰑ ⰁⰋ ⰈⰀⰕⰑ ... ⰒⰓⰑⰓⰑⰍ ⰒⰔⰞⰅ Ⰻ ⰐⰑⰛ ⰡⰍⰑ Ⰻ ⰄⰀⰐ ⰒⰓⰅⰔⰂⰕ ⰔⰅ	On the north wall. A commentary on Psalm 138,12. Ligatures: ⰓⰑ, ⰐⰑ, ⰒⰑ, ⰕⰎ, ⰕⰑ, ⰒⰓ, ⰍⰑ, ⰂⰀ, ⰝⰀ, ⰀⰄⰀ, ⰐⰀⰐ, ⰍⰀ, ⰈⰀ, ⰄⰀ.		
1554	Svetivinčenat (sv. Katarine)	Ⱍ·Ⱇ·Ⰾ·Ⰳ ⰕⰑⰒⰋⰔⰀ ⰗⰓⰀ ⰁⰓⰐⰀⰓⰄⰋⰐⰬ ⰓⰀⰁⰎⰀⰐⰋⰐ ⰘⰑⰄⰅⰛⰋ ⰒⰓⰋⰍⰑ ⰋⰔⰕⰓⰋⰅ ⰐⰀⰕⰓⰋ ⰄⰐⰋ ⰀⰃⰖⰔⰕⰀ ⰮⰋ[ⰔⰅ]ⰜⰀ ⰐⰅⰁⰋⰞⰅ ⰄⰑⰁⰓⰀ ⰎⰋⰕⰋⰐⰀ ⰂⰅⰎⰅ ⰁⰑⰆⰅ ⰒⰑⰮⰑⰈⰋ	Engraver: fra Brnardin Rabljanin. Ligatures: ⰕⰑ, ⰁⰓ, ⰒⰓ, ⰕⰓ.		(Note: ˙˙)
1555–01–22	Žminj (sv. Antuna pustinjaka)	Ⱍ Ⱇ Ⰾ Ⰴ ⰮⰅⰜⰀ ⰒⰓⰂⰀⰓⰀ Ⰻ Ⰱ ⰍⰀⰄⰀ ⰈⰀⰒⰋⰔⰘ ⰑⰂⰑ	Ligatures: ⰒⰓ, ⰂⰑ, ⰂⰀ, ⰓⰀ, ⰍⰀð ⰄⰀ, ⰈⰀ.		
1555–08–03	Svetvinčenat (sv. Katarine)	Ⱍ Ⱇ Ⰾ Ⰳ ⰕⰑ ⰒⰋⰔⰀ ⰗⰓⰀ ⰁⰓⰐⰀⰓⰄⰋⰐⰮ ⰓⰀⰁⰎⰀⰐⰋⰐ ⰘⰑⰄⰅⰛⰋ ⰒⰓⰋⰍⰑ ⰋⰔⰕⰓⰋⰅ ⰐⰀⰕⰓⰋ ⰄⰐⰋ ⰀⰃⰑⰔⰕⰀ ⰮⰋ[ⰔⰅ]ⰜⰀ ⰐⰅⰁⰋⰞⰅ ⰄⰑⰁⰓⰀ ⰎⰋⰕⰋⰐⰀ ⰂⰅⰎⰅ ⰁⰑⰆⰅ ⰒⰑⰮⰑⰈⰋ	Engraver: Brnardin of Rab. Ligatures: ⰕⰑ, ⰁⰓ, ⰒⰓ, ⰕⰓ.		
1555–09–01	Dobrinj (sv. Stjepana)	Ⱍ Ⱇ Ⰾ Ⰴ ⰒⰓⰂⰋ ⰄⰀⰐⰬ ⰔⰅⰍ ⰕⰅⰁⰓⰀ ⰮⰅⰞⰕⰓ Ⱂ ⰅⰕⰓⰋⰮⰋⰘⰑⰂⰋ	Engraver: masters Petar and Mihovil. Ligatures: ⰒⰓ, ⰕⰓ, ⰘⰑ.		
1555	Beram (sv. Marije na Škrilinah, južni zid)	Ⱍ Ⱇ Ⰾ Ⰴ ⰕⰑ ⰒⰋⰔⰀ ⰒⰀⰂⰅ ⰁⰓⰐⰍⰑⰂⰋⰛ ⰍⰀⰄⰀ	Engraver: Pave Brnković. Ligatures: ⰕⰑ, ⰁⰓ, ⰍⰑ.		
1555	Mali Mlun (sv. Ivana)	Ⱍ Ⱇ Ⰾ Ⰴ ⰔⰕⰀⰓⰓⰅⰞⰋⰐⰀ ⰡⰍⰑⰂ ⰂⰓⰐⰅ ⰕⰋⰛⰬⰂⰀⰕⰕⰑⰂ ⰓⰅⰮⰅ	Engraver: starešina Jakov Vrnetić. Ligatures: ⰕⰀⰓ (considered a mistake by the scribe), ⰂⰓ, ⰕⰋ, ⰕⰕⰋ/ⰕⰋⰋ (considered a mistake by the scribe), ⰛⰓ (vertical ligature for letters not in sequence due to space constraints).		
1555	Slum (sv. Matija)	Ⱍ Ⱇ Ⰾ Ⰴ	On the exterior of the presbytery.		
1555?	Vranja (sv. Petra)	Ⱍ·Ⱇ ... ⰕⰑ ...	A date "1555" is written right beneath it in Arabic numerals.		
1556	Boljun	ⰂⰀ ⰕⰑ ⰂⰓⰋⰮⰅ ⰁⰋ ⰒⰎⰂⰀⰐ ⰣⰓⰋ ⰮⰋⰘⰅⰎⰋⰛ ⰁⰑⰎⰣⰐⰔⰍⰋ Ⱍ·Ⱇ·Ⰾ·Ⰵ·	A now lost inscription found on a residential house. Survives only in a reproduction by Sabljar in Kukuljević's Nadpisi istranski (Arhiv HAZU, XV 23/D VI 93). Engraver: parish priest Juri Mihelić of Boljun or someone on his behalf.		(Note: ˙˙˙˙˙˙)
1556	Korte		On jars for holy oil.		
1556	Lovran (sv. Jurja)	Ⱍ Ⱇ Ⰾ Ⰵ ⰕⰖ ⰁⰡⰘ Ⱑ ⰒⰒ ⰂⰋⰜⰅⰐⰜ ⰁⰓⰐⰍⰑⰂⰋⰛ ⰈⰁⰅⰓⰮⰀ	Above the foot of the third soldier. Engraver: priest Vicenc Brnković of Beram. Ligatures: ⰕⰖ, ⰁⰓ, ⰍⰑ.		(Note: ˙˙˙˙)
1556	Lovran (sv. Jurja)	Ⱍ Ⱇ Ⰾ Ⰵ	On the heel of the third soldier.		
1556	Vinica (sv. Katarine v grado)	Ⱍ Ⱇ Ⰾ Ⰵ M Ⰳ	Engraver: possibly meštar Grgur. The inscription was only incorporated into its current building during its renovation in the 19th century.	(Note: ,)	(Note: ˙˙˙˙˙˙˙˙)
1557–05–02	Pazin (sv. Nikole)	ⰡⰀ ⰒⰒ ⰃⰓⰃⰓ ⰡⰓⰍⰑⰂⰋⰛ ⰒⰅⰘ ⰮⰑⰣ ⰮⰎⰀⰄ[Ⱆ] ⰮⰀⰞⰖ ⰐⰀ ⰎⰅⰕ ⰃⰑⰔⰒⰑⰄⰐⰋⰘ Ⱍ Ⱇ·Ⰾ·Ⰶ· ⰄⰀⰐ ·Ⰱ· ⰮⰀⰡ ⰮⰋⰔⰅⰜⰀ ⰋⰕⰀⰄⰀ ⰁⰋⰞⰅ ⰂⰒⰀⰈⰋⰐⰋ ⰂⰅⰎⰋⰍⰀ ⰮⰑⰓⰋⰡ	Engraver: priest Grgur Jarković. Ligatures: ⰃⰓ, ⰍⰑ, ⰮⰑ, ⰃⰑ, ⰒⰑ.		(Note: ˙˙˙)
1557	Draguć (sv. Elizeja)	ⰕⰑ ⰒⰋⰔⰀ ... Ⱍ Ⱇ Ⰾ Ⰶ	On the south wall. Ligatures: ⰕⰑ.		
1557	Marčenegla (sv. Petra)	Ⱍ Ⱇ Ⰾ Ⰶ	On the stone holy water bowl. Engraver: same responsible for the holy water bowl in Vrh.		
1557	Sovinjak (sv. Jurja)	Ⱍ·Ⱇ·Ⰾ·Ⰶ· ⰂⰀ ⰂⰓⰋⰮⰅ ⰆⰖ ⰒⰀⰐⰀ · ⰍⰋⰓⰋⰐⰀ ⰔⰋⰓⰑⰕⰋⰛⰀ ⰍⰋⰅ · Ⰻ ⰔⰕⰀⰓⰅⰞⰋ ⰐⰀ · ⰜⰓⰍⰂⰅⰐⰋ · ⰋⰐⰑ Ⰻ ⰂⰅⰛⰅ · ⰔⰖⰔⰅⰄ	Commemorates the construction of the belltower. Destroyed by the Irredentists on 8 May 1921, but a reproduction by Volčić survives. Ligatures: ⰂⰓ, ⰐⰑ, ⰂⰀ, ⰄⰀ, ⰛⰀ.		(Note: ˙˙˙˙˙˙˙)
1558–09–14	Lovran (sv. Jurja)	ⰂⰀ ⰋⰮⰅ ⰁⰑⰆⰋ Ⰻ ⰄⰂⰋ ⰮⰀⰓⰋⰅ ⰮⰅⰐ Ⱍ Ⱇ Ⰾ Ⰷ ⰮⰔⰜⰀ ⰔⰅⰍⰕⰅⰁⰓⰀ ⰐⰀ ⰄⰐ ⰃⰉ ⰕⰀ ⰄⰀⰐ ⰔⰅ Ⰲ +ⰎⰑⰂⰓⰐⰅ ⰡⰂⰋ ⰐⰀⰃⰎⰀ ⰔⰮⰅⰓⰕ Ⰻ ⰖⰮ ⰄⰑ Ⰾ ⰎⰖⰄⰋ	Commemorating the sudden death of up to 50 people. Ligatures: ⰄⰐ. Low resolution reproduction in Fučić.	(Note: [low res.])	(Note: ˙˙˙˙˙)
1558	Lovran (sv. Jurja)	Ⱍ Ⱇ Ⰾ Ⰷ	On the Eucharist scene.		
1558	Sali (staro groblje)	ⰕⰑⰅ ⰃⰓⰑⰁ ⰄⰑⰮⰋⰘⰑⰂ ⰋⰎⰀ ⰗⰎⰖⰓⰋⰐⰑⰂⰋⰛⰀ ⰋⰐⰅⰃⰑⰂⰋⰘ ⰑⰔⰕⰀⰎ ⰋⰘ ⰎⰅⰕ ⰁⰑⰆⰌⰋⰘ ·Ⱍ·Ⱇ·Ⰾ·Ⰷ·	Natpis na nadgrobnoj ploči u starom groblju. Originally the gravestone of don Mihovil Flurinović and his family, it was repurposed in 1878 as the gravestone of Roko Grandov, who purchased the gravestone from the church. Ligatures: ⰃⰓ.	(Note: , CH)	(Note: ˙˙˙˙˙)
1558	Beram (sv. Marije na Škrilinah, južni zid)	Ⱍ Ⱇ Ⰾ Ⰷ ⰂⰘⰂⰑ ⰋⰮⰅ ⰀⰮⰅⰐ	Uses ligature ⰘⰂⰑ.		
1558	Draguć (sv. Roka)	Ⱍ Ⱇ Ⰾ Ⰷ	On the breasts of the Theotokos on the north wall.		
1558	Draguć (sv. Roka)	Ⱍ Ⱇ Ⰾ Ⰷ	On the back of Saint Joseph on the north wall.		
1558	Draguć (sv. Roka)	Ⱍ Ⱇ Ⰾ Ⰷ	Above Saint Peter on the north wall.		
1558	Lovran (sv. Jurja)	Ⱍ Ⱇ Ⰾ Ⰷ			
1558	Ozalj (Žitnica)	Ⱍ Ⱇ Ⰾ Ⰷ	In a residential house of the Zrinski family in the old city known as Žitnica.		
1558	Pici by Zrenj	Ⱍ·Ⱇ·Ⰾ Ⰷ [Ⱓ/Ⰼ]ⰎⰀ[ⰋⰊ]Ⱀ Ⱂ[Ⰼ/Ⱓ]	On the lintel of a window of the Rosić house. During the renovation of the house around 1950, the stone was used in the construction of a new wall. A transcription by the parish priest Luigi Parentin survives.		
1558	Žunovec (sv. Petra)	Ⱍ Ⱇ Ⰾ Ⰶ	First written about by Ivan Komelj, but his work Topografsko gradivo umetnostnih spomenikov na območju občine Trebnja remained in manuscript, kept at the Arhiv Regonalnog zavoda za spomeniško varstvo in Ljubljana.		
1559	Lovran (sv. Jurja)	Ⱍ Ⱇ Ⰾ Ⰸ			
1559	Lindar (sv. Sebastijana i Fabijana)	☩IOHES·IEDR[ECICH]... IN HONOREM·DEI; E S SEBAST[IANI DEVOTI]ONIS·F·F·ANNO ☩ DNI·[M D L I X] ☩ ⰋⰂⰀⰐⰬ·Ⱑ[ⰄⰓⰅⰋⰝⰋⰛⰬ] ...ⰂⰑ ☩ ⰂⰀ ⰋⰮⰅ ☩ ⰁⰑⰆⰋⰅ·ⰋⰔⰂⰅⰕ[ⰑⰃⰀ ⰞⰅⰁⰀⰔⰕ]ⰡⰐⰀ·Ⰻ ⰑⰂⰑ☩ ⰈⰀⰂⰅⰛⰀⰐⰅ·Ⰲ[...ⰖⰝⰋ]ⰐⰋⰕ ☩ Ⱍ·Ⱇ·Ⰾ·Ⰸ	On the façade. Engraver: Ivan Jedrejčić. The bell chain wore out the centre of the inscription.		(Note: ˙˙˙˙˙˙˙)
1559	Šumber		On the old church lintel, secondarily used as a floor tile beneath the porch of the parish church.		
1550s?	Mošćenice	[Ⱍ?] Ⱇ Ⰾ Ⱃ ...	Discovered by parish priest Viktor Perkan in the garden of the parish priest's house (specifically "zdola šterne"). Perkan incorporated it into the wall of the sacristy but it has since been lost, surviving only in a reproduction he made, kept in the parish office in Mošćenice (in the Kronika župe i grada on pagre 76), lithographed in Fučić 1982. It is a fragment, so the Ⱇ Ⰾ could be part of a date Ⱍ Ⱇ Ⰾ "1550", but despite Perkan's belief that the date "1552" was intended, that would require Ⰱ and not Ⱃ, and Perkan also noted traces of another letter after Ⱃ.		

== 1560–1579 ==
Date	Place	Transcription	Name and Notes	Images	Sources
1560 (April 30)	Borut (sv. Duha)	Ⱍ Ⱇ Ⰼ ⰀⰂⰓⰋⰎⰀ ⰄⰀⰐ Ⰼ 1560 ⰂⰂⰓⰋⰮⰅ ⰃⰄⰐⰀ ⰀⰄⰀⰮⰀ ...Ⰰ Ⱑ ⰂⰋⰄ ⰂⰋⰕⰖⰎⰑⰂⰋⰛ ⰑⰓ ⰄⰋⰐⰀⰂⰀⰮ ⰮⰑⰋⰮ ⰔⰋⰮ ⰋⰒⰑ ⰐⰋⰘ ⰔⰅⰮ ⰓⰕⰋ ⰮⰑⰮⰖ ⰓⰅⰄⰖ ⰄⰀ ⰃⰖⰂⰅⰓⰐⰀⰣ ⰕⰖ ⰜⰓⰅⰍⰀⰂⰬ ⰋⰑⰎⰕⰀⰓ ⰔⰮⰀⰓⰋⰅ Ⰽ[Ⰰ Ⰵ] Ⰲ ⰜⰓⰅⰍⰂⰋ ⰔⰬ ⰮⰋⰘⰑⰂⰎⰀ ⰀⰕⰑ ⰍⰋ ⰁⰖⰄⰅ ⰄⰓⰆⰀⰎ ⰮⰑⰅ ⰁⰎⰀⰃⰑ· ⰁⰋ ⰮⰅⰞⰕⰀⰓ ⰣⰓⰋ ⰞⰂⰑⰓⰜ ⰋⰕⰑⰮⰀ ⰎⰀⰓⰖⰕⰋⰐ ⰈⰃⰑⰓⰜ ⰋⰂⰕⰑ ⰂⰓⰋⰮⰅ ⰁⰋⰞⰅ ⰒⰓⰀ ⰐⰕⰑⰐ ⰍⰖⰓⰅⰎⰋⰛ ⰒⰎⰑⰂⰀⰐ Ⰱ[ⰑⰓⰖⰕⰔⰍⰋ]	In commemoration of the construction of the Crkva Svetoga Duha. Engraver: Anton Kurelić parish priest of Borut on behalf of Vid Vitulović, or Vid Vitulović himself. Commemorates the construction of the church. Ligatures: ⰂⰓ, ⰃⰄ, ⰖⰎ, ⰒⰑ, ⰕⰋ, ⰮⰑ, ⰮⰖ, ⰃⰖ, ⰕⰑ, ⰑⰎⰕ, ⰘⰑ, ⰁⰖ, ⰆⰀⰎ, ⰁⰎ, ⰃⰑ, ⰞⰕ, ⰕⰋ, ⰂⰕⰑ, ⰒⰓ, ⰍⰖ, ⰐⰀ, ⰄⰀ, ⰮⰀ, ⰂⰀ, ⰕⰀ, ⰮⰋ, ⰀⰕ, ⰎⰀ. Reproductions are kept in various libraries: Volčić's in Rijeka (Trezor Naučne biblioteke), Spinčić's in Zagreb (Arhiv HAZU VIII-161).		(Note: ˙˙˙˙˙˙˙˙)
1560–07–04	Barban (sv. Antuna, sjeverni zid)	ⱍ ⱇ ⱞ ⱅ𞀑 ⱂⰻⱄⰰ ⰾ𞀑ⰲⱃⰵ ⱞⰰⰾⰻⱋ ⱀⰰ... ⱞⰻⱄⰵⱌⰰ ⱓⰾⰵⰼⰰ ⰳ	Engraver: Lovre Malić. Ligatures: ⰕⰑ, ⰎⰑ.		
1560	Lovran (sv. Jurja)	Ⱍ Ⱇ Ⱞ			
1561–10–14	Rijeka (kuća br. 16)	☩ 1561 · DIE ·14·MENSIS OCTOBRIS ·MAGISTER· GASPARVS MVRATOR VNA CVM EIVS VXORE BARBARA HOC; OPVS PERFECIT MANV·PROPRIA. QVI DEO AGVNT GRATIAS ·Ⱍ·Ⱇ·Ⱞ·Ⰰ·	Only second date is Glagolitic. Originally located on the upper threshold of the window of the now ruined Vičević house in Rijeka (br. 16), on the street leading from the old "gradska ura" to the Crkva sv. Vida. The house was opposite the likewise ruined Jesuit college. Today it is kept in the lapidarium of the Pomorski i povijesni muzej.	(Note: LP (22 February 2013), Adamić (14 October 2021),)	(Note: ˙˙˙˙)
1561	Beram (sv. Marije na Škrilinah, sjeverni zid)	Ⱍ Ⱇ Ⱞ Ⰰ ⰍⰀ	Unfinished commemoration of an event.		
1561	Brseč (kuća br. 34)	☩ Ⱍ Ⱇ ⰮⰀ	Originally on the lintel of some older house, later built into the present house.		
1561	Draguć (sv. Roka)	Ⱍ Ⱇ Ⱞ Ⰰ ⰄⰀ ⰖⰂⰅⰎⰋ ⰁⰋⰞⰅ	On the north wall	.	
1561	Draguć (sv. Roka)	Ⱍ Ⱇ Ⱂ Ⰲ	On the north wall.		
1561	Hrastovlje (sv. Trojstva)	Ⱍ·Ⱇ·Ⱞ·Ⰰ·ⰕⰑ ⰔⰖ ⰮⰀⰞⰅ ⰑⰎⰕⰀⰓⰀ ⰔⰂⰅⰕⰅⰃⰀ ⰁⰀⰞⰕⰋⰐⰀ			
1561	Hrastovlje (sv. Trojstva)	Ⱍ Ⱇ Ⱞ Ⰰ ⰕⰑ ⰔⰖ ⰮⰀⰞⰅ ⰑⰎⰕⰀⰓⰀ ⰕⰓⰋⰘ ⰍⰓⰀⰎⰋ			
1562–08–22	Hum	·Ⱍ·Ⱇ·Ⱞ·Ⰱ ⰮⰜⰀ ⰀⰂⰕⰀ ⰄⰐ ⰋⰁ·ⰂⰓⰮⰅ ⰆⰒⰐⰀ ⰀⰐⰓⰅⰡ Ⱞ ⰀⰎⰛⰀ ⰋⰒⰓⰮⰖⰆ_{Ⰻ}	Above the city gate. Ligatures: ⰄⰐ, ⰂⰕ, ⰐⰀ, ⰮⰖ. First transcribed by Jakov Volčić. Destroyed in 1921 on the orders of the Italian administration in Buzet. But a reproduction by Volčić and a photograph owned by Milčetić at Arhiv HAZU designated VIII-135 survived.		(Note: ˙˙˙)
1562	Draguć (sv. Roka)	Ⱍ Ⱇ Ⱞ Ⰱ ⰒⰋⰔⰀ ⰆⰀⰍⰀⰐ ...	On the west wall. Engraver: a deacon.		
1563–08–06	Draguć (sv. Elizeja)	Ⱍ Ⱇ Ⱞ Ⰲ ⰀⰂⰃⰖⰔⰕⰀ Ⰵ ⰒⰓⰅⰮⰋⰐⰖ ⰒⰑⰒ ⰀⰐⰕⰑⰐ ⰍⰖⰓⰅⰎⰋⰛ. ⰒⰋⰔⰀ ⰒⰑⰒ ⰣⰓⰅ ⰃⰎⰀⰂⰋⰐⰋⰛ	On the triumphal arch. Engraver: priest Jure Glavinić. Ligatures: ⰒⰓ, ⰒⰑ, ⰣⰓ, ⰃⰎ, ⰕⰀ.		
1563 (pust na viliju Matinje)	Draguć (sv. Roka)	Ⱍ Ⱇ Ⱞ Ⰲ ⰍⰀⰄⰀ ⰁⰋⰞⰅ ⰒⰖⰔⰕ ⰐⰀ ⰂⰋⰎⰋⰣ ⰮⰀⰕⰋⰐⰅ ⰐⰀ ⰒⰖⰔ Ⱍ Ⱇ Ⱞ Ⰲ	On the west wall. Made during lent. Ligatures: ⰒⰖ, ⰐⰀ.		
1563	Beram (sv. Marije na Škrilinah, južni zid)	Ⱍ Ⱇ Ⱞ Ⰲ ⰮⰋⰔⰅⰜⰀ			
1563	Draguć (sv. Roka)	Ⱍ Ⱇ Ⱞ Ⰲ ⰍⰀⰄⰀ ⰒⰓⰅⰮⰋⰐⰖ Ⱂ[...ⰒⰀⰛⰅⰎ]ⰀⰕ	On the west wall. Ligatures: ⰒⰓ.		
1563	Draguć (sv. Roka)	Ⱍ Ⱇ Ⱞ Ⰴ ⰔⰋⰅ ⰒⰋⰔⰀ Ⱑ ⰋⰂⰀⰐ ⰣⰓⰋⰞⰅⰂⰋⰛ Ⱄ ⰍⰓⰋⰂⰋ...	On the west wall. Engraver: Ivan Jurišević Ligatures: ⰣⰓ.		
1563	Novaki Motovunski		Engraver: priest Frane Pengar.		
1563	Sali (Rakarova kuća u Južnjem selu)		Natpis na Rakarovoj kući. Strgačić transliterated it into Latinic, so the original form of the inscription was unknown as of Grbin 1981, because it was covered by a facade.		(Note: ˙˙)
1564–09–27	Zanigrad (sv. Stjepana)	Ⱍ Ⱇ Ⱞ Ⰳ ⰮⰋⰔⰋⰜⰀ ⰔⰋⰍⰕⰅⰁⰓ ⰐⰀ ⰄⰀⰐ ⰋⰆ ⰕⰑ ⰒⰋⰔⰀ ⰒⰑⰒ ⰒⰀⰂⰀⰎ	Ligatures: ⰕⰑ, ⰒⰑ, ⰐⰀ, ⰔⰀ, ⰒⰀⰂ. Engraver: pop Paval.		
1564	Draguć (sv. Roka)	Ⱍ Ⱇ Ⱞ Ⰳ ⰍⰀⰄⰀ ⰋⰄⰅ ⰒⰓⰅ ⰌⰅⰓⰑⰎⰮ ⰃⰓⰃⰖⰓⰑⰂⰋⰛ ⰈⰄⰓⰀⰃⰖⰛⰀ ⰐⰀⰃⰓⰋⰮⰀⰎⰄⰀ ⰈⰀⰒⰎⰑⰂⰀⰐⰀ ⰕⰀⰄⰀ ⰁⰋⰞⰅ ⰎⰀⰝⰐ ⰒⰞⰅⰐⰋⰝⰐⰅⰃⰀ ⰘⰓⰖⰘⰀ Ⰰ ⰕⰑ... ⰔⰋⰓⰝⰅⰐⰅⰃⰀ Ⰸ ⰁⰑⰆⰣ ⰂⰑⰎⰖ ⰍⰑⰋ ... ⰈⰃⰑⰓⰀ ...	On the south wall. Engraver: priest Jerolim Grgurović. Ligatures: ⰒⰓ, ⰃⰓ, ⰖⰓ, ⰒⰎ, ⰑⰂ, ⰕⰑ, ⰑⰆⰣ, ⰍⰑ, ⰃⰑ, ⰄⰀ, ⰃⰀ.		
1564	Grimalda	ⰒⰓⰅ ⰬⰅⰓⰑⰎⰋⰮ ⰃⰓⰃⰖⰓⰅⰂⰋⰛ ⰈⰄⰓⰀⰃⰖⰛⰀ	Engraver: parish priest Jerolum Grgurević.		
1564	Lanišće		Engravers: priests Frane Pengar and Jure Pengar Bolzećanin.		
1564	Vranja (sv. Petra)	Ⱍ Ⱇ Ⱞ Ⰳ ⰌⰀ ⰋⰂⰀⰐ ⰜⰋⰎⰅⰓ ⰑⰄ ⰃⰑⰓⰋⰜ Ⱅ... ⰒⰋⰔⰀⰘ ⰕⰑ	Engraver: Ivan Ciler of Gorica. Ligatures: ⰃⰑ, ⰕⰑ, ⰂⰀⰐ.		
1564	Vremski Britof (sv. Marije)	ⰕⰑ ⰒⰋⰔⰀ ⰃⰓⰅⰃⰑⰓ ⰞⰋⰐⰄⰎⰅⰓ Ⱍ·Ⱇ·Ⱞ·Ⰳ	Engraver: Gregor Šindler. Ligatures: ⰕⰑ, ⰃⰓ, ⰃⰑ.		
1564	Zaglav (sv. Mihovila)	Ⱍ·Ⱇ·Ⱞ·Ⰳ·ⰕⰑ Ⰵ ⰃⰓⰑⰁ ⰗⰓⰕⰓⰔⰍⰋ	Gravestone of the brothers.		
1565–05–12	Draguć (sv. Roka)	Ⱍ Ⱇ Ⱞ Ⰴ ⰂⰕⰑ ⰂⰓⰋⰮⰅ ⰁⰅ ⰔⰕⰑⰓⰅⰐⰀ ⰕⰀ ⰍⰓⰑⰂ ⰒⰓⰅⰄ ⰕⰖ ⰜⰓⰅⰍⰂⰖ ⰮⰀⰡ ⰐⰀ ⰁⰉ ⰓⰀⰔⰕ[Ⱁ]ⰝⰋ ⰋⰓⰀⰈⰄⰀ ⰖⰁⰑⰃⰋⰮⰬ ⰔⰕⰀⰓⰅⰞⰋⰐⰀ ⰁⰅⰐⰅ ⰃⰓⰑⰈⰋⰛ	Painted on the wall, commemorating the construction of the porch. Low resolution reproduction in Fučić 1982. Ligatures: ⰂⰕ, ⰂⰓ, ⰒⰓ, ⰈⰄ, ⰃⰓ, ⰕⰀ, ⰁⰉ, ⰓⰀ, ⰄⰀ, ⰐⰀ.		
1565–10–31	Beram (sv. Marije na Škrilinah, južni zid)	Ⱍ Ⱇ Ⱞ Ⰴ ⰮⰅⰔⰅⰜⰀ ⰑⰕⰖⰁⰋⰌⰀ ⰌⰀ ⰄⰐ			
1565	Beram (sv. Marije na Škrilinah, južni zid)	Ⱍ Ⱇ Ⱞ Ⰴ ⰮⰋⰔⰅⰜⰀ			
1565	Vranja (sv. Petra)	ⰕⰑ ... Ⱍ Ⱇ Ⱞ Ⰴ			
1565	Vrbnik (sv. Marije)	ⰂⰋⰮⰅ ⰁⰆ ⰋⰅ ⰀⰮⰅⰐ ·Ⱍ·Ⱇ·Ⱞ·Ⰴ 1·565· ⰕⰑⰅ ⰃⰓⰑⰁ ⰍⰀⰄⰋ ⰒⰑⰝⰋⰂⰀ ⰕⰅⰎⰑ ⰒⰑⰒⰀ ⰁⰀⰓⰋⰛⰀ ⰁⰑ ⰈⰀⰐⰋⰛⰀ ⰍⰑⰮⰖ ⰒⰓⰋⰘⰑⰄ ⰐⰀ ⰁⰉ ⰄⰅⰜⰮ ⰁⰀ ⰐⰀ Ⱅ ⰃⰑⰄ ⰋⰮⰀⰣ ⰒⰑⰒⰋ ⰕⰑ ⰕⰅⰎⰑ ⰖⰍⰓⰑⰒⰋⰕ	On the gravestone of priest Barić Bozanić. Ligatures: ⰕⰑ, ⰃⰓ, ⰒⰑ, ⰁⰑ, ⰍⰑ, ⰒⰓ, ⰘⰑ, ⰓⰑ, ⰁⰉ. In the chapel next to the parish church of Uznesenja BDM.		
1566	Beram (sv. Marije na Škrilinah, južni zid)	Ⱍ Ⱇ Ⱞ Ⰵ ⰍⰀⰄⰀ Ⱑ ⰒⰑⰒ ⰣⰓⰀⰋ ⰁⰀⰄⰀⰐⰑⰂⰋⰛ ⰓⰅⰍⰘ ⰮⰑⰣ ⰮⰎⰀⰄⰖ ⰮⰋⰔⰖ	Engraver: priest Juraj Badanović. Ligatures: ⰣⰓ, ⰄⰑⰂ.		
1566	Contovello (Maria della Salvia)	ⰎⰅⰂⰀⰜ ⰍⰓⰋⰆⰀⰐⰋⰛ ⰒⰓⰅⰑⰞⰕ ⰒⰀⰈⰋⰐⰀ Ⱍ Ⱇ Ⱞ Ⰵ	Engraver: Levac Križanić preošt of Pazin. Ligatures: ⰒⰓ, ⰆⰀⰐ, ⰒⰀⰈ, ⰐⰀ. The same scribe was responsible for a 1533 graffito in Beram, without a priestly title. In 1546 he was a clergyman in Žminj and Tinjan during the verification of a copy of the Istrian Demarcation.		
1566	Lovran (sv. Jurja)	Ⱍ Ⱇ Ⱞ Ⰵ			
1566	Paz (sv. Vida)	Ⱍ Ⱇ Ⱞ Ⰵ ⰒⰋⰔⰀ ⰎⰖⰍⰀ Ⱞ[ⰀⰕⰋⰡⰞⰋⰛ] ⰈⰁⰑⰎⰖⰐⰀ ⰔⰋⰐ ⰌⰖⰓⰡ ⰮⰀⰕⰋⰡⰞ[ⰋⰛⰀ] ⰍⰋ ⰔⰕⰀⰞⰅ ⰒⰑⰎⰋ [ⰒⰓⰅ?] ⰮⰀⰓⰕⰋⰐⰀ ⰈⰁⰑⰎⰖ[ⰐⰀ Ⰲ]ⰅⰎⰅ ⰄⰑⰁⰓⰑⰃⰀ ⰓⰅⰄⰑⰂ[ⰐⰋ]ⰍⰀ	Engraver: Luka Matijašić of Boljun son of Juraj.		
1566	Vranja (sv. Petra)	Ⱍ Ⱇ Ⱞ... Ⰾ... ⰂⰈⰅⰞⰅ ...Ⰽ ⰜⰅⰓⰅ ⰁⰀⰐⰀ ... ⰈⰓⰅⰐⰔⰍⰑⰃⰀ Ⰻ ...ⰛⰀ ...Ⱈ ⰒⰑⰮⰋⰎⰌ ⰕⰑ ⰒⰋⰔⰀⰘ ...	Likely commemorates the Fall of Siget in 1566 and the death of Nikola Zrinski. Ligatures: ⰈⰓ, ⰍⰑ, ⰒⰑ, ⰋⰎ, ⰕⰑ.		
1567–05–20	Pridvor (sv. Antuna)	Ⱍ Ⱇ Ⱞ Ⰶ ⰮⰋⰔⰅⰜⰀ ⰮⰀⰡ ⰐⰀ Ⰻ ⰄⰀⰐ ⰁⰋ [Ⱄ] ⰂⰓⰞⰅⰐⰬ ⰔⰋ ⰘⰓⰀⰮ ⰒⰑ ⰮⰅⰞ[ⰕⰓⰋ] ⰒⰀⰂⰎⰋ ⰍⰑⰐⰜⰋ ⰋⰒⰑⰄ ⰔⰕⰀ[ⰓⰅⰞⰋⰐ] ⰖⰀⰐⰕⰐⰑⰮ ⰃⰓⰃⰖⰓⰋⰛⰅⰮ	Engraver: possibly master Paval Konec. Ligatures: ⰒⰑ, ⰄⰀ, ⰒⰀⰂ, ⰎⰋ, ⰑⰄ, ⰕⰀ, ⰃⰓ, ⰓⰋ. Extracted from the steps in 1965 and built into the eastern wall of the sacristy.		
1567 (July 20, 23)	Muggia (Santa Maria Assunta)	1567; Die XX 7O; HIC FUIT ⰒⰒⰕ_{IA} C,M, A.M, Die; 23 7bras Ⱂ	On the last right pillar, facing the outer wall. Engraver: priest T. or P.T.		(Note: ˙˙˙˙˙)
1567	Dekani (sv. Anton)		Above the door, dating the construction of the church. Now in the sacristy.		
1567	Gologorica (sv. Marije)	Ⱍ Ⱇ Ⱞ Ⰶ ⰍⰀⰄⰀ ⰂⰈ[Ⰵ...]Ⰰ ⰂⰔ[Ⱆ] ⰕⰖ ⰍⰖⰐⰕⰓⰀⰄⰖ	Commemorates a hail event in the Gologorica area. Ligatures: ⰕⰖ, ⰍⰖ, ⰕⰓ, ⰍⰀ, ⰀⰄ, ⰕⰓ.		
1567	Kraj (sv. Jeronima)	·Ⱍ·Ⱇ·Ⱞ·Ⰶ ... ⰞⰋⰮⰖⰐⰀ ⰄⰓⰀⰃⰐ...	Engraver: Šimun Draganić. Ligatures: ⰮⰖ. More of the inscription might be underneath the altar.		
1567	Zadar (sv. Mihovila)	·Ⱍ·Ⱇ·Ⱞ·Ⰶ· ⰃⰓⰑⰁ·ⰮⰀⰓⰕⰐⰀ ·ⰓⰀⰄⰎⰂⰋⰛⰀ ⰋⰐⰅ ⰃⰀ ⰓⰄⰀ	Gravestone of Martin Radulović.	(Note: , CH)	
1568	Dobrinj (sv. Stjepana)	ⰝⰗⰮⰇ	On a lintel.		
1568	Dolenja Vas (sv. Marije)	Ⱍ Ⱇ Ⱞ Ⰷ ⰮⰀⰕⰋⰌ ⰒⰎⰋⰂⰀⰝⰋⰛ ⰒⰋⰔⰀ	Engraver: Matij Plivačić. Ligatures: ⰁⰑ, ⰒⰑ, ⰖⰂ (the ⰂⰖ ligature with the phonetic value /uv/).		
1568	Kastav (župna kuća)	Ⱍ.Ⱇ.Ⱞ.Ⰷ	Originally on the lintel of the door of the parish priest's house. Now lost, but a reproduction by Mijat Sabljar survives.		
1568	Selina (sv. Lucije)	Ⱍ Ⱇ Ⱞ Ⰷ	On the custody in the church.		(Note: ˙˙˙˙˙)
1568	Sorbar (sv. Petra)	Ⱍ Ⱇ Ⱞ Ⰷ ⰒⰓⰅ ⰅⰄⰓⰋⰅ ⰣⰓⰍⰂⰋⰛ ⰒⰋⰔⰘ ⰍⰄⰀ ⰁⰋⰞⰅ ⰔⰐⰋⰃ ⰐⰀⰂ... ⰋⰁⰋⰞⰅ ⰮⰀⰞⰀ Ⱆ...	Engraver: pre Jadrij Jurković.		
1569	Gradinje (Svih svetih)	Ⱍ Ⱇ Ⱞ Ⰸ ⰑⰂⰑ ⰒⰋⰔ			
1569	Ozalj (Žitnica)	[Ⱍ] Ⱇ Ⱞ Ⰸ ⰂⰀ ⰕⰑ ⰂⰓⰋⰮⰅ	In a residential house of the Zrinski family in the old city known as Žitnica. Ligatures: ⰂⰀ, ⰕⰑ, ⰂⰓ.		
1569	Pićan (sv. Mihovila na groblju)	ⰒⰑⰒ ⰮⰀⰓⰕⰋⰐ ⰁⰓ... Ⱍ Ⱇ Ⱞ Ⰸ	Engraver: pop Martin Brajša. Ligatures: ⰒⰑ, ⰁⰓ.		
1569	Vrbnik (sv. Ivana Krstitelja)	Ⱞ Ⰽ Ⰾ Ⰰ Ⱈ Ⱀ Ⱎ Ⰳ Ⱞ	Capital I. Discovered in 1969 during the exhumation of the old graveyard.	(Note: [low res.])	
1569	Vrbnik (sv. Ivana Krstitelja)	Ⱞ[ⰅⰞⰕⰀⰓ] Ⰻ[ⰂⰀⰐ] [Ⰱ/Ⱂ]...	Capital II. Discovered in 1969 during the exhumation of the old graveyard.		
1560s	Hrastovlje (sv. Trojstva)	Ⱍ [Ⱇ] Ⱞ ? ⰕⰑ Ⱂ[Ⰻ]ⰔⰀ ⰍⰋ Ⰲ[Ⱁ]ⰎⰋ ⰒⰓ ⰮⰋⰈⰋ ⰔⰋⰄⰅⰜ ⰂⰋⰐⰑ ⰒⰋⰕⰋ ⰐⰅⰃⰑ ⰍⰑⰒⰀⰕⰋ Ⰻ ⰍⰋ ⰂⰑⰎⰋ ⰂⰋⰐⰑ ⰐⰅⰃⰑ ⰍⰓⰑⰒ ⰍⰋ ⰕⰑ ⰒⰋⰔⰀ ⰁⰑⰃ ⰮⰖ ⰒⰑⰮⰑⰈⰋ Ⰻ ⰔⰂⰅⰕⰀ ⰮⰀⰓⰋⰡ ⰀⰮⰅⰐ ⰂⰔⰀⰍⰋ ⰓⰅⰜⰋ ⰍⰋ ⰕⰑ ⰞⰕⰀⰎ ⰁⰖⰄⰅ ⰁⰑⰃ ⰮⰖ ⰒⰑⰮⰑⰈⰋ Ⰻ ⰜⰅⰕⰅⰓⰀ ⰂⰓⰀⰃⰖ ⰐⰀ ⰓⰀⰮⰅ			
1570	Beram (sv. Marije na Škrilinah, južni zid)	Ⱍ Ⱇ Ⱀ ⰕⰖ ⰁⰋⰘ ⰌⰀ	Uses ligature ⰕⰖ.		
1570	Drivenik Castle	Ⱍ Ⱇ Ⱀ ⰕⰀⰄⰀ ⰒⰑⰔⰕⰂⰋ ⰕⰀ ⰂⰓ [ⰀⰕ]Ⰰ ⰋⰂⰀⰐ ⰮⰀⰕⰅⰕⰋⰛ	Commemorates the construction of a new gate through the walls of the Drivenik fortress. Now kept at Hrvatski povijesni muzej in Zagreb (as 6842). It was brought there by Mijat Sabljar according to Laszowski though the date is incorrectly cited as 1572. Sabljar discovered the inscription at a former guard house between the fortress and the church, but it was originally at the gates of the fortress. Ligatures: ⰒⰑ, ⰕⰀⰂ, ⰂⰓ, ⰂⰀ, ⰮⰀⰕ.		(Note: ˙˙˙˙˙˙˙)
1570	Hrastovlje (sv. Trojstva)	Ⱍ·Ⱇ·Ⱀ· ⰕⰑ ⰒⰋⰔⰀ ⰒⰓⰅ ⰀⰐⰕⰑⰐ ⰔⰂⰅⰕⰋⰐⰀ ⰍⰀⰄⰀ ⰁⰋⰘ ⰍⰀⰒⰅⰎⰀⰐ	Engraver: chaplain Anton Svetina.		
1570	Hrastovlje (sv. Trojstva)	ⰂⰀⰋⰮⰅ ⰁⰑⰆⰅ ⰕⰅⰜⰋⰞⰅ ⰎⰅⰕ ⰃⰑⰘ ·Ⱍ·Ⱇ·Ⱀ· ⰄⰀⰁⰅ ⰒⰞⰅ ⰒⰑ ⰔⰕⰀⰓ ⰎⰁⰓ ⰍⰇ ⰋⰁⰋⰞⰅ ⰖⰐⰝⰀ ⰍⰓⰖⰘⰀ ⰔⰀⰍⰀ ⰈⰀⰔⰑⰎⰄ ⰋⰁⰋⰞⰅ ⰂⰅⰎⰋⰍⰀ ⰍⰀⰓⰅⰞⰕⰋⰡ			
1570	Jablanica (sv. Marije Snežne)	ⰒⰋⰔⰘ Ⱑ ⰒⰀⰂ ⰎⰅ ⰝⰋⰍⰀⰄⰋⰛ Ⱍ Ⱇ Ⱀ	Engraver: Pavle Čikadić.		
1570	Lovran (Stari grad 60)	Ⱑ J [Ⰽ?]Ⱀ 1 5 7 0	On the lintel of the house on the parcel with local cadastral number 40. Discovered and photographed by Željko Bistrović of Rijeka during a conservatory inspection.		
1570?	Kanfanar (sv. Antona)	ⰀⰓⰁⰀⰐⰀ ? Ⱍ Ⱇ [Ⱀ]... ⰈⰁⰓⰋⰁⰋⰓⰀ Ⱍ ? ...	One of the newly discovered graffitos. Ligatures: ⰁⰓ.		
1571 (April 5)	Pićan (sv. Mihovila na groblju)	Ⱍ Ⱇ Ⱀ Ⰰ Ⰴ ⰄⰐ ⰀⰒⰓⰋⰎⰀ	Ligatures: ⰒⰓ.		
1571	Beram (sv. Marije na Škrilinah, sjeverni zid)	Ⱍ Ⱇ Ⱀ Ⰰ			
1571	Drivenik			Unreadable.	
1571	Puče (sv. Marije od Karmela)	·Ⱍ·Ⱇ·Ⱀ Ⰰ ⰂⰀⰕⰑ ⰂⰓⰋⰮ Ⰵ ⰁⰋ ⰔⰂⰓⰞⰅⰐ ⰕⰀ ⰕⰅ ⰒⰀⰎ ⰒⰑⰄ ⰔⰕⰀⰓⰅⰞⰋⰐⰖ ⰕⰑⰐⰜⰅⰮ ⰒⰖⰝⰀⰓⰑⰮ	Commemorates the construction of the church. Ligatures: ⰒⰑ, ⰕⰑ, ⰒⰖ, ⰕⰀ, ⰅⰮ. Originally in the church but during a renovation it was taken out and built into the grveyard wall, to the right of the entrance.	(Note: , Matičetov (1950, online 2014))	
1572–02–24	Kršikla (sv. Kuzme i Damjana)	ⰂⰀⰋⰮⰅ ⰁⰑⰆⰅ ⰀⰮⰅⰐ ⰎⰅⰕ ⰃⰔⰘ Ⱍ Ⱇ Ⱀ Ⰱ ⰮⰋⰔⰅⰜⰀ ⰒⰅⰓⰂⰀ ⰄⰀⰐ Ⰻ Ⰻ Ⰳ ⰕⰑⰅ ⰃⰓⰑⰁ Ⰶ ⰖⰒⰀⰐⰀ ⰮⰀⰓ ⰕⰋⰐⰀ ⰍⰋⰔⰋⰛⰀ<r>ⰝⰋⰐⰣ ⰒⰋⰔⰀⰕⰋ ⰕⰑⰮⰀⰞ ⰍⰔⰛ ⰔⰋ Ⱀ ⰐⰅⰃⰀ	On the gravestone of župan Martin Kisić. Engraver: Tomaš Kisić son of Martin. Ligatures: ⰕⰑ. Now at the Gliptoteka HAZU (inv. br. HZ-426).	(Note: ,)	
1572–02–25	Kršikla (sv. Kuzme i Damjana)	ⰂⰀ ⰋⰮⰅ ⰁⰑⰆⰅ ⰀⰮ ⰅⰐ ⰎⰅⰕ ⰃⰐⰋⰘ Ⱍ Ⱇ Ⱀ Ⰱ ⰮⰋⰔⰅ[Ⱌ] Ⰰ ⰒⰅⰓⰂⰀⰓA ⰄⰀ Ⱀ Ⰻ Ⰻ Ⰴ ⰕⰑⰅ ⰞⰍⰓⰋ ⰎⰀ ⰃⰓⰃꙋⰓⰀ ⰒⰅⰕ ⰓⰑⰂⰋⰛⰀ ⰂⰀ ⰕⰑ ⰂⰓⰋⰮⰅ ⰁⰋⰞⰅ Ⰲ ⰑⰋⰔⰍⰀ Ⰻ Ⰵ Ⰰ Ⱄ ⰒⰓ Ⱂ ⰁⰓ	Gravestone of soldier Grgur Petrović. Ligatures: ⰒⰓ, ⰁⰓ. Discovered around 1880 by Jakov Volčić. Since lost, likely during repairs. Survives in a reproduction by Volčić.		
1572	Dvigrad (sv. Marije od Lokvića)	Ⱍ Ⱇ Ⱀ Ⰱ ⰔⰋⰅ ⰒⰔ ⰖⰓⰁⰀⰐ Ⱃ... ⰋⰈ . Ⰰ	Engraver: Urban R. Low quality reproduction in Fučić 1982.		
1572	Dvigrad (sv. Marije od Lokvića)	ⰑⰂⰄⰅ ⰒⰋⰔⰀ ⰒⰑⰒ ⰋⰂⰀⰐ ⰒⰅⰐⰃⰀⰓⰬ ⰋⰈⰁⰖⰈⰅⰕⰀ ·Ⱍ·Ⱇ·Ⱀ·Ⰱ·	Engraver: priest Ivan Pengar of Buzet. Ligatures: ⰂⰄ, ⰒⰑ, ⰂⰀ, ⰃⰀ, ⰕⰀ.		
1572	Grobnik (sv. Filipa i Jakova)	·1·5·☩·7·2· Ⰲ ⰋⰮⰅ ⰁⰑⰆⰋⰅ ⰋⰄⰅⰂⰋ ⰮⰀⰓⰋⰅ ⰀⰮⰐ ⰎⰅⰕ ??ⰋⰘ·Ⱍ̃·Ⱇ̃·Ⱀ̃·Ⰱ̃ ⰕⰀ ⰈⰂⰑⰐⰋⰍ ⰁⰋ ⰒⰑⰝⰅⰕ	On the belltower, commemorating the beginning of its construction. Ligatures: ⰘⰂ, ⰈⰂ, ⰒⰑ.	(Note: , LP (24 April 1960, online 13 May 2013), LP (2013-06))	(Note: ˙˙˙˙)
1572–1577	Grobnik (sv. Filipa i Jakova)	ⰂⰀⰓⰋⰮⰅⰈⰮⰑⰆⰐⰅⰃⰄⰅⰍⰐⰈⰀ Ⱎ̃ Ⱇ̃ Ⰽ̃ Ⱄ̃ Ⱞ̃ ⰋⰂⰀⰓⰋⰮⰅ ?ⰌⰀⰈⰓⰋⰐⰔⰍⰑⰃⰀⰋⰐⰅⰃⰀⰮ ⰁⰓⰀⰕⰌⰅ ⰍⰋⰈⰀⰅⰄⰐⰑⰔⰖⰄⰑⰂⰀ ⰘⰖ	Discovered in the middle of 1995. Ligatures: ⰃⰄ, ⰈⰀ, ⰈⰓ, ⰁⰓ, ⰄⰐ, ⰄⰑ.	(Note: LP (2013-06), replica)	(Note: ˙˙)
1572	Kanfanar (sv. Marije od Lakuća)	ⰑⰂⰄⰅ ⰒⰋⰔⰀ ⰒⰑⰒ ⰋⰂⰀⰐ ⰒⰓⰅⰐⰃⰀⰓⰬ ⰋⰈ ⰁⰖ[ⰈⰅ]ⰕⰀ ·Ⱍ·Ⱇ·Ⱀ·Ⰱ·	One of the newly discovered graffitos. Ligatures: ⰂⰄ, ⰒⰑ, ⰂⰀ, ⰒⰓ, ⰃⰀⰓ.		
1572	Prnjani by Barban (sv. Margarete)	Ⱍ Ⱇ Ⱀ Ⰱ			
1573–01–03	Boršt (sv. Roka)	ⰝⰗⰐⰂ ⰮⰋⰔⰅⰜⰀ ⰒⰓⰂⰀⰓⰀ ⰐⰀ Ⰲ ⰄⰐⰋ ⰕⰀⰄⰀ ⰖⰮⰓⰋ ⰋⰂⰀⰐ ⰞⰖⰒⰝⰋⰛ	Ligatures: ⰒⰓ, ⰐⰀ, ⰀⰄⰀ, ⰂⰀ. Reproduction in Mader 1994 but low quality in 2016 scan.		(Note: ˙˙˙)
1573-12	Mošćenička Draga (sv. Petra)	Ⱍ · Ⱇ · Ⱀ · Ⰲ · ⰄⰅⰜⰅMⰓⰀ · Ⱄ Ⰰ · ⰃⰓ ·	On the holy water bowlstone on the façade of the church. Ligatures: ⰁⰓ, ⰃⰓ.		(Note: ˙˙˙˙˙˙˙)
1573	Gologorica (sv. Petra)	· Ⱍ · Ⰳ · Ⱀ · Ⰲ	On a bell cast by Venetian master Zuan Albini. Accompanied by a Latin inscription A fulgore et tempestate libera nos Domine. Tunc tempore fuit plebanus Georgius Chaligerich. Opus Ionis Albini 1573. Engraver: Ioannes Albini of Venice, possibly from an example of parish priest Juraj Kaligerić.		(Note: ˙˙˙˙˙˙)
1573	Klimno (sv. Klementa)	Ⱍ Ⱇ Ⱀ Ⰲ	Originally a lintel. It was turned upside down during the renovation around 1940.		
1573	Lovran (sv. Jurja)	Ⱍ Ⱇ Ⱀ Ⰲ		(Note: [low res.])	
1573	Roč (sv. Tome)	sante toma ora pro nobis ·Ⱍ·Ⱇ·Ⱀ·Ⰲ·	On a bell cast by Venetian master Zuan Albini, also responsible for the Glagolitic inscription on the bell of the parish priest in Gologorica from the same year.		
1574	Dornberk (sv. Danijela)	ⰒⰑⰒ ⰣⰓⰋ Ⱍ Ⱇ Ⱀ Ⰳ 𓇗 MDMLXIIII	Inscription of priest Juri. Engraver: Jurij Skortiga (†1581).	(Note: ŽDP (2006) [low res.])	(Note: ·˙˙)
1574-09	Kaštelir-Labinci (sv. Trojstva)	ⰕⰑ ⰍⰓⰑⰂⰬ ⰕⰑ Ⰵ ⰖⰝⰋⰐⰡⰎⰬ ⰒⰑⰞⰕⰑⰂⰀⰐⰋ ⰮⰅⰞⰕⰀⰓⰬ ⰮⰀⰕⰅ ⰣⰀⰌⰅⰓ ⰐⰀ ⰎⰅⰕⰅ ⰃⰐⰋⰘ Ⱍ Ⱇ Ⱀ Ⰳ ⰕⰑⰒⰋⰔⰀ ⰮⰋⰔⰅⰜⰀ ⰔⰅⰕⰅⰁⰓⰀ	Ligatures: ⰕⰑ, ⰍⰓ, ⰐⰡ, ⰒⰑ, ⰁⰓ.		
1574	Soline, Sali on Dugi (sv. Jakova)		Destroyed by a lightning strike in 1879.		
1574	Veprinac	Ⱍ Ⱇ Ⱀ Ⰳ	On a building that was once the house of the commune. Covered in façade during the Italian occupation. Rediscovered by Darko Deković in 1981.		
1575	Lovran (sv. Jurja)	Ⱍ Ⱇ Ⱀ Ⰴ ⰆⰖⰒⰀⰐⰀ ⰗⰓⰀⰐⰖⰎⰋⰛⰬ			
1575	Sali (Zmorašnje selo)	·Ⱍ·[Ⱇ·Ⱀ·Ⰴ·] ⰂⰌⰋⰮⰅ...	Natpis na Ćepulovoj kući. On a window of a house. During an expansion of the window in 1957, the owner broke and discarded the stone, and no remains have been found of the inscription. But most of it had already been photographed, and the Sali chronicler Šime Grandov had dated the house to 1575, revealing the lost ending of the year.		(Note: ˙˙)
1575	Svetivinčenat (sv. Katarine)	Ⱍ Ⱇ Ⱀ Ⰴ ⰕⰑⰒⰋⰔⰀ ⰄⰑⰮⰋⰐ ⰒⰓⰅ ⰮⰋⰘⰅⰎ Ⰱ ⰅⰎⰖⰎⰑⰂⰋⰛ ⰒⰋⰔⰀⰘ ⰍⰀⰄⰀ ⰖⰮⰓⰋ ⰮⰑ ⰕⰀⰜ ⰝⰑⰁⰀⰐ	Engraver: domin pre Mihel Belulović son of "Čoban". Ligatures: ⰄⰑ, ⰒⰓ, ⰎⰑ, ⰮⰑ, ⰝⰑ.		
1576–06–10	Dobrinj (sv. Marije od Anđela)	Ⰲ ⰋⰮⰅ ⰁⰑⰆⰋⰅ·ⰀⰮⰅⰐ Ⱍ·Ⱇ·Ⱀ·Ⰵ· ⰐⰀⰄⰀⰐ ·Ⰹ· ⰋⰣⰐ ⰕⰖⰜⰓⰋⰍⰋ ⰔⰕⰅ ⰮⰀⰓⰋⰅ ⰝⰋⰐⰋ ⰖⰈ ⰋⰄⰀⰕⰋ ⰑⰄⰗⰑⰄⰮⰅⰐⰕⰀ ⰋⰄⰑⰕⰀⰕⰋ ⰒⰑⰒ ⰋⰂⰀⰐⰬ ⰣⰓⰅⰞⰋⰛⰬ ⰋⰮⰀⰐⰄⰀ ⰘⰛⰋ ⰋⰂⰀⰐ ⰝⰋⰛⰀ ⰑⰁⰀ ⰔⰍⰖⰐⰋⰘⰬ ⰣⰔⰬ ⰒⰀⰕⰅⰓⰐⰀⰕⰖⰔⰬ ⰑⰛⰅⰮⰑⰄⰀ ⰁⰖⰄⰅ ⰂⰀⰂⰋⰍⰋ ⰂⰍⰑⰮⰬ ⰓⰅⰄⰑⰮ ⰂⰓⰅⰄⰬ ⰑⰄⰓⰅ ⰂⰓⰑⰄⰬ ⰍⰋⰁⰖⰄⰖ ⰐⰋⰣ ⰔⰕⰓⰀⰐⰖ ⰐⰀⰋⰁⰎⰋⰆⰐⰋ ⰒⰑⰓⰅⰝⰅⰐⰑⰮ ⰃⰄⰐⰋ ⰋⰂⰀⰐⰋ ⰋⰮⰀⰐⰄⰋ ⰋⰄⰀⰁⰖⰄⰖ ⰑⰂⰋ ⰂⰔⰅⰮⰖ ⰃⰑⰒⰑⰄⰀⰓⰋ ⰋⰄⰀⰔⰅⰋⰮⰀ ⰃⰖⰂⰓⰐⰕ ⰒⰑⰁⰓⰀⰛⰋⰐⰋ ⰀⰕⰑ ⰍⰀⰍⰑⰔⰅ ⰂⰋⰞⰕⰓⰖⰮⰅⰐⰕⰘⰬ ⰖⰄⰅⰓⰆⰋ ⰀⰎⰋⰕⰋ ⰒⰑⰮⰀⰄⰓⰋⰃⰖⰎⰋ ⰋⰒⰑⰖⰓⰄⰋⰐⰋ ⰍⰋⰅⰔⰮⰑ ⰖⰝⰋⰐⰋⰎⰋ	Commemorates the construction of the church by priest Ivan Jurešić and Manda hći Ivančica. The church fell into ruins. The tablet is now built into the doors of the school building. Ligatures: ⰀⰄ, ⰕⰖ, ⰜⰓ, ⰄⰀ, ⰀⰕ, ⰑⰄ, ⰄⰑ, ⰒⰑ, ⰋⰂⰀ, ⰣⰓ, ⰐⰄⰀ, ⰑⰁ, ⰒⰀⰕ, ⰐⰀⰕ, ⰂⰀⰕ, ⰅⰄⰑ, ⰂⰓ, ⰅⰄ, ⰑⰄⰓ, ⰖⰄ, ⰄⰖ, ⰕⰓ, ⰐⰀ, ⰁⰎⰋⰆ, ⰐⰑ, ⰃⰄ, ⰁⰖ, ⰕⰑ, ⰍⰑ, ⰆⰋ, ⰀⰎ, ⰖⰓ, ⰮⰑ, ⰋⰎⰋ. The first row and last column are in shadow in the Fučić photograph.	(Note: ,)	(Note: ˙˙˙˙˙)
1576–06–19	Butoniga (sv. Križa)	Ⱍ Ⱇ Ⱀ Ⰵ ⰋⰣⰐⰀ ⰄⰐ ⰈⰉ	On the north wall.		
1576	Zamask (sv. Mihovila)	Ⱍ Ⱇ Ⱀ Ⰵ ⰒⰑⰒ ⰎⰂⰓⰜⰬ ⰁⰓⰛⰬ ⰮⰀⰓⰕⰋⰐⰬ ⰅⰐⰅⰕⰋⰛ	On the custody. Engraver: priest Lovrenc Br...ić and/or Martin Jenetić. Ligatures: ⰒⰑ, ⰂⰓ, ⰁⰓ, MⰀ.		
1576	Žminj (sv. Antuna pustinjaka)	[ⰎⰑ]ⰂⰓⰅⰝ]...ⰍⰀⰆⰅ... [Ⱍ·Ⱇ·]Ⱀ·Ⰵ			
1577	Beram (sv. Marije na Škrilinah, južni zid)	Ⱍ·Ⱇ·Ⱀ·Ⰶ ⰕⰑ ⰒⰋⰔⰀⰘ			
1578	Katun by Trviž	ⰎⰅⰕ·ⰑⰄ·ⰓⰑⰋⰔⰕⰂⰀ·ⰃⰔⰀ·Ⱍ·ⰗⰐ·Ⰷ	Ligatures: ⰕⰂ. Discovered by Anton Meden.		
1578	Dobrinj (sv. Antuna)	Ⱍ Ⱇ Ⱀ Ⰷ ⰁⰋ ⰖⰝⰋⰐⰅⰐⰀ ⰕⰀ ⰗⰀ...[Ⰻ]ⰍⰀ ⰒⰓⰋ ⰒⰎⰂⰀⰐⰋ ⰃⰄⰐⰋ ⰒⰑⰒⰋ ⰋⰂⰀⰐⰋ ⰇⰓⰅⰞⰋⰛⰋ	On a holy water bowl originally used as a christening basin. Ligatures: ⰒⰓ, ⰒⰎⰂⰀ, ⰃⰄ, ⰒⰑ, ⰣⰓ.		
1578	Dobrinj (sv. Stjepana)	ⰂⰋⰮⰅ ⰁⰆⰋⰅ·ⰀⰮⰅⰐⰬ·Ⱍ·Ⱇ·Ⱀ·Ⰷ ⰂⰓⰋⰮⰅ ⰒⰎⰑⰂⰀⰐⰀ ⰒⰑⰒⰀ ⰋⰂⰀⰐⰀ ⰣⰓⰅⰞⰋ ⰛⰀ ⰋⰔⰖⰄⰜⰀ ⰎⰑⰂⰓⰅⰐⰜⰀ ⰮⰖⰆⰋⰐⰋⰛⰀ Ⰻ ⰄⰓⰖⰃⰑ ⰎⰅⰕⰑ ⰔⰖⰄⰜⰀ ⰋⰂⰀⰐⰀ ⰀⰃⰐⰖⰞⰋⰛⰀ ⰋⰍⰀⰞⰕⰀⰎⰄⰀ ⰋⰂⰀⰐⰬ ⰮⰋⰘⰀⰎⰋⰛⰬ ⰋⰍⰀ ⰒⰋⰕⰖⰎⰀ ⰒⰑⰒⰬ ·Ⰳ·Ⰹ· ⰆⰀⰍⰀⰐⰬ ·Ⰰ·Ⰹ· ⰋⰎⰣⰄⰋ ⰮⰀⰎⰋⰘⰬ ⰋⰂⰎⰋⰍⰋⰘⰬ ·Ⰶ·ⰔⰀⰕⰬ·Ⰾ·Ⰲ· ⰍⰀ ⰗⰀⰁⰓⰋⰍⰀ ⰅⰔⰕ ⰖⰝⰋⰐ ⰅⰐⰀ ⰕⰅ ⰂⰔⰅ ⰜⰓⰋⰍⰂⰅ·ⰋⰕⰖⰍⰀ ⰂⰔⰅⰃⰀ ⰕⰑⰃⰀ ⰮⰅ ⰔⰕⰀ ⰍⰀⰍⰑ ⰐⰋⰘⰬ ⰜⰓⰋⰍⰋⰑⰄⰐⰋⰘ ⰁⰎⰀⰃⰀ ⰃⰐ ⰁⰑⰃⰬ ⰐⰀⰔⰬ ⰂⰔⰋⰘⰬ ⰒⰑⰎⰮⰋⰎⰖⰌ ⰀⰮⰅⰐⰬ ⰀⰕⰑ ⰒⰑⰮⰅⰞⰕⰓⰋⰘⰬ ⰁⰀⰓⰋⰛⰋ ⰂⰎⰀ ⰑⰂⰋⰛⰋ ⰋⰂⰀⰐⰋ ⰁⰑⰃⰄⰀⰐⰋⰛⰋ ⰈⰂⰓⰁⰐⰋ ⰋⰮⰀⰕⰋⰌⰋ ⰂⰎⰀⰘⰑⰂⰋⰛⰋ ⰈⰄⰑⰁⰓⰋⰐ ⰁⰋ ⰒⰓⰅⰍⰅⰓⰞⰛⰅⰐⰀ ⰒⰑ·ⰃⰐⰋ·ⰁⰋⰔⰍⰖⰒⰋ ⰒⰅⰕⰓⰋ ⰁⰅⰮⰁⰋ ⰐⰀⰄⰀⰐⰬ·	The scribe could be the parish priest Ivan Jurešić or one of the masters, Barić Vlahović, Ivan Bogdanić of Vrbnik or Matija Vlahović of Dobrinj. Ligatures: ⰄⰆⰋ, ⰂⰓ, ⰒⰎ, ⰒⰑ, ⰣⰓ, ⰎⰑ, ⰆⰋ, ⰄⰓ, ⰎⰅ, ⰕⰑ, ⰋⰂ, ⰎⰄ, ⰀⰎⰋ, ⰕⰖⰎⰀ, ⰃⰉ, ⰀⰉ, ⰋⰎⰣ, ⰂⰎⰋ, ⰁⰓ, ⰜⰓ, ⰑⰄ, ⰁⰎⰀ, ⰁⰑ, ⰋⰎⰖ, ⰕⰓ, ⰂⰎⰀ, ⰃⰄ, ⰈⰄ, ⰒⰓ, ⰅⰓ, ⰕⰀⰎ, ⰀⰎ, ⰎⰀ, ⰆⰀ, ⰀⰕ, ⰀⰁ, ⰀⰄ.		
1579 (April 23)	Barban (sv. Jakova, sjeverni zid)	Ⱍ Ⱇ Ⱀ Ⰸ ⰐⰀ ⰋⰂ ⰀⰒ𞀓ⰋⰎⰀ ⰍⰀⰄⰀ ⰁⰅⰘ Ⱑ ⰒⰑⰒ Ⰱ𞀓ⰐⰀⰓⰄⰋⰐ ⰎⰑⰐⰝⰀⰓⰋⰛ ⰂⰁ𞀓ⰁⰀⰐⰅ ⰓⰅⰕⰋⰐⰀ ⰁⰅ ⰑⰔⰎⰑⰁⰑⰄⰋ ⰮⰅ	Engraver: priest Brnardin Lončarić. Ligatures: ⰒⰓ, ⰁⰓ.		
1579	Barban (sv. Antuna, južni zid)	Ⱍ·Ⱇ Ⱀ Ⰸ ⰰⱂ𞀓ⰻⰾⰰ ⰳ ⱂ𞀑ⱂ ⰱ𞀓ⱀⰰⱃⰴⰻⱀ ⱞⰻⰾⱁⱈⱀⰰ	Engraver: priest Brnardin Milohna. Ligatures for ⰒⰓ, ⰒⰑ, ⰓⰄ.		
1579	Ugljan	Ⱍ Ⱇ Ⱀ Ⰸ ⰃⰓⰑⰁ ⰈⰖⰃⰎⰀⰐⰀ	Now lost, but a reproduction by Sabljar survives.		(Note: ˙˙˙˙)

== 1580–1599 ==
Date	Place	Transcription	Name and Notes	Images	Sources
1580	Contovello (Maria della Salvia)	Ⱍ Ⱇ Ⱉ ⰒⰋⰔⰀⰘ ⰌⰖⰓⰅ Ⱂ...	Engraver: Jure.		
1580	Ćokovac by Pašman (sv. Kuzme i Damjana)	Ⱍ̃ ⰗⰑⰜⰍ...ⰀⰄⰀ ⰖⰝⰋ......ⰋⰕⰀ??ⰁⰓⰀⰄⰅ ⰄⰎⰀⰐ...ⰛⰀⰋ ⰣⰓⰅ ⰄⰎⰀⰐ...Ⰰ?ⰑⰔ[Ⰶ?]ⰒⰓ[Ⰶ?]Ⰻ	A gravestone. Ligatures: ⰒⰓ.		
1580	Kanfanar (sv. Marije Magdalene)	¶ Ⱍ Ⱇ Ⱁ ⰮⰋⰔⰅⰜⰀ h ⰮⰀ; Brainovich Giorgio	One of the newly discovered graffitos. Ligatures: ⰋⰔ.		
1580	Zadar (sv. Ivana)	☩ Ⱍ Ⱇ Ⱁ Ⱅ Ⰵ ⰕⰀⰁⰓⰐⰍⰖ Ⱇ Ⱅ Ⱃ Ⱄ Ⰻ Ⱆ ⰈⰀ	Ligatures: ⰁⰓ. Originally in the Crkva sv. Ivana in the Franciscan monastery of the Third Order in Zadar. Discovered 1896 in the Crkva Gospe od Ružarija in Posedarje by Luka Jelić.		(Note: ˙˙)
1581–01–01	Sali (sv. Marije)	Ⱍ Ⱇ Ⱁ Ⰰ ⰐⰀⰈⰅⰐⰐ ⰁⰋ ⰒⰑⰝⰅⰕⰀ ⰗⰁⰓⰋⰍⰀ ⰜⰓⰋⰍⰂⰅ ⰔⰕⰅ ⰮⰀⰓⰋⰅ ⰔⰀⰎⰋ ⰐⰀⰂⰓⰋⰮ ⰒⰑⰝⰕⰑⰂⰀⰐⰑⰃⰀ ⰄⰑⰮⰋⰐⰀ ⰮⰀⰕⰖⰎⰀ ⰁⰀⰎⰋⰛⰀ ⰒⰀⰓⰑⰘⰋⰡⰐⰀ ⰀⰐⰕⰑⰐⰀ ⰍⰓⰀⰋⰐⰅ ⰀⰐⰕⰑⰐⰀ ⰓⰀⰝⰋⰛⰀ ⰣⰓⰌⰀ ⰮⰀⰓⰋⰐⰔⰋⰛⰀ ⰮⰀⰓⰋⰀⰐⰀ ⰁⰓⰈⰋⰝⰋⰛⰀ ⰐⰀⰔⰎⰀⰂⰖ ⰁⰑⰆⰣ ⰋⰓⰅⰝⰅⰐⰅ ⰐⰅⰃⰀ ⰄⰋ ⰮⰀ ⰀⰮⰅⰐ	Natpis na župnoj crkvi sv. Marije. Commemorates the beginning of the construction of the church in the time of parish priest Matul Batalić.		(Note: ˙˙˙˙˙˙)
1581–01–22	Bačva (Majke Božje od Karmela)	Ⱍ·Ⱇ·Ⱁ·Ⰰ·ⰮⰋⰔⰅⰜⰀ· ⰌⰅⰐⰂⰓⰀ·ⰐⰀ·Ⰻ·Ⰱ·Ⱂ𞀓ⰅⰮⰋⰐ· ⰖⰃⰄⰐⰬ·Ⱂ𞀓Ⰵ·ⰔⰕⰅⰒⰐⰬ ⰄⰅⰍⰑⰂ Ⰻ·ⰛⰬ·ⰒⰎⰂⰐⰬ·ⰁⰀⰝⰂ𞀅ⰔⰍⰋ·ⰍⰅ ⰮⰖⰅ̀Ⰳ𞀓ⰑⰁⰬⰒⰎⰀⰝⰀ·ⰀⰃ𞀓ⰅⰘⰋ· [Ⰱ]ⰑⰃⰀⰕⰀⰋ·ⰔⰕⰂⰑⰋⰂⰕⰀ· [Ⰳ𞀓Ⱁ]ⰁⰬ·ⰄⰀⰔⰅ·ⰐⰋⰮⰀ·ⰒⰑⰍⰑⰒⰬ·ⰐⰋ Ⱃ[ⰀⰈⰂⰅ]·ⰀⰍⰑⰁⰋ·ⰍⰋ·ⰓⰅⰄⰂⰐⰍⰬ·Ⰱ [ⰋⰎⰬ·ⰑⰄⰒⰀⰓⰕⰅ]ⰄⰅⰍⰑⰂⰋⰛⰬ·Ⰸ [ⰝⰁⰋ·ⰈⰀ·ⰐⰅⰬ·Ⱂ[ⰀⰎⰃ𞀓Ⱁ]Ⰱ·ⰐⰀⰞⰒ [ⰅⰐⰄⰋⰡⰁⰋⰂⰞⰅⰃⰀ]ⰔⰕⰅⰒⰀⰐⰀ; M·Z·Z·...❦❦	Sveti Ivan od Šterne) and who signed the bell of the Crkva sv. Pankracije in Brkač in 1602. Because of wear, the transcription in the letter of parish priest Kaštelc from Sveti Lovreč Pazenatički to Vjekoslav Spinčić dated 22 April 1881 (Arhiv HAZU VIII 161) is necessary for the reconstruction of the text.	(Note: , NSK)	
1581	Beram (sv. Marije na Škrilinah, sjeverni zid)	Ⱍ Ⱇ Ⱁ Ⰰ			
1581	Radovani (sv. Jurja)	Ⱍ Ⱇ Ⱁ Ⰰ			
1582–05–21	Zrenj (sv. Jerolima)	Ⱍ·Ⱇ·Ⱁ·Ⰱ·ⰮⰀⰅ ⰐⰀ ⰄⰀⰐ·ⰋⰀ·ⰍⰀⰄⰀ ⰁⰅ ⰕⰑ ⰐⰀⰝⰋⰐⰅⰐⰑ ⰂⰀⰂⰓⰋⰮⰅ ⰆⰖ ⰒⰀⰐⰀ ⰕⰑⰐⰋⰐⰀ ⰓⰋⰒⰅ ⰔⰋⰅ ⰒⰘ Ⰵ ⰋⰂⰀⰐ ⰞⰕⰑⰍⰑⰂⰋⰛ	Commemorates some construction effort in 1582. Engraver: Ivan Štoković. Now lost, but reproductions by Mijat Sabljar and Ivan Roza, I. Batel, Jakov Volčić and Domenico Cimador. It was last seen in the possession of Antun Jakac of Zrenj in 1871. Ligatures: ⰕⰑ, ⰆⰖ, ⰋⰂ, ⰞⰕⰑ, ⰍⰑⰂ, ⰀⰂⰓ, ⰀⰐ.		(Note: ˙˙˙˙˙˙˙˙˙˙)
1582	Barban (sv. Jakova, sjeverni zid)	Ⱍ Ⱇ Ⱁ Ⰱ ⱅ𞀖 ⰱⱑ [ⰶⰰ]ⰽⰰⱀ ⱞⰻⱈⰵⰾ ⱞⰰⱃⰽⱆ[ⱍⰻⱋ] ⰸⰱⱑⱃⱞⰰ ⰱ𞀑ⰳ ⱄⱀⰰⱞⰻ ⰰⱞⰵⱀ	Engraver: deacon Mihel Markučić of Beram. Ligatures: ⰕⰖ, ⰁⰑ.		
1582	Sali (sv. Marije)	ⰕⰑⰅ ⰃⰓⰑⰁ ⰎⰖⰍ Ⰵ ⰌⰋⰂⰀⰐⰝⰋⰛ Ⰰ ⰋⰐⰅⰃⰑⰂⰀ ⰔⰋ ⰐⰀⰄⰮ ⰃⰓⰃⰖⰓⰀ Ⰾ ⰅⰕ ⰃⰑⰔⰒⰑⰄⰋⰐ ⰑⰂⰋⰘ Ⱍ Ⱇ Ⱁ Ⰱ	Natpis na nadgrobnoj ploči nagnutoj na zid crkve sv. Marije. Originally the gravestone of Luka Ivančić and his son don Grgur Ivančić.		(Note: ˙˙˙˙˙)
1582	Vranja (sv. Petra)	Ⱍ Ⱇ Ⱁ Ⰱ ... ⰘⰐⰄ?...			
1583	Rovinjsko Selo (sv. Marije od Sniga)	Ⱍ Ⱇ Ⱁ Ⰲ ⰮⰋⰔⰅⰜⰀ ... Ⰴ... Ⰲ ⰕⰑ ⰒⰋⰔⰀ ⰒⰑⰒ ⰮⰋⰘⰑⰂⰋⰎ ⰍⰎⰖⰐⰋⰛ ⰋⰈⰎⰋⰈⰐⰀⰐⰀ ⰍⰀⰄⰀ ⰁⰅ ⰄⰑⰞⰀⰎ ⰔⰅⰎⰑ ⰓⰑⰂⰋⰐⰔⰍⰑ	Ligatures: ⰕⰑ, ⰄⰑ.	(Note: Meden)	
1584	Ćokovac by Pašman (sv. Kuzme i Damjana)	Ⱍ Ⱇ Ⱁ Ⰳ ⰍⰀⰄⰀ ⰖⰝⰋ ⰐⰋ ⰕⰀ [Ⰳ]ⰓⰑⰁ ⰓⰀⰄⰅ ⰄⰎⰀⰐⰝ[Ⰻ]ⰛⰀ Ⰻ ⰣⰓⰅ ⰄⰎⰀⰐ[ⰝⰋ]ⰛⰀ Ⰻ ⰑⰔⰕⰀⰎⰋ	Engraver: Rade and Jure Dlančić. After WWII, before the renewal of the monastery, a vandal broke the stone into 9 pieces, which father Benedikt Celegin later glued back together.	(Note: , CH (2008))	
1584	Ponikve (disambiguation) (church)	·Ⱇ·Ⰳ			
1585-04-15	Vrbnik (Uznesenja BDM)	ⰂⰋⰮⰅ ⰁⰑⰆⰅ ⰀⰮⰅⰐ Ⱍ Ⱇ Ⱁ Ⰴ ⰒⰑⰝⰅ ⰕⰀ ⰜⰓⰋⰍⰋ ⰈⰋⰄⰀⰕ ⰀⰒⰓⰋⰎⰀ ⰄⰀⰐ ⰉⰄ ⰕⰀ ⰄⰀⰐ ⰁⰋ ⰐⰀⰕⰋ ⰂⰓⰋⰮⰅ ⰁⰋⰞⰅ	Ligatures: ⰒⰓ.		
1585	Barban (sv. Jakova, sjeverni zid)	Ⱍ Ⱇ Ⱁ Ⰴ ⱅⰵⰳⰰ ⰾⰵⱅⰰ ⰱⰻⱎⰵ ⰽⰰⱃⰵⱎⱅⰻⱑ ⰶⰻⱅⰰ ⰾⱆⰴⰵⱞ ⰻ ⱆⰾⰰ	Uses ligature ⰖⰎ.		
1585	Olib (Uznesenja BDM)	Ⱍ Ⱇ Ⱁ Ⰴ	Originally on the church, commemorating its renovation. In the time of Jelić it was housed in the parish priest's house. It is now lost.		
1586-10	Blažići by Kastav	Ⱍ.Ⱇ.Ⱁ.Ⰵ. ⰮⰅⰔⰅⰜⰀ Ⱁ ⰍⰕⰁⰓⰀ ⰖⰝⰋⰐⰋ ⰮⰀⰕⰅⰋ ⰁⰎⰅⰝⰋ Ⱋ ⰕⰖ ⰎⰀⰅ ?? ? ? ⰓⰂⰅ ⰋⰆⰅ ? ? ? Ⱀ ? ?	Engraver: Matej Blečić. Originally on a residential house in the village Blažići, but now lost. It survives in a reproduction by Jakov Volčić.		
1587 (April 90 [sic])	Barban (sv. Antuna, sjeverni zid)	ⰆⰀⰍⰀⰐⰬ ⰮⰀⰓⰍⰑ Ⱍ Ⱇ Ⱁ Ⰶ ⰕⰀⰄⰀ ⰕⰅⰝⰀⰞⰅ ⰍⰀⰄⰀ ⰆⰋⰕ𞀑 ⰁⰅⰞⰅ Ⱂ𞀑ⰮⰓⰎⰑ Ⰻ... ⰑⰄⰮⰅⰔⰅⰜⰀ ⰔⰅⰍⰕⰅⰐⰁ𞀓Ⰰ ⰄⰑⰮⰅⰔⰅⰜⰀ ⰮⰀⰓⰝⰀ ⰐⰖⰮⰅⰓ·Ⱂ·ⰀⰒⰓⰋⰎⰀ	Commemorates a famine. Engravers: deacon Marko, Ivan Lovračić. Ligatures: ⰄⰀ, ⰝⰀ, ⰕⰑ, ⰒⰑ, ⰁⰓⰀ. On the same wall, by the depiction of Saint Dionysius, there are many damaged, barely legible inscriptions.		
1587	Hum (sv. Jeronima na groblju)	Ⱍ Ⱇ Ⱁ Ⰶ			
1588	Brseč (Mihinova štala)	Ⱍ Ⱇ Ⱁ Ⰷ	On a lintel of the first floor.		
1588	Cerovlje (sv. Trojstva)	☩ Ⱍ Ⱇ Ⱁ Ⰷ M D L XXXVIII ⰒⰑⰒ ⰋⰂⰀⰐ·Ⱁ ⰁⰖⰁⰋⰛ ⰒⰎⰑⰂⰀⰐ; P 🙢 H 🙢 b 🙢 🙢 P 🙢	On a millstone. Commemorates the renovation and expansion of the church. Ligatures: ⰂⰀ ⰒⰎⰑ.		(Note: ˙˙˙˙˙˙˙˙)
1588	Čepić (sv. Marije od Snijega)	ⰒⰑAⰔTⰋ? ⰔⰂ Ⱄ Ⰲ Ⰱ ⰋⰈ Ⱍ^{☩} Ⱇ^{☩} Ⱁ ^{☩}Ⰷ ⰎⰋⰕ ⰓⰑⰕⰂⰀ ⰮⰑⰃⰀ Ⱍ^{☩}Ⱇ^{☩}Ⰾ^{☩}Ⰰ ⰋⰓⰅⰍⰑⰘ ⰒⰓⰂⰖ ⰮⰋⰔⰖ ⰑⰂⰄⰅ	Commemorates the first mass recited by the young priest Stipan (born 1551). Engraver: Stipan. Ligatures: ⰒⰑ, Ⰻ?, ⰔⰂ, ⰮⰑ, ⰒⰓⰂ, ⰑⰂ.		
1588	Glavotok (samostan sv. Marije)	Ⱑ ⰗⰓⰀ ⰮⰋⰍⰖⰎⰀ ·I·S ☩·8·8· ⰞⰋⰃⰑⰂⰋⰛ	Engraver: fra Mikula Šigović of Rab.		
1588	Hum (sv. Jeronima na groblju)	Ⱍ Ⱇ Ⱁ Ⰸ	To the right of the 1587 inscription.		
1588	Lindar (sv. Martina)	Ⱑ ⰒⰑⰒ ⰮⰀⰕⰖⰞⰋⰛ ⰒⰎⰐ ⰎⰋⰐⰓⰔⰍⰬ ⰒⰓⰂⰑ ⰁⰋ ⰂⰉ ⰎⰅⰕ... ⰒⰑⰕⰮ ⰕⰃⰀ ⰍⰀ ⰐⰍ ⰋⰒⰎ[ⰑⰂⰀⰐ] ⰁⰓⰁⰀⰔⰍⰋ ⰔⰕⰑⰓ ⰔⰕⰑⰓⰋⰕ ⰑⰂ ⰃⰓⰑⰁ ⰔⰅⰁⰋ ⰋⰔⰂⰑⰮ ⰅⰓⰅⰄⰑⰮ Ⱍ Ⱇ Ⱁ Ⰷ	On a gravestone in the church. Engraver: Matušić parish priest ⰎⰋⰐⰄⰀⰓⰀ ⰋⰍⰀⰐⰑⰐⰋⰍⰬ ⰂⰬⰁⰀⰓⰁⰀⰐⰖ. Ligatures: ⰒⰑ, ⰒⰎⰐ, ⰒⰓ, ⰂⰑ, ⰁⰓ, ⰕⰑ, ⰃⰓ.		(Note: ˙˙)
1589 (April 29)	Barban (sv. Jakova, sjeverni zid)	·Ⱍ·Ⱇ·Ⱁ·Ⰸ ⰐⰀ ⰋⰈ ⰀⰒⰓⰋⰎⰀ· Ⱑ ⰮⰀⰕⰋⰋ ⰕⰑⰐⰍⰑⰂⰋⰛ ⰒⰋⰔⰀⰘ [ⰁⰀ] ⰍⰋ ⰕⰑ ⰒⰋⰔⰀ ⰁⰀ ⰘⰂⰀⰎⰋ	Engraver: Matij Tonković. Ligatures: ⰁⰀ, ⰘⰂⰀ.		
1590-01	Kanfanar (sv. Marije Magdalene)	Ⱍ Ⱇ Ⱂ ⰮⰋⰔⰅⰜⰀ ⰌⰅⰐⰀⰓⰀ... ⰒⰓⰅ ⰎⰖⰍⰀ ⰃⰎ...	One of the newly discovered graffitos. Ligatures: ⰒⰓ, ⰃⰎ.		
1590–06–18	Boljun (sv. Jurja)	Ⱍ Ⱇ Ⱂ ⰋⰣⰐⰀ ⰄⰀⰐ ⰇⰉ ⰂⰕⰑ ⰂⰓⰅⰮⰅ ⰆⰣⰒⰀⰐ ⰣⰓⰋ ⰮⰕⰋⰡⰞⰛ ⰍⰀⰐⰑⰐⰍ ⰒⰓ ⰮⰓⰕⰐ ⰮⰕⰋⰡⰞⰛ ⰒⰑⰒ ⰂⰜⰐⰜ ⰗⰓⰎⰀⰐⰛ ⰒⰎⰂⰀⰐ ⰁⰑⰎⰣⰐⰔⰍⰋ	Scribe was one of the following: župan Juri Matijašić, kanonik pre Martin Matijašić, parish priest Vicenc Frlanić. Ligatures: ⰣⰐⰀ, ⰇⰉ, ⰂⰓ, ⰆⰣ, ⰣⰓ, ⰞⰛ, ⰐⰑ, ⰒⰓ, ⰮⰓ, ⰒⰎⰂⰀ, ⰁⰑⰎⰣ, ⰕⰋ. Extremely rare for the period is the form Ⱅ𞀋 Kukuljević received a transcription from Sabljar.		(Note: ˙˙˙˙˙˙˙)
1590–07–03	Kršan (sv. Jakova na groblju)	Ⱍ Ⱇ Ⱂ ⰕⰑ ⰒⰋⰔⰀⰘⰮ ⰌⰀ ⰒⰓⰅ ⰃⰀⰞⰒⰀⰓⰬ ⰓⰀⰄⰮⰋⰎ^{Ⰻ}ⰛⰬ ⰁⰖⰄⰖⰛⰋ ⰂⰀⰕⰑ ⰂⰓⰋⰮⰅ ⰍⰀⰒⰅⰎⰀⰐⰬ ⰂⰍⰓⰞⰀⰐⰬ ⰋⰂⰀⰕⰑ ⰋⰔⰕⰑ [ⰂⰓ]ⰋⰮⰅ ⰮⰋⰎⰅⰈⰋⰮⰀ ⰍⰀⰍⰑ ⰈⰃⰑⰓⰀ ⰮⰋⰔⰅ[Ⱌ]Ⰰ ⰣⰎⰅⰌⰀ ⰐⰀ ⰄⰀⰐ ·Ⰲ̃· ⰁⰖⰄⰖⰛⰋ...ⰔⰂⰅⰕⰑ[Ⰳ]Ⰰ ⰌⰀⰍⰑⰂⰀ ⰋⰍⰋ ⰖⰝⰋⰐⰋ ⰂⰓⰀⰕⰀ... ⰄⰀⰁⰋ ⰒⰓⰂⰑ ⰁⰋⰎⰀ ⰄⰑ...	Engraver: priest Gašpar Radmilić chaplain of Kršan. Discovered in 1991. Photographed by Anton Meden. Ligatures: ⰕⰑ, ⰒⰓ, ⰂⰓ, ⰍⰑ, ⰃⰑ, ⰄⰑ.		
1590–09–08	Kožljak (sv. Jurja na groblju)	Ⱍ Ⱇ Ⱂ ⰔⰅⰍ ? Ⰷ ⰡⰀ̃·MⰅⰞⰕⰀⰓ̃·ⰎⰖ ⰑⰄ̃·ⰃⰓⰑ̃·ⰔⰀⰮ ⰔⰕⰑⰓⰋ ⰑⰂⰖ̃·ⰞⰍ ⰐⰀ̃·ⰃⰓⰑ̃·MⰑⰅ ⰘⰛⰅ ⰓⰋ̃·ⰐⰅⰞ ⰄⰀ ⰔⰅ ⰐⰅ ⰒⰓⰅ ⰈⰀⰁ Ⰾ Ⰴ Ⱎ̃·	On a gravestone. Engraver: master Luka of Grobnik, who was likely illiterate, working from a priest's example. First noted by Volčić but not published until Fučić 1982.		
1590	Brseč	Ⱍ Ⱇ Ⱀ Ⱍ Ⱈ Ⰳ	Built into a wall upside down. First published by Viškanić in 1994.		
1590	Porozina (sv. Antuna)	Ⱍ Ⱇ Ⱂ	On a gravestone of a Bokina family member. Sv. Antuna was once the monastery church Sv. Nikole.		
1591–05–11	Labinci (samostan sv. Mihovila)	Ⱍ Ⱇ Ⱂ Ⰰ ⰮⰅⰔⰜ Ⰰ ⰮⰀⰡ ⰐⰀⰄⰀⰐ Ⰰ·Ⰹ·	Originally in the Monastery of Saint Michael. Repurposed in building a stable in the yard of house No. 48, once owned by Josip Košeto. Transferred to the Muzej u Poreču in 1967.		
1591	Contovello (Maria della Salvia)	Ⱍ Ⱇ Ⱂ Ⰰ ⰕⰑ ⰒⰋⰔⰀ ⰡⰄⰓⰅ ⰆⰀⰍⰀⰐ ⰑⰄ ⰓⰑⰂⰋⰐⰀ	Engraver: Jadre deacon of Rovinj.		
1591 (in/after)	Vrbnik (sv. Martina)	ⰂⰔⰀⰍⰋ ⰍⰋ ⰓⰅⰝⰅ ⰑⰝⰅ ⰐⰞⰬ ⰋⰈⰄⰓ ⰀⰂⰖ ⰮⰀⰓ ⰋⰣ ⰋⰮⰀ ⰒⰓⰑⰛ ⰅⰐⰀ ⰄⰀⰐⰬ Ⰽ	The chapel was built in 1591.		
1592–01–16	Vrbnik (Uznesenja BDM)	ⰂⰋⰮⰅ ⰁⰑⰆⰋⰅ ⰀⰮⰅⰐ ⰎⰅⰕ ⰑⰄ ⰍⰓⰔⰕ ⰑⰂⰀ ⰓⰑⰋⰔⰕⰂⰀ Ⱍ Ⱇ Ⱂ Ⰱ ⰅⰐⰂⰀⰓ Ⰰ ⰄⰀⰐ ⰅⰉ ⰁⰋ ⰒⰑⰝⰅⰕⰀ ⰕⰀ ⰍⰀⰒⰅ	Ligatures: ⰅⰕ.		
1592–01–23	Šorići (sv. Marije Magdalene)	Ⱍ Ⱇ Ⱂ Ⰱ ⰮⰋⰔⰅⰜⰀ ⰌⰅⰐⰂⰀⰓⰀ ⰄⰀⰐ ⰋⰂ ⰒⰓⰅ ⰎⰖⰍⰀ ⰃⰎⰑⰁⰛ	Engraver: pre Luka Globić. Ligatures: ⰒⰓ, ⰃⰎ.		
1592	Cerovlje (sv. Trojstva)	ⰝⰗⰒⰁ	On a stone pillar next to the parish church.		
1592	Sovinjak		On the old parish priest's house. Duplicate or misreading (absent from Fučić 1982)?		
1592	Lindar (sv. Marije Magdalene)	ⰮⰀⰕⰅ Ⱍ...	Engraver: Mate Č.		
1593	Draguć (sv. Roka)	Ⱍ Ⱇ Ⱂ Ⰲ	On the north wall.		
1594 (April 4)	Kaldir (sv. Trojstva)	Ⱍ Ⱇ Ⱂ Ⰳ ⰀⰒⰓⰋⰡ Ⰳ	On the holy water bowl. Ligatures: ⰒⰓ.		
1594–09–09	Grobnik (sv. Filipa i Jakova)	ⰎⰅⰕ·ⰘⰂⰘⰬ Ⱍ·Ⱇ·Ⱂ·Ⰳ ⰮⰋⰔⰅⰜⰀ ⰔⰅⰍⰕⰅⰁⰓⰀ·ⰄⰀⰐ·Ⰸ·ⰒⰓⰅⰮⰋⰐⰖ ⰒⰑⰒⰬ ⰋⰂⰀⰐ·ⰂⰐⰖⰝⰋⰛ·ⰒⰎⰑⰂⰀⰐ ⰃⰓⰑⰁⰐⰋⰝⰍⰋ·[ⰍⰑⰃ]Ⰰ·ⰄⰖⰞⰀ·ⰄⰀ ⰒⰑⰝⰋⰂ[Ⰰ] ⰂⰬⰮⰋⰓ[Ⱆ]	The gravestone of priest Ivan Vnučić. Ligatures: ⰘⰂ, ⰒⰓ, ⰒⰎⰑⰂ, ⰒⰑ, ⰂⰀ.	(Note: ,)	(Note: ˙˙˙˙)
1594	Batlug (Note: Under the more specific but not more precise "Brtetići" in Fučić 1969, and the broader "Gračišće" in Fučić 1982.) (sv. Križa)	ⰝⰗⰒⰃ	Originally on the façade of the old church, but relocated to the porch when it was rebuilt in 1903.		
1594	Cerovlje	ⰑⰂⰖⰍⰖⰛⰖ ⰖⰝⰋⰐⰋ ⰒⰑⰒ ⰋⰂⰀⰐ. ⰁⰖⰁⰋⰛ ⰓⰅⰄⰑⰂⰐⰋⰍⰑⰮ ⰂⰀ ⰋⰮⰅ ⰁⰑⰆⰅ Ⱍ Ⱇ Ⱂ Ⰳ	On the lintel of the old parish priest's house. Engraver: priest Ivan Bubić. Ligatures: ⰑⰂ, ⰋⰂ, ⰅⰄ, ⰑⰂ, ⰑⰆ, ⰂⰀ. The old house fell into ruins and its stones were built into a new house, including this one. J. Volčić dranscribed it in Kukuljević's time. During the visit of Ivan Milčetić on 4 September 1908 it was in the basement of the parish priest's house, having been taken out. It was lost after 1912.		(Note: ˙˙˙˙˙˙)
1594	Contovello (Madonna della Salvia)	Ⱍ Ⱇ Ⱂ Ⰳ ⰒⰋⰔⰀ ⰒⰑⰒ ⰋⰂⰀⰐ ⰁⰅⰓⰍⰋⰐⰀ ⰂⰐⰖⰍ ⰈⰃⰑⰓⰀ ⰒⰋⰔⰀⰐⰑⰃⰀ	Scribe: the nephew of pop Ivan Berkinić. Ligatures: ⰒⰑ, ⰐⰖ, ⰑⰓ?, ⰐⰑ.		
1594	Oštarije (sv. Marije)	Ⱍ·Ⱇ·Ⱂ·Ⰳ ...Ⰴ...ⰕⰋ... [ⰜⰓⰍⰂⰋ/ⰃⰓⰜⰋ] ...ⰒⰖⰕⰑ	Now lost, and last seen by Kukuljević, who noted that some parish priest had destroyed the second part of the inscription in 1802.		
1594	Sovinjak	Ⱍ Ⱇ·Ⱂ Ⰳ	Once in the residential home of the Mantovan family, now lost. But a reproduction by Volčić survives.		(Note: ˙)
1595	Boljun	Ⱍ Ⱇ Ⱀ Ⰴ ⰒⰑⰒ ⰌⰖⰓⰀⰋ ⰍⰀⰎⰋⰃⰀⰓⰋⰛ	Photographed by Anton Meden.	(Note: Meden)	
1595	Dobrinjsko Polje (sv. Marije od Rođenja)	Ⱍ Ⱇ Ⱂ Ⰴ	On the side entrance on the south wall of the church, originally the main entrance of the old church until its expansion in 1812.		
1595	Gologorica (sv. Petra i Pavla)	Ⱍ Ⱇ Ⱂ Ⰴ ⰒⰑⰒ ⰌⰖⰓⰀⰋ ⰍⰀⰎⰋⰃⰀⰓⰋⰛ; 1 5 9 5	On the outer north wall of the attached Kapela sv. Marije. Engraver: priest Juraj Kaligarić.		
1595	Lovran (sv. Jurja)	Ⱍ·Ⱇ:ⰒⰄ: ⰃⰀⰞⰒⰀⰓ ⰁⰅⰍⰀⰓⰋⰛ ⰒⰎⰑⰂⰀⰐⰎⰑⰂⰓⰀⰐⰔ ⰍⰋⰕⰖⰎⰅⰆⰋ	On the gravestone of Gašpar Bekarić parish priest of Lovran. Ligatures: ⰀⰞ, ⰂⰓ. It was originally in the graveyard of Sv. Jurja, but repurposed in the 19th century for the Peršić family house in the 19th century where Volčić found it. It was extracted from there in 1955 and fixed to the wall of Sv. Trojstva.	(Note: , LP (22 February 2013))	(Note: ˙˙˙˙˙˙˙˙˙˙˙˙˙)
1595	Sveti Ivan od Šterne (sv. Ivan)	QVESTO MVNI; MENTO·A·FATO; FARMISR·PRE; IVRE·S^{T}AVERO; PIEVANODEL; AVILADI·SA; NTOIVANDE; LA · STERNA ⰕⰑⰅⰃⰬⰓⰑⰁⰬⰒⰬⰓⰅⰣⰓⰬ ⰡⰔⰬⰕⰀⰂⰅⰓⰀ; MDLXXXXV	Gravestone of Juraj Staver. Engraver: probably the same one responsible for the 1581 gravestone of Stipan Denković in nearby Bačva. Discovered 24 June 1970 by Branko Fučić on the graveyard wall, where it was being used as a cover-stone. Ligatures: ⰕⰑ.		
1596	Galovac (island) (sv. Pavla pustinjaka)	HORATIVS BELLOTVS VENET·EPS·NONEN·TEMPLVM·HOC·IN HONOREM DIVI PAVLI PRIMI EREMITAE; ET ALTARIA CONSECRAVIT·V·KAL·IAN·M·D·XC·VI; SVB GVARD·F·MICH·NISICH · Ⱍ · Ⱇ · Ⱂ · Ⰵ ·			
1596	Grobnik in Istria (kuća br. 12)	Ⱍ Ⱇ Ⱂ Ⰵ Ⱍ Ⱇ Ⱂ Ⰵ	On a house that once belonged to Franjo Kružila.		
1596	Lindar (sv. Marije Magdalene)	Ⱍ·Ⱇ·Ⱂ·Ⰵ· ⰒⰑⰒ ⰂⰋⰄ ⰑⰓⰎⰋⰛ ⰍⰖⰓⰀⰕ ⰂⰎⰋⰐⰬⰄⰀⰓⰖ	Engraver: Vid Orlić. Ligatures: ⰒⰑ, ⰂⰎ. Vid Orlić served in Lindar from 1591 to 1602.		
1597	Bačva (sv. Jakova)	Ⱍ ⱇ ⱂ ⰶ ⱅ𞀑 ⱂⰻⱄⰰ ⱑ ⱂ𞀓ⰵ ⰱⱃⱅⱁⰾ ⰾⰰ	Grafit na južnom zidu lađe sv. Jakova. Ligatures for ⱅⱁ and ⱂⱃ. Inscriber: Bartol La... (possibly Laković). No photograph in Fučić 1982.	(Note: NSK)	
1597	Draguć (sv. Roka)	Ⱍ Ⱇ Ⱂ Ⰶ ⰖⰮⰓⰋ ⰆⰅⰐⰀ ⰆⰖⰒⰀⰐⰀ ⰣⰓⰋⰡ ⰍⰓⰋⰂⰋⰝⰋⰛⰀ ⰮⰀⰓⰅ	On the north wall. Ligatures: ⰐⰀ, ⰆⰖ.		
1597	Draguć (sv. Roka)	Ⱍ Ⱇ Ⱂ Ⰶ ⰔⰋⰅ ⰒⰋⰔⰀⰘ ⰆⰀⰍⰀⰐ ⰮⰋⰘⰑⰂⰋ Ⰾ ⰮⰋⰎⰀⰔⰋⰛ ⰋⰍⰀ ⰗⰓⰀⰐⰀ	On the south wall. Engraver: deacon Mihovil Milasić. Ligatures: ⰘⰑ.		
1597	Veprinac	Ⱍ Ⱇ Ⱂ Ⰶ	Inscription on the city gate.	(Note: , Adamić (29 September 2018))	
1599 (April 17)	Vrbnik (sv. Marije od Uznesenja)	·Ⱍ·Ⱇ·Ⱂ·Ⰸ·ⰮⰋⰔⰅⰜⰀ·ⰀⰒⰓⰋⰎⰀ·ⰄⰀⰐⰬ ·Ⰶ·Ⰹ·ⰁⰋ·ⰒⰑⰔⰬⰕⰀⰂⰎⰅⰐⰀ·ⰑⰂⰀ·ⰐⰀⰝ ⰋⰐⰁⰀ·ⰑⰄⰬ·ⰀⰐⰍⰖⰐⰋⰌ·ⰖⰂⰓⰋⰮⰅ·ⰒⰓⰋⰔⰅⰕⰎⰑⰃⰀ·Ⰻ·ⰒⰑⰞⰕⰑⰂⰀⰐⰑⰃⰀ·ⰃⰐⰀ·ⰍⰐⰅⰈⰀ·ⰋⰂⰀⰐⰀ·ⰑⰄⰬ·ⰕⰖⰓⰅ·ⰁⰋⰔⰍⰖ ⰒⰀ·ⰍⰀⰓⰝⰍⰑⰃⰀ· ⰍⰀ·ⰁⰋⰝⰋⰐⰅⰐⰀ·ⰖⰝⰋⰐⰋⰕⰋ·Ⱆ·ⰁⰐⰅⰜ ⰘⰬ ⰑⰄⰮⰅⰐⰋⰅ ⰮⰀⰓⰋⰐⰀ·ⰜⰂⰋⰕⰑⰂⰋⰛⰀ ⰍⰑⰕⰑⰓⰀⰐⰋⰐⰀ·ⰒⰑ·ⰐⰀⰓⰅⰄⰁⰋ ⰒⰑⰞⰕⰑⰂⰀⰐⰋⰘⰬ ⰃⰐⰀ·ⰒⰑⰒⰀ ⰁⰀⰓⰋⰛⰀ ⰁⰑⰈⰀⰐⰋⰛⰀ·ⰒⰎⰑⰂⰀⰐ Ⰻ·ⰒⰑⰒⰀ·ⰁⰀⰓⰋⰛⰀ·ⰗⰖⰃⰑⰞⰋⰛⰀ·Ⰻ·ⰑⰔⰕⰀⰎⰋ ⰘⰬ·ⰒⰑⰞⰕⰑⰂⰀⰐⰋⰘⰬ·ⰮⰖⰆⰋ·Ⱆ·ⰑⰂⰑ·ⰂⰓⰋⰮⰅ·ⰒⰓⰑⰍⰖⰓⰀⰕ[ⰖⰓⰋ Ⱁ]ⰄⰜⰓⰋⰍⰂⰅ	Engraver: Martin Cvitović Kotoranin. Ligatures: ⰒⰓ, ⰒⰑ, ⰂⰎ, ⰂⰓ, ⰕⰎ, ⰕⰑⰂ, ⰐⰑ, ⰕⰖ, ⰕⰑ, ⰁⰑ. After the 1950 restoration it was displayed on the side wall of the sanctuary.		(Note: ˙˙˙˙˙)
1599	Contovello (Maria della Salvia)	Ⱍ Ⱇ Ⱂ Ⰸ ⰕⰑ ⰒⰋⰔⰀ ⰒⰑⰒ ⰮⰀⰕⰋⰌ ⰮⰋⰘⰑⰂⰎⰋⰛ Ⱄ ⰜⰓⰋⰍⰂⰅⰐⰋⰜⰅ	Engraver: priest Matij Mihovilić of Crikvenica. Ligatures: ⰕⰑ, ⰒⰑ, ⰘⰑ, ⰂⰎ.		
1599	Grižane	Ⱍ Ⱇ Ⱂ Ⰸ ⰡⰒⰑⰒⰁⰀⰓⰋⰛⰗⰓⰀⰐⰋⰛⰖⰝⰋⰐⰋⰘⰕⰖⰜⰓⰋⰍⰂⰖⰐⰔⰎ[ⰀⰂⰖ]...	On a lintel of the ossuary of the church, having been recycled from an older church. Engraver: priest Barić Franić. Ligatures: ⰒⰑ. Lost, but a reproduction by Mijat Sabljar survives.		
1580s/1590s	Previž (sv. Martina)	ⰒⰑⰒⰬ ⰋⰂⰀⰐⰬ ⰁⰖⰁⰋⰛⰬ	On the underside of a chalice. Engraver: priest Ivan Bubić. Bubić was parish priest in Cerovlje, which had administration over the church in Previš. Photograph in Fučić 1982 slightly obscured by shadow.		(Note: ˙˙˙˙˙˙˙)
1500s (2nd half)	Kastav	...Ⰸ̃ ⰄⰐⰋ	Discovered by Branko Kukurin in 2014 around the wall that once surrounded old Kastav.Kept in the Pomorski i povijesni muzej Hrvatskog primorja in Rijeka.	(Note: Kukurin)	(Note: ˙˙)
1500s (2nd half)	Kastav		Discovered by Branko Kukurin 2014 around the wall that once surrounded old Kastav.		(Note: ˙)
1500s (2nd half)	Sevnica	ⰐⰀ ⰒⰀⰐⰀ ⰁⰑГⰀ ⰮⰋ ⰄⰑⰖⰗⰀⰐⰋⰅ	A Czech language Glagolitic inscription was noted in Sevnica by Jernej Kopitar, either in "Slavische Aufschrift zu Lichtenwald" (Annalen der Literatur und Kunst) or in Grammatik der slavischen Sprache in Krain, Kärnten und Steyermark.		
1500s (end)	Draguć (kuća br. 11)	ⰮⰋⰘⰅⰎ ⰗⰀⰁⰋⰡⰐⰝⰋⰛ ⰑⰂⰑ Ⰵ ⰐⰅⰃⰑⰂⰀ ⰘⰋⰞⰀ ⰐⰀ ⰔⰀⰂ[Ⱆ Ⰱ]ⰑⰆⰖ ⰀⰮⰅⰐ	Engraver: parish priest Mihel Fabijančić. Ligatures: ⰑⰂ, ⰃⰑⰂ. Discovered beneath facade by Bruno Bulić in 1952 only to be covered up by a new layer of facade by the owner.		
1500s (end)	Vrbnik (Spidal)	ⰂⰔⰀⰍⰋ ⰍⰋ ⰓⰅⰝⰅ Ⱁ ⰝⰅ ⰐⰞⰬ Ⰻ ⰈⰄ ⰓⰀⰂⰖ ⰮⰀⰓⰋ Ⱓ ⰋⰮⰀ ⰒⰓⰑⰛⰅ ⰐⰀ ⰄⰐⰬ Ⰽ	Engraver: the same hand responsible for the similar inscription in Sv. Martin (built 1591). Found in the former chapel known as Spidal after being repurposed as an inn, which was demolished in 1928, and the stone with the inscription was used for a wall. It was saved by parish priest Josip Volarić in 1956, who transferred it to the storage of the parish church.		

== 16th century (no further precision) ==
Date	Place	Transcription	Name and Notes	Images	Sources
1500s (? 14)	Barban (sv. Antuna, južni zid)	ⱅ𞀑 ⱂⰻⱄⰰ ⰻⰲⰰⱀ ⰶⰻⰾⰻⱀⱜ ⱞⰻⱄⰵⱌⰰ [...]ⰰ ⰴⰰⱀⱀ ⰹⰲ ⱂ𞀓ⰵ ⱀⰵⱃⰻⱀ ⰱⰰⰾⰴⱁ	Engraver: Ivan Žilin, Baldo Perin. Ligatures for ⰕⰑ, ⰜⰀ, ⰉⰂ, ⰒⰓ.		
15?4-05-11	Dvigrad (sv. Marije od Lokvića)	ⰑⰂⰑ ⰒⰋⰔⰀⰘ Ⱑ ⰒⰑⰒ ⰄⰑⰮⰅⰐⰋⰃ ⰑⰄ ⰔⰑⰕ ⰎⰑⰂⰓⰅⰝⰀ ⰐⰀⰄⰀⰐ ⰉⰀ ⰮⰀⰡ ⰮⰋⰔⰅⰜⰀ ·Ⱍ·Ⱇ·?·Ⰳ· ⰋⰁⰋⰞⰅ ⰮⰀⰓⰕⰐ ⰄⰀⰐ Ⰻ ⰔⰀⰮⰀⰮ	Engraver: priest Domenig of Sotlovreč. Ligatures: ⰂⰑ, ⰒⰑ, ⰎⰑ, ⰂⰓ, ⰔⰀ, ⰄⰀ, ⰜⰀ.		
1500s	Assisi (s. Damiano)	ⰕⰑⰒ[Ⰻ]ⰔⰀ ⰗⰓⰀ ⰎⰖ ⰍⰀ ⰔⰒⰋⰓⰐⰀ	Engraver: fra Luka Spirna. Ligatures: ⰕⰑ, ⰓⰐ.	(Note: 1991)	(Note: ˙˙˙)
1500s	Bale (sv. Antuna, sjeverni zid lađe)	ⱅ𞀑ⱂⰻⱄⰰ ⱂ𞀑ⱂ ⱞⰻⰽⷹⰾⰰ ⰸⱜⰲ𞀓ⱜⱈⰰ ⰽⰰⰴⰰⰱⰻⱈⰻ ⱂ𞀓ⰻⱎⰰⰾⱜ ⱄⱅⰰ...ⱄⰽⷹⱞⱂⰰⱃⱂ𞀓 ⰰⱀⱅ𞀑ⱀ𞀑ⱞ...ⱞ...ⰰ...ⱋⰵ...	Below the 1516 inscription. Engraver: priest Mikula. Uses ligatures for ⰕⰑ, ⰒⰑ, ⰍⰖ, ⰈⰐⰑ, ⰂⰑ, ⰒⰓ, ⰐⰑ.		
1500s	Barban (sv. Jakova, sjeverni zid)	Ⱅ𞀑 Ⰵ Ⰻ ⰌⰀ ⰮⰋⰘⰎ ⰗⰓⰀⰐⰅ...	Left of the Matij Tonković inscription. Engraver: Mihel Frane. Amateur hand. Ligatures: ⰕⰑ, ⰀⰮ.		
1500s	Barban (sv. Jakova, sjeverni zid)	☩ Ⰰ Ⰱ Ⰲ Ⰳ Ⰴ Ⰵ Ⰶ Ⰷ Ⰸ Ⰹ Ⰺ Ⰻ Ⰼ Ⰽ Ⰾ Ⱞ Ⱀ Ⱁ Ⱂ Ⱃ Ⱄ Ⱅ Ⱆ Ⱇ Ⱈ Ⱋ Ⱉ Ⱄ Ⱎ Ⱜ Ⱑ Ⱓ [Ⱗ?]	Glagolitic abecedary, missing Ⱌ.		(Note: ˙)
1500s	Barban (sv. Jakova, sjeverni zid)	ⰀⰽⰑ ⰔⰓⰜⰅ ⰐⰅⰮⰑⰎⰋ · ⰈⰀⰮⰀⰐ·ⰡⰈⰋⰽ·ⰗⰎⰀⰗⰑⰎⰋⰕ𞀑ⰒⰋⰔⰀ ⰋⰂⰀⰐⰆⰋⰎⰋⰎⰋⰐ·ⰔⰋⰐⰬⰍⰀⰄⰀⰁⰡⰞⰅⰔⰋⰕⰬⰔⰮⰑⰍⰀⰂⰔⰖⰘⰋ	Engraver: Ivan Žilin, with the "ⰍⰀⰄⰀ ⰁⰡⰞⰅ ⰔⰋⰕⰬ ⰔⰮⰑⰍⰀⰂ ⰔⰖⰘⰋ(Ⱈ)" added by a second hand. Ligatures: ⰮⰀ, ⰎⰀ, ⰕⰑ, ⰂⰀ.		
1500s	Barban (sv. Jakova, sjeverni zid)	ⱁⰲ𞀑 ⱂⰻ ⰶⰰⰽⰰⱀ ⰳ𞀓ⱎⰽⱁ ⱅⰻⱈⱀⰻⱋ	Engraver: deacon Grško Tihonić. Ligatures: ⰂⰑ, ⰃⰓ.		
1500s	Barban (sv. Antuna, južni zid)	ⱅ𞀑 ⱂⰻⱄⰰ ⱂ𞀑ⱂ ⱄⰵ ⱂⰻⱄⰰ ⱑⰽ𞀑ⰲ ⰲⰾⰽ𞀑ⰲⰻⱋ ⰸⰵⱅ ⱃⰵⱍⰵⱀ𞀑ⰳⰰ ⱃⰰⰻⱀⰻⰽⰰ ⱞ𞀑ⰶⰰⱃⰰ	Near the inscription of Petar Panceta. Inscription by a priest on the occasion of the burial of his father in law Možar. Engraver: priest Jakov Valković. Ligatures for ⰕⰑ, ⰍⰑ, ⰐⰑ, ⰃⰀ, ⰓⰀ, ⰮⰑ.		
1500s (St. Margaret's)	Barban (sv. Antona, južni zid)	Ⱅ𞀑 ⰒⰋⰔⰀ ⰋⰂⰀⰬ ⰎⰑⰂⰓⰀⰝⰋⰛⰬ ⰐⰀ ⰄⰀⰐⰬ ⰮⰀⰓⰃⰓⰅⰕⰋⰐ	Engraver: Ivan Lovračić. Ligature for ⰕⰑ.		
1500s	Barban (sv. Antuna, južni zid)	ⱅ𞀑 ⱂⰻⱄⰰⱈ ⱑ ⰾⱁⰲⱌ	Engraver: priest Lovrenc. Ligature for ⰕⰑ.		
1500s	Barban (sv. Antuna, južni zid)	ⱂ𞀑ⱂ ⰱ𞀓ⱀⰰⱃⰴ ⱂ𞀑ⱂ ⱑⰽⱁⰲ	Engravers: priests Brnard and Jakov. Ligatures for ⰁⰓ, ⰒⰑ, ⰍⰑ.		
1500s	Beram (sv. Marije na Škrilinah, sjeverni zid)	ⰔⰋⰅ ⰒⰋ[ⰔⰀ] ...			
1500s	Beram (sv. Marije na Škrilinah, južni zid)	ⰕⰑ ⰒⰋⰔⰀ ⰎⰑⰂⰓⰅ	Engraver: Lovre. Uses ligature ⰕⰑ.		
1500s	Beram (sv. Marije na Škrilinah, južni zid)	ⰑⰂⰑ Ⰵ ⰔⰎⰋⰒⰋⰜⰋⰌⰀ ⰈⰕⰓⰀⰂⰅ	Ligatures: ⰂⰑ, ⰕⰓ.		
1500s	Beram (sv. Marije na Škrilinah, južni zid)	ⰔⰋⰅ ⰒⰋⰔⰀ ⰆⰀⰍⰀⰐ ⰃⰓⰞⰍⰑ ⰕⰋⰘⰑⰐⰋⰛ	Engraver: Grško Tihonić. Ligatures: ⰃⰓ, ⰘⰑ.		
1500s	Beram (sv. Marije na Škrilinah, južni zid)	ⰕⰑ ⰒⰋⰔⰀ ⰆⰀⰍⰀⰐ ⰒⰋⰔⰀ ⰆⰍ[ⰀⰐ] ...	Engraver: a deacon. Uses ligature ⰕⰑ.		
1500s	Beram (sv. Marije na Škrilinah, južni zid)	ⰂⰓⰀⰆⰅ	Below the Mikula Sarčić inscription.		
1500s	Beram (sv. Marije na Škrilinah, južni zid)	ⰎⰑⰕⰓⰅ ⰋⰓⰖⰄⰅ ⰐⰅⰝⰋⰔⰕⰋ ⰈⰀⰝ ⰔⰕⰑⰎⰋⰍ ⰄⰅⰜⰅ ⰔⰕⰑⰓⰋⰎ ⰒⰑⰃⰖⰁⰋⰕ			
1500s	Beram (sv. Marije na Škrilinah, južni zid)	ⰕⰑ Ⰵ ⰍⰖⰃⰀ ... ⰖⰔⰮⰓⰕⰋ ⰍⰀⰄⰀ Ⰶ... ⰔⰋⰅ ⰒⰋⰔⰀ	Engraver: a deacon.		
1500s	Beram (sv. Marije na Škrilinah, južni zid)	ⰒⰋⰔⰀ ⰆⰀⰍⰀⰐ ⰋⰂⰀⰐ	Engraver: deacon Ivan. Beram inscription 110 in Fučić 1982.		
1500s	Beram (sv. Marije na Škrilinah, južni zid)	ⰕⰖ ⰁⰋ ⰒⰅⰕⰀⰓ Ⰻ ⰐⰀⰅⰮ?			
1500s	Beram (sv. Marije na Škrilinah, južni zid)	ⰔⰖⰄⰀⰜ ⰮⰋⰍⰖⰎⰀ ⰍⰓⰋⰆⰀⰐⰋⰛ			
1500s	Beram (sv. Marije na Škrilinah, južni zid)	ⰎⰑⰕⰓⰅ ⰋⰓⰖⰄⰅ ⰐⰅⰝⰋⰔⰕⰋ	Uses ligature ⰕⰓ.		
1500s	Beram (sv. Marije na Škrilinah, južni zid)	ⰎⰑⰕⰓⰅ ⰋⰓⰖ			
1500s	Beram (sv. Marije na Škrilinah, južni zid)	ⰂⰓⰀⰆⰅ ⰋⰓⰖⰄⰅ ⰐⰅⰝⰋⰔⰕⰋⰂⰋ ⰒⰑⰝⰕⰑ ⰁⰑⰋⰞⰋⰔⰅ ⰃⰑ ⰁⰑⰃⰀ ⰕⰂⰑⰅⰃⰑ	Ligatures: ⰒⰑ, ⰕⰑ, ⰁⰑ, ⰃⰑ, ⰕⰂⰑ, ⰓⰀ, ⰃⰀ.		
1500s	Beram (sv. Marije na Škrilinah, južni zid)	ⰕⰑ ⰒⰋⰔ[Ⰰ] ...	Below the first of Joseph on the depiction of the Flight into Egypt. Uses ligature ⰕⰑ.		
1500s	Beram (sv. Marije na Škrilinah, južni zid)	ⰂⰀⰋⰮⰅ ⰁⰆⰋⰅ ⰀⰮⰅⰐ			
1500s	Beram (sv. Marije na Škrilinah, južni zid)	ⰔⰋⰅ ⰒⰋⰔⰀ ⰆⰀⰍⰀⰐ ⰮⰋⰘⰑⰂⰋⰎ ⰔⰝⰅⰒⰋⰛⰋ ⰕⰓⰀⰮⰒⰋⰛ	Engraver: deacon Mihovil Trampić of Čepić.		
1500s	Beram (sv. Marije na Škrilinah, južni zid)	ⰕⰑ ⰒⰋⰔⰀⰘ ⰆⰀⰍⰀⰐ ⰋⰂⰀⰐ ⰍⰓⰋⰆⰀⰐⰋⰛ	Engraver: deacon Ivan Križanić.		
1500s	Beram (sv. Marije na Škrilinah, južni zid)	ⰖⰄⰓⰋ ⰮⰋⰘⰑ	Describes the image to its right.		
1500s	Beram (sv. Marije na Škrilinah, južni zid)	ⰕⰑ ⰒⰋⰔⰀ ⰃⰀⰞⰒⰀⰓ ⰘⰓⰀⰔⰕⰋⰛ	Beneath "ⰖⰄⰓⰋ ⰮⰋⰘⰑ". Engraver: Gašpar Hrastić.		
1500s	Beram (sv. Marije na Škrilinah, južni zid)	Ⱄ... ⰋⰄⰋ ⰔⰑⰕⰑⰐⰑ ⰍⰀⰍⰑ ⰒⰋⰔⰀⰐⰑ Ⰵ	Allusion to the Gospel of Matthew 4,10.		
1500s	Beram (sv. Marije na Škrilinah, južni zid)	ⰑⰕⰋⰄⰋ ⰔⰑⰕⰑⰐⰑ ⰡⰍⰑ ⰒⰋ	Unfinished.		
1500s	Beram (sv. Marije na Škrilinah, južni zid)	ⰀⰞⰛⰅ ⰋⰔⰑⰕⰑⰐⰀ ⰒⰓⰑⰔⰋⰕ ⰈⰀ ⰁⰑⰃⰀ ⰐⰅⰖⰎⰅⰞⰋ ⰃⰀ			
1500s	Beram (sv. Marije na Škrilinah, južni zid)	ⰑⰄ ⰄⰖⰞ ⰂⰅⰔⰅⰎⰅ			
1500s	Beram (sv. Marije na Škrilinah, južni zid)	ⰕⰑ ⰒⰋⰔⰀ ⰆⰀⰍⰀⰐ ⰋⰂⰀⰐ ⰞⰒⰀⰍⰀ ⰍⰀⰄⰀ ⰔⰅ ⰖⰝⰋⰘ ⰒⰋⰔⰀⰕ	Engraver: deacon Ivan Špaka. Written when he learned to write.		
1500s	Beram (sv. Marije na Škrilinah, južni zid)	ⰖⰔⰓⰀⰎⰋⰔⰅ	Expresses the emotion of the image's viewer.		
1500s	Beram (sv. Marije na Škrilinah, južni zid)	ⰕⰑ ⰒⰋⰔⰀ ⰆⰀⰍⰀⰐ Ⱆ...ⰋⰐ	Engraver: a deacon. Ligatures: ⰕⰑ, ⰆⰀ, ⰍⰀ.		
1500s	Beram (sv. Marije na Škrilinah, južni zid)	ⰄⰅⰓⰋ ⰄⰅⰓⰋ			
1500s	Beram (sv. Marije na Škrilinah, južni zid)	ⰄⰅⰓⰋ ⰔⰎⰋⰒⰝⰅ ⰐⰑⰓⰋ ⰕⰑ ⰒⰋⰔ[ⰮⰑ] ⰕⰑ ⰒⰋⰔⰀ ⰎⰑⰂⰓⰅ ⰘⰓⰀⰔⰕⰋⰛ	Engraver: Lovre Hrastić.		
1500s	Beram (sv. Marije na Škrilinah, južni zid)	ⰕⰑ ⰒⰋⰔⰀ ⰆⰀⰍⰀⰐ ⰎⰑⰂⰓⰅ	Kod Dispute u hramu, pod pismoznancem. Engraver: deacon Lovre. Ligature: ⰕⰑ.		
1500s	Beram (sv. Marije na Škrilinah, južni zid)	ⰕⰑ ⰒⰋⰔⰀ ⰆⰀⰍⰀⰐ	Kod Dispute u hramu, pod knjigom srednjeg pismoznanca. Engraver: a deacon. Ligatures: ⰕⰑ, ⰔⰀ, ⰆⰀ.		
1500s	Beram (sv. Marije na Škrilinah, južni zid)	ⰄⰅⰓⰋ ⰔⰎⰋⰒⰝⰅ			
1500s	Beram (sv. Marije na Škrilinah, južni zid)	ⰎⰀⰆⰐⰋ ⰑⰝⰅⰕⰅ ⰂⰋ ⰈⰁⰑⰃⰑⰮ ⰍⰖⰐⰕⰓⰅⰞⰕⰀⰕⰬ	Ligatures: ⰁⰑ, ⰃⰑ, ⰍⰖ, ⰕⰓ.		
1500s	Beram (sv. Marije na Škrilinah, južni zid)	ⰕⰑ ⰒⰋⰔⰀ ⰆⰀⰍⰀⰐ ⰎⰑⰂⰓⰅ ⰕⰑ ⰒⰋⰔⰀ	Engraver: deacon Lovre. Uses ligature ⰕⰑ.		
1500s	Beram (sv. Marije na Škrilinah, južni zid)	ⰕⰑ ⰒⰋⰔⰀ ⰆⰀⰍⰀⰐ ⰎⰑⰂⰓⰅ	Engraver: deacon Lovre. Uses ligature ⰕⰑ.		
1500s	Beram (sv. Marije na Škrilinah, južni zid)	ⰕⰑ Ⰵ... ⰕⰑ ⰒⰋⰔⰀ ... ⰑⰂⰑ ⰒⰋⰔⰀ ⰆⰀⰍⰀⰐ	Unfinished inscription. Engraver: deacons. Ligatures: ⰕⰑ, ⰂⰑ. Multiple young hands.		
1500s	Beram (sv. Marije na Škrilinah, južni zid)	ⰖⰔⰓⰀⰎⰋ	Inscription expressing emotion upon viewing the image beside it.		
1500s	Beram (sv. Marije na Škrilinah, južni zid)	ⰕⰑ ⰒⰋⰔ[Ⰰ] ... ⰕⰑ Ⱂ[ⰋⰔⰀ] ... ⰕⰑ ⰒⰋ[ⰔⰀ] ... ⰔⰋⰅ ⰒⰋⰔⰀ ⰆⰀⰍⰀⰐ ... ⰔⰋⰅ ⰒⰋⰔⰀ ⰆⰀⰍⰀⰐ ... ⰕⰑ ⰒⰋⰔⰀ ⰎⰑⰂⰓⰅ	Uses ligatures ⰕⰑ, ⰂⰓ.		
1500s	Beram (sv. Marije na Škrilinah, južni zid)	ⰮⰋⰘⰑⰂⰋⰎ	Below the inscription of chaplain Juri Glavinić. Uses ligature ⰘⰑ.		
1500s	Beram (sv. Marije na Škrilinah, južni zid)	ⰔⰋⰅ ⰒⰋⰔⰀ ⰆⰀⰍⰀⰐ ⰎⰑⰂⰓⰅ	Below the 1550 Lupoglav inscription. Engraver: deacon Lovre. Uses ligature ⰂⰓ.		
1500s	Beram (sv. Marije na Škrilinah, južni zid)	ⰕⰑ ⰒⰋⰔⰀ ⰆⰀⰍⰀⰐ ⰋⰂⰀⰐ ⰍⰓⰋⰆⰀⰐⰋ	Below the inscription of deacon Lovre below the 1550 inscription. Engraver: deacon Ivan Križanić. Ligatures: ⰕⰑ, ⰍⰓ.		
1500s	Beram (sv. Marije na Škrilinah, južni zid)	ⰕⰑ ⰒⰋⰔⰀ ⰆⰀⰍⰀⰐ	Below the Ivan Križanić inscription below the inscription of deacon Lovre. Uses ligature ⰕⰑ.		
1500s	Beram (sv. Marije na Škrilinah, južni zid)	ⰕⰑ ⰒⰋⰔⰀ ⰆⰀⰍⰀⰐ ⰋⰂⰀⰐ ⰍⰓⰋⰆⰀⰐⰋⰛ	Below the feet of Christ. Engraver: deacon Ivan Križanić. Ligatures: ⰕⰑ, ⰂⰀ, ⰍⰓ, ⰔⰀ, ⰆⰀ.		
1500s	Beram (sv. Marije na Škrilinah, južni zid)	ⰕⰑ ⰒⰋⰔⰀ ⰆⰀⰍⰀⰐ ⰋⰂⰀⰐ ⰍⰓⰋⰆⰀⰐⰛ	Below the knees of Christ. Engraver: deacon Ivan Križanić. Ligatures: ⰕⰑ, ⰍⰓ.		
1500s	Beram (sv. Marije na Škrilinah, južni zid)	ⰕⰑ ⰒⰋⰔⰀ ⰆⰀⰍⰀⰐ ⰕⰑ ⰒⰋⰔⰀ ⰋⰂⰀⰐ ⰍⰓⰋⰆⰀⰐⰋⰛⰬ	Above the feet of Christ. Engraver: deacon Ivan Križanić. Ligatures: ⰕⰑ, ⰂⰀ, ⰍⰓ.		
1500s	Beram (sv. Marije na Škrilinah, južni zid)	ⰔⰋⰅ ⰒⰋⰔⰀ ⰒⰑⰒ ⰅⰓⰑⰎⰋⰮ ⰕⰓⰀⰐⰒⰋⰛ	Engraver: priest Jerolim Tranpić. Uses ligature ⰒⰑ. Not to be confused with the earlier inscription by the same scribe while he was still a deacon.		
1500s	Beram (sv. Marije na Škrilinah, južni zid)	ⰕⰑ ⰒⰋⰔⰀ	Uses ligature ⰕⰑ.		
1500s	Beram (sv. Marije na Škrilinah, južni zid)	ⰕⰑ ⰒⰋⰔⰀ			
1500s	Beram (sv. Marije na Škrilinah, južni zid)	ⰔⰋⰅ ⰒⰋⰔⰀ ⰒⰑⰒ ⰕⰅⰆⰀⰍ ⰆⰀⰍ	Engraver: priest Težak.		
1500s	Beram (sv. Marije na Škrilinah, južni zid)	ⰔⰋⰅ ⰒⰋⰔⰀ ⰒⰑⰒ ⰂⰋⰜⰅⰐⰜ	Engraver: priest Vicenc. Uses ligature ⰒⰑ.		
1500s	Beram (sv. Marije na Škrilinah, južni zid)	ⰒⰋⰔⰀ ⰆⰀⰍⰀⰐ	Engraver: a deacon.		
1500s	Beram (sv. Marije na Škrilinah, južni zid)	ⰕⰑ ⰒⰋⰔⰀ Ⰶ[ⰀⰍⰀⰐ] ...	Engraver: a deacon.		
1500s	Beram (sv. Marije na Škrilinah, južni zid)	ⰔⰋⰅ ⰒⰋⰔⰀ ⰆⰀⰍⰀⰐ ⰅⰓⰑⰎⰋⰮ ⰕⰓⰀⰐⰒⰋⰛ	Engraver: deacon Jerolim Tranpić. Uses ligature ⰕⰓ.		
1500s	Beram (sv. Marije na Škrilinah, južni zid)	ⰕⰑ ⰒⰋⰔⰀ Ⰽ...	Engraver: "K...".		
1500s	Beram (sv. Marije na Škrilinah, sjeverni zid)	ⰂⰘⰂⰑ ⰋⰮⰅ ⰀⰮⰐ	Uses ligature ⰘⰂⰑ.		
1500s	Beram (sv. Marije na Škrilinah, sjeverni zid)	ⰕⰑ	The ligature ⰕⰑ.		
1500s	Beram (sv. Marije na Škrilinah, sjeverni zid)	ⰖⰮⰅⰓ			
1500s	Beram (sv. Marije na Škrilinah, sjeverni zid)	ⰍⰋⰔⰅ ⰁⰑⰋ ⰁⰑⰃⰀ ⰁⰑⰃ ⰮⰖ ⰑⰝⰅ ⰒⰓⰑⰔⰕⰋⰕⰋ ⰃⰓⰅⰘ			
1500s	Beram (sv. Marije na Škrilinah, sjeverni zid)	ⰕⰑⰕⰖ ⰁⰅ ⰆⰀⰍⰀⰐ ⰮⰋⰘⰅⰎ ⰮⰀⰓⰍⰖⰝⰋⰛ ⰈⰁⰅⰓⰮⰀ	Engraver: deacon Mihel Markučić of Beram. Ligatures: ⰕⰑ, ⰕⰖ.		
1500s	Beram (sv. Marije na Škrilinah, sjeverni zid)	ⰒⰓⰋⰄⰑⰞⰅ ⰔⰅⰮⰑ ⰄⰂⰀ ⰍⰓⰋⰆⰀ Ⰲ ⰐⰅⰄⰅ ⰎⰖ ⰍⰓⰋⰆⰐⰖ Ⰲ ⰔⰑ ⰁⰑⰕⰖ	Ligatures: ⰒⰓ, ⰮⰑ, ⰄⰂ.		
1500s	Beram (sv. Marije na Škrilinah, sjeverni zid)	Ⱁ ⰋⰔⰖⰔⰅ ⰍⰓⰖⰘ ⰀⰐⰌⰎⰔⰍⰋ Ⱁ ⰄⰐⰀⰮⰋ ⰑⰄ ⰐⰀ ⰔⰂⰔⰀⰍⰋ ⰃⰓⰅⰘ ⰕⰅⰞⰍⰋ	Ligatures: ⰃⰓ, ⰐⰀ, ⰔⰀ. Reproduction in Fučić 1982 on p 85.	(Note: (2020))	
1500s	Beram (sv. Marije na Škrilinah, sjeverni zid)	ⰕⰑ ⰒⰋⰔⰀ ⰆⰀⰍⰀ	Engraver: a deacon. Uses ligature ⰕⰑ.		
1500s	Beram (sv. Marije na Škrilinah, sjeverni zid)	ⰑⰕⰓⰑⰜⰋ ⰅⰂⰓⰅ	Unfinished inscription.		
1500s	Beram (sv. Marije na Škrilinah, sjeverni zid)	ⰂⰋⰮⰅ ⰁⰑⰆⰋⰅ ⰀⰮⰅⰐ	Uses ligature ⰁⰑ.		
1500s	Beram (sv. Marije na Škrilinah, sjeverni zid)	ⰒⰓⰅ ⰎⰑⰂⰓⰅ ⰘⰓⰀⰔⰕⰋⰛ	Engraver: pre Lovre Hrastić. Ligatures: ⰒⰓ, ⰂⰓ, ⰘⰓ.		
1500s	Beram (sv. Marije na Škrilinah, sjeverni zid)	ⰕⰖ ⰁⰡ ⰆⰀⰍⰀⰐ ⰃⰓⰞⰍⰑ ⰕⰋⰘⰑⰐⰋⰛ ⰋⰈ ⰁⰅⰓⰮⰀ	Engraver: deacon Grško Tihonić of Beram. Ligatures: ⰕⰖ, ⰃⰓ, ⰍⰑ, ⰘⰑ.		
1500s	Beram (sv. Marije na Škrilinah, sjeverni zid)	ⰔⰅ ⰒⰋⰔⰀ ⰎⰑⰂⰓⰅ	Engraver: Lovre.		
1500s	Beram (sv. Marije na Škrilinah, sjeverni zid)	ⰋⰔⰖⰔ ⰁⰑⰃ			
1500s	Beram (sv. Marije na Škrilinah, sjeverni zid)	ⰈⰀⰍ...	Na plaštu sv. Martina, desno od broša.		
1500s	Beram (sv. Marije na Škrilinah, sjeverni zid)	ⰈⰀⰍ...	Sv. Martin, na konjskom vratu. By the same hand as the other "ⰈⰀⰍ..." inscription.		
1500s	Beram (sv. Marije na Škrilinah, sjeverni zid)	ⰒⰋⰔⰀ			
1500s	Beli (sv. Antuna na groblju)	Ⰱ Ⰶ	An inscription on a gravestone beneath the porch before the church. The porch was built in 1584 according to the register of the lay fraternity responsible for the church (kept at Arhiv HAZU as VIII 194). The gravestone likely dates to around the same time.		(Note: ˙)
1500s	Boljun (ograda oko kuće br. 26)	[Ⰲ] ⰕⰑ ⰂⰓⰅⰮⰅ ⰁⰅ ⰒⰎⰑⰂⰀⰐ ⰒⰑⰒ ⰮⰀⰓⰕⰐ ⰎⰛⰋⰛ	Engraver: parish priest Martin Lušćić or someone on his behalf. Uses ligature ⰒⰎ. Although it is now in a wall around a house, it may have originally been part of the architrave of the parish priest's house.		
1500s	Bukovica (sv. Florijana)	ⰔⰅ ⰒⰋⰔⰀ ⰃⰀⰞⰒⰀⰓ ...	On the outer face of the south wall of the nave. Engraver: "Gašpar" (probably Gašpar Lazarić).		
1500s	Bukovica (sv. Florijana)	Ⱍ Ⱇ ? ⰃⰀⰞⰒⰀⰓ ⰎⰈⰋⰛ Ⰸ ⰍⰓⰞⰀⰐⰀ Ⰱ ⰮⰖ ⰒⰑⰮⰑⰈⰋ	Engraver: Gašpar Lazarić of Kršan.		
1500s	Contovello (Maria della Salvia)	ⰒⰑⰒ ⰀⰐⰄⰓⰅⰌ ⰕⰑ Ⱂ ⰋⰔⰀ ⰍⰀⰒⰅⰎⰀⰐ	Engraver: chaplain Andrej.		
1500s	Čepić (sv. Justa)	...Ⱇ......ⰒⰋⰔⰀ......	It was on one of the older layers of facade in the inner face of the eastern wall of the church, to the left of the altar. It was partially washed off and partially physically damaged. Discovered in 1949 by Fučić when he pealed off layers from the wall.		
1500s	Ćokovac by Pašman (sv. Kuzme i Damjana)	...ⰀⰐⰋⰛ...ⰐⰂ	Engraver: a certain Bogdanić. Discovered in 1570 in the wall of the ground floor of the south part of the monastery.		
1500s	Dobrinj	ⰍⰓⰋⰈⰮⰀ ⰑⰎⰅⰌ ⰮⰀⰈ	On a silver box that once kept three holy oil jars. Now in the parish museum.		
1500s	Dolenja Vas (sv. Marije)	ⰁⰑⰃ ⰌⰅ ⰮⰅⰐⰅ ⰒⰑⰍⰎⰋⰜⰀⰎ ⰔⰋⰐ ⰁⰑⰆⰌⰋ ⰔⰂⰅⰕⰖⰂⰀⰎ ⰄⰂⰘ [Ⱄ]ⰂⰅⰕⰋ ⰒⰑⰔⰂⰅⰕⰋⰎ	Low resolution photograph in Fučić 1982.		
1500s	Dolenja Vas (sv. Marije)	ⰕⰀ ⰒⰓⰀⰂⰋ ⰑⰐⰋ ⰁⰑⰄⰅ ⰔⰂⰑⰌⰅⰣ ⰂⰅⰓⰅ ⰆⰋⰂ ⰃⰓⰃⰖⰓ	The text is a paraphrase of some verses from the Epistle to the Romans, possibly linked to the Protestant movement in Istria. Engraver: Grgur. Ligatures: ⰀⰂ, ⰁⰑ, ⰂⰑ, ⰃⰓ.		
1500s	Dolenja Vas (sv. Marije)	ⰁⰑⰄⰅⰕⰅ ⰕⰓⰅⰈⰂⰋⰐⰅ ... ⰕⰅⰃⰀ ⰂⰋⰐⰀ ⰔⰍⰀⰕⰅⰓⰋⰮ ... ⰕⰑ ⰒⰑⰆⰅⰎⰅⰐⰋⰌ ⰖⰔⰅⰃⰀ ⰘⰖⰄ ... ⰕⰑ ⰒⰋⰔⰀⰘ ⰃⰓⰃⰖⰓ ⰞⰋⰐⰄⰎⰅⰓ.	Engraver: Grgur Šindler. The same Grgur Šindler signed a graffito in the Crkva sv. Marije in Vremski Britof in 1564. Ligatures: ⰁⰑ, ⰕⰓ, ⰃⰀ, ⰕⰑ, ⰒⰑ, ⰃⰓ.		
1500s	Draguć (sv. Elizeja)	ⰅⰂ...ⰕⰑ ⰄⰋ ⰑⰓⰋ...ⰕⰋ...Ⱅ...Ⱀ...ⰂⰓⰅⰮⰅⰐⰀ ⰈⰀⰎⰀ	On the north wall. Ligatures: ⰕⰑ, ⰂⰓ.		
1500s	Draguć (sv. Elizeja)	ⰍⰕⰑ Ⰵ ⰝⰍ ⰍⰋ ⰒⰑⰆⰋⰂⰅ ⰋⰐⰅ ⰖⰆⰋⰅ ⰔⰅⰮⰓⰕⰋ	On the north wall. Ligatures: ⰕⰑ, ⰒⰑ.		
1500s	Draguć (sv. Roka)	ⰔⰋⰅ ⰒⰋⰔⰀ ⰒⰓⰅ ⰄⰖⰮⰅⰐⰋⰃⰑ ⰀⰁⰋⰕⰀⰐⰛ ⰂⰄⰓⰀⰃⰖⰛ[Ⰻ ...]ⰅⰓⰕ...ⰁⰋⰘ ⰂⰅⰎⰅ ⰕⰖⰆⰀⰐ ⰈⰀⰝ ⰁⰬ ⰃⰀ Ⱂ	On the west wall. Engravers: priest Dumenigo Abitanić and an unknown hand that added ⰁⰬ ⰃⰀ Ⱂ. Ligatures: ⰒⰓ, ⰄⰖ, ⰃⰑ, ⰂⰄⰓ, ⰔⰀ.		
1500s	Draguć (sv. Roka)	ⰔⰕⰋ ⰓⰑⰍⰑ ⰮⰎⰋ ⰈⰀ ⰐⰀⰔ	On the west wall. Ligatures: ⰍⰑ, ⰐⰀ.		
1500s	Draguć (sv. Roka)	ⰕⰑ ⰒⰋⰔⰀ ⰒⰑⰒ ⰮⰀⰕⰋⰡ	On the west wall. Engraver: priest Matija. Ligatures: ⰕⰑ, ⰒⰑ, ⰮⰀ, ⰕⰋ.		
1500s	Draguć (sv. Roka)	ⰂⰀ ⰑⰐ ⰝⰀⰔ ⰍⰑ ⰃⰀ ⰓⰑⰄⰋ ⰒⰑⰍⰎⰑⰐⰋ ⰔⰅ	On the south wall. Engraver: same hand as the 1554 graffito. Ligatures: ⰑⰄ, ⰓⰑⰄ, ⰒⰑ, ⰝⰀⰔ.		
1500s	Draguć (sv. Roka)	Ⱂ Ⱞ Ⱂ	On the north wall. Engraver: priest M. P.		
1500s	Dvigrad (sv. Marije od Lokvića)	ⰑⰂⰑ ⰒⰋⰔⰀ ⰖⰓⰁⰀⰐ ⰆⰀⰍⰀⰐ Ⱁ ⰈⰓⰋⰐⰀ	Engraver: deacon Urban of Zrin. Ligatures: ⰂⰑ, ⰍⰀ.		
1500s	Gologorica (sv. Marije)	ⰑⰔⰋⰒⰅ ⰍⰓⰮⰋⰕⰅⰎⰖ ⰃⰑⰔⰬⰒⰑⰄⰀⰐ	Ligatures: ⰎⰖ, ⰃⰑ, ⰒⰑ.		
1500s	Grožnjan (Obzidna ulica)	Ⰲ·M Ⰾ·	Serving as a bench by the outer wall of a residential house in the southern part of the city once owned by a doctor Likar and currently by Danijela Šorgo.		
1500s	Hrastovlje (sv. Trojstva)	ⰕⰑ ⰒⰋⰔⰀ ⰍⰋ ⰂⰑ...			
1500s	Hrastovlje (sv. Trojstva)	ⰑⰔⰀⰎ ⰐⰅ ⰁⰋⰌ ⰑⰔⰎⰅ ⰕⰅⰃⰀ ⰔⰂⰃⰀ ⰮⰖ ⰆⰀ ⰍⰋ ⰔⰕⰂⰑⰓⰋ ⰐⰅⰁⰑ ⰋⰈⰅⰮⰎⰖ ⰋⰂⰔⰅ ⰔⰕⰂⰀⰓⰋ ⰑⰂⰅⰃⰀ ⰔⰂⰅⰕⰀ ⰋⰈⰐⰀ ⰕⰋ Ⱁ ⰐⰅⰁⰑⰓⰅ ⰄⰖⰮⰀⰅ ⰕⰑ ⰔⰕⰂⰑⰓⰅⰐⰋⰅ ⰕⰂⰑⰅ ⰋⰝⰋⰐⰋⰞ ⰔⰕⰂⰀⰓⰋ ⰐⰅⰮⰖ ⰕⰀⰍⰑⰂⰅ			
1500s	Hrastovlje (sv. Trojstva)	ⰔⰅ ⰒⰋⰔⰀ ⰆⰀⰍⰀⰐ ...	On the south wall on the field with the Dance of the Dead. Engraver: a deacon.		
1500s	Hrastovlje (sv. Trojstva)	ⰃⰓ Ⱞ...ⰐⰅⰮⰑ ⰌⰅ ⰂⰋⰐⰑ ⰒⰋⰕ Ⱄ Ⰱ			
1500s	Hrastovlje (sv. Trojstva)	ⰁⰅ ⰁⰅ ⰮⰑⰋ			
1500s	Hrastovlje (sv. Trojstva)	ⰍⰀⰄⰀ ⰁⰋⰘⰑⰮ ⰒⰑⰒⰀ ⰮⰑⰌ ... ⰒⰓⰅ ⰮⰋⰘⰅⰎ ⰒⰎⰑⰂⰀⰐⰖ ⰒⰓⰅⰒⰑⰝⰕⰑⰂⰀⰐⰅⰮ ⰎⰑⰍⰅ ... ⰮⰎⰀⰄⰅⰘ ⰮⰋⰔⰀⰘ ⰌⰀ ⰒⰓⰅ ⰌⰖⰓⰅ ⰓⰑⰄⰑⰮ ⰈⰁⰓⰕⰑⰐⰋⰃⰎⰅ ⰁⰑⰃ ⰐⰀⰔ ⰔⰂⰅ ⰂⰅⰔⰅⰎⰋ ⰂⰀ ... ⰀⰮⰐ	Engraver: priest Jure of Brtonigla.		
1500s	Hrastovlje (sv. Trojice)		Painted on a fresco.		
1500s	Hum (sv. Jeronima na groblju)	ⰒⰓⰅ ⰌⰅⰓⰋⰮ	Engraver: priest Jerolim. Ligatures: ⰒⰓ.		
1500s	Hum (sv. Jeronima na groblju)	ⰕⰑ ⰒⰋⰔⰀ ⰋⰂⰀⰐ	On the upper border of the Mučeništvo sv. Lovre. Engraver: Ivan. Ligatures: ⰕⰑ.		
1500s	Hum (sv. Jeronima na groblju)	ⰕⰑ ⰒⰋⰔⰀ ⰆⰀⰍⰀⰐ	On the upper border of the Mučeništvo sv. Lovre. Engraver: a deacon. Ligatures: ⰕⰑ.		
1500s	Kanfanar (sv. Antona)		One of the newly discovered graffitos.		
1500s	Kanfanar (sv. Agate)	ⰝⰗ...Ⰰ ⰆⰀⰍⰀⰐ...Ⰰ...	One of the newly discovered graffitos.	(Note: CH [low res.])	
1500s	Karojba	Ⱍ Ⱇ...	On a stone beam in the wall of a house in the old part of Karojba currently owned by a lady from Ljubljana. It is thought to come from the Pauline monastery on the hill Sv. Spas that operated until 1792, which had been a Benedictine monastery before that.	(Note: Labinjanin)	(Note: ˙˙)
1500s	Kosinjski Bakovac (sv. Vida)	ⰒⰑⰒⰅⰎⰖⰞⰋⰛⰍ[Ⰻ] ⰕⰀⰄⰀⰁⰋⰘⰒⰓⰋⰁⰀ ⰐⰞⰕⰖⰋ ⰒⰅⰕⰓⰋⰜⰀⰃ...^{Ⰻ}ⰁⰞⰋⰛⰍⰋⰁⰘⰑⰄⰂⰕⰐⰍ	Ligatures: ⰂⰕ. It was originally in the ruins of the old church by the Ribnik castle, used during the construction of the Crkva sv. Vida in 1769. Engraver: lawyer Petrica Grubišić.	(Note: , CH, 1982)	
1500s	Kaštelir-Labinci (sv. Trojstva)	Ⰱ Ⱆ			
1500s	Kaštelir-Labinci (sv. Trojstva)	ⰕⰑ ⰒⰋⰔⰀⰘⰬ ⰌⰀ ⰋⰂⰀⰐⰬ ⰣⰓⰀ ⰕⰋⰛⰬ	Engraver: Ivan Juratić. Ligatures: ⰕⰑ.		
1500s	Kaštelir-Labinci (sv. Trojstva)	ⰕⰑ ⰒⰋⰔⰀ ⰒⰓⰅⰔⰕⰋⰒⰀⰐ ⰁⰓⰀⰋⰐⰑⰂⰋⰛ ⰈⰀⰍⰀⰁ[ⰓⰋ]ⰀⰐ ⰋⰕⰀⰄⰀ ⰁⰋⰘⰬ ⰋⰮⰖⰄⰋⰮ ⰁⰖⰄ? ⰔⰁⰎⰀⰆⰅⰐⰑⰮ ⰍⰀⰄⰀ ⰁⰋⰘⰬ ⰒⰑⰎⰋ ⰞⰀ... ⰂⰀⰂⰅⰎⰋⰍⰑⰋ ⰐⰅⰂⰑⰎⰋ ⰍⰀ... ⰄⰅⰂⰖ ⰮⰀⰓⰋⰖ ⰄⰀⰮⰅ Ⰻ...	Engraver: pre Stipan Brajinović. Ligatures: ⰒⰓ, ⰁⰓ, ⰈⰀ, ⰁⰓⰋⰀ?, ⰮⰖ, ⰁⰖⰄ?, ⰂⰑ, ⰂⰖ, ⰄⰀ. Extisting photographs cut part of the inscription off, made from a video.		
1500s	Kaštelir-Labinci (sv. Trojstva)	ⰕⰑ ⰒⰋⰔⰀ ⰒⰑⰒ ⰃⰀⰞⰒⰀⰓ	Engraver: priest Gašpar. Ligatures: ⰕⰑ, ⰒⰑ.		
1500s	Lindar (sv. Katarine)	ⰒⰓⰅ ⰮⰀⰂⰓⰀ ⰮⰀⰓⰕⰋⰛⰀ ⰀⰓⰘⰋⰆⰀⰍⰐⰀ ⰒⰋⰛⰀⰐⰔⰍⰑⰃⰀ Ⰸ... ⰒⰑⰮⰑⰈⰋ ⰁⰑⰆⰅ	Engraver: Mavro Martić archdeacon of Pićan. Ligatures: ⰒⰓ, ⰕⰋ, ⰍⰑ, ⰒⰑ, ⰑⰈ, ⰁⰑ, ⰮⰀ, ⰮⰀⰓ, ⰐⰀ, ⰃⰀ. Not before 1409.		
1500s	Lom pod Storžičem		Studied by Janez Zor, who photographed it in 2003 (kept at Staroslavenski institut as F 282).		
1500s	Lovran (sv. Jurja)	ⰕⰑ ⰒⰋⰔⰀ	Ligatures: ⰕⰑ.	(Note: [low res.])	
1500s	Lovran (sv. Jurja)	ⰄⰑⰁⰓⰑ Ⰵ ⰅⰄⰋⰐⰔⰕⰂⰑ ⰂⰅⰓⰅ	Ligatures: ⰁⰓⰑ. A reaction to the Protestant movement in Istria.		
1500s	Lovran (sv. Jurja)	ⰔⰋⰅ ⰒⰋⰔⰀ			
1500s	Lovran (sv. Jurja)	ⰕⰑ ⰒⰋⰔⰀ ⰑⰐ ⰍⰑⰮⰖ	Ligatures: ⰕⰑ.		
1500s	Lovran (sv. Jurja)	ⰕⰑ ⰒⰋⰔⰀ ⰑⰐⰬ ⰍⰋ Ⰲ			
1500s	Lovran (sv. Jurja)	ⰔⰓⰀⰮ			
1500s	Lovran (sv. Jurja)	ⰂⰀ ⰂⰑⰎⰋ ⰕⰂⰑⰋ ⰃⰑⰋⰐⰅ ⰂⰔⰀ ⰔⰖ ⰒⰑⰔⰕⰀⰂⰎⰅⰐⰀ	Ligatures: ⰂⰑ, ⰕⰂⰑ, ⰃⰑ, ⰒⰑ, ⰂⰎ, ⰀⰂ. Low resolution reproduction in Fučić.	(Note: [low res.])	
1500s	Lovran (sv. Jurja)	ⰕⰑ ⰒⰋⰔⰀ ⰆⰀⰍⰀⰐⰬ ⰮⰀⰓⰍⰑ ⰮⰓⰀⰂⰋⰛⰬ ⰍⰋ ⰂⰑⰎⰋ ⰒⰋⰕ ⰂⰋⰐⰑ ⰐⰅⰃⰑ ⰂⰑⰄⰖ ⰍⰋ ⰕⰑ ⰒⰋⰔⰀ ⰒⰓⰅⰁⰋⰂⰀⰌ Ⰲ ⰁⰑⰆⰡⰑ ⰮⰋⰎⰑⰔⰕⰅ ⰂⰀ ⰂⰅⰍⰋ ⰀⰮⰅⰐ	Engraver: deacon Marko Mravić. Ligatures: ⰕⰑ, ⰍⰑ, ⰂⰑ, ⰐⰑ, ⰃⰑ, ⰒⰓ, ⰁⰑ, ⰎⰑ, ⰡⰑ.		(Note: ˙˙˙˙)
1500s	Lovran (sv. Jurja)	ⰁⰖⰄⰋ ⰂⰅⰓⰀⰐ ⰐⰅ ⰐⰅⰂⰅⰓⰀⰐ			
1500s	Materada		Inscription on a fragment of a gravestone.		
1500s	Molat (Gospe od Pohođenja)	ⰕⰑ Ⰵ ⰒⰑⰍⰑ ⰋⰐⰑⰃⰀ Ⱂ ⰅⰕⰓⰋⰜⰅ Ⱎ ⰕⰓⰋⰃⰀⰎⰋ ⰛⰀ ⰃⰑⰁ	Gravestone of Petrica Štrigalić. In the sanctuary. Discovered by Cvitanović, seen by Nedo Grbin.		(Note: ˙˙)
1500s (June 1/11)	Mošćenice	[...Ⰻ]ⰣⰐⰬ ⰄⰐ· Ⰰ...	Natpis na ulomku kamena. Found repurposed in a small wall next to the staircase of a public passage below a house. In 1954 it was extracted and taken to the parish church Sv. Andrija for safe keeping.		
1500s	Omišalj (Uznesenja BDM)	Ⱍ Ⱇ ? ?	In the floor by the south wall, once covered by the choral seats. In 1973, a mason accidentally destroyed the inscription. Only a reproduction by Toma Lesica survives, reproduced by Fučić 1982.		
1500s	Paz (sv. Vida)	...ⰋⰔ Ⰰ... [ⰒⰀ]ⰂⰀⰎ ⰒⰑⰍ	Ligatures: ⰒⰑ.		
1500s	Paz (sv. Vida)	ⰕⰑⰮⰀⰞ Ⰰ Ⱞ ⰒⰑⰍ	Ligatures: ⰕⰑ, ⰒⰑ.		
1500s	Paz (sv. Vida)	...Ⰷ ⰒⰑⰍ	Ligatures: ⰒⰑ.		
1500s	Paz (sv. Vida)	ⰒⰅⰕⰀⰓ Ⰰ ⰮⰋ ⰒⰑ	Ligatures: ⰒⰑ.		
1500s	Paz (sv. Vida)	ⰮⰑⰘⰑⰓ Ⰰ ⰮⰋⰔ	Ligatures: ⰮⰑ, ⰘⰑ.		
1500s	Paz (sv. Vida)	...ⰒⰑⰍⰑ	Ligatures: ⰒⰑ, ⰍⰑ.		
1500s	Paz (sv. Vida)	Ⱄ...ⰮⰋ ⰒⰑⰍⰀ	Ligatures: ⰒⰑ.		
1500s	Paz (sv. Vida)	ⰔⰕⰋⰒⰀⰐⰬ Ⱞ Ⰰ ⰐⰀ Ⰸ	Engraver: Stipan. Ligatures: ⰀⰐ.		
1500s	Paz (sv. Vida)	...ⰕⰅ ⰎⰖⰍⰀ ⰮⰋ Ⰰ...Ⰲ			
1500s	Paz (sv. Vida)	ⰕⰑ ⰒⰋⰔⰀ ⰣⰓⰍⰑ ⰆⰀⰍⰀⰐ	Engraver: deacon Jurko. Ligatures: ⰕⰑ, ⰣⰓ, ⰍⰑ.		
1500s	Paz (sv. Vida)	...ⰍⰀ ⰮⰋⰔⰡ Ⰱ			
1500s	Paz (sv. Vida)	ⰒⰋⰔⰀ ⰡⰍⰑⰂ	Engraver: Jakov.		
1500s	Paz (sv. Vida)	[ⰔⰅ] ⰒⰋⰔⰀ ⰆⰀⰍⰀⰐ ⰕⰑⰮⰀ ⰈⰁⰓⰔⰅⰝⰀ [ⰍⰀ]ⰄⰀ Ⱄ[ⰕⰀⰘ] ⰐⰀ ⰒⰀⰈ	Engraver: deacon Toma of Brseč.		
1500s	Pazin (sv. Nikole)	ⰕⰑ ⰒⰋⰔⰀ ⰍⰋ...ⰂⰓ	Engraver: Ki... Ligatures: ⰂⰓ.		
1500s	Pazin (sv. Nikole)	ⰒⰓⰋⰄⰑⰘ ... ⰮⰋⰐⰖ ⰆⰋⰕⰀ ⰄⰀⰞⰅ ⰈⰀⰒⰋⰔⰀ ⰮⰅ	Ligatures: ⰄⰑ, ⰐⰖ.		
1500s	Pazin (sv. Nikole)	ⰡⰀ ⰌⰋⰂⰀⰐ ⰗⰓⰀⰞⰛⰋⰝⰋⰛ ⰒⰓⰋⰄⰑⰘ Ⱆ ⰒⰀⰈⰋⰐ ⰋⰔⰅ ⰈⰀⰒⰋⰔⰀⰘ ⰄⰀ ⰔⰀⰮ ⰌⰅⰄⰐⰀ ⰁⰅⰔⰕⰋⰀ Ⰻ ⰌⰅⰄⰐⰀ ⰗⰓⰀⰔⰍⰀ	Engraver: Ivan Frašćičić, with the last line added by another hand.		
1500s	Pazin (sv. Nikole)	ⰕⰑ ⰒⰋⰔⰀ ⰄⰋⰀⰍ ⰃⰓⰅⰃⰑⰓ ⰞⰐⰄⰀⰓⰋⰛ	Engraver: dijak Gregr Šnidarić.		
1500s	Pićan (sv. Mihovila na groblju)	ⰕⰑ ⰒⰔⰀ ⰒⰓ[Ⰵ] ... Ⱂ... ⰒⰎ[ⰑⰂⰀⰐ] ...	Engraver: parish priest P. Ligatures: ⰕⰑ, ⰒⰓ, ⰒⰎ.		
1500s	Pomjan (Male Gospe)	... ⰑⰕ ⰔⰂⰅⰕⰀⰃⰑ ⰀⰐⰕⰑⰐⰀ			
1500s	Prnjani by Barban (sv. Margarete)	ⰕⰑⰒⰋⰔⰀⰆⰀⰍⰀⰐⰄ[Ⱁ/Ⱆ]ⰐⰋⰆ	Engraver: deacon Duniž. Ligatures: ⰕⰑ, ⰄⰑ/ⰄⰖ.		
1500s	Prnjani by Barban (sv. Margarete)	?[Ⰸ?]...Ⰶ ⰔⰅ ⰒⰋⰔⰀ ⰒⰑⰒ...	Ligatures: ⰒⰑ. Discovered by Antun Meden.		
1500s	Punta Križa (sv. Antona na Parhavcu)	...Ⱇ... ⰕⰑ ⰒⰋⰔ[Ⰰ]...... [ⰒⰓ]ⰂⰀⰄ...	Written with a brush in black ink. Photographed by Damir Krizmanić. Ligatures: ⰕⰑ.		(Note: ˙)
1500s	Rakotule (sv. Nikole na groblju)	ⰔⰅ ⰒⰋⰔⰀ ⰮⰋⰍⰖⰎⰀ ⰒⰅⰓ ⰮⰀⰓⰍⰀ ⰆⰀⰍⰀⰐ	Engravers: priest Mikula.		
1500s	Rakotule (sv. Nikole na groblju)	ⰄⰀⰋ ⰮⰅⰐⰋ ⰐⰋⰍⰋ ⰔⰑⰄⰋⰐ ⰮⰋⰍⰑ ⰕⰀⰍⰑ ⰕⰋ ⰁⰑⰃⰀ	Ligatures: ⰔⰑ, ⰍⰑ, ⰁⰑ.		
1500s	Roč		A fragment of a lintel built into the window of a stable.		
1500s	Sali (sv. Marije)	ⰂⰈⰐⰔⰐⰀⰅⰔⰕⰀ ⰁⰓⰜⰀ ⰐⰀⰄ ⰎⰋ ⰍⰋⰀⰐⰌⰎⰬ ⰂⰐⰁⰔⰍⰀ ⰜⰓⰔⰕⰂⰋⰡ	On a processional cross. Ligatures: ⰌⰎ, ⰕⰂ.		
1500s	Svetivinčenat (sv. Katarine)	ⰂⰋⰮⰅ Ⰱ[Ⱁ]ⰆⰋⰅ ⰀⰮⰅⰐ ⰕⰑⰒⰋⰔⰀ ⰡⰍⰑⰂ ⰆⰀⰍⰀⰐ ⰈⰎⰑⰂⰓⰀⰐⰀ ⰍⰀⰄⰀ ⰁⰡⰞⰅ Ⰴ... ⰂⰅⰎⰍ?	Engraver: deacon Jakov of Lovran. Ligatures: ⰕⰑ, ⰍⰑ, ⰂⰓ.		(Note: ˙˙)
1500s	Sorbar (sv. Petra)	ⰕⰑ ⰈⰀⰒⰋⰔ	On a horizontal yellow border.		
1500s	Vranja (sv. Petra)	ⰕⰑ ⰒⰋⰔ[Ⰰ]	On the field with the Flogging of Christ. Ligatures: ⰕⰑ.		
1500s	Zadobarje (sv. Antuna)	...ⰁⰔⰕ ⰔⰕⰖ, ,	Discovered 2005.	(Note: CH [low res.])	
1500s	Zadobarje (sv. Antuna)		Two rows. Discovered 2005.	(Note: CH [low res.])	
1500s	Zanigrad (sv. Stjepana)	ⰒⰑⰒⰬ ⰗⰋⰎⰋⰒⰬ.	Engraver: pop Filip. Ligatures: ⰒⰑ.		
1500s	Žminj (sv. Antuna pustinjaka)	ⰕⰑ ⰒⰋⰔⰀ ⰕⰀ ...	Ligatures: ⰕⰑ.		
1500s	Žminj (sv. Antuna pustinjaka)	ⰕⰑ ⰒⰋⰔⰀ ⰞⰋⰮⰖⰐ ⰆⰀⰍⰀⰐ ... Ⱄ ⰍⰀⰔⰕⰂⰀ	Engraver: deacon Šimun (possibly from Kastav). Ligatures: ⰕⰑ, ⰮⰖ, ⰕⰂ.		
1500s	Žminj (sv. Antuna pustinjaka)	ⰀⰂ ⰮⰀⰓⰅ ⰀⰮⰅⰐ ⰀⰮⰅⰐⰬ			
1500s?	Jajce		One of the Jajce inscriptions. Discovered in 1996.		(Note: ˙˙)
1500s?	Kastav	ⰄⰀ ⰕⰅ ⰁⰑⰃ ⰝⰖⰂⰀ ⰑⰄⰕⰑ? ⰃⰀ ⰮⰡⰔⰕⰀ	Found on the city dungeon. Now lost. Survives in transcription by Mijat Sabljar (AHAZU XV 23/D VI 93 sl. 338).		
1500s?	Ozalj (Žitnica)	Ⰻ	In a residential house of the Zrinski family in the old city known as Žitnica.		
1500s?	Povljana on Pag		On jars of holy oil. Now lost.		
1500s?	Vlašići on Pag (sv. Jeronima)		On jars of holy oil. Now lost.		
1500s/1600s	Beram (sv. Marije na Škrilinah, južni zid)	ⰕⰑ ⰒⰋⰔⰀⰘ			
1500s/1600s	Gologorica	ⰑⰄⰔⰅⰮⰓⰕⰋ·ⰂⰅⰝⰐⰋⰅ ⰍⰀⰄⰀ·ⰒⰓⰋⰄⰅⰞⰋ· ☩ⰑⰃⰐⰡⰮ☩ⰒⰓⰅⰮⰋⰐⰖ☩	Discovered in the parish priest's house by Ivan Milčetić in September 1908. But previously part of a gravestone in the Crkva sv. Petra.		
1500s/1600s	Hrastovlje (sv. Trojstva)	... ⰕⰑ ⰒⰋⰔⰀ ⰆⰖⰎⰌⰀⰐ ⰆⰀⰍⰀⰐ	Engraver: deacon Žuljan.		
1500s/1600s	Hrastovlje (sv. Trojstva)	ⰔⰂⰅⰕⰀ ⰕⰓⰑⰋⰜⰀ ⰒⰑⰮⰋⰎⰖⰋ ⰐⰀⰔ			
1500s/1600s	Hum (kuća br. 11)	ⰮⰀⰕⰅ ⰮⰓⰍⰑ ⰎⰍⰀ ⰋⰂⰐ	On four stones once owned by Josip Grabar who dug them up in 1973 in his garden near the polača. Originally likely in the belltower. Ligatures: ⰀⰕ, ⰮⰓ, ⰖⰍ.		
1500s/1600s (in/by)	Ivanić Grad?	ⰞⰕeⰗⰀⰐⰬ	Pečatnjak iz Ivanića. On a seal. First described by Milan Mihaljević on 30 August 2016, who learned it was in the possession of an unknown man in Ivanić, either in the Ivanić area or to its south during demining activity (as indicated by the source). (Note: The nearest minefields are over the Kupa in the Petrinja area and over the Sava along the edge of Zrinska gora and Lonjsko Polje).) Present location unknown. The family of the engraver is unknown, though a Frankopan has been argued. (Note: On the evidence of the previous holder of the title Comes de Posaga, the Stephanus (Note: Called "dominus Stephanus Comes de Posaga et de Zala" in the text as given in Ljubić's Listine III pp 371-373.) of the Treaty of Zadar was proposed by Vjekoslav Klaić to have been a Krčki. (Note: See Klaić's Krčki knezovi Frankapani p 157, but he was not the first to make the identification.) And that family is known to have issued Glagolitic documents as early as 1372, (Note: See the grant of Anž Frankopan kept at the Archive of the Franciscan monastery in Ljubljana. Already in 1309, Dujam Frankopan was issuing Glagolitic documents but presumably by another hand.) And if the cross is part of the crest, then it could be of Italian inspiration, which would be consistent with Krčki origins. But the complete absence of the a 6-pointed star already in use by that family generations earlier and the apparent lack of early inland penetration of the heraldic mace/sceptre for non-royal families from the same region (Note: Among the earliest examples is the crest on the 1561 tombstone of Juraj Parixevich photographed by Đuro Griesbach (Strossmayerova galerija SFA-586).) make the Krčki (later Frankopan) family, or even an early date, unlikely. Even the Babonići, whose heraldry is similarly well-attested, only adopted the mace/sceptre as a secondary feature later on, (Note: First attested on the 1571 edition of their crest, but it is held by a lion.) completely absent from their seals. None of the noble families from the Sisak-Moslavina County with known heraldry match this seal. The Knights Hospitaller had possessions near Kloštar Ivanić and elsewhere in the region, and emplyed crosses in their heraldry, but the use of the Glagolitic script among them was limited to a few exceptional individuals. Among the nobility and priesthood, "Štefan" was a common name, and no comprehensive study has been conducted on this seal yet.)		
1500s/1600s	Kastav (sv. Trojstva)	Ⱍ·... ⰕⰓ... ⰕⰑⰕⰖ ... ⰒⰑⰒⰀ ⰮⰋⰘⰅⰎⰀ	Ligatures: ⰕⰓ, ⰕⰑ, ⰕⰖ, ⰒⰑ.		
1500s/1600s	Lovran (sv. Jurja)	ⰍⰋ ⰕⰑ ⰒⰋⰔⰀ ⰒⰓⰅⰁⰋⰂⰀ Ⰲ ⰁⰑⰆⰣ ⰮⰋⰎⰑⰔⰕⰅ ⰂⰀ ⰂⰅⰍⰅ ⰀⰮⰅⰐ	Ligatures: ⰕⰑ, ⰒⰓ, ⰁⰑ, ⰣⰖ, ⰎⰑ, ⰂⰀ		
1500s/1600s	Materada (BDM)	ⰕⰑ [Ⰵ] ⰃⰓⰑⰁ ⰒⰎⰂⰐ	The grave of a parish priest. It was discovered on 8 August 1946 by Branko Fučić in a pile of rubble before the entrance to the graveyard where it had recently been placed as part of the renovation and expansion of the graveyard wall. Ligatures: ⰕⰑ, ⰒⰎⰂ.		
1500s/1600s	Materada (BDM)	ⰋⰂⰀⰐ ⰂⰅⰎⰀ ⰜⰂⰅⰕ...	Once on a stone lintel above the entrance to the nave before the church, destroyed in 1940 when the nave was demolished and the stones used to build the new belltower and expand the sanctuary.		
1500s/1600s	Paz (sv. Vida)	ⰕⰑ ⰒⰋⰔⰀ ⰕⰑ ⰒⰋⰔⰀ	Ligatures: ⰕⰑ.		
1500s/1600s	Prvić Luka (sv. Marije od Milosti)	Ⰱ Ⱇ		(Note: Lipovac)	(Note: ˙)
1500s/1600s	Radovani (sv. Jurja)	ⰕⰑ ⰒⰋⰔⰀⰘ ⰡⰀ ⰒⰓⰅ ⰐⰕⰑⰐ	Engraver: priest Anton. Ligatures: ⰕⰑ.		
1500s/1600s	Radovani (sv. Jurja)	ⰮⰋⰘⰑ ⰍⰑⰞⰀ ⰍⰑⰞⰀ ⰕⰑ ...	Engraver: priest Anton. Ligatures: ⰞⰀ.		
1500s/1600s	Novigrad na Dobri (sv. Marije od Uznesenja)	[Ⰻ?]ⰕⰀ Ⰲ... ?ⰕⰄ [Ⰻ?]? ?... ⰀⰮⰅⰐⰬ	Ligatures: ⰕⰀ, ⰕⰄ, ⰀⰮ.	(Note: Hrabrić)	
1500s/1600s	Šorići (sv. Marije Magdalene)	ⰄⰀ ⰒⰑⰒ ... ⰕⰑ ⰒⰋⰔⰀ ⰒⰅⰓⰋⰛ ⰆⰀⰓⰍⰑⰂⰀⰜ	Engraver: Perić Žarkovac. Ligatures: ⰒⰑ.		
1500s/1600s	Šorići (sv. Marije Magdalene)	ⰕⰑ ⰒⰋⰔⰀ ⰒⰑⰒⰬ ⰞⰕⰓⰀⰒⰋⰛ	Engraver: priest Štrapić. Ligatures: ⰕⰑ, ⰒⰑ, ⰕⰓ, ⰔⰀ, ⰕⰀ.		
1500s/1600s	Šterna (sv. Mihovila)	Ⱑ ⰃⰓⰃⰑⰓ	Kept at the parish church in Šterna. Engraver: Grgor. Ligatures: ⰃⰓⰃ.		(Note: ˙˙˙˙˙)
1500s/1600s	Šušnjevica (kapela na groblju)	...ⰋⰛ Ⱄ......Ⱄ... ⰂⰓⰋⰮⰅ......Ⱁ Ⰰ Ⰲ......ⰂⰋⰜ...			
1500s	Trviž (sv. Petra)	Ⱍ·Ⱇ... ⰘⰞ Ⱂ Ⱑ	On a gravestone in the church. Engraver: pop Jakov/Jadrija.		(Note: ˙˙˙)
1500s/1600s	Višnjan (sv. Antuna pustinjaka)	ⰕⰑ ⰒⰋⰔⰀⰘ ⰡⰀ ⰒⰓⰅ ⰋⰂⰀⰐ ⰓⰀⰄⰀⰐⰑⰂⰋⰛ	Engraver: pre Ivan Radanović. Ligatures: ⰕⰑ, ⰒⰓ, ⰐⰑ.		
1500s-1700s	Assisi (s. Francesco d'Assisi)	ⰍⰖⰆⰄⰋⰎⰋⰛ	Ligatures: ⰆⰄ. Engraver: a certain Kuždilić.		(Note: ˙˙˙˙)
1500s-1700s	Brul near Blatna Vas	Ⱃ ⰕⰓ Ⰼ ⰕⰓ Ⰲ	Discovered in 1999. Ligatures: ⰕⰓ.	(Note: , Valušek (2021) [low res.])	(Note: ˙˙)
1500s-1700s	Brul near Blatna Vas	Ⰼ	Discovered in 1999.	(Note: , Valušek (2021))	(Note: ˙˙)
