= Antonio Machado (Madrid Metro) =

Madrid Metro station

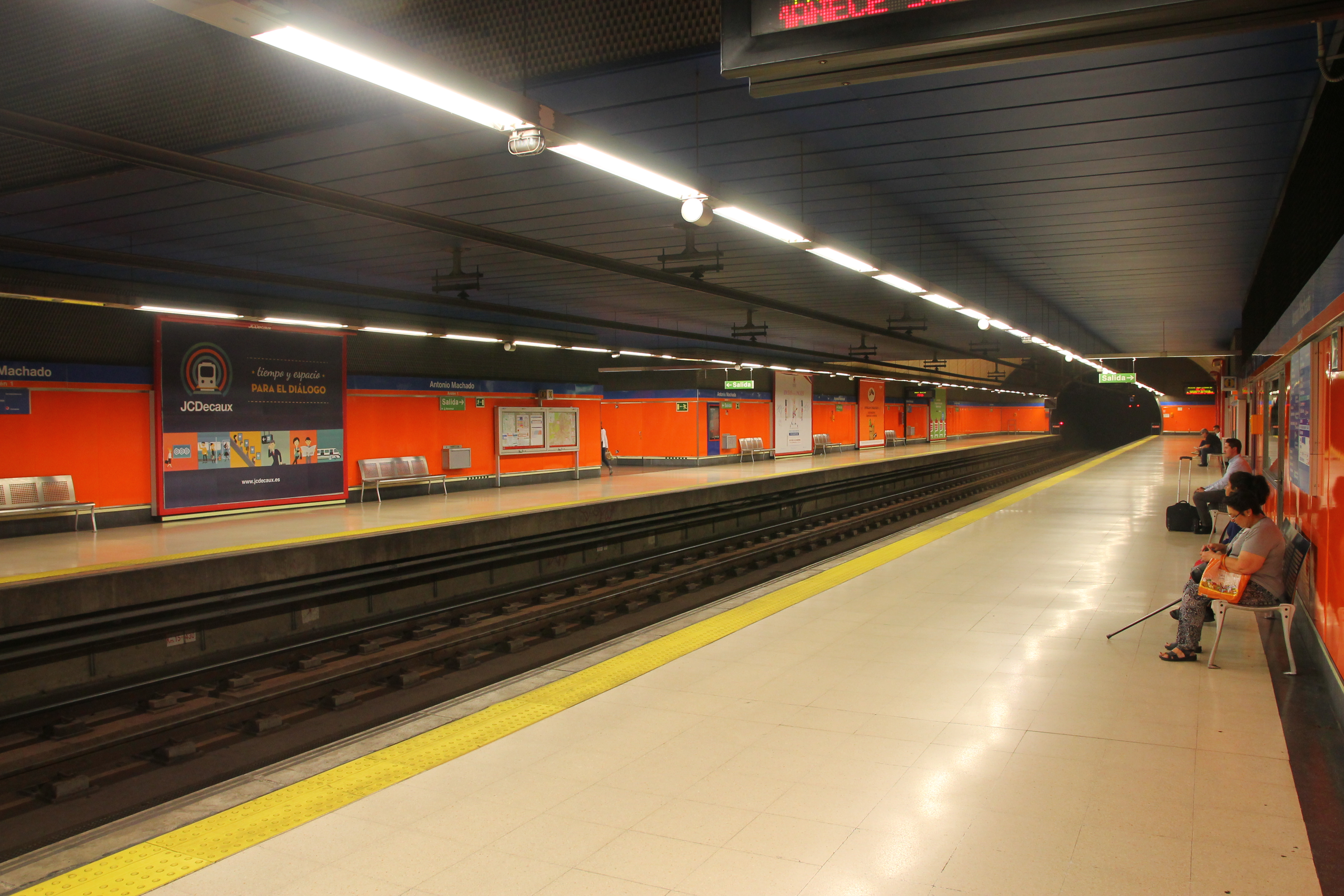
- Antonio Machado Station

General information
- Location: Fuencarral-El Pardo / Moncloa-Aravaca, Madrid; Spain
- Coordinates: 40.4702206°N 3.7176971°W
- System: Madrid Metro station
- Owner: CRTM
- Operator: CRTM

Construction
- Accessible: yes

Other information
- Fare zone: A

History
- Opened: 29 March 1999; 27 years ago

Services
| Preceding station | Madrid Metro | Following station |
|---|---|---|
| Valdezarza towards Hospital del Henares | Line 7 | Peñagrande towards Pitis |
Location
- Location within Madrid

Antonio Machado [anˈtonjo maˈtʃaðo] is a station on Line 7 of the Madrid Metro, near the Calle de Antonio Machado (named for the poet Antonio Machado, 1875–1939). It is located in fare Zone A. This station close to the street of the same name, in the Valdezarza neighborhood (Moncloa-Aravaca district). It also serves the Peñagrande neighborhood (Fuencarral-El Pardo district). The station opened to the public on 29 March 1999.
