= Valdezarza (Madrid Metro) =

Madrid Metro station

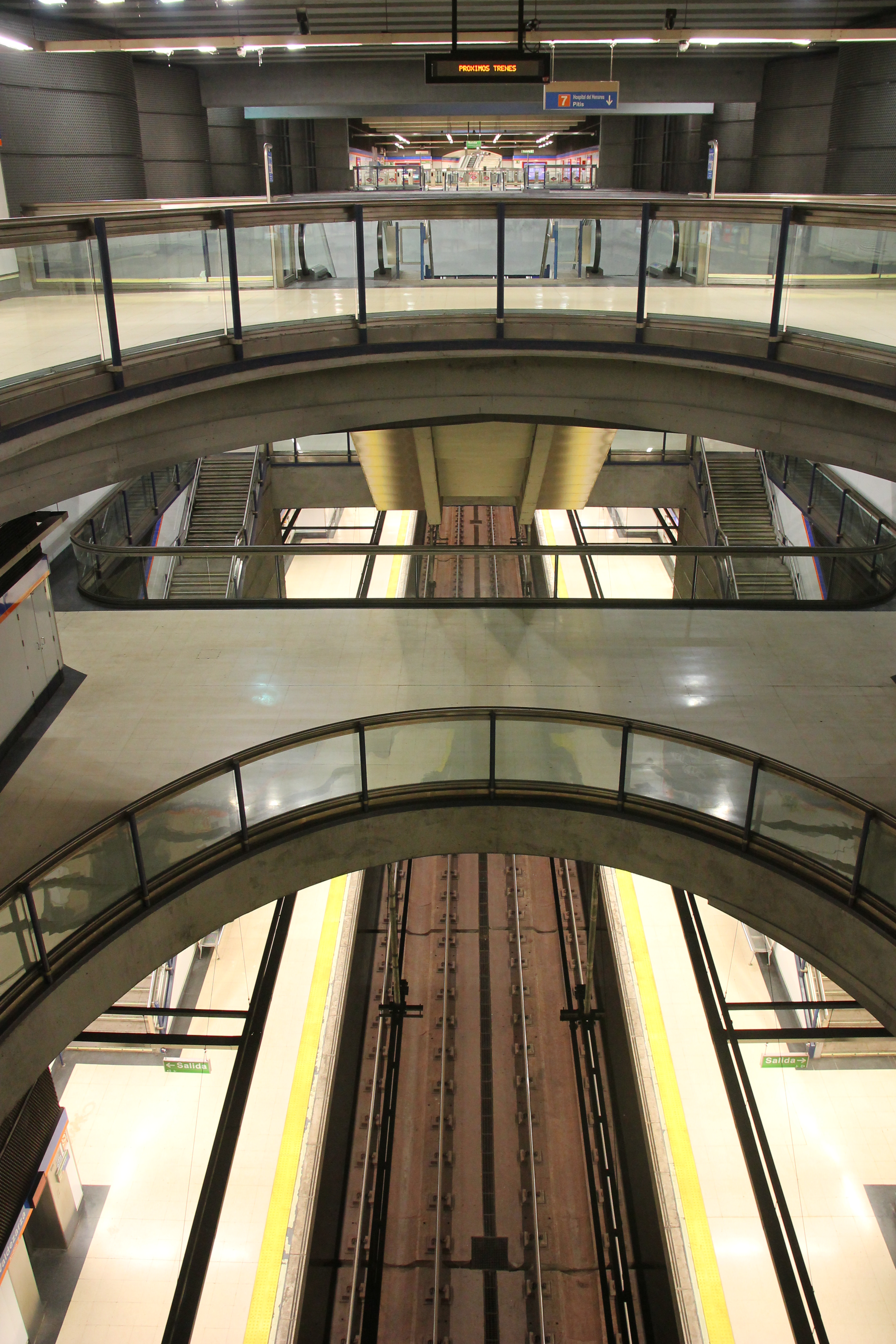

General information
- Location: Moncloa-Aravaca, Madrid; Spain
- Coordinates: 40.4648258°N 3.7159766°W
- System: Madrid Metro station
- Owner: CRTM
- Operator: CRTM

Construction
- Accessible: yes

Other information
- Fare zone: A

History
- Opened: 12 February 1999; 27 years ago

Services
Preceding station	Madrid Metro	Following station
Francos Rodríguez towards Hospital del Henares	Line 7	Antonio Machado towards Pitis
Location
- Location within Madrid

Valdezarza [baldeˈθaɾθa] is a station on Line 7 of the Madrid Metro, serving the Valdezarza barrio. It is located in fare Zone A.
