= Pueblo Nuevo (Madrid Metro) =

Madrid Metro station

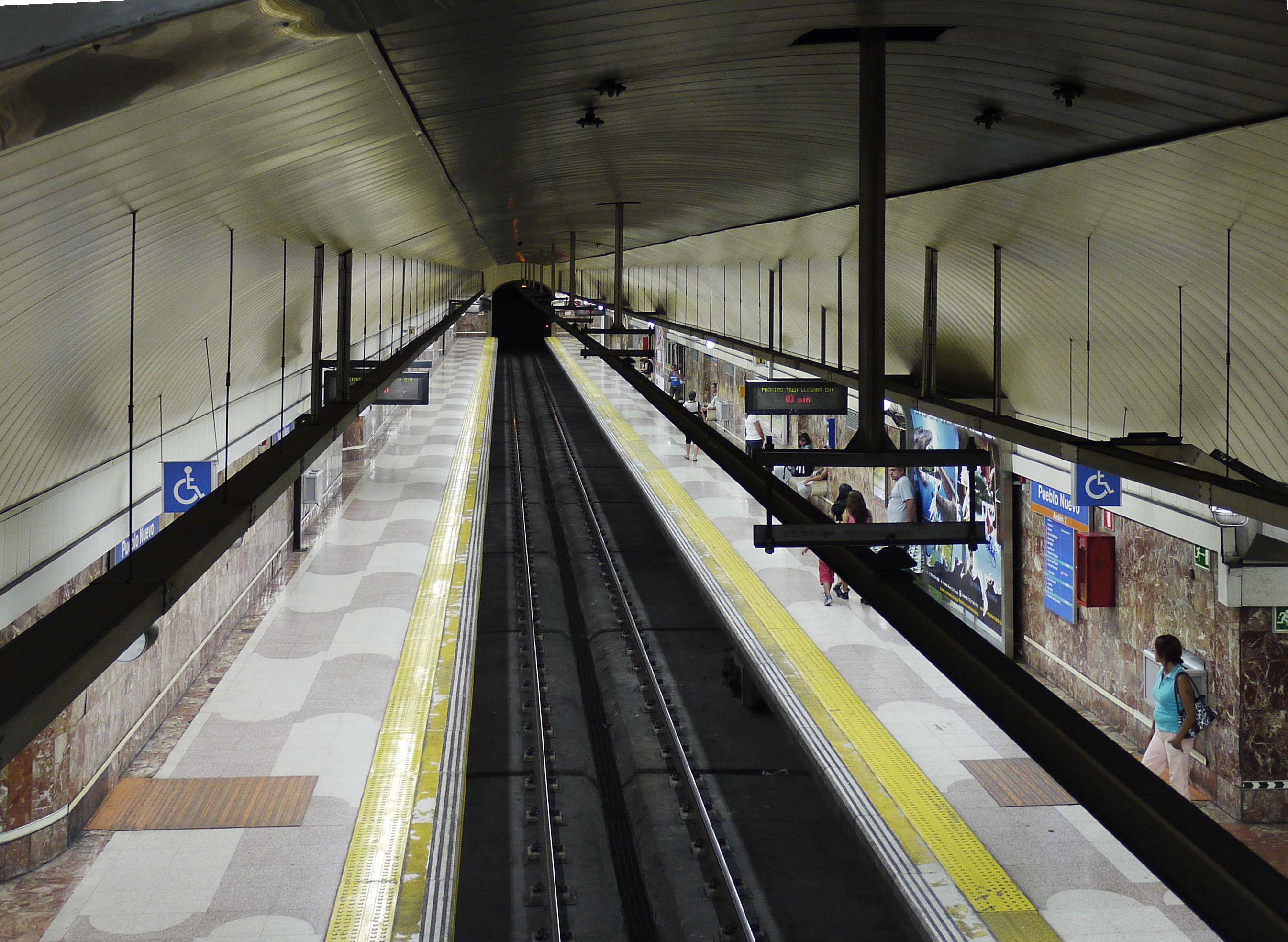

General information
- Location: Ciudad Lineal, Madrid; Spain
- Coordinates: 40.4356962°N 3.6428288°W
- System: Madrid Metro station
- Owner: CRTM
- Operator: CRTM

Construction
- Accessible: yes

Other information
- Fare zone: A

History
- Opened: 28 May 1964

Services
Preceding station	Madrid Metro	Following station
Ciudad Lineal towards Alameda de Osuna	Line 5	Quintana towards Casa de Campo
Ascao towards Hospital del Henares	Line 7	Barrio de la Concepción towards Pitis
Location
- Location within Madrid

Pueblo Nuevo [ˈpweβlo ˈnweβo] is a station on Line 5 and Line 7 of the Madrid Metro, serving the Pueblo Nuevo ("New Town") barrio. It is located in fare Zone A.
