= Barrio del Puerto (Madrid Metro) =

Madrid Metro station

General information
- Location: 1st district of Coslada, Madrid; Spain
- Coordinates: 40.4224957°N 3.5691925°W
- System: Madrid Metro station
- Owner: CRTM
- Operator: CRTM

Construction
- Accessible: yes

Other information
- Fare zone: B1

History
- Opened: 5 May 2007; 19 years ago

Services
Preceding station	Madrid Metro	Following station
Coslada Central towards Hospital del Henares	Line 7	Estadio Metropolitano towards Pitis
Location
- Location within Madrid

Barrio del Puerto [ˈbarjo ðel ˈpweɾto] is a station on Line 7 of the Madrid Metro, named for the Barrio del Puerto ("Barrio of the Gate") neighbourhood. It is located in fare Zone B1.
