= Avenida de la Ilustración (Madrid Metro) =

Madrid Metro station

- Platforms of the station

General information
- Location: Fuencarral-El Pardo, Madrid; Spain
- Coordinates: 40.4800991°N 3.7184039°W
- System: Madrid Metro station
- Owner: CRTM
- Operator: CRTM

Construction
- Accessible: yes

Other information
- Fare zone: A

History
- Opened: 29 March 1999; 27 years ago

Services
Preceding station	Madrid Metro	Following station
Peñagrande towards Hospital del Henares	Line 7	Lacoma towards Pitis
Location
- Location within Madrid

Avenida de la Ilustración [aβeˈniða ðe la jlustɾaˈθjon] is a station on Line 7 of the Madrid Metro, on the Avenida de la Ilustración ("Enlightenment Avenue," named for Puerta de la Ilustración, 'Gate of Enlightenment', a 1990 steel monument by Andreu Alfaro). It is located in fare Zone A.
