= Barrio de la Concepción (Madrid Metro) =

Madrid Metro station

- Platforms of the station

General information
- Location: Ciudad Lineal, Madrid; Spain
- Coordinates: 40.4390955°N 3.6519981°W
- System: Madrid Metro station
- Owner: CRTM
- Operator: CRTM

Construction
- Accessible: yes

Other information
- Fare zone: A

History
- Opened: 17 March 1975; 51 years ago

Services
Preceding station	Madrid Metro	Following station
Pueblo Nuevo towards Hospital del Henares	Line 7	Parque de las Avenidas towards Pitis
Location
- Location within Madrid

Barrio de la Concepción [ˈbarjo ðe la konθeβˈθjon] is a station on Madrid Metro Line No. 7 in the district of Ciudad Lineal, serving the barrio of Concepción.

It is also near the M-30 motorway and ten minutes from Madrid-Barajas Airport. The station opened to the public on 17 May 1975 with the second section of the line between Pueblo Nuevo and Avenida de América and was renovated in 2006 to change the vaults and walls.
