= Estadio Metropolitano (Madrid Metro) =

Madrid Metro station

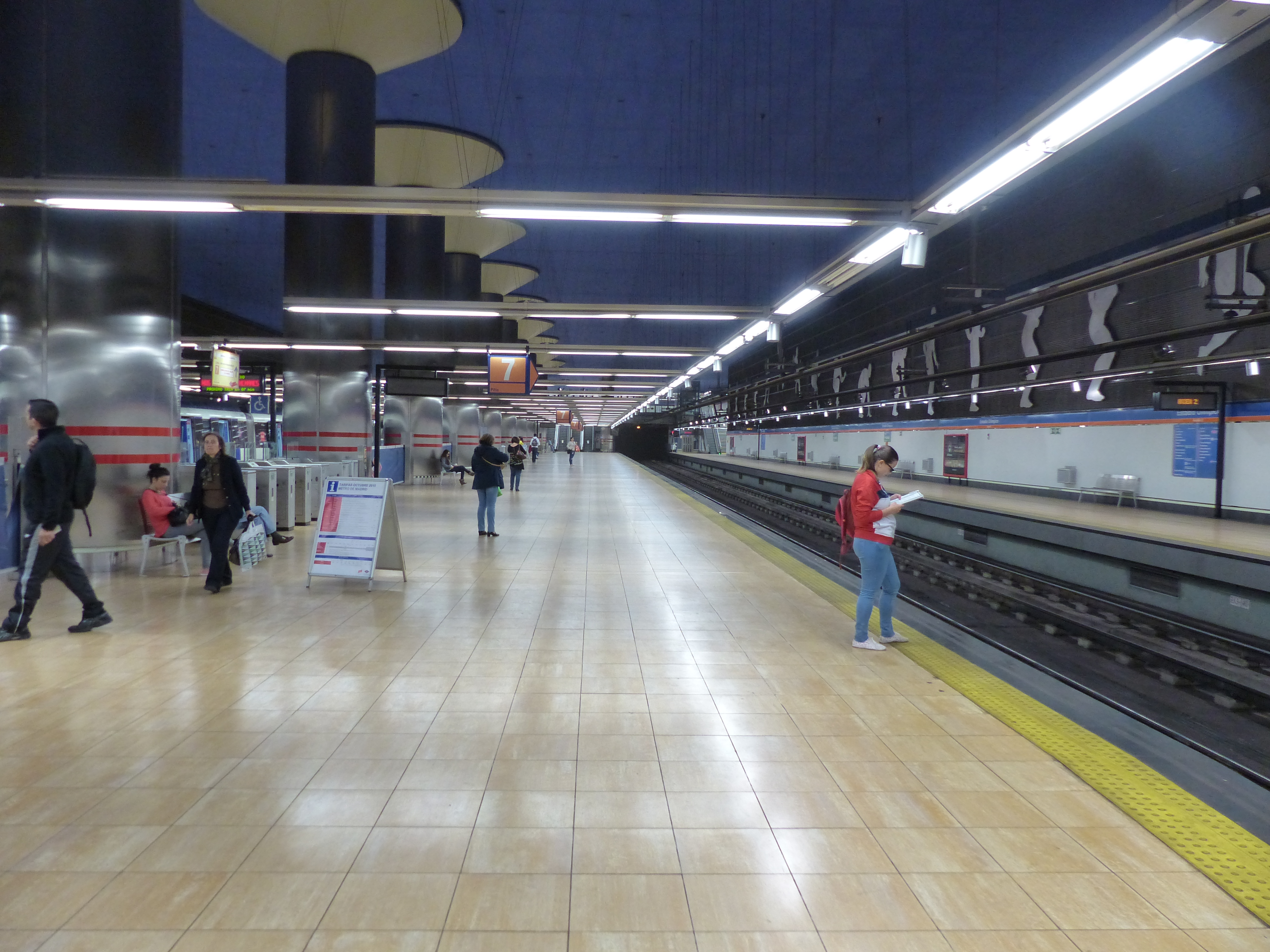

General information
- Location: San Blas, Madrid; Spain
- Coordinates: 40.4333937°N 3.6001502°W
- System: Madrid Metro station
- Owner: CRTM
- Operator: CRTM

Construction
- Accessible: yes

Other information
- Fare zone: A

History
- Opened: 5 May 2007; 19 years ago

Services
Preceding station	Madrid Metro	Following station
Barrio del Puerto towards Hospital del Henares	Line 7	Las Musas towards Pitis
Location
- Location within Madrid

Estadio Metropolitano ([esˈtaðjo metɾopoliˈtano], formerly Estadio Olímpico) is a station on Line 7 of the Madrid Metro. It is located in fare Zone A. Passengers going eastbound to stations beyond this station will have to change trains from line 7A to 7B using the island platform, the same situation happens for those coming from the towns of Coslada and San Fernando.

== History ==
The station opened on 5 May 2007 as part of the extension to the towns of Coslada and San Fernando, it was built to serve the nearby La Peineta Stadium. It was renamed from Estadio Olímpico to Estadio Metropolitano in June 2017, coinciding with the opening of the new Metropolitano Stadium.

== Gallery ==
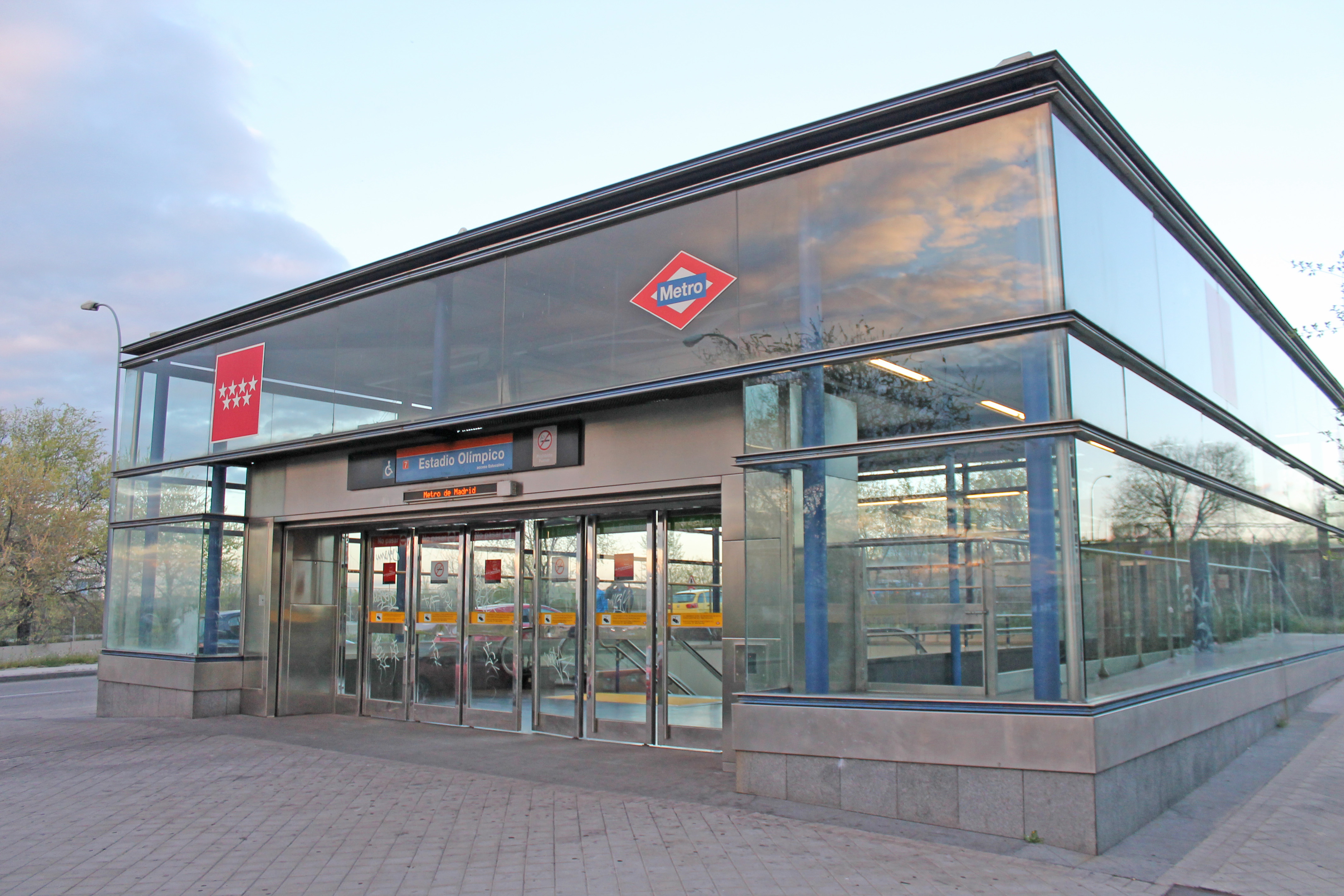
Entrance with former name Estadio Olímpico

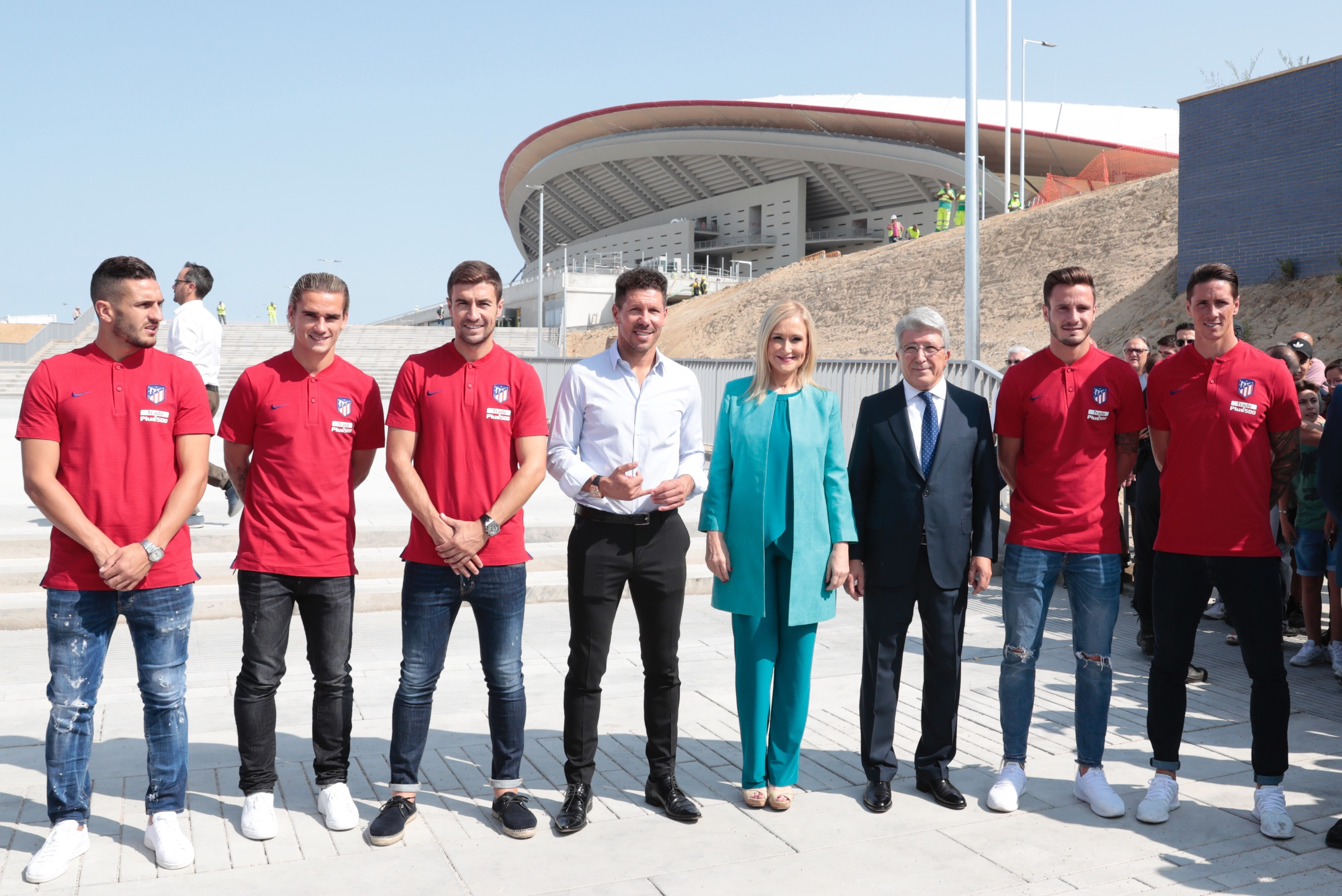
Ingauration of the new access...

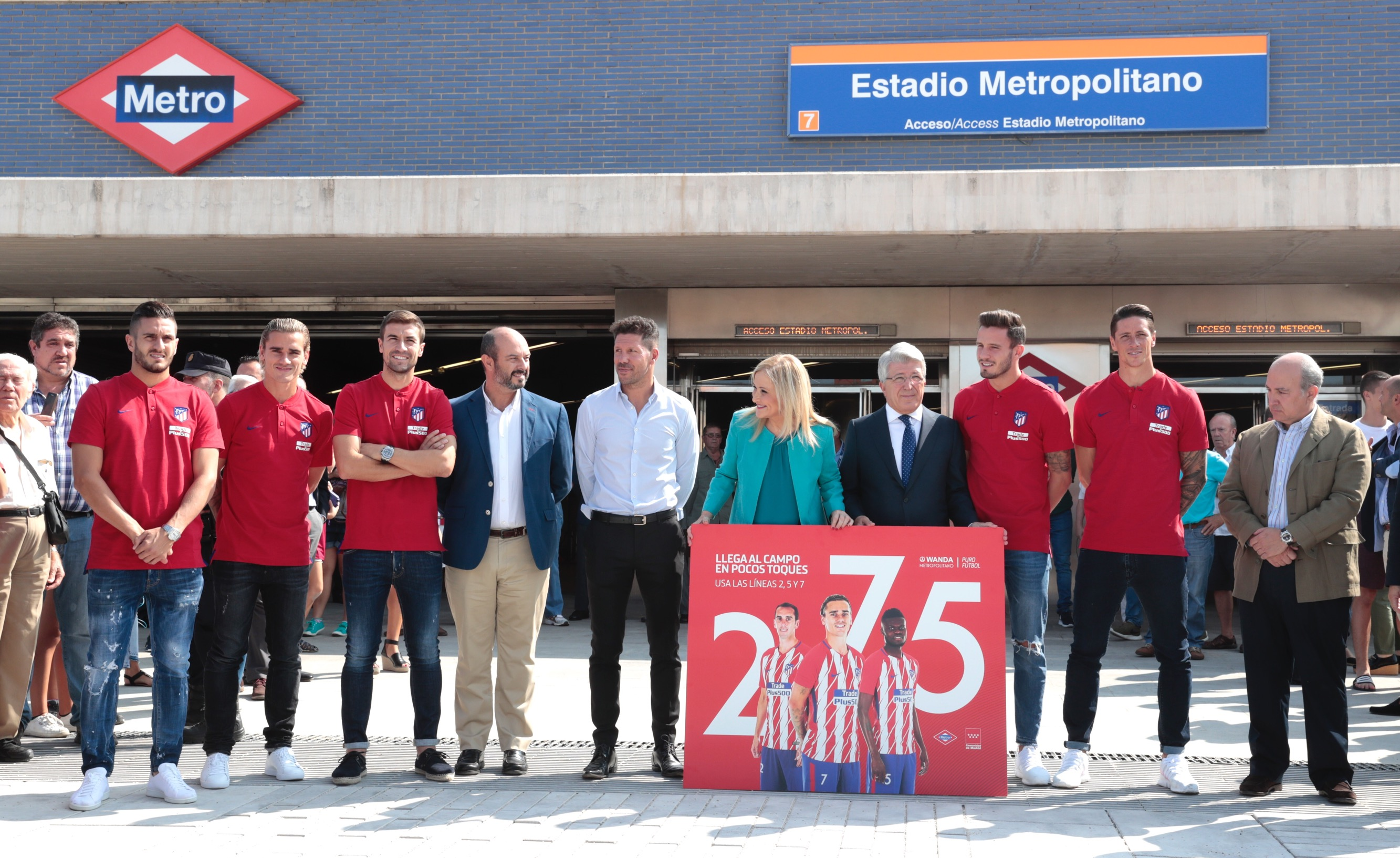
...and the rename of the station 2017

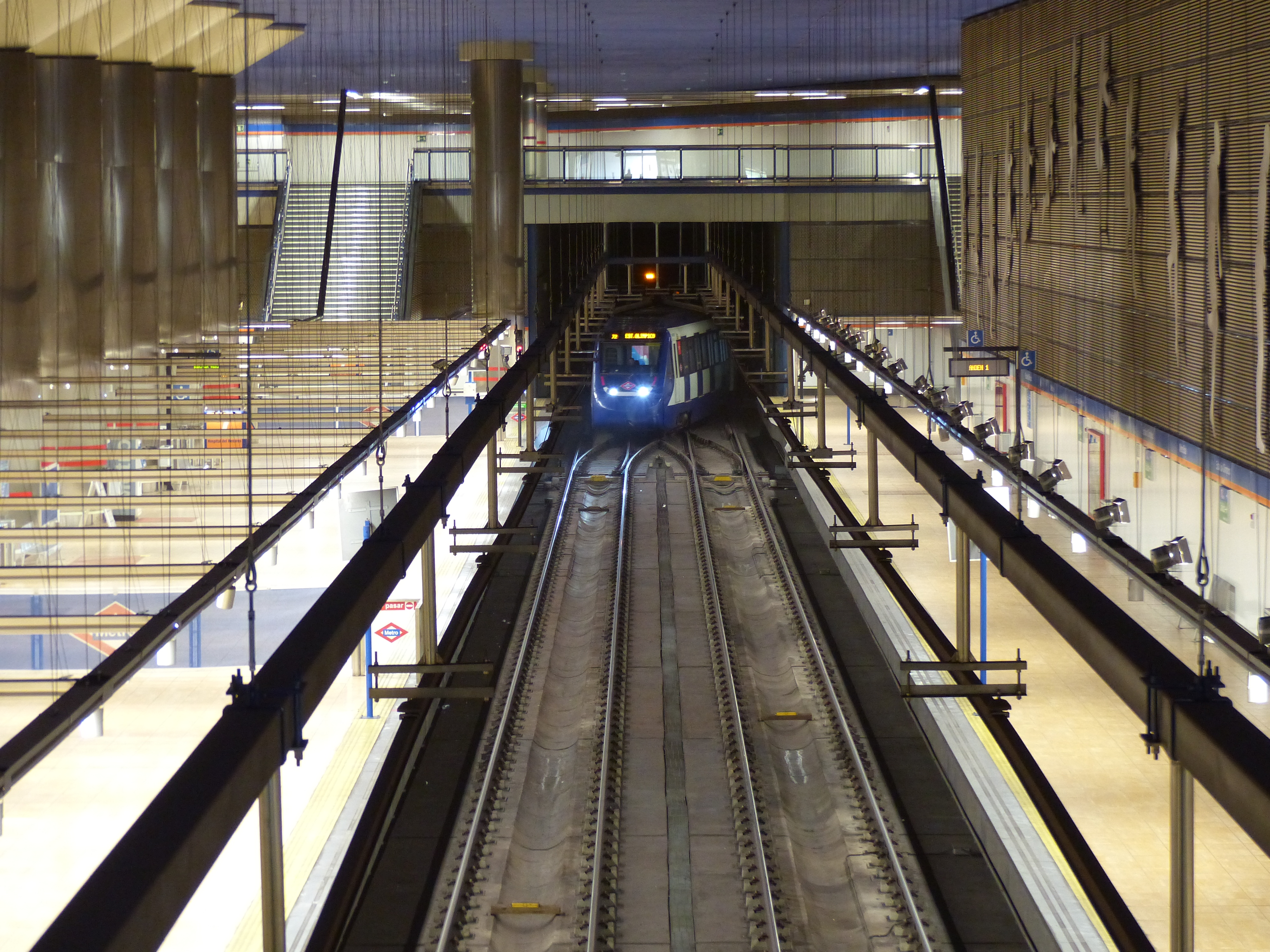
Platform

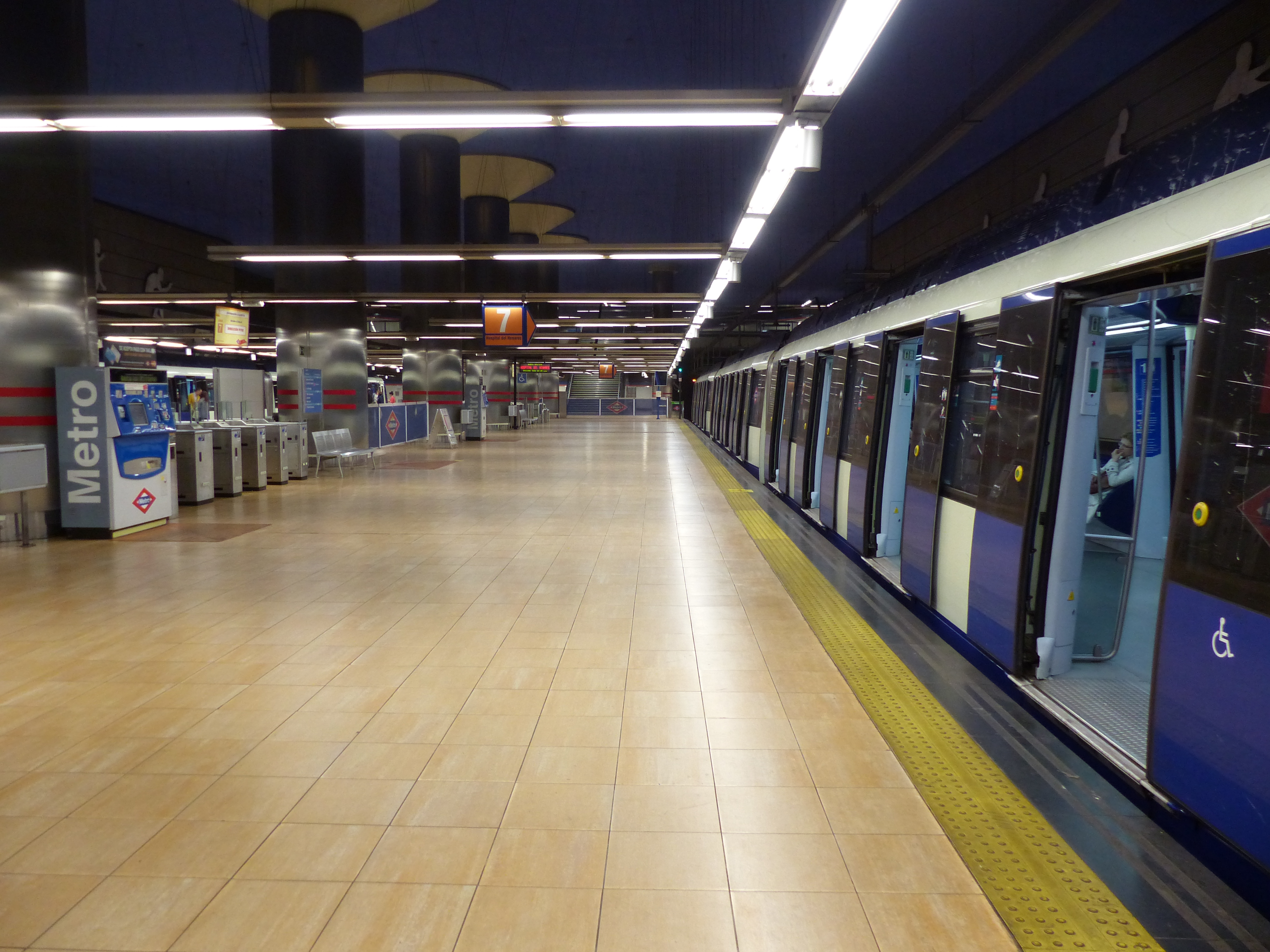
Train in the station
