= Arroyofresno (Madrid Metro) =

Madrid Metro station

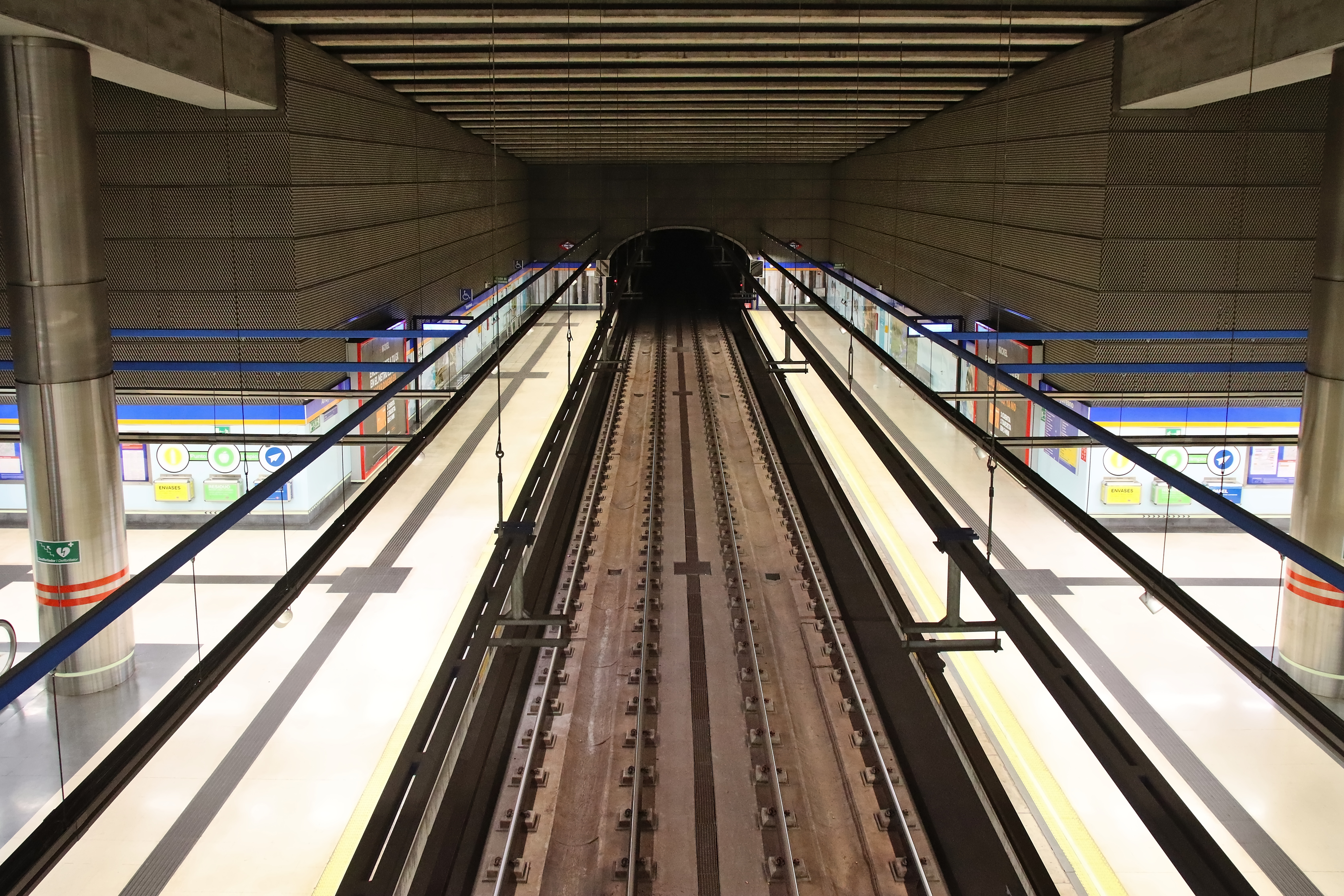
- Platforms of the station

General information
- Location: Fuencarral-El Pardo, Madrid; Spain
- System: Metro station
- Operator: Madrid Metro
- Line: Line 7

Construction
- Accessible: yes

History
- Opened: 23 March 2019; 7 years ago

Services
Preceding station	Madrid Metro	Following station
Lacoma towards Hospital del Henares	Line 7	Pitis Terminus
Location

Arroyofresno [aroʝoˈfɾesno] is a station on Line 7 of the Madrid Metro. It is located in fare Zone A.

Completed in 1999 under the name "Arroyo del Fresno" (serving the barrio of that name, literally "Ash brook"), the station did not open to the public for many years due to the lack of development in the area.

With developments being built nearby, this station opened to public on 23 March 2019.

== History ==
The station was built along with six other stations as part of the expansion of Line 7 from Valdezarza to Pitis. The expansion cost 25 billion pesetas (150 million euros) and was completed in 1999, two months before the regional elections.
