= García Noblejas (Madrid Metro) =

Madrid Metro station

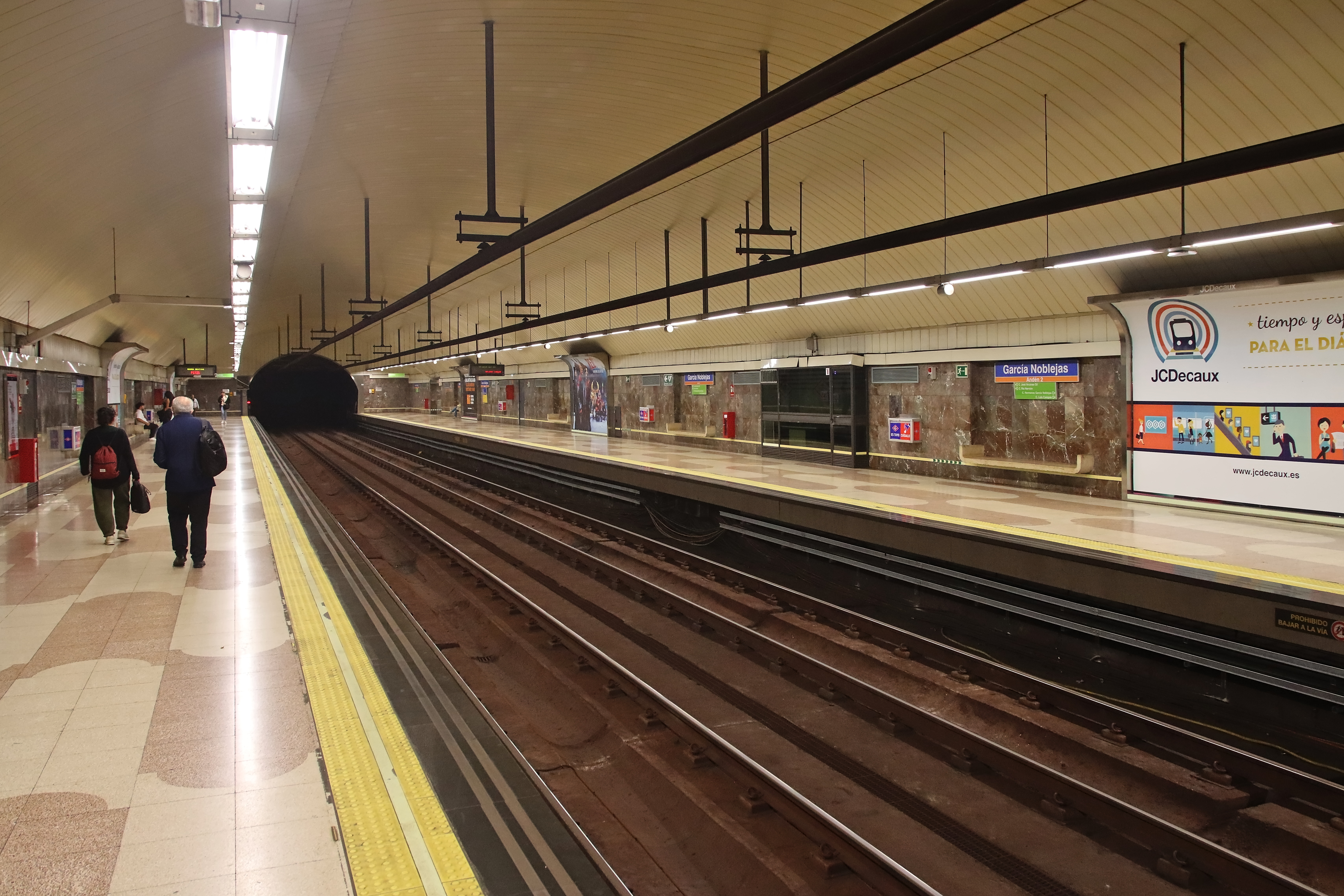

General information
- Location: Ciudad Lineal, Madrid; Spain
- Coordinates: 40.4284244°N 3.633304°W
- System: Madrid Metro station
- Owner: CRTM
- Operator: CRTM

Construction
- Accessible: No

Other information
- Fare zone: A

History
- Opened: 17 July 1974; 52 years ago

Services
Preceding station	Madrid Metro	Following station
Simancas towards Hospital del Henares	Line 7	Ascao towards Pitis
Location
- Location within Madrid

García Noblejas [ɡaɾˈθi.a noˈβlexas] is a station on Line 7 of the Madrid Metro, on the Calle de los Hermanos García Noblejas ("Street of the García-Noblejas brothers," named for two Falangist leaders). It is located in fare Zone A.
