= Ascao (Madrid Metro) =

Madrid Metro station

- Platforms of the station

General information
- Location: Ciudad Lineal, Madrid; Spain
- Coordinates: 40.4302016°N 3.6410544°W
- System: Madrid Metro station
- Owner: CRTM
- Operator: CRTM

Construction
- Accessible: No

Other information
- Fare zone: A

History
- Opened: 17 July 1974; 52 years ago

Services
Preceding station	Madrid Metro	Following station
García Noblejas towards Hospital del Henares	Line 7	Pueblo Nuevo towards Pitis
Location
- Location within Madrid

Ascao [asˈkao] is a station on Line 7 of the Madrid Metro, located under the Calle de Ascao. It is located in fare Zone A.
