= San Blas (Madrid Metro) =

Madrid Metro station

- Platforms of the station

General information
- Location: San Blas, Madrid; Spain
- Coordinates: 40.427989°N 3.6154635°W
- System: Madrid Metro station
- Owner: CRTM
- Operator: CRTM

Construction
- Accessible: No

Other information
- Fare zone: A

History
- Opened: 17 July 1974; 52 years ago

Services
Preceding station	Madrid Metro	Following station
Las Musas towards Hospital del Henares	Line 7	Simancas towards Pitis
Location
- Location within Madrid

San Blas [ˈsam ˈblas] is a station on Line 7 of the Madrid Metro, serving the San Blas-Canillejas barrio. It is located in fare Zone A.
