= Simancas (Madrid Metro) =

Madrid Metro station

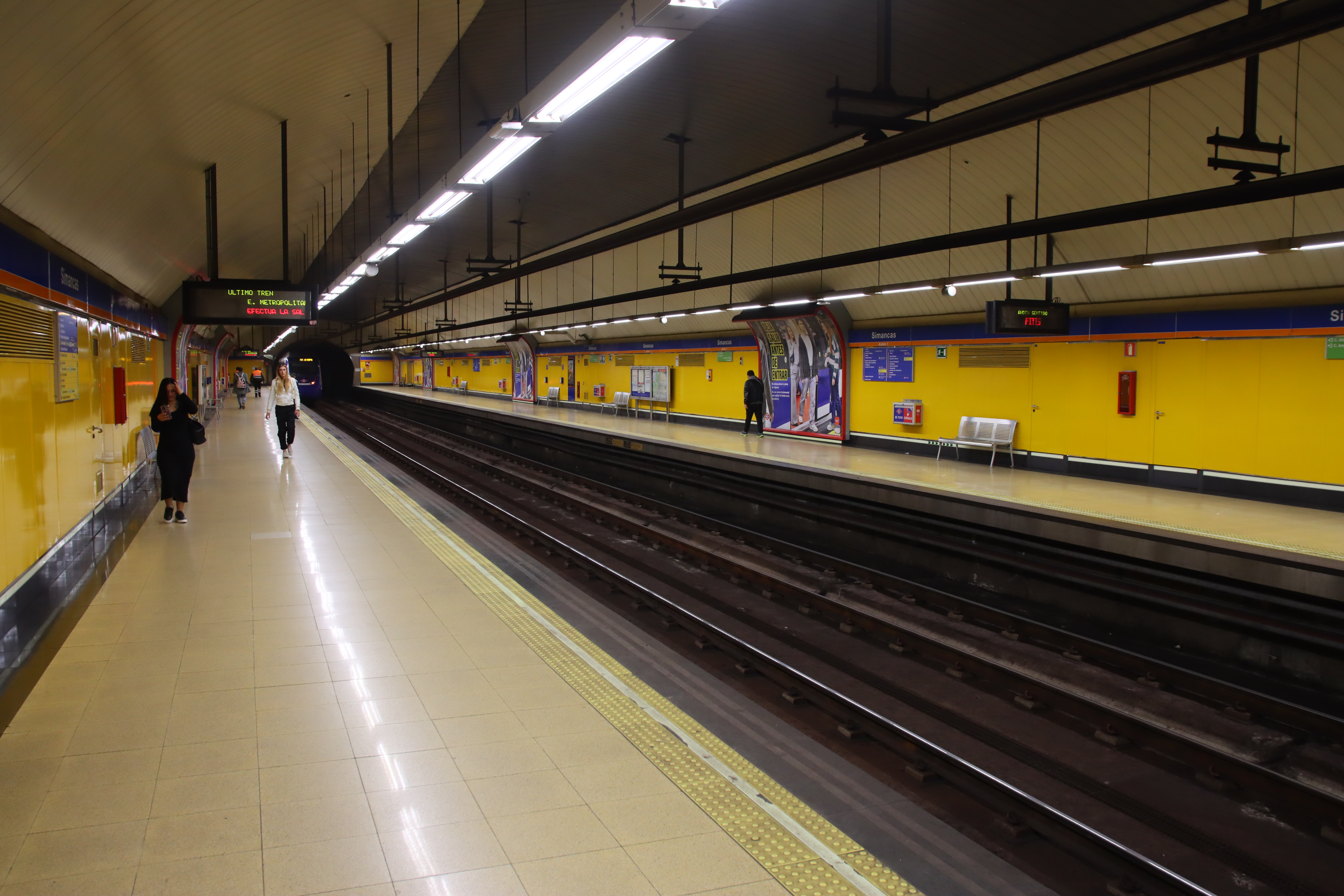

General information
- Location: San Blas, Madrid; Spain
- Coordinates: 40.4279879°N 3.6257196°W
- System: Madrid Metro station
- Owner: CRTM
- Operator: CRTM

Construction
- Accessible: No

Other information
- Fare zone: A

History
- Opened: 17 July 1974; 52 years ago

Services
Preceding station	Madrid Metro	Following station
San Blas towards Hospital del Henares	Line 7	García Noblejas towards Pitis
Location
- Location within Madrid

Simancas [siˈmaŋkas] is a station on Line 7 of the Madrid Metro, serving the Simancas barrio. It is located in fare Zone A.
