= Metropolitano Stadium =

Stadium in Madrid, Spain

Coordinates: 40°26′10″N 3°35′58″W

Riyadh Air Metropolitano
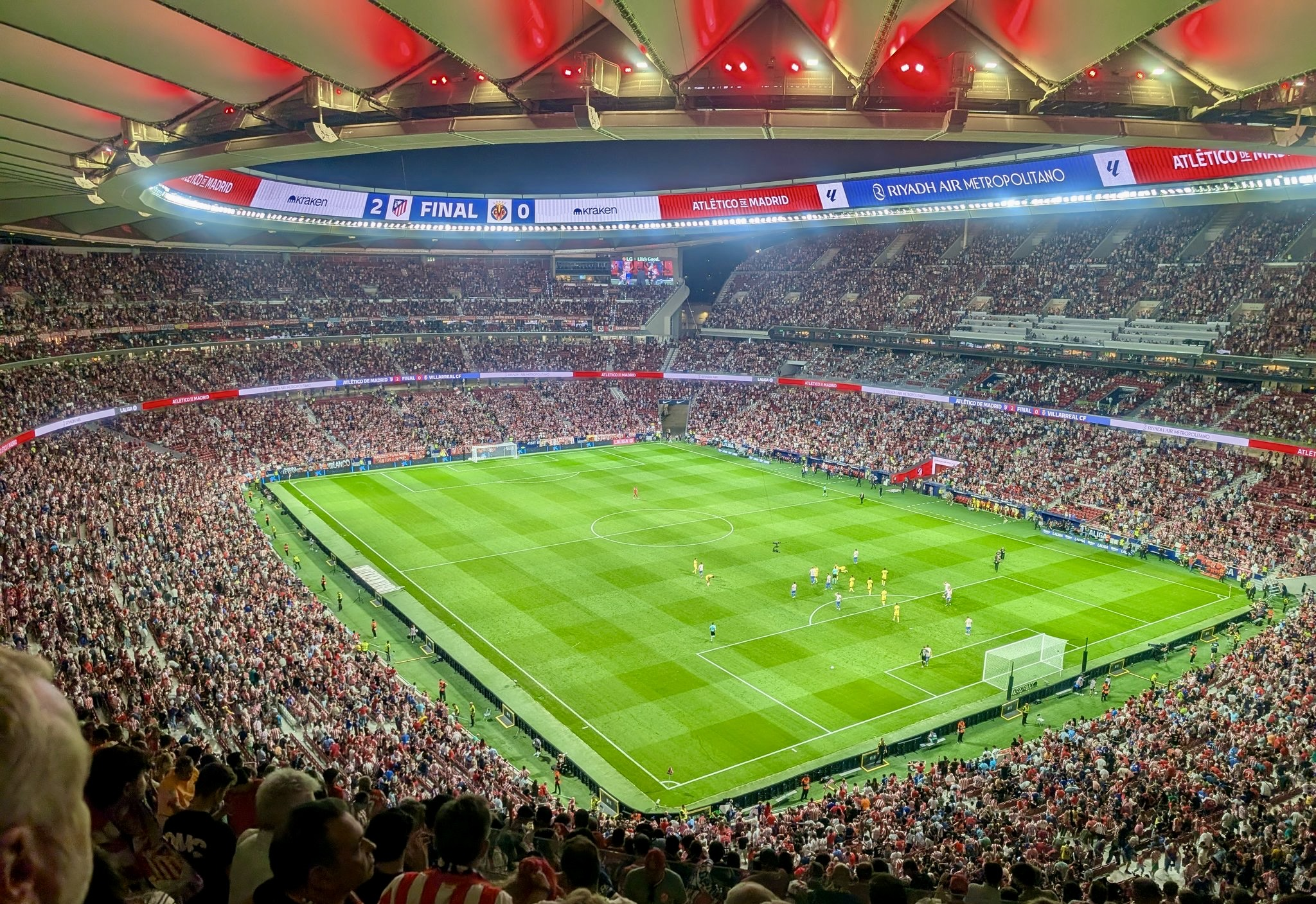
- UEFA
- Interactive map of Riyadh Air Metropolitano
- Former names: Wanda Metropolitano (2017–2022); Cívitas Metropolitano (2022–2024)
- Location: Madrid, Spain
- Owner: Community of Madrid (1992–2002); City of Madrid (2002–2017); Atlético Madrid (2017–present)
- Operator: Atlético Madrid
- Capacity: 70,813 (football); 60,000 (concerts)
- Surface: Grass
- Record attendance: 70,514 vs Real Madrid (20 September 2026)
- Field size: 105 m × 68 m (115 yd × 74 yd)
- Public transit: at Estadio Metropolitano

Construction
- Built: 1990–93
- Opened: 6 September 1994; 32 years ago
- Renovated: 2017; 9 years ago
- Closed: 2004; 22 years ago
- Reopened: 16 September 2017; 9 years ago
- Cost: €42 million (1994) €240 million (2017)
- Architect: Cruz y Ortiz Arquitectos
- Main contractor: FCC

Tenants
- Atlético Madrid (2017–present); Rayo Majadahonda (2018); Spain national football team (selected matches)

Website
- Riyadh Air Metropolitano

The Metropolitano Stadium (Spanish: Estadio Metropolitano), officially referred to as Riyadh Air Metropolitano Stadium due to sponsorship, is a football stadium in Madrid, located in the Rosas neighbourhood in the San Blas-Canillejas district. It has been the home stadium of Atlético Madrid since 2017.

The original stadium was built as part of Madrid's unsuccessful bid to host the 1997 World Athletics Championships, and was opened on 6 September 1994 by the Community of Madrid. It was closed in 2004 due to the city's unsuccessful bid for the 2016 Olympics and in 2013 it passed into the possession of Atlético Madrid. The stadium was rebuilt and the new facility was reopened to the public on 16 September 2017, when Atlético Madrid faced Málaga in La Liga. The stadium had a capacity of 20,000 spectators upon its closure and re-opened with a seating capacity of 68,456 after it was rebuilt. By September 2023, this had been extended to a capacity of 70,460. The capacity then increased to 70,692 with the creation of two skyboxes, expanded VIP seatings, and an additional platform for persons with disabilities. In 2026, the capacity increased again, having now 70,813 seats.

The stadium hosted the 2019 UEFA Champions League final on 1 June 2019 and will host the 2027 UEFA Champions League final It is one of the potential host venues for the 2030 FIFA World Cup.

== Name ==
The stadium was formerly known as Estadio de la Comunidad de Madrid (Community of Madrid Stadium), Estadio Olímpico de Madrid (Madrid Olympic Stadium), and more commonly by its nickname Estadio de La Peineta (The Comb Stadium). In 2016, naming rights were acquired by the Wanda Group, a Chinese real estate company. Following the expiration of the deal with the Wanda Group at the end of 2021–22 season, Cívitas Pacensis, a real estate firm, became the naming rights partner. On 9 October 2024, Riyadh Air, Saudi Arabia's second flag carrier and Atlético's sponsor, became the naming rights partner. Due to UEFA sponsorship regulations the stadium is known as Estadio Metropolitano in UEFA marketing materials.

== History ==
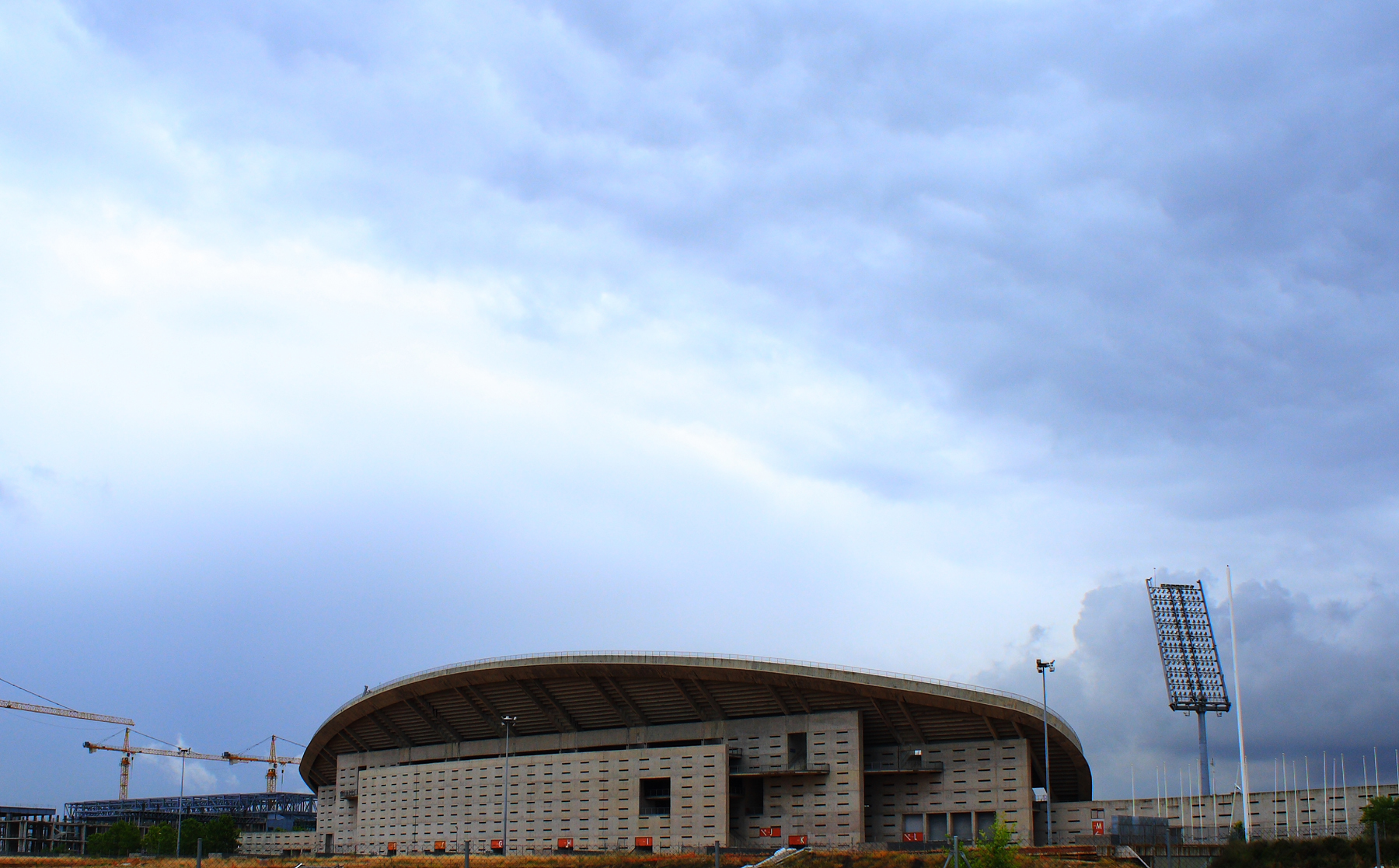
Estadio La Peineta before reconstruction

During the early 1990s, the Sports Council of the Community of Madrid promoted the city's bid to host the World Athletics Championships in 1997. The preparations began for a stadium in eastern Madrid, next to the M-40 motorway and close to the Madrid–Barajas Airport.

Construction of the new stadium began in 1990 and was based on a design proposed by Cruz y Ortiz. It was completed in November 1993 at a cost of €42 million, and the inauguration took place in September 1994 in front of then IOC president Juan Antonio Samaranch, then Community of Madrid president Joaquín Leguina, and then mayor of Madrid José María Álvarez del Manzano. The single seating tier stadium with a capacity of 20,000 seats became known as La Peineta (the comb) because of its similarity with a traditional hair comb.

The 1997 World Championships in Athletics were eventually awarded to Athens in 1995, and La Peineta was used for minor sports and cultural events during the first decade of its existence.

== New stadium ==
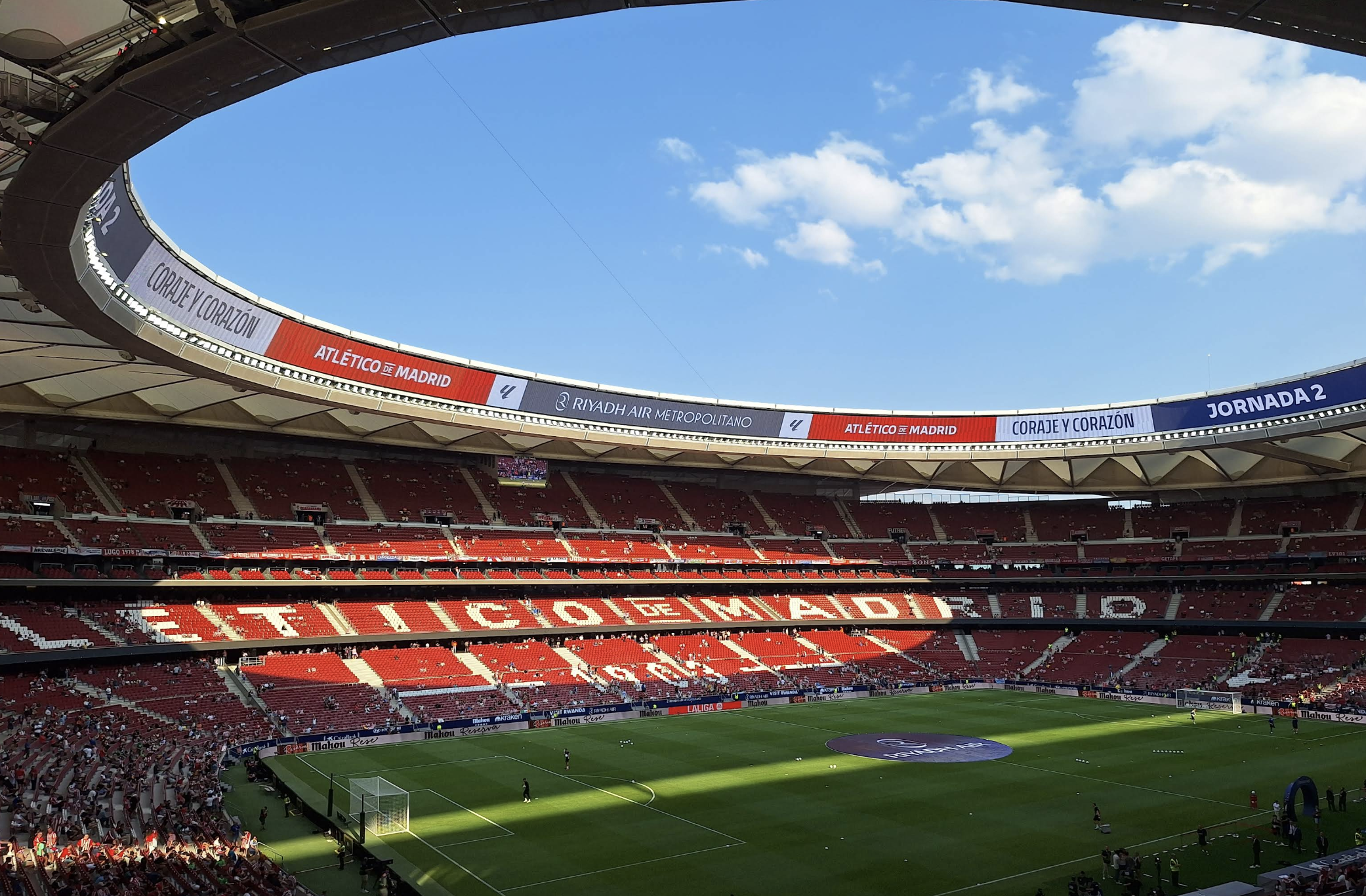
360° screen installed in 2025

In 2004, the stadium was closed for a future project upon the Madrid bid for the 2012 Olympics. The following year, the bid failed. In December 2008, Atlético's president Enrique Cerezo and mayor of Madrid Alberto Ruiz-Gallardón signed an agreement indicating that Atlético Madrid would eventually move to the stadium in the following years and for the renovations to begin. The club was initially supposed to move to the new stadium in 2013, but this was pushed back numerous times due to Olympic bids and the economic crisis.

Following another defeat of Madrid's Olympic bid in 2009, this time for the 2016 Olympics, many proposals were made for the future use of the stadium. In November 2011, the first demolition works were carried out at the stadium. In Spring 2012, more works were carried out, this time with the removal of the lower seating tier and the removal of the athletics track.

Madrid made a bid again for the 2020 Olympics, which failed as well in September 2013. A few days after the 125th IOC Session, on 11 September 2013, Atlético Madrid announced their plans to build a stadium on the location of La Peineta, and ownership was officially transferred to the club.

The new stadium was scheduled to replace the Vicente Calderón Stadium as Atletico's home for the 2017–18 season. On 9 December 2016, the club announced that the renovated stadium's official name would be Wanda Metropolitano – Wanda for sponsorship reasons and Metropolitano after the 1923–1966 arena which hosted Atlético's matches before Vicente Calderón. In March 2017, the club officially bought the stadium from the City Council of Madrid for €30.4 million. As of 15 April 2017, around 48,500 season tickets had been reserved by the club fans.

On 16 September 2017, the Estadio Metropolitano's inaugural event was a 2017–18 La Liga match between Atlético Madrid and Málaga. King Felipe VI of Spain attended the match. Atlético's Antoine Griezmann scored the first goal at the new stadium, as Atlético won 1–0. On 27 September 2017, the Metropolitano hosted its first European game as Chelsea beat Atlético Madrid 2–1 and became the first English club to defeat them at home in any European club competition, as well as the first visiting team to win at the new stadium.

The stadium was also the first 100% LED stadium in the world.

== Notable events ==
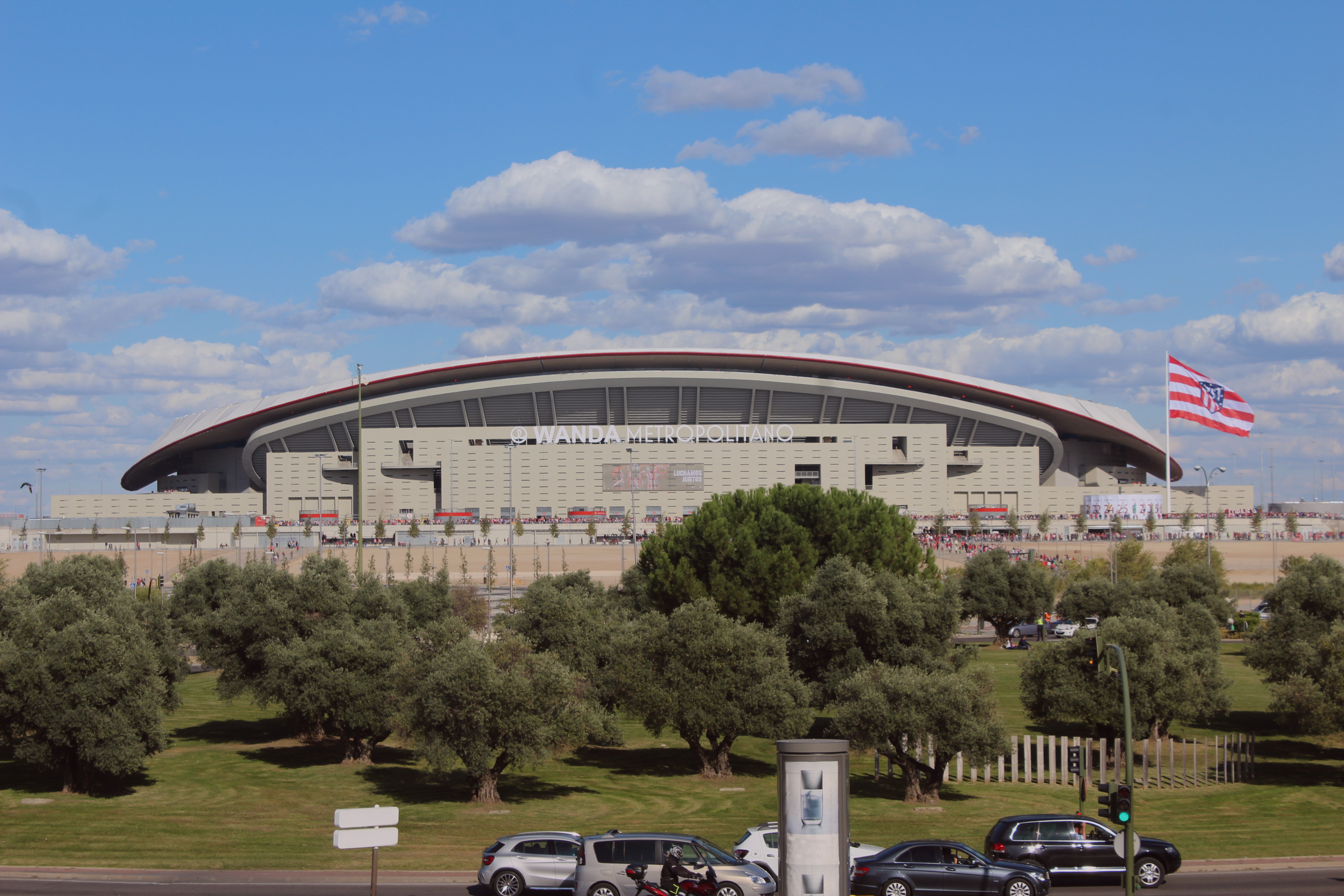
Exterior view of the stadium at the inauguration day

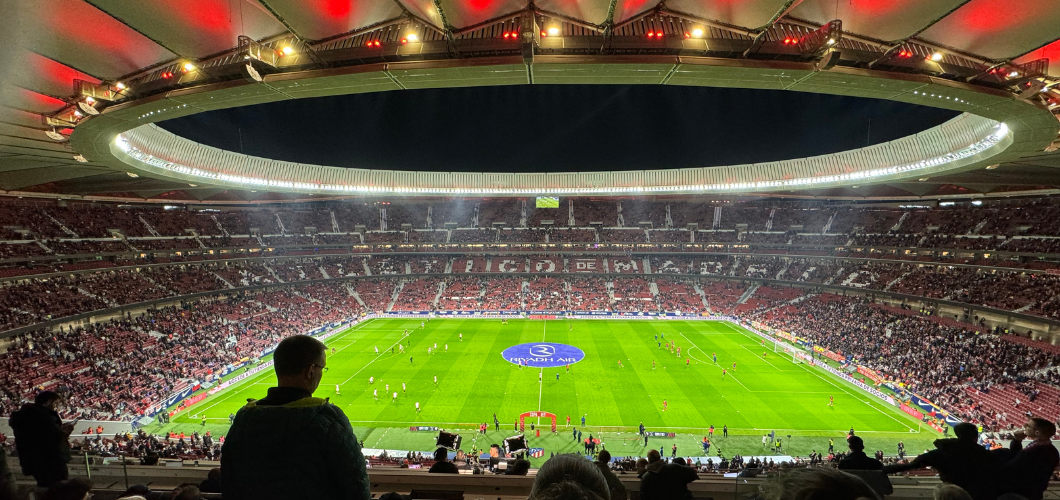
Estadio Metropolitano, Madrid

La Peineta hosted the second leg of the 1996 Supercopa de España on 28 August, with Atlético beating Barcelona 3–1 on the night, but losing 6–5 on aggregate.

During the 1997–98 Segunda División season, Madrid-based club Rayo Vallecano played some home matches at La Peineta, due to renovation works on its stadium, the Campo de Fútbol de Vallecas.

On 21–22 September 2002, La Peineta hosted the 9th IAAF World Cup, an international track and field sporting event sponsored by the International Association of Athletics Federations.

On 20 September 2017, shortly after the inauguration of the stadium, it was selected by UEFA to host the final match of the 2018–19 UEFA Champions League. This was the fifth European Cup/UEFA Champions League final held in Madrid, after the 1957, 1969, 1980, and 2010 finals, all held at the Santiago Bernabéu stadium of Atlético's cross-town rival Real Madrid.

On 27 March 2018, the stadium hosted the Spain national football team for the first time for a friendly against Argentina, which ended in a 6–1 win for Spain.

On 21 April 2018, it hosted the 2018 Copa del Rey Final between Sevilla and Barcelona. Barcelona won the game with a final score of 5–0. During the game Andrés Iniesta was substituted with a standing ovation by the fans since it was his last final with Barcelona.

On 17 March 2019, Metropolitano hosted the Spanish women's league match between Atlético Madrid and Barcelona, with 60,739 spectators attending the match, thus beating the worldwide record for a women's football match between clubs.

On 11 September 2025, UEFA selected the stadium for the second time to host the 2027 UEFA Champions League final.

On 1 June 2019, the stadium hosted the 2019 UEFA Champions League Final between Tottenham Hotspur and Liverpool, in which Liverpool defeated Spurs 2–0.

On 15 November 2026, England beat Spain 3–2 at the stadium, ending Spain's historic 44-match unbeaten run in competitive fixtures, which stretched back to their defeat to Scotland in March 2023.

UEFA Champions League finals
Season	Winners	Score	Runners-up	Attendance
2018–19	Liverpool (England)	2–0	(England) Tottenham	63,272
2026–27		–		

== Other events ==
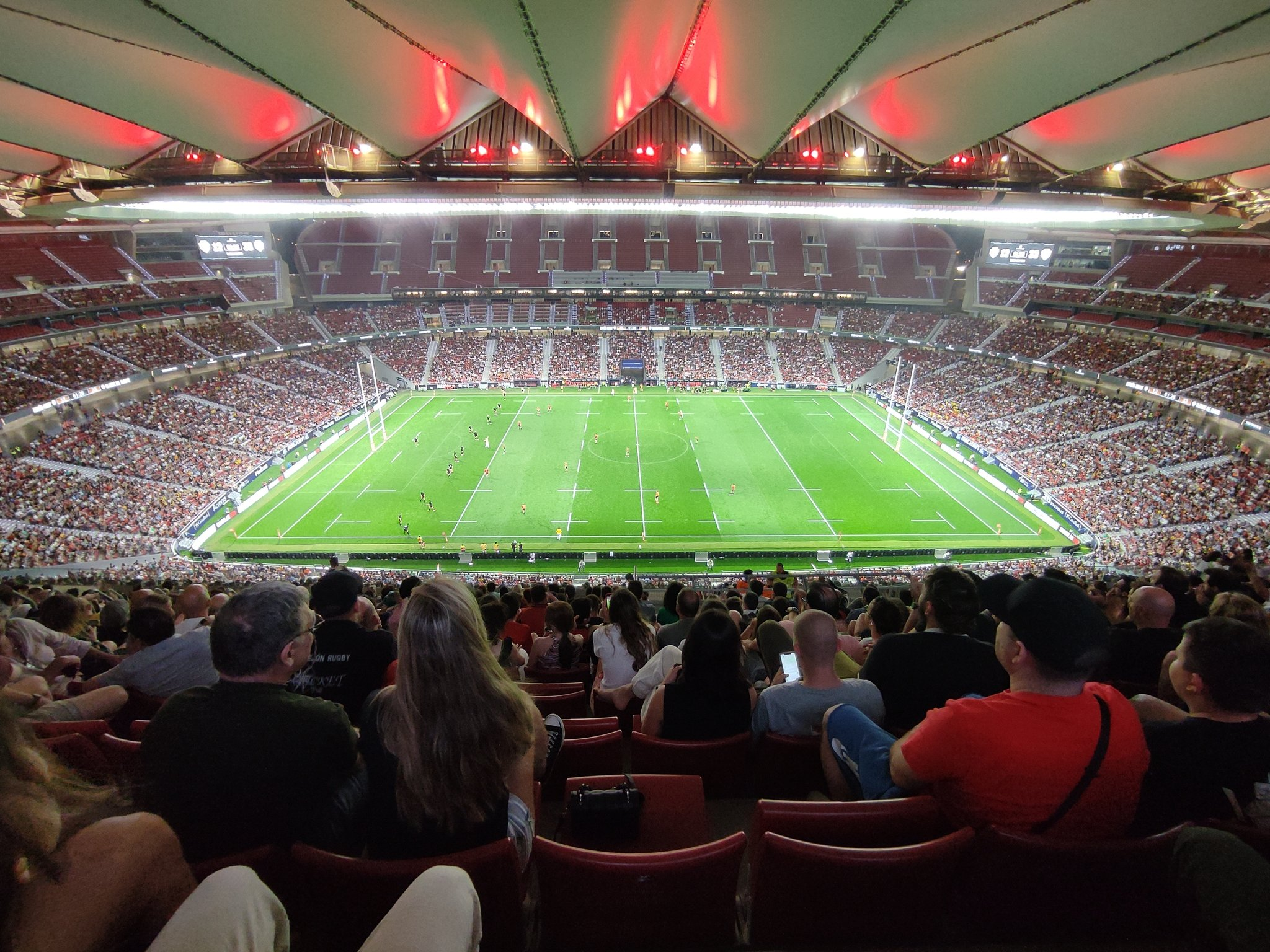
Spain playing Classic All Blacks at Metropolitano Stadium in 2022.

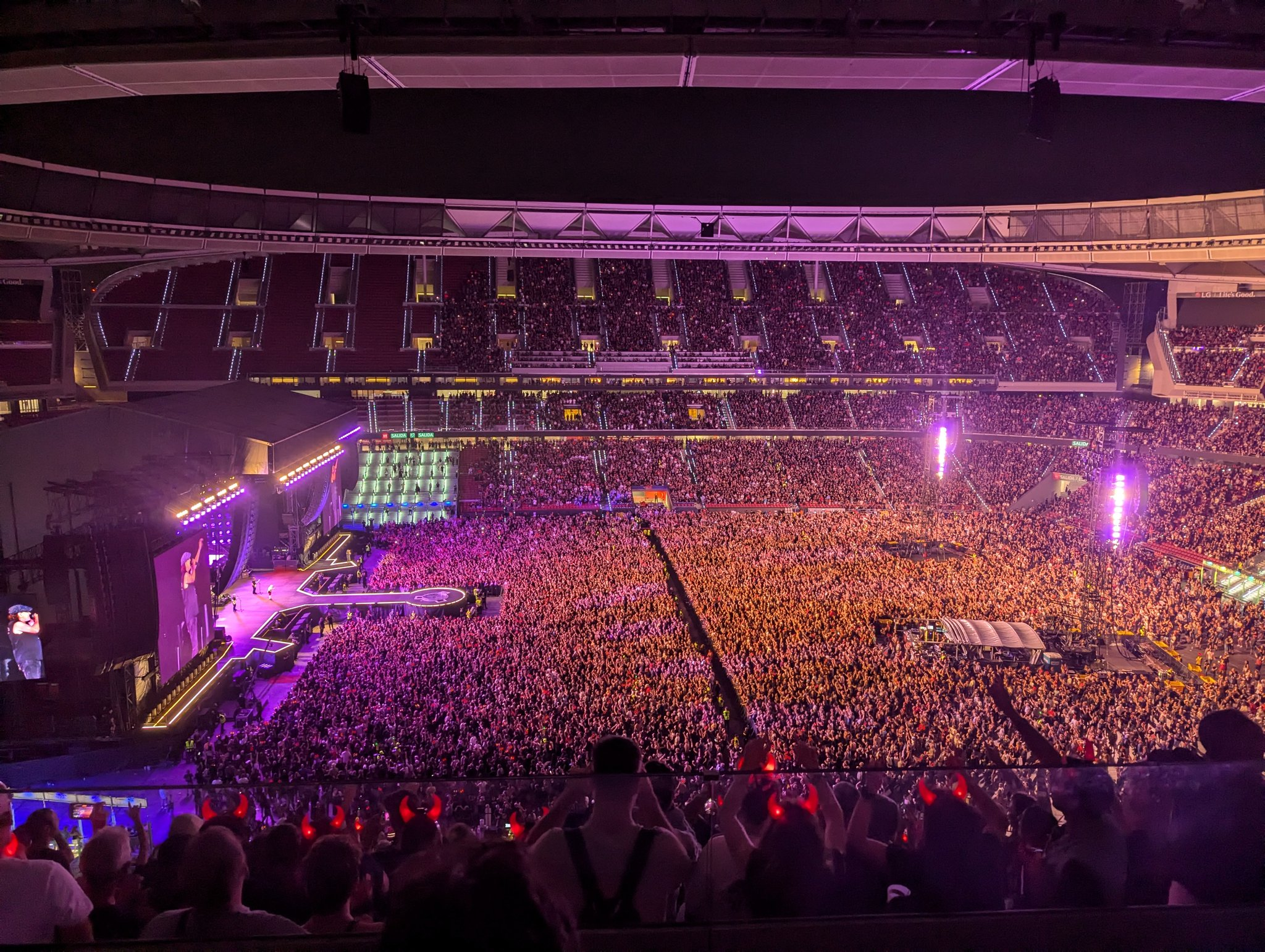
AC/DC in Estadio Metropolitano

The stadium hosted several rugby union matches with the first match of Spain against Classic All Blacks in 2022, with over 40,000 attending the match. In 2023, the stadium hosted Spain match against Argentina In July 2023, the stadium hosted the third edition of La Velada del Año, an annual celebrity boxing event. With over 70,000 tickets sold, it became the highest attendance for a boxing event in Spain since 1930.

In 2024, the stadium hosted the final of the World Rugby Sevens Series

=== Concerts ===
Concerts at Estadio Metropolitano
Date	Artist	Tour	Attendance
22 June 2018	Bruno Mars	24K Magic World Tour	—
14 July 2018	Iron Maiden	Legacy of the Beast Tour	—
11 June 2019	Ed Sheeran	Divide Tour	51,944
15 June 2019	Alejandro Sanz	La Gira	—
29 June 2019	Manuel Carrasco	La Cruz del Mapa	—
7 July 2019	Bon Jovi	This House is Not For Sale	54,040
26 July 2019	Muse	Simulation Theory Tour	50,719
1 June 2022	The Rolling Stones	Sixty	52,752
4 June 2022	Alejandro Sanz	Sanz en Vivo	—
24 June 2022	Vetusta Morla	Cable a Tierra	35,822
3 June 2023	Rockin'1000		—
7 June 2023	Pet Shop Boys	Dreamworld	—
9 June 2023	Guns N' Roses	World Tour 2023	—
23 June 2023	Rammstein	Rammstein Stadium Tour	49,210
18 July 2023	The Weeknd	After Hours til Dawn Tour	54,568
12, 14 & 17 June 2024	Bruce Springsteen	Springsteen & E Street Band 2024 World Tour	161,379
21 June 2024	Morat	Los Estadios	55,000
22 June 2024	Estopa	25 Aniversario	—
12 & 14 July 2024	Metallica	M72 World Tour	123,697
30 & 31 May 2025	Ed Sheeran	Mathematics Tour	140,000
14 June 2025	Lola Indigo	La Bruja, la Niña y el Dragón	65,000
20 & 21 June 2025	Dellafuente	Los Estadios	130,000
28 June 2025	Imagine Dragons	Loom World Tour	55,000
5 July 2025	Iron Maiden	Run for Your Lives World Tour	55,000
12 & 16 July 2025	AC/DC	Power Up Tour	—
22 July 2025	Stray Kids	Dominate World Tour	55,000
30 & 31 July 2025	Aitana	Metamorfosis Season	110,000
30 & 31 May 2, 3, 6, 7, 10, 11, 14 & 15 June 2026	Bad Bunny	Debí Tirar Más Fotos World Tour	622,613
20 June 2026	Alejandro Sanz	¿Y Ahora, Qué? Tour	55,000
26 & 27 June 2026	BTS	Arirang World Tour	135,000
10 & 11 July 2026	Bruno Mars	The Romantic Tour	—
30 July 2026	Kanye West	Ye Live Concert Tour	65,000
28, 29 & 30 August 2026	The Weeknd	After Hours til Dawn Tour	—
30 & 31 July; 2 August	Harry Styles	Together, Together	
24, 25, 26, 27 June 2027	Karol G	Viajando Por El Mundo Tropitour	—

== Transport and access ==
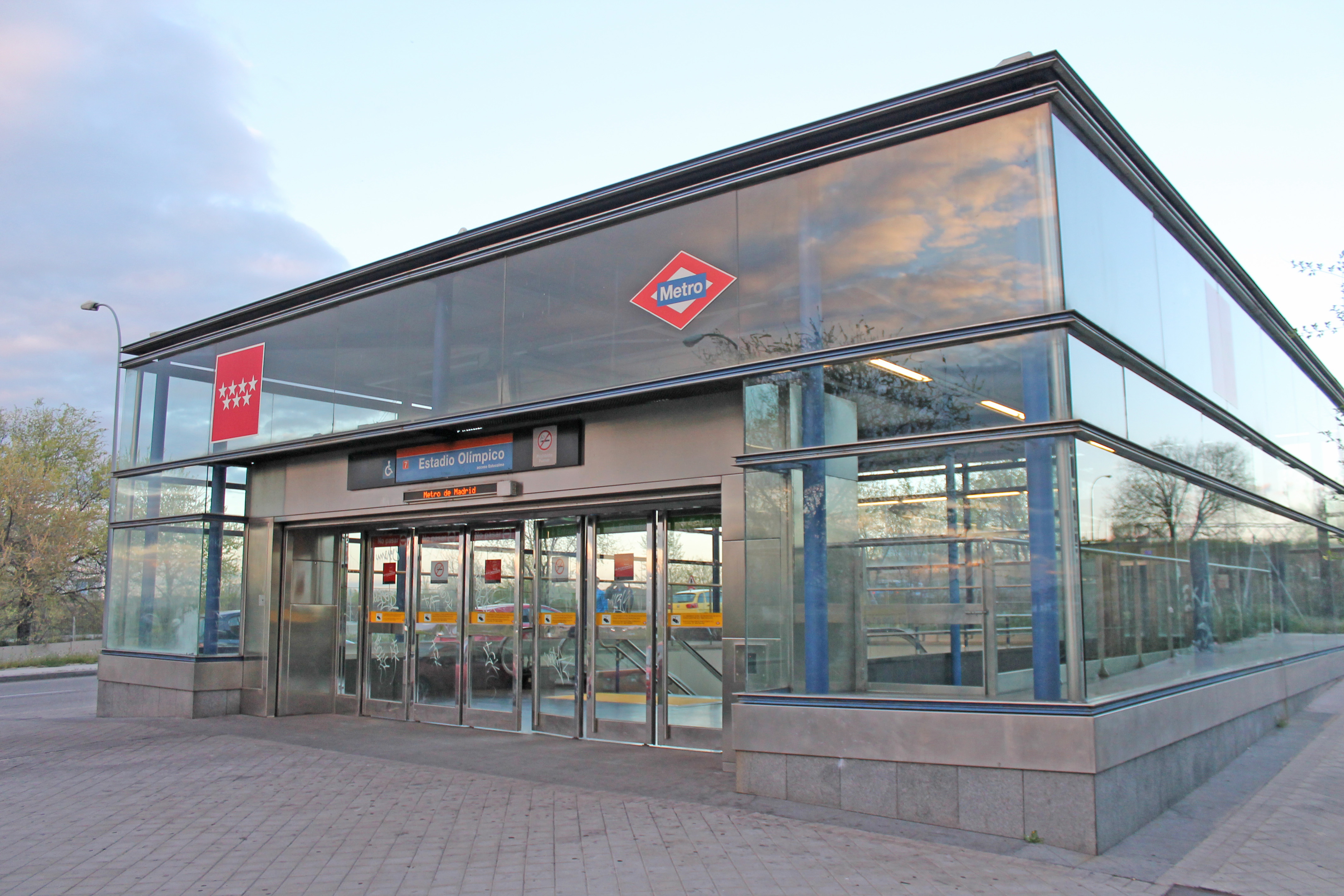
Estadio Metropolitano Metro station

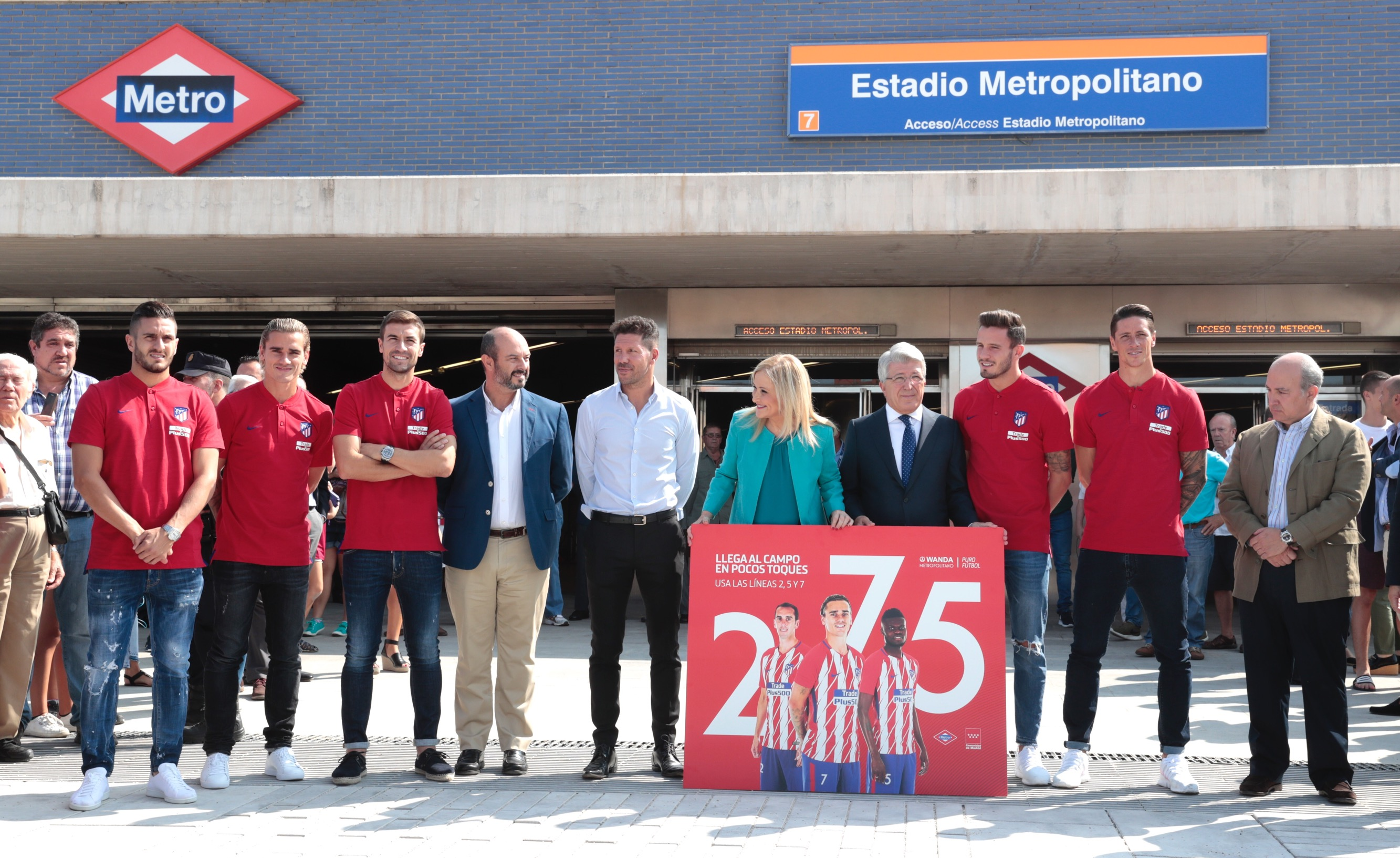
Inauguration of the new access to Estadio Metropolitano Metro station 2017

The Madrid City Council, the Spanish Ministry of Public Works and Transport and Atletico Madrid signed an agreement to improve access to the stadium. The first phase of the work was planned to be completed before the stadium opened, and included the new entrance from the M-40 towards Avenida Luis Aragonés, the braiding link between the Eisenhower interchange (M-14 and M-21) and the stadium service road, the improvement of the entrance by Arcentales Avenue, the construction of a second vestibule, and finally access to the Estadio Metropolitano Metro station. These infrastructures will be paid by the club for a fee close to 30 million euros.

The second phase was planned to take place after the inauguration. According to the announcement by the Ministry of Public Works and Transport, it consists of the opening of the O'Donnell Cercanías Madrid station, which will convert the existing stop into a new station for the Rejas neighborhood. The station will be located at the intersection of the M-21 dual carriageway and M-40 highway, close to Ciudad Pegaso and the Plenilunio Shopping Center and near the Wanda Metropolitano.

The City Council is in talks with the Ministry of Public Works and Transport and the Community of Madrid about further improving access to the new stadium and adapting to the substantial increase of traffic to the neighborhood once it is operational. The measures proposed by the municipality of Madrid include a request to extend line 2 of Metro to the future O'Donnell Cercanías Madrid station, as well as the connection of said line to line 7's Estadio Metropolitano Metro station, which has the largest platform in the network.

There are three more Metro stations within a two to 20 minute walk of the stadium: Las Rosas (line 2), Canillejas (line 5), and Las Musas (line 7). The buses of EMT Madrid with a stop close to the stadium are lines 28, 38, 48, 140, 153, E2, N5 and N6 (the last two lines are nocturnal buses). The long-distance buses are lines 286, 288 and 289. The EMT operates a special service on match days; one line runs from the Canillejas exchanger to the stadium (SE721 line). Canillejas has connections to Metro line 5 and EMT bus lines 77, 101, 140, 151 and 200.

== Construction gallery ==
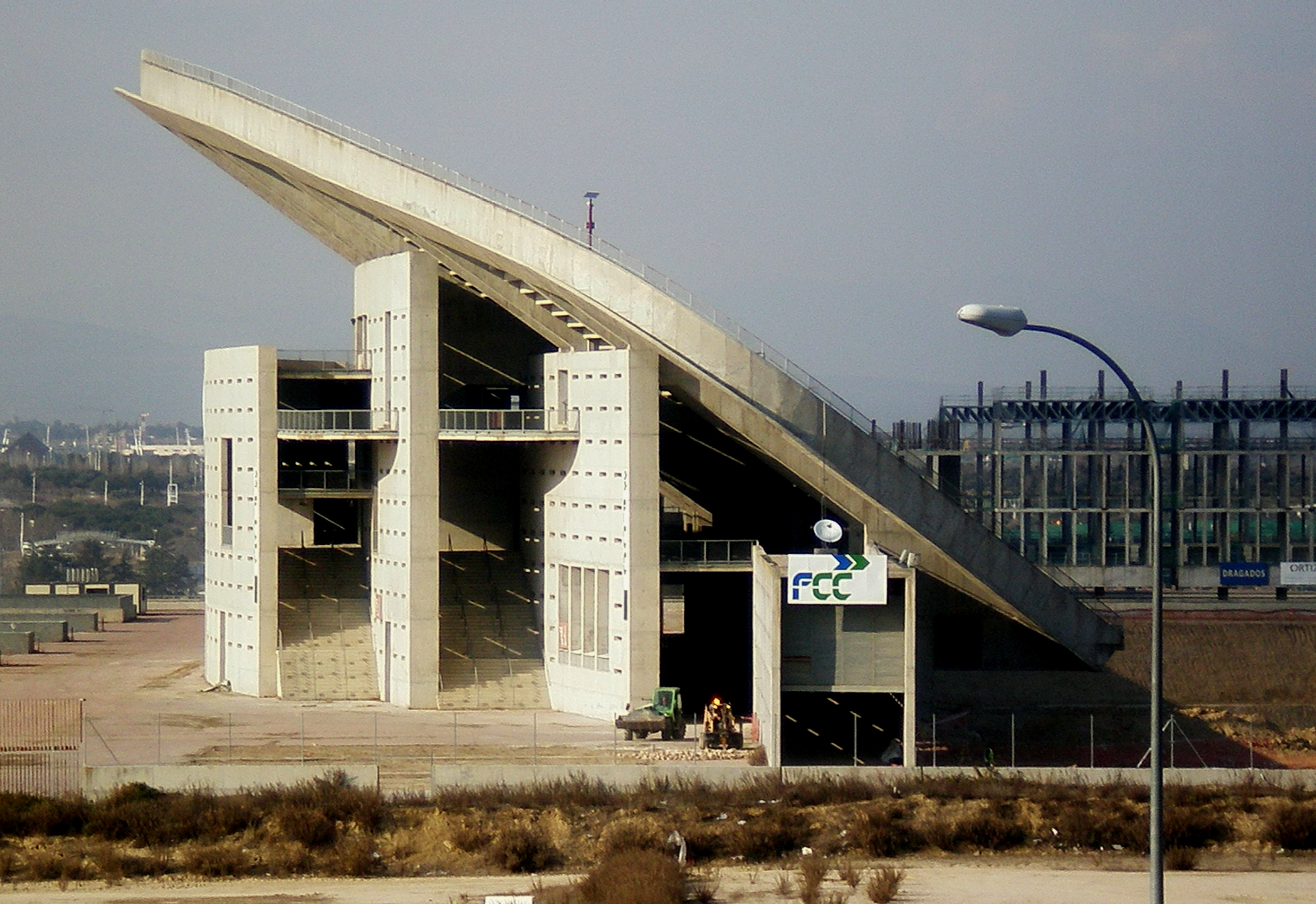
External view of La Peineta before reconstruction in March 2012

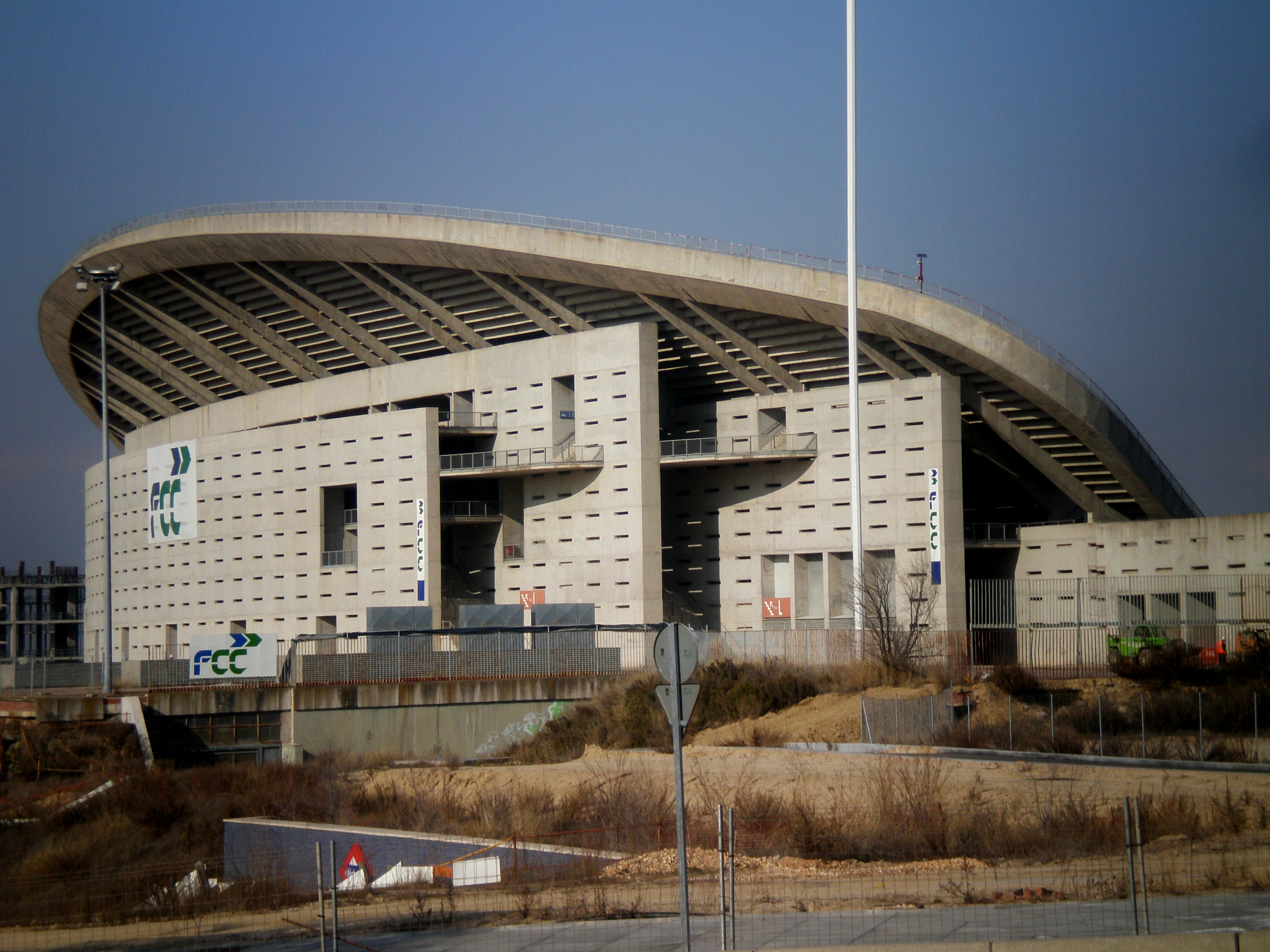
The comb-shaped stand, origin of the nickname of La Peineta, in March 2012

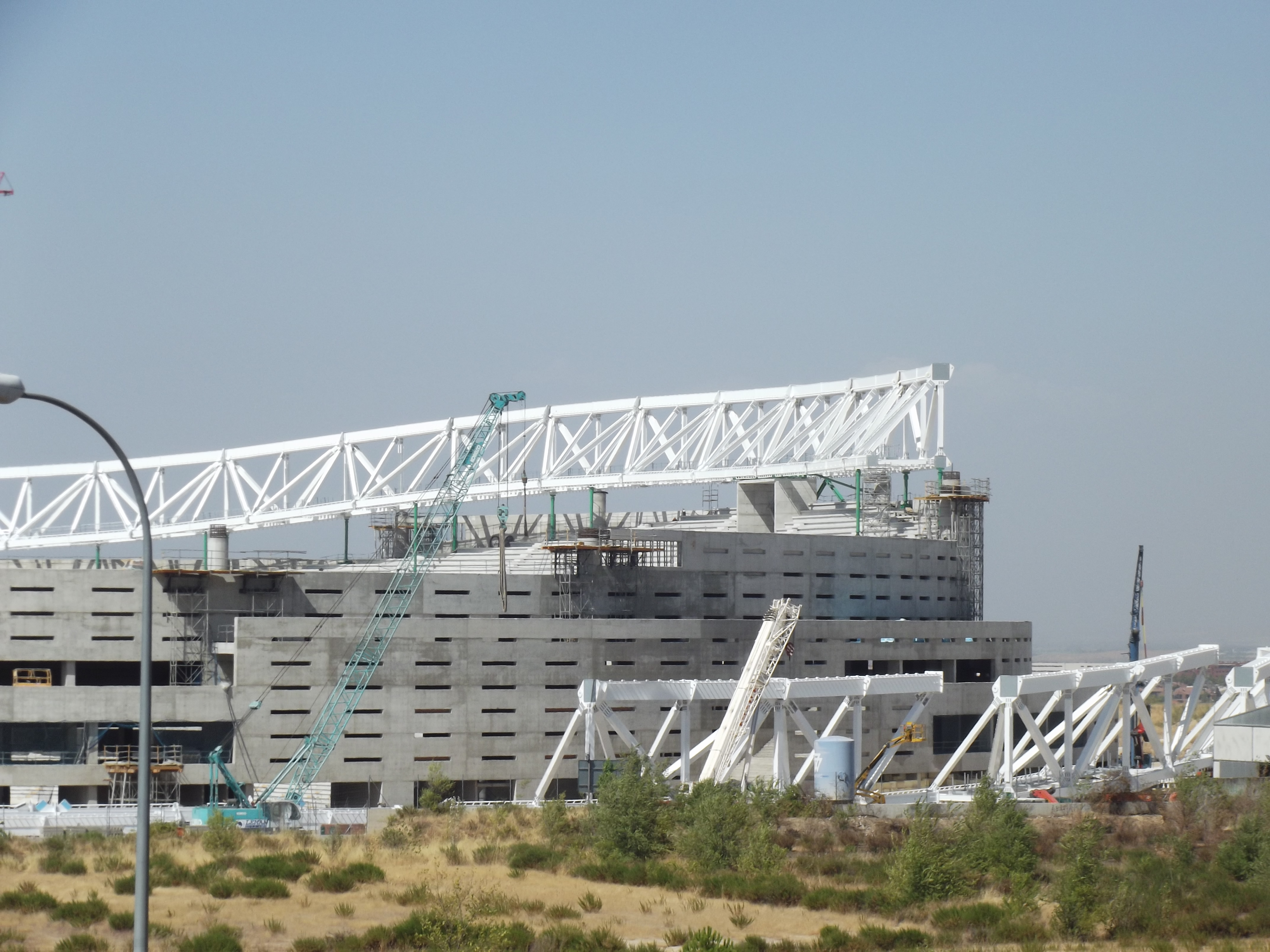
Pressure ring of the roof in August 2016

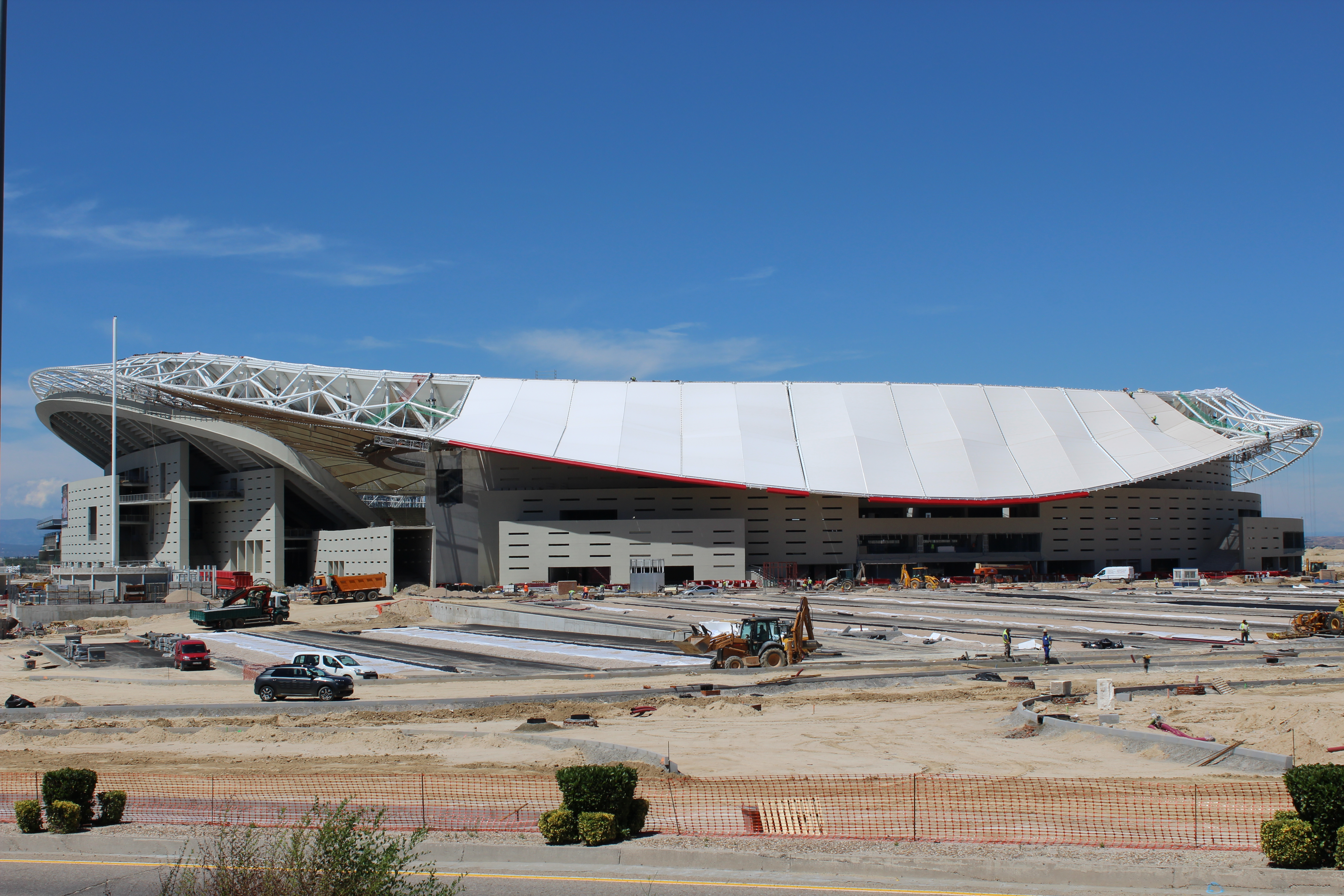
View of the stadium during reconstruction in June 2017

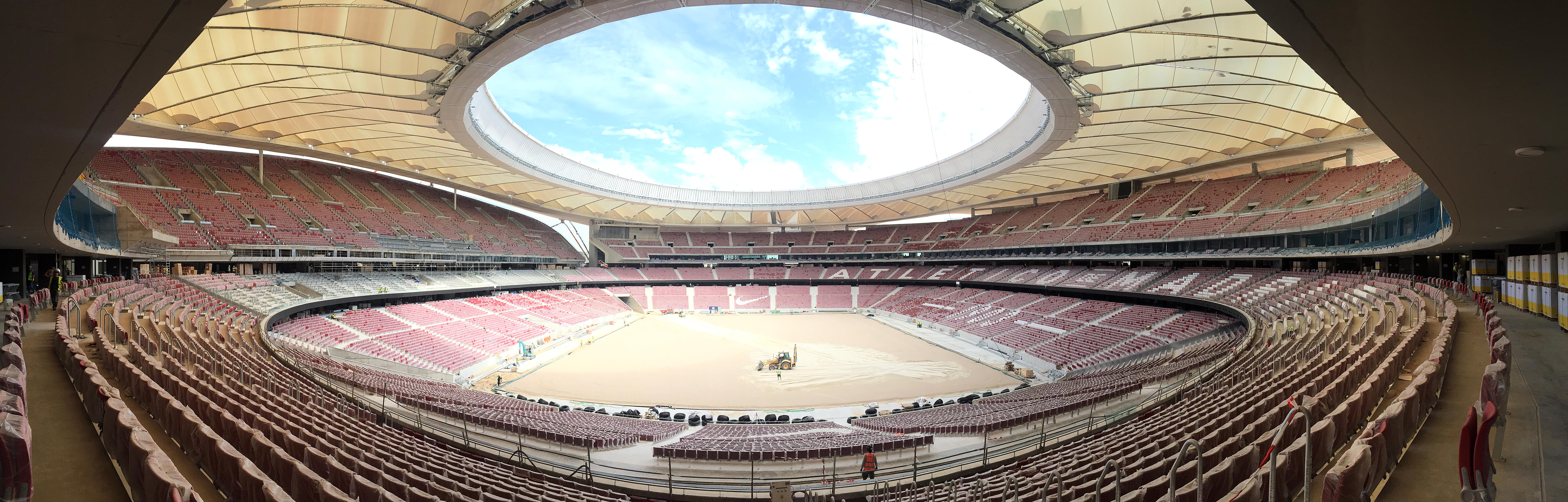
Inner view of the stadium in August 2017

== See also ==
- Lists of stadiums
- Football in Spain

Preceded by NSC Olimpiyskiy Stadium; Kyiv	UEFA Champions League; Final venue 2019	Succeeded by Estádio da Luz; Lisbon
