= Parque de las Avenidas (Madrid Metro) =

Madrid Metro station

- Platforms of the station

General information
- Location: Salamanca, Madrid; Spain
- Coordinates: 40.4394477°N 3.662967°W
- System: Madrid Metro station
- Owner: CRTM
- Operator: CRTM

Construction
- Accessible: No

Other information
- Fare zone: A

History
- Opened: 17 March 1975; 51 years ago

Services
Preceding station	Madrid Metro	Following station
Barrio de la Concepción towards Hospital del Henares	Line 7	Cartagena towards Pitis
Location
- Location within Madrid

Parque de las Avenidas [ˈpaɾke ðe las aβeˈniðas] is a station on Line 7 of the Madrid Metro, located under the Parque de las Avenidas ("Park of the Avenues"). It is located in fare Zone A.
