= Lacoma (Madrid Metro) =

Madrid Metro station

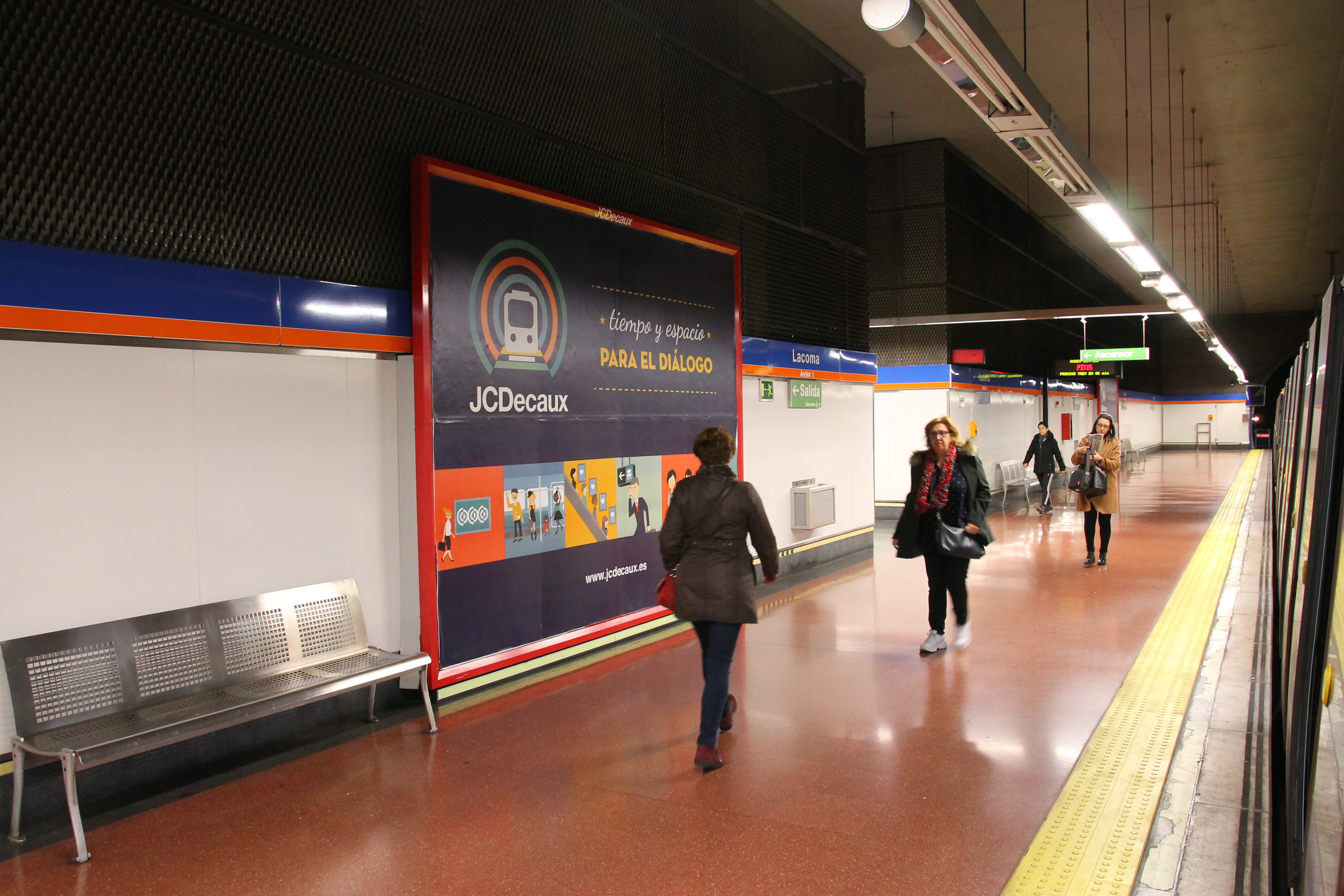
- Platform of the station

General information
- Location: Fuencarral-El Pardo, Madrid; Spain
- Coordinates: 40.4850161°N 3.723046°W
- System: Madrid Metro station
- Owner: CRTM
- Operator: CRTM

Construction
- Accessible: yes

Other information
- Fare zone: A

History
- Opened: 29 March 1999; 27 years ago

Services
Preceding station	Madrid Metro	Following station
Avenida de la Ilustración towards Hospital del Henares	Line 7	Arroyofresno towards Pitis
Location
- Location within Madrid

Lacoma [la.ˈko.ma] is a station on Line 7 of the Madrid Metro, on the Calle de la Lacoma. It is located in fare Zone A.
