= Francos Rodríguez (Madrid Metro) =

Madrid Metro station

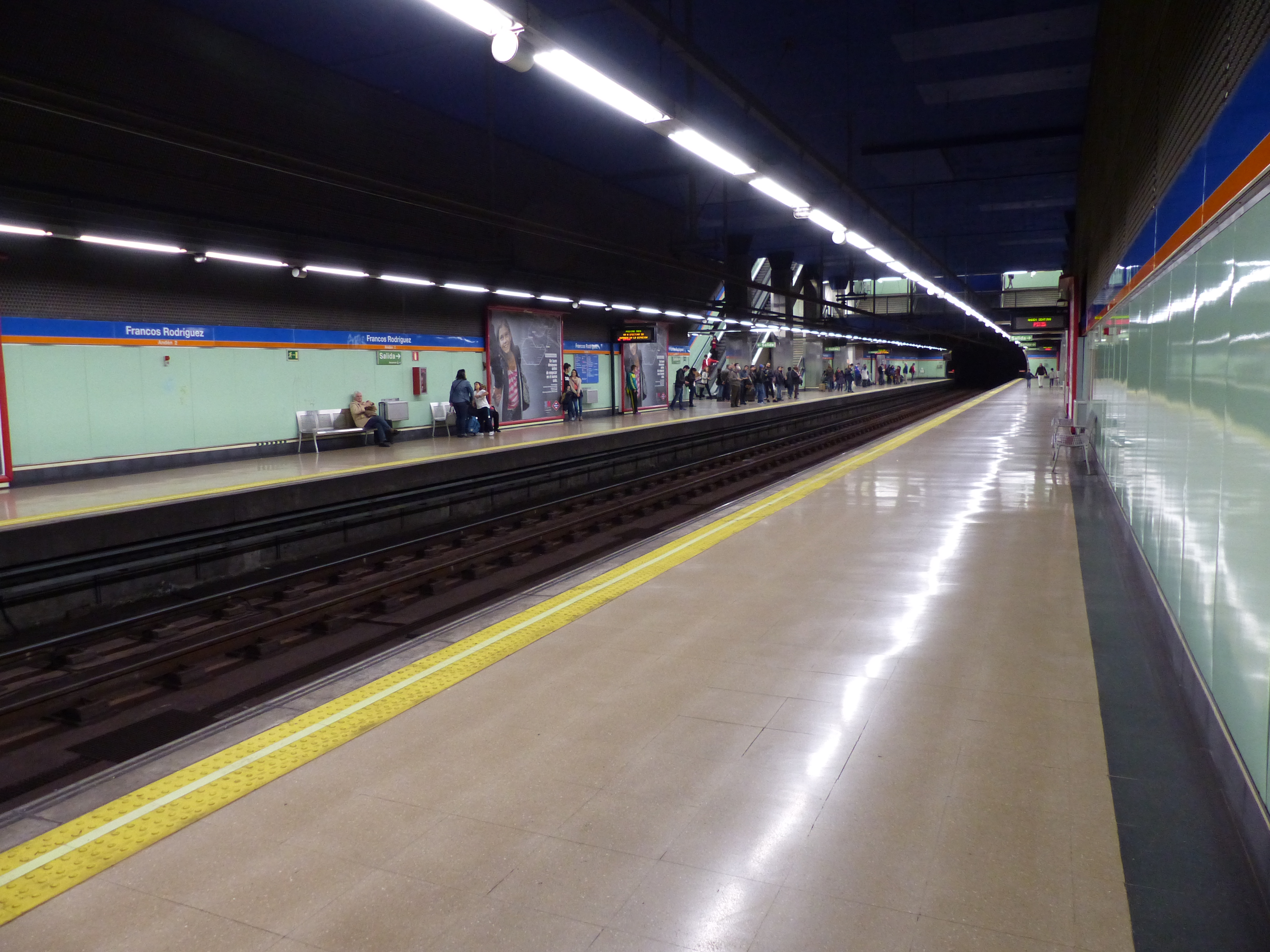

General information
- Location: Moncloa-Aravaca, Madrid; Spain
- Coordinates: 40.4564786°N 3.7123853°W
- System: Madrid Metro station
- Owner: CRTM
- Operator: CRTM

Construction
- Accessible: yes

Other information
- Fare zone: A

History
- Opened: 12 February 1999; 27 years ago

Services
Preceding station	Madrid Metro	Following station
Guzmán el Bueno towards Hospital del Henares	Line 7	Valdezarza towards Pitis
Location
- Location within Madrid

Francos Rodríguez [ˈfɾaŋkos roˈðɾiɣeθ] is a station on Line 7 of the Madrid Metro, on the Calle Francos Rodríguez, named for former Mayor of Madrid José Francos Rodríguez (1862–1931). It is located in fare Zone A.
