= Cartagena (Madrid Metro) =

Madrid Metro station

- Platform of the station

General information
- Location: Chamartín / Salamanca, Madrid; Spain
- Coordinates: 40.4393407°N 3.6721511°W
- System: Madrid Metro station
- Owner: CRTM
- Operator: CRTM

Construction
- Accessible: No

Other information
- Fare zone: A

History
- Opened: 17 March 1975; 51 years ago

Services
Preceding station	Madrid Metro	Following station
Parque de las Avenidas towards Hospital del Henares	Line 7	Avenida de América towards Pitis
Location
- Location within Madrid

Cartagena [kaɾtaˈxena] is a station on Line 7 of the Madrid Metro, located near the Calle de Cartagena. It is located in fare Zone A.
