= Las Musas (Madrid Metro) =

Madrid Metro station

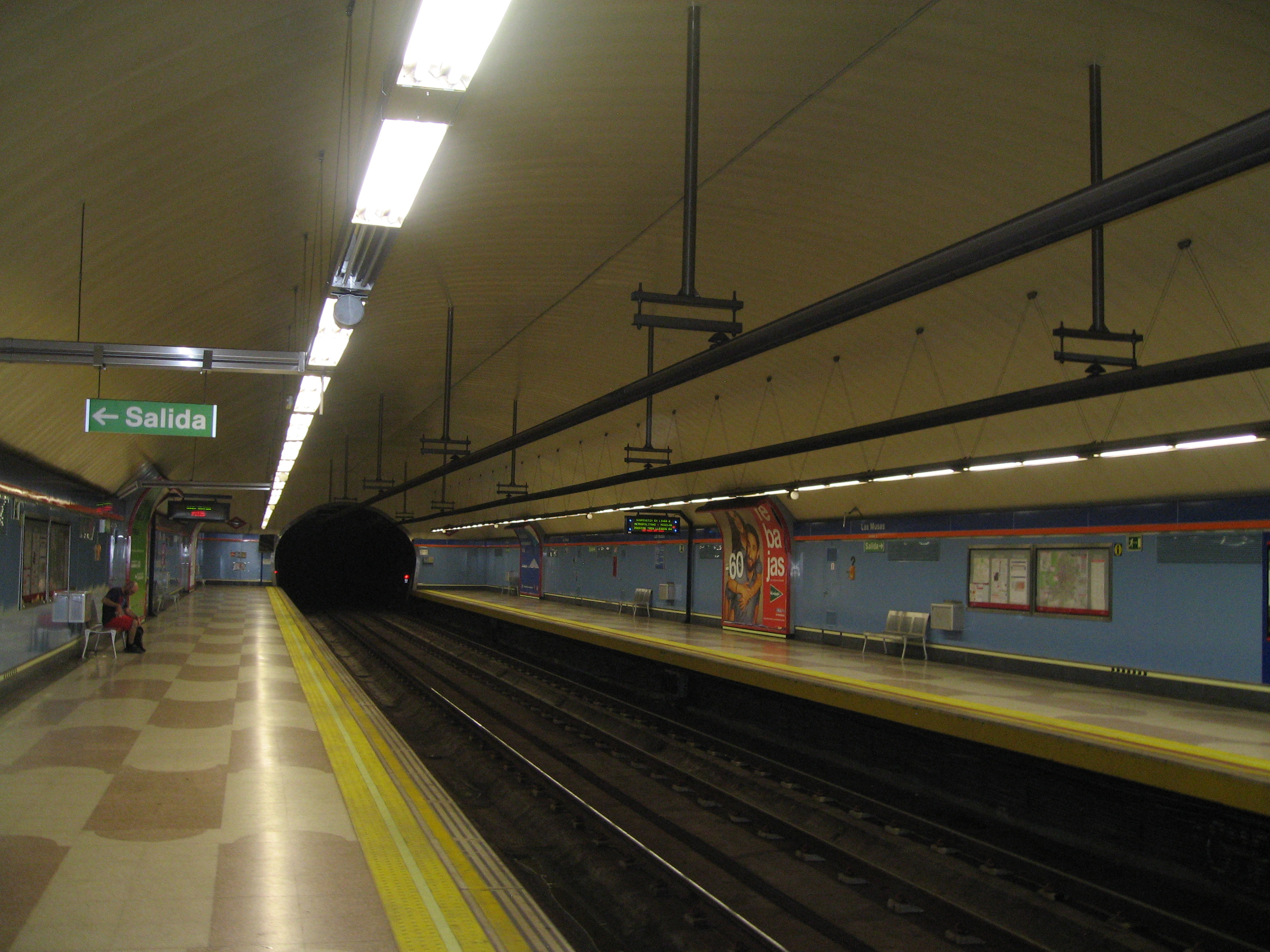

General information
- Location: San Blas, Madrid; Spain
- Coordinates: 40.432984°N 3.6078807°W
- System: Madrid Metro station
- Owner: CRTM
- Operator: CRTM

Construction
- Accessible: No

Other information
- Fare zone: A

History
- Opened: 17 July 1974; 52 years ago

Services
Preceding station	Madrid Metro	Following station
Estadio Metropolitano towards Hospital del Henares	Line 7	San Blas towards Pitis
Location
- Location within Madrid

Las Musas [las ˈmu.sas] is a station on Line 7 of the Madrid Metro, named for the nearby Calle Musas ("Street of the Muses"). It is located in fare Zone A.
