= Henares (Madrid Metro) =

Madrid Metro station

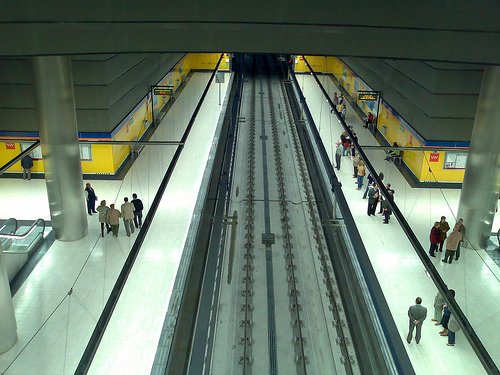

General information
- Location: San Fernando de Henares, Madrid; Spain
- Coordinates: 40.4177664°N 3.5271783°W
- System: Madrid Metro station
- Owner: CRTM
- Operator: CRTM

Construction
- Accessible: yes

Other information
- Fare zone: B1

History
- Opened: 5 May 2007; 19 years ago

Services
Preceding station	Madrid Metro	Following station
Hospital del Henares Terminus	Line 7	Jarama towards Pitis
Location
- Location within Community of Madrid

Henares [eˈna.ɾes] is a station on Line 7 of the Madrid Metro, serving the western part of the San Fernando de Henares municipality. It is located in fare zone B1.
