= Line 7 (Madrid Metro) =

Rapid transit line of the Madrid Metro

Coordinates: 40.4381°N 3.6914°W

- A Class 9000 train at García Noblejas station

Overview
- Native name: Línea 7
- Owner: CRTM
- Locale: Madrid
- Termini: Hospital del Henares; Pitis
- Stations: 31
- Website: www.metromadrid.es/en/linea/linea-7

Service
- Type: Rapid transit
- System: Madrid Metro
- Operator: CRTM
- Rolling stock: AnsaldoBreda 9000

History
- Opened: 17 July 1974; 52 years ago
- Last extension: 2008

Technical
- Line length: 32.919 km (20.455 mi)
- Character: Underground
- Track gauge: 1,445 mm (4 ft 8 7/8 in)

Line 7 of the Madrid Metro is a rapid transit line that originally opened on 17 July 1974. It runs between Pitis and Hospital del Henares.

== History ==
The line has been extended multiple times. It initially ran between Pueblo Nuevo and Las Musas. On 17 May 1975, the line was extended from Pueblo Nuevo to Avenida de América, and was not extended for many years. This was a problem as line 7 was very underused. The problem was solved in 1998 and 1999 when an extension to Pitis was opened in four stages. The first stage was between Avenida de América and Gregorio Marañón, opening on 1 April 1998, followed by Gregorio Marañón to Canal. The next section to open extended the line to Valdezarza, and a final section further reached Pitis. Pitis, however, was the only station on the Madrid metro to have restricted opening times. At the time, Pitis was a very small village, and the station's main purpose is to provide interchange for Renfe services. Between 1999 and 2018, most trains ran between Estadio Olímpico and Lacoma, with Pitis being served by only a few trains each hour.

Beginning in 2019, all trains are expected to terminate at Pitis following the opening of Arroyofresno station, which was previously constructed, but not opened due to the ongoing construction of the surrounding developments. Arroyofresno station was finally opened on 23 March 2019.

On 4 May 2007, Line 7 was extended from Las Musas to the towns of Coslada and San Fernando. At Estadio Metropolitano, next to Atlético Madrid's Metropolitano Stadium, passengers have to change trains for MetroEste to Coslada and San Fernando - the so-called Line 7B.

The section of Line 7 between Estadio Metroplitano and Hospital del Henares, known as MetroEste or Line 7B, has been closed fully or partially several times since its opening in May 2007. San Fernando de Henares, which is close to the Jarama River, sits on a large salt deposit and is geologically composed of poorly suited soils. The drilling of the tunnel used for the extension has aggravated the high amount of groundwater-related subsidence in the area, making the area no longer suitable for new development; the tunnel has experienced repeated flooding and structural corrosion due to the subsidence. By the end of May 2023, the subsidence in San Fernando de Henares had destroyed numerous structures, forcing the relocation of a significant portion of the area's residents. On 24 August 2022, the section of Line 7B east of San Fernando station was closed for what would become a three-year period owing to reconstruction of the line's tunnels and remediation works; the closure would be extended to Barrio del Puerto station in July 2024. The entirety of Line 7B would fully reopen on 22 November 2025.

== Rolling stock ==
Line 7A, the primary portion of the line from Pitis to Estadio Metropolitano, uses 6-car trains of class 9000. Line 7B, the extension to Hospital del Henares, uses 3-car trains of class 9000.

== Stations ==
Municipality	District	Station	Opened	Zone	Connections	Notes
Coslada		Hospital del Henares	2008	B1		
Madrid	San Fernando de Henares	Henares	2007	B1		
Madrid	San Fernando de Henares	Jarama	2007	B1		
Madrid	San Fernando de Henares	San Fernando	2007	B1		
Coslada		La Rambla	2007	B1		
Coslada		Coslada Central	2007	B1	Cercanías Madrid:	
Coslada		Barrio del Puerto	2007	B1		
Madrid	San Blas-Canillejas	Estadio Metropolitano	2007	A		
Madrid	San Blas-Canillejas	Las Musas	1974	A		
Madrid	San Blas-Canillejas	San Blas	1974	A		
Madrid	San Blas-Canillejas	Simancas	1974	A		
Madrid	Ciudad Lineal	García Noblejas	1974	A		
Madrid	Ciudad Lineal	Ascao	1974	A		
Madrid	Ciudad Lineal	Pueblo Nuevo	1964	A	Madrid Metro:	
Madrid	Ciudad Lineal	Barrio de la Concepción	1975	A		
Madrid	Salamanca	Parque de las Avenidas	1975	A		
Madrid	Salamanca / Chamartín	Cartagena	1975	A		
Madrid	Salamanca / Chamartín	Avenida de América	1973	A	Madrid Metro:	
Madrid	Chamartín / Chamberí	Gregorio Marañón	1998	A	Madrid Metro:	
Madrid	Chamberí	Alonso Cano	1998	A	Madrid Metro: (Ríos Rosas) (Note: Both stations are displayed on station maps as being distant from one another, and they are not announced as transfer points for one another.)	
Madrid	Chamberí	Canal	1998	A	Madrid Metro:	
Madrid	Chamberí	Islas Filipinas	1999	A		
Madrid	Chamberí / Moncloa-Aravaca	Guzmán el Bueno	1987	A	Madrid Metro:	
Madrid	Moncloa-Aravaca	Francos Rodríguez	1999	A		
Madrid	Moncloa-Aravaca	Valdezarza	1999	A		
Madrid	Moncloa-Aravaca / Fuencarral-El Pardo	Antonio Machado	1999	A		
Madrid	Fuencarral-El Pardo	Peñagrande	1999	A		
Madrid	Fuencarral-El Pardo	Avenida de la Ilustración	1999	A		
Madrid	Fuencarral-El Pardo	Lacoma	1999	A		
Madrid	Fuencarral-El Pardo	Arroyofresno	2001	A		
Madrid	Fuencarral-El Pardo	Pitis	1999	A	Cercanías Madrid:	

== See also ==
- Madrid
- Transport in Madrid
- List of Madrid Metro stations
- List of metro systems
