= Classic All Blacks =

Rugby union team in New Zealand

- Coach: Andy Haden
- Captain: Justin Marshall
Team kit

The Classic All Blacks is a rugby union team made up of former New Zealand men's rugby union representatives. It is not an official national team of New Zealand. First put together in 2007, the team has played Japan three times, English Premiership side Leicester Tigers and 'classic' teams from France and Australia.

In 2013, the side played Fiji as part of the Fiji Rugby Union's centennial anniversary.

On 7 October 2015, the Classic All Blacks played RC Toulonnais at the Stade Mayol in a match to honour the late Jerry Collins.

== Results ==
=== Matches against international sides ===
Opponent	Score	Result	Date	Venue	City
Japan	35–26	Won	9 May 2007	Kobe Universiade Memorial	Kobe
Japan	36–6	Won	12 May 2007	Chichibunomiya Rugby Stadium	Tokyo
Japan	15–13	Won	31 May 2008	National Stadium	Tokyo
Fiji	14–33	Lost	12 June 2013	ANZ Stadium	Suva

=== Overall ===
Opponent	Played	Won	Lost	Drawn	% Won
(Australia) Classic Wallabies	2	2	0	0	100%
Fiji	1	0	1	0	0%
(France) French Classics	1	1	0	0	100%
Japan	3	3	0	0	100%
(England) Leicester Tigers	1	1	0	0	100%
(France) RC Toulonnais	1	0	1	0	0%
Total	9	7	2	0	77.78%

== Squad for 2015 Jerry Collins honorary match ==
The provisional squad to play Toulon on 7 October 2015.

- Head Coach – (New Zealand) Andy Haden

Note: Flags indicate national union under World Rugby eligibility rules.

Player	Position	Date of birth (age)	Club/province	Union
Corey Flynn	Hooker	5 January 1981 (age 45)	(France) Toulouse	New Zealand
Andrew Hore	Hooker	13 September 1978 (age 48)	Unattached (Retired)	New Zealand
John Afoa	Prop	16 October 1983 (age 42)	(England) Gloucester	New Zealand
Carl Hayman	Prop	14 November 1979 (age 46)	Unattached (Retired)	New Zealand
Saimone Taumoepeau	Prop	21 December 1979 (age 46)	(France) Castres Olympique	New Zealand
Neemia Tialata	Prop	15 July 1982 (age 44)	(France) Toulouse	New Zealand
Tom Donnelly	Lock	1 October 1981 (age 44)	(France) Montpellier	New Zealand
Brad Thorn	Lock	3 February 1975 (age 51)	Unattached (Retired)	New Zealand
Ali Williams	Lock	30 April 1981 (age 45)	Unattached (Retired)	New Zealand
Daniel Braid	Flanker	13 February 1981 (age 45)	(England) Sale Sharks	New Zealand
Jason Eaton	Flanker	21 August 1982 (age 44)	(France) La Rochelle	New Zealand
Adam Thomson	Flanker	13 March 1982 (age 44)	(Australia) Queensland Reds	New Zealand
Chris Masoe	Number 8	15 May 1979 (age 47)	(France) Racing	New Zealand
Mike Delany	Fly-half	15 June 1982 (age 44)	(England) Newcastle Falcons	New Zealand
Nick Evans	Fly-half	14 August 1980 (age 46)	(England) Harlequins	New Zealand
Richard Kahui	Centre	9 June 1985 (age 41)	(Japan) Toshiba Brave Lupus	New Zealand
Luke McAlister	Centre	28 August 1983 (age 43)	(France) Toulouse	New Zealand
Sam Tuitupou	Centre	1 February 1982 (age 44)	(England) Sale Sharks	New Zealand
Joe Rokocoko	Wing	6 June 1983 (age 43)	(France) Bayonne	New Zealand
Sitiveni Sivivatu	Wing	19 April 1982 (age 44)	(France) Castres Olympique	New Zealand
Anthony Tuitavake	Wing	12 February 1982 (age 44)	(France) Montpellier	New Zealand
Rudi Wulf	Wing	2 February 1984 (age 42)	(France) Toulon	New Zealand
Mils Muliaina	Fullback	31 July 1980 (age 46)	(Italy) Zebre	New Zealand
