= Valdezarza =

Coordinates: 40°27′54″N 3°43′6″W

- City neighborhood
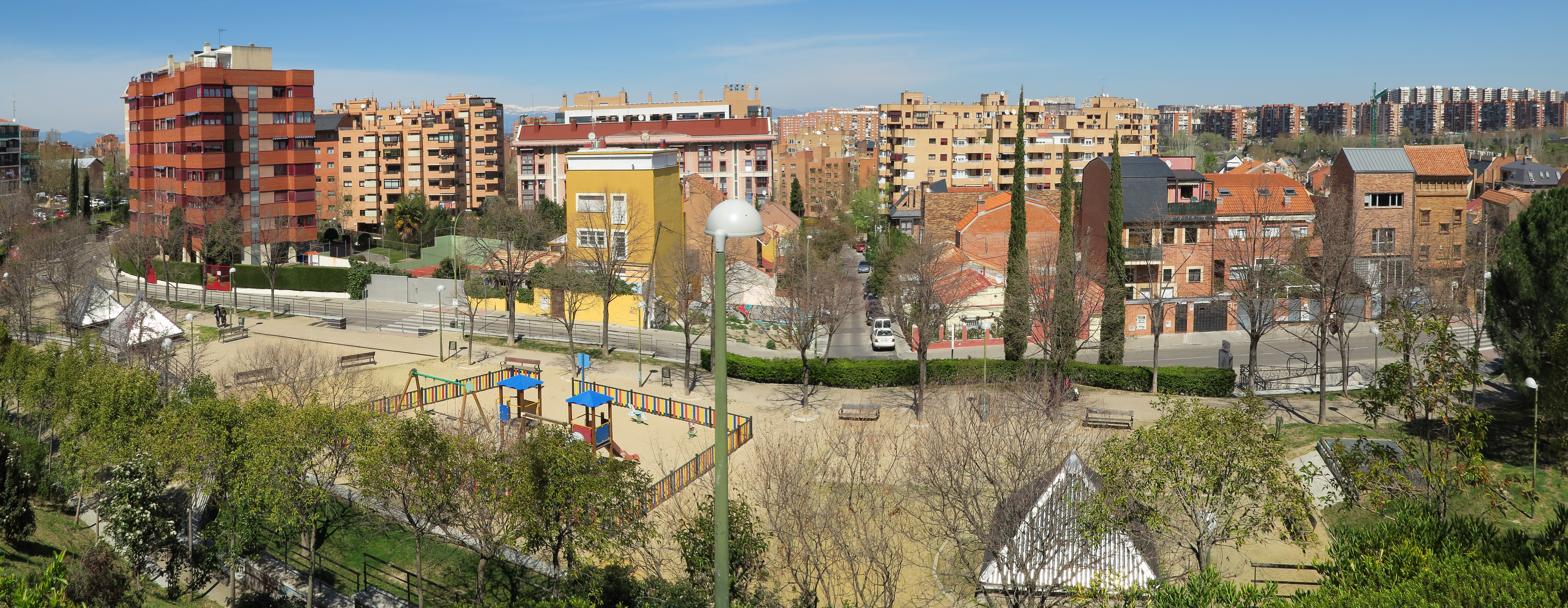

- Country: Spain
- Region: Community of Madrid
- Municipality: Madrid
- District: Moncloa-Aravaca

Valdezarza ([baldeˈθaɾθa], "Bramble Valley") is an administrative neighborhood (barrio) of Madrid belonging to the district of Moncloa-Aravaca.
