= Hospital del Henares (Madrid Metro) =

Madrid Metro station

General information
- Location: 2nd district of Coslada, Madrid; Spain
- Coordinates: 40.4176066°N 3.5345323°W
- System: Madrid Metro station
- Owner: CRTM
- Operator: CRTM

Construction
- Accessible: yes

Other information
- Fare zone: B1

History
- Opened: 8 February 2008; 18 years ago

Services
Preceding station	Madrid Metro	Following station
Terminus	Line 7	Henares towards Pitis
Location
- Location within Madrid

Hospital del Henares [ospiˈtal del eˈnaɾes] is a station on Line 7 of the Madrid Metro and the eastern terminus of that line. The station's name refers to the nearby Hospital Universitario del Henares which also opened in February 2008. It is located in fare Zone B1.
