= Pitis (Madrid Metro) =

Madrid Metro station

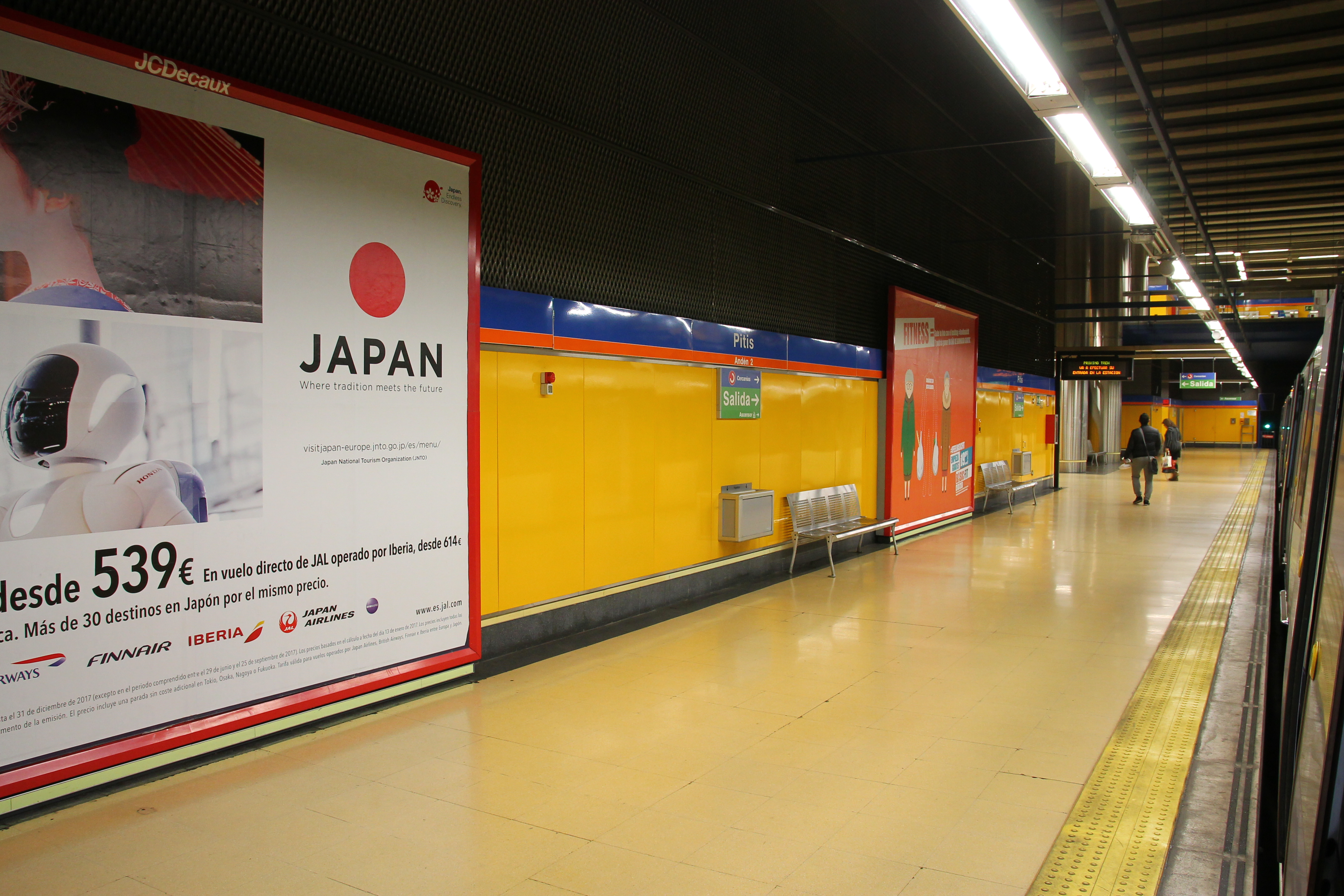

General information
- Location: Fuencarral-El Pardo, Madrid; Spain
- Coordinates: 40.4951038°N 3.7258413°W
- System: Madrid Metro station
- Owner: CRTM
- Operator: CRTM

Construction
- Accessible: yes

Other information
- Fare zone: A

History
- Opened: 29 March 1999; 27 years ago

Services
Preceding station	Madrid Metro	Following station
Arroyofresno towards Hospital del Henares	Line 7	Terminus
Out of system interchange
Preceding station	Cercanías Madrid	Following station
Las Rozas towards Príncipe Pío	C-7	Mirasierra-Paco de Lucía towards Alcalá de Henares
Pinar de las Rozas towards Santa María de la Alameda or Cercedilla	C-8	Mirasierra-Paco de Lucía towards Guadalajara
Location
- Location within Madrid

Pitis [ˈpi.tis] is a station on Line 7 of the Madrid Metro and the northern terminus of that line. It is located in fare Zone A. The station offers connection to Cercanías Madrid via Pitis railway station.
