= Istrian Demarcation =

Croatian legal document from 1325

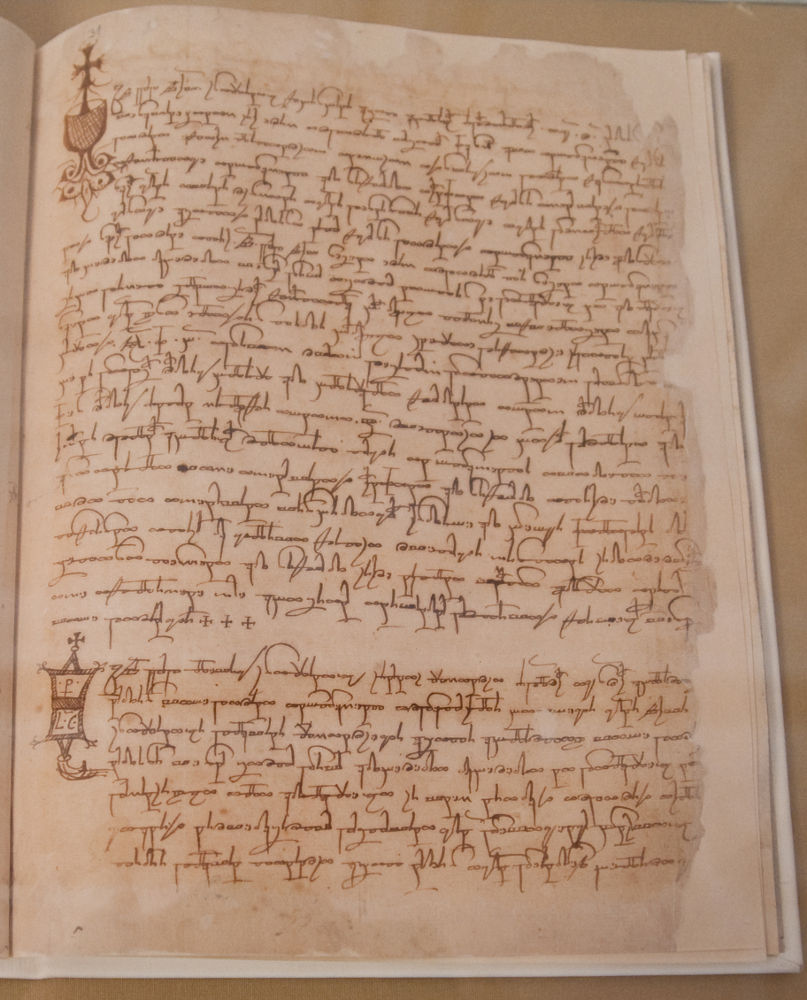
Istrian Demarcation, State Archive in Rijeka

The Istrian Demarcation or Istrian Perambulation (Croatian: Istarski razvod) is a legal document on the demarcation of territories between neighbouring municipalities in Istria, currently shared by Croatia, Slovenia, and Italy. More precisely, between the possessions of the Patriarchate of Aquileia, the Count of Gorica and Pazin and the representatives of the Venetian Republic. In addition to the borders that were being agreed upon only in disputed parts of Istria, the Istrian Demarcation also established the payment of fees for the use of forests, vineyards and pastures.

Although the document dates itself to 1325, this is sometimes corrected to 1275 on the basis of other internal evidence.

== Authenticity ==
The authenticity of the Istrian Demarcation is disputed. The original document does not survive, only later copies. The earliest copies are in the Croatian language and Glagolitic script and date to the 16th century. All Italian and Latin copies are based on a Croatian Glagolitic version. There are definite discrepancies in the surviving text.

Carlo De Franceschi rejected it. Pietro Kandler, recognizing the discrepancies, still accepted the document as basically genuine. Milko Kos and Metod Dolenc rejected its genuineness, arguing that it was fabricated in Habsburg Istria in the mid-15th century on the basis of several authentic records of perambulations found in the archives. Croatian historiography in general has sought to vindicate the document. Luka Kirac, Branko Fučić and Josip Bratulić all argued for its value as a historical source, even if partially falsified. Bratulić, especially, has argued that even if fabricated during a border dispute, it must contain accurate material to have had any credibility whatsoever.

== Origin ==
The document was probably the result of separates documents being combined into the Istrian Demarcation in 1325. A commission to map and record the borders was established. The scribes of the commission were three: one to write the data in Latin, one to write it in German and one to write the data in Croatian. The data used by the commission were old documents of individual municipalities or labels found on the trees and rocks that were used for demarcation purposes. In addition, witnesses were questions on memory of the borders under oath.

There are no 14th century originals but two copies are preserved, both in Croatian (one found in Momjan, the other in Kršan). The original text in Croatian was written in the Glagolitic script by a priest called Mikul from Gologorica. The copy from Kršan was written in 1502, and is kept at the University Library in Zagreb. It was written by Levac Križanić. The copy from Momjan was also supposedly written by Kižanić.

== Contents ==
The Istrian Demarcation vaguely shows the social organization, economic conditions and life of the rural communities in medieval Istria. The document was often claimed as unauthentic, mostly because of political reasons. The modern edition was first published by Ante Starčević in 1852.

The language of the document is not very different from other Croatian medieval legal texts, that is, the non-liturgical texts written in standard Chakavian with a low degree of Church Slavonic influence. However, even the younger copies retain some older features of Croatian (e.g. the dual form of some nouns) and minor traces of Church Slavonic (e.g. the use of absolute construction of the dative case). The Demarcation is also famous for referring to Croatian as hrvacki:

I ondi gospodin Menart sluga naprid sta i pokaza listi prave v keh se udržahu zapisani razvodi i kunfini meju Sovińakom z Vrhom i Plzetom, ki bihu pisani na let Božjih 1195, ke listi ondi pred nas trih nodari postaviše, keh ta gospoda izibra: jednoga latinskoga, a drugoga nimškoga, a tretoga hrvackoga, da imamo vsaki na svoj orijinal pisat, poimeno od mesta do mesta, kako se niže udrži, po vsoj deželi. I tako mi niže imenovani nodari preda vsu tu gospodu pročtesmo kako se v ńih udrži. I tako onde obe strane se sjediniše i kuntentaše i kordaše i razvodi svojimi zlameniji postaviše, i jednoj i drugoj strani pisaše listi jazikom latinskim i hrvackim, a gospoda sebe shraniše jazikom nemškim.

Historian Dražen Vlahov says ‘The Croatian Glagolitic document of the demarcation of the holdings of certain Istrian municipalities, i.e. of their feudal lords (Duke Albrecht of Pazin and Gorica, Patriarch Raimund of Aquileia and Venetian authorities in Istria), also known as the Istrian Demarcation, originally dated 5 May 1325, and written, as stated in the text, in three languages (Latin, German and Croatian) in three originals, written by three selected scribes: a priest called Mikula for Duke Albrecht who wrote in Croatian in the Glagolitic script, Mr Pernar from Gorica who wrote in German and Mr Ivan from Krmina who wrote it in Latin. All three specimens are considered original. None of the original documents were preserved but two copies were preserved in cursive Glagolitic in Croatian, three copies in Latin and several copies in Italian. According to experts, the Latin and Italian copies were made on the basis of the translation of the Croatian-Glagolitic specimens.’

Vlahov denies the claims of Milko Kos and Josip Bratulić that the Croatian Glagolitic copy of the Istrian Demarcation, found in Momjan in Istria in 1880, was written by an unknown author on the basis of an unpreserved copy of the notary Levac Križanić. The analysis the manuscripts of both Glagolitic copies of the Istrian Demarcation (one from Momjan and one from Kršan) written in Glagolitic cursive script concludes that both Croatian copies of the document in question were written by the same person, i.e. Levac Križanić, and that the unanalysed copy from Momjan originated before the Kršan copy, probably in 1530s.

== See also ==
- List of Glagolitic manuscripts (1500–1599)
- Lists of Glagolitic manuscripts

== Literature ==
- Bratulić, Josip (1978). Istarski razvod: Studija i tekst. Pula. Čakavski sabor.
