= Paz =

Paz may refer to:

== Businesses and organisations ==
- Pavlovo Bus Factory or Pavlovsky Avtobusny Zavod (PAZ), a Russian bus company
  - PAZ-3205, a common Soviet midibus model
- Paz Oil Company, an Israeli fuel company
- Building Societies of Peace, or PAZ, a Mexican political party

== People ==
- Paz (name), including a list of people and fictional characters with the name
- Paula Tooths (born 1978), also known as Paz, a British-Brazilian journalist and executive producer

== Other uses ==
- Paz, Croatia, a village
- Paz (satellite), a Spanish military Earth observation satellite
- The Paz Show, a TV show featuring Paz the Penguin
- Preußische Allgemeine Zeitung, a German newspaper
- El Tajín National Airport, Tihuatlán, Veracruz, Mexico, IATA code PAZ

== See also ==
- La Paz (disambiguation)
- Doña Paz, a Philippine ferry
