= Peñagrande (Madrid Metro) =

Madrid Metro station

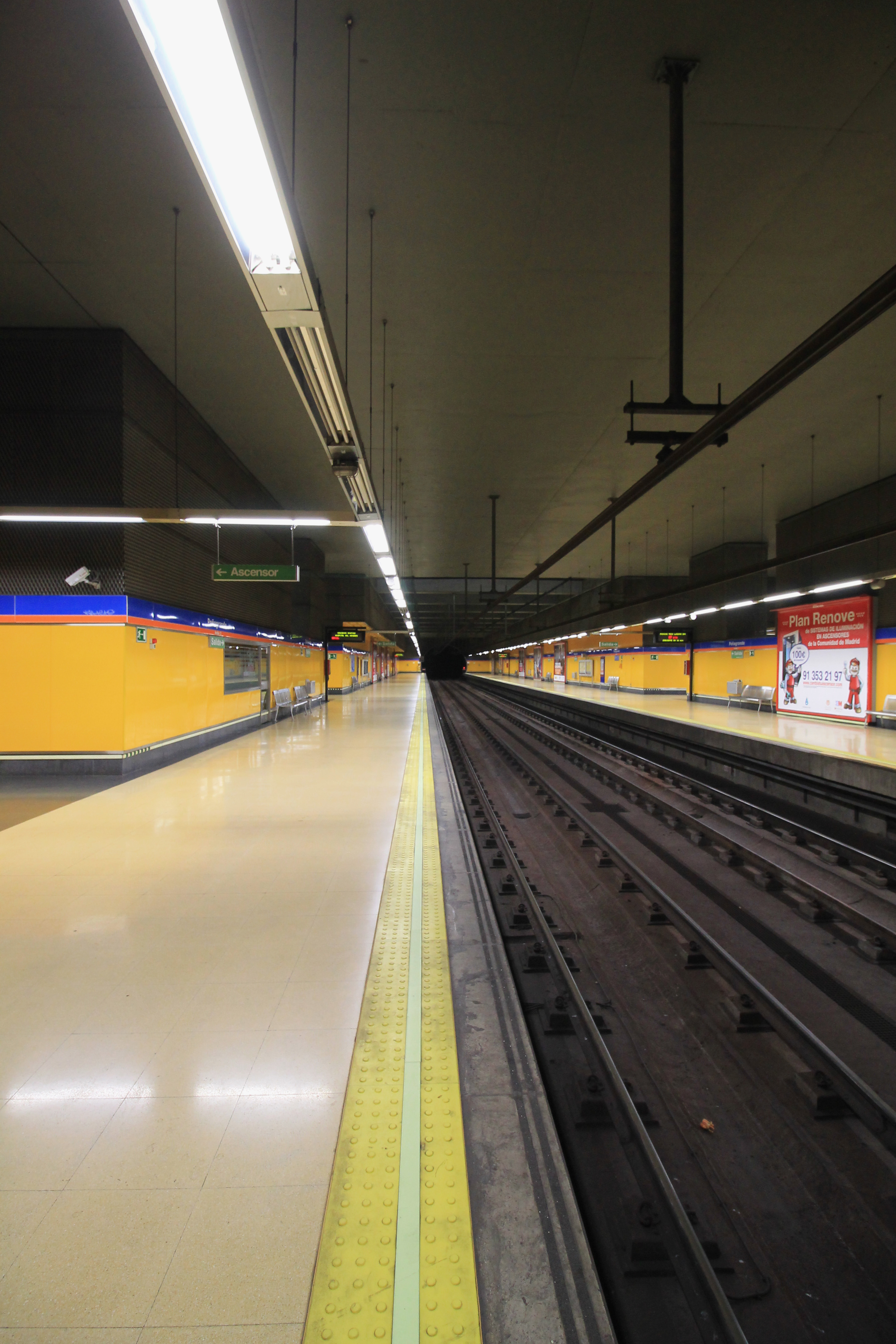

General information
- Location: Fuencarral-El Pardo, Madrid; Spain
- Coordinates: 40.4759259°N 3.715823°W
- System: Madrid Metro station
- Owner: CRTM
- Operator: CRTM

Construction
- Accessible: yes

Other information
- Fare zone: A

History
- Opened: 29 March 1999; 27 years ago

Services
Preceding station	Madrid Metro	Following station
Antonio Machado towards Hospital del Henares	Line 7	Avenida de la Ilustración towards Pitis
Location
- Location within Madrid

Peñagrande [ˌpeɲaˈɣɾande] is a station on Line 7 of the Madrid Metro, serving the barrio of Peñagrande. It is located in fare Zone A.
