= La Paz (disambiguation) =

La Paz is the administrative and legislative capital of Bolivia.

Ciudad de la Paz is the capital of Equatorial Guinea.

La Paz may also refer to:

== Bolivia ==
- La Paz Department (Bolivia)
- La Paz Municipality, Bolivia
- La Paz River

== Argentina ==
- La Paz, Córdoba, a town
- La Paz, Entre Ríos, a city
- La Paz Department, Catamarca
- La Paz Department, Mendoza
  - La Paz, Mendoza, a town, capital of the department

== Colombia ==
- La Paz, Cesar
- La Paz, Santander

== Honduras ==
- La Paz, Honduras
- La Paz Department (Honduras)

== Mexico ==
- La Paz, Baja California Sur, the capital of Baja California Sur state
  - La Paz Municipality, Baja California Sur
- La Paz, State of Mexico, a large suburb of Mexico City

== Paraguay ==
- La Paz, Paraguay

== Philippines ==
- La Paz, Abra
- La Paz, Agusan del Sur
- La Paz, Iloilo City, a district of Iloilo City
- La Paz, Leyte
- La Paz, Tarlac

== United States ==
- La Paz County, Arizona
  - La Paz, Arizona, a ghost town
- La Paz, California, headquarters of the United Farm Workers
- La Paz, Indiana

== Uruguay ==
- La Paz, Canelones
- La Paz, Colonia

== Other places ==
- Lapaz (Accra), Ghana
- La Paz (Madrid), a neighbourhood of Madrid, Spain named after Hospital Universitario La Paz
- La Paz Department (El Salvador)
- La Paz Waterfall, Costa Rica
- La Paz station (Caracas), a Venezuelan metro station
- La Paz metro station (State of Mexico), a Mexico City Metro station
- La Luz–La Paz station, a Málaga Metro station

== Other uses ==
- La Paz (B&O), a railroad car
- La Paz (band), a Scottish rock band
- La Paz (crater), a crater on Mars
- La Paz F.C., a professional football club from La Paz, Bolivia
- La Paz incident, during the American Civil War
- La Paz Cigars, a brand of cigars made by Swedish Match

== See also ==
- La Paz Department (disambiguation)
- La Paz Municipality (disambiguation)
- Paz (disambiguation)
- The Peace (disambiguation)
