= City of Peace =

City of Peace may refer to:

- Jerusalem, from a folk etymology
- Myrhorod, Ukraine, whose name literally means "city of peace"
- Round city of Baghdad, (Arabic: Madinat al-Salam) the original core of Baghdad, Iraq
- Hiroshima, Japan, proclaimed a City of Peace in 1949
- Ciudad de la Paz ("City of the Peace" in Spanish), the new capital of Equatorial Guinea
- Osnabrück, Germany, in recognition of the Peace of Westphalia negotiated there
- Sharm El Sheikh, Egypt, sometimes known as the "city of peace" due to the many diplomatic conferences held there
- Ypres, known as the city of peace after World War 1

== See also ==
- Dar es Salaam, the largest city of Tanzania, whose name translated from Arabic means "Abode of Peace"
- La Paz (disambiguation), the name of several cities; the name means "peace" in Spanish
