= Jaime Cárdenas =

Jaime Cárdenas may refer to:

- Jaime Cárdenas Gracia (born 1960), Mexican politician
- Jaime Cárdenas Mendieta (born 1972), Bolivian politician, governor of Chuquisaca in 2014–2015
- Jaime Cárdenas Pardo (born 1987), Bolivian serial killer
