= Deutsche Schule Madrid =

- Colegio Alemán Madrid

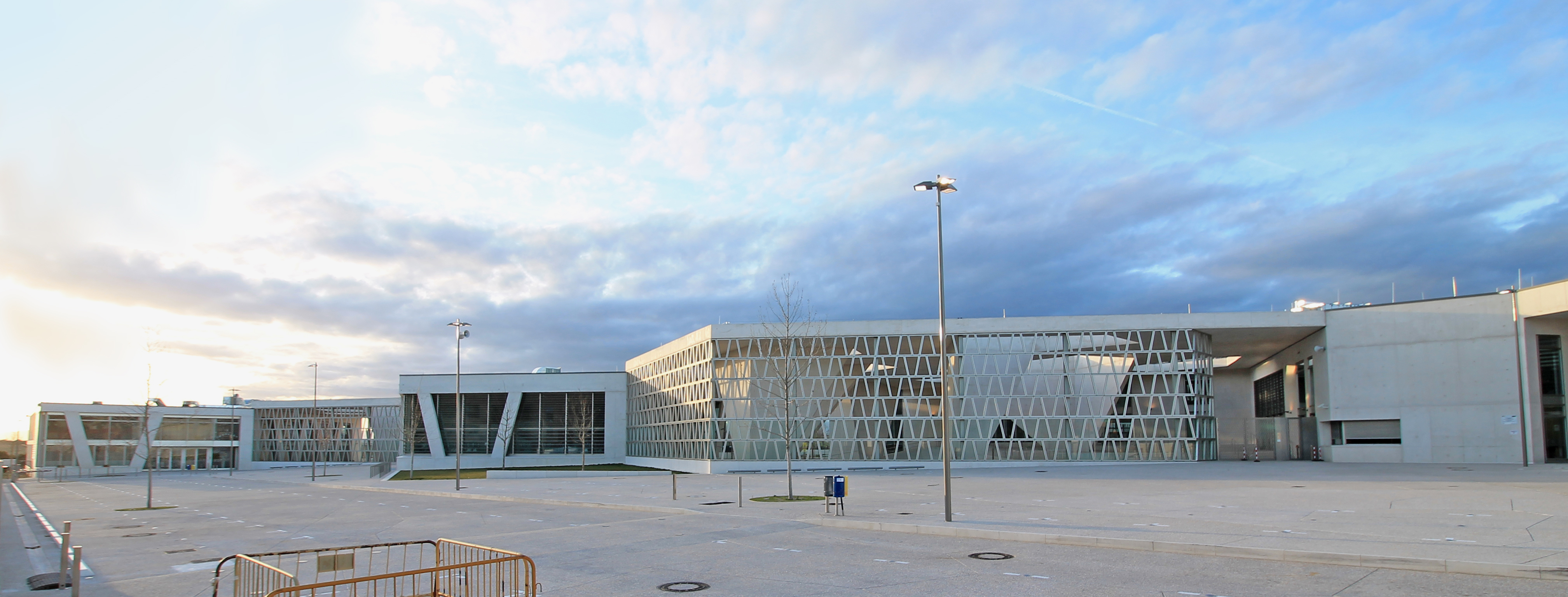
- Current campus of the school

Location
- Monasterio de Guadalupe 7, 28049; 40.50759°N 3.70470°W

Information
- Website: dsmadrid.org

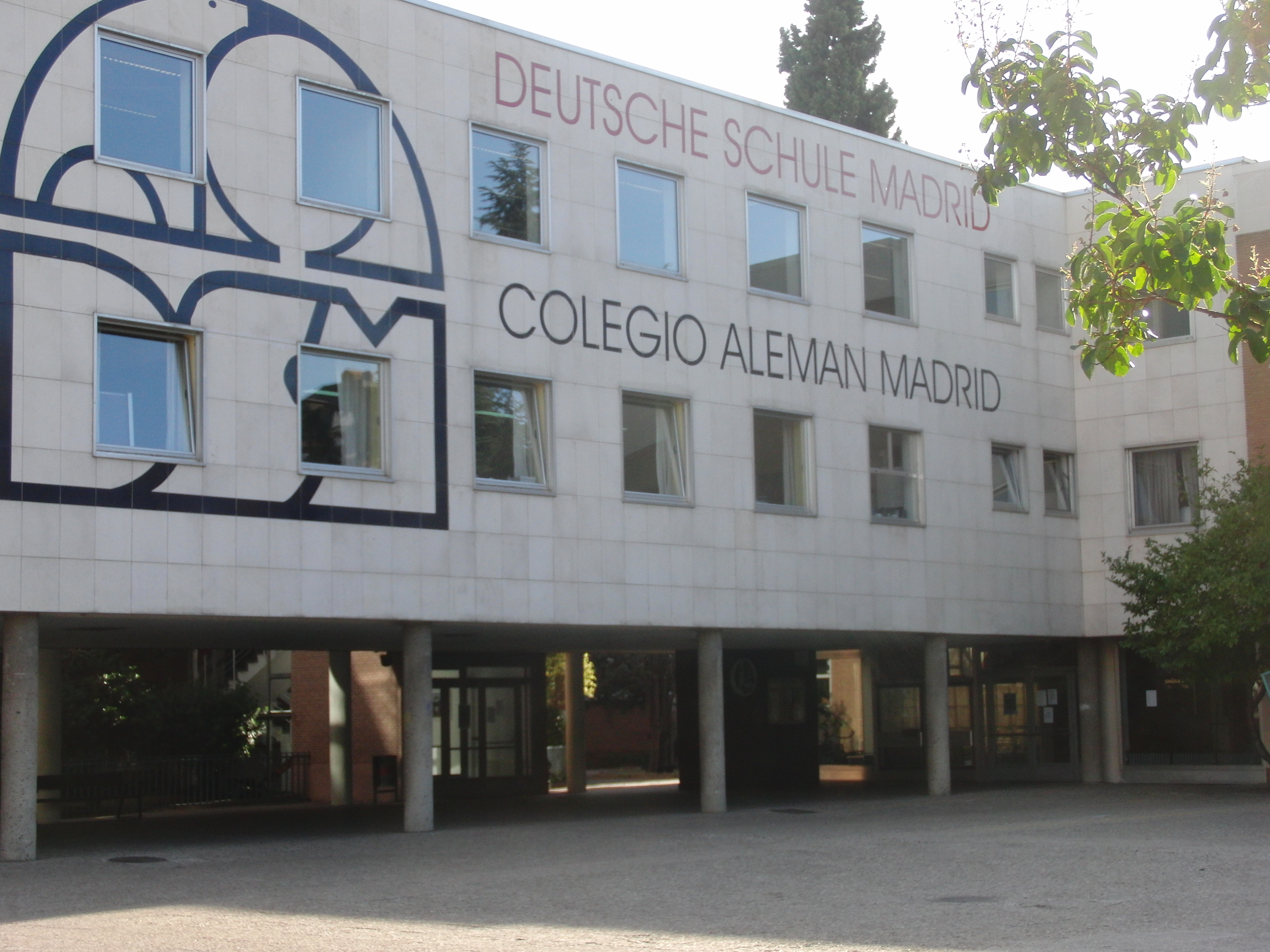
Former campus of the Deutsche Schule Madrid

Deutsche Schule Madrid (DSM: Spanish: Colegio Alemán Madrid) is a German international school in Madrid, Spain. It includes both the primary and secondary levels, ending with the Abitur.

The German international school in Madrid used to be located at Avenida Concha Espina 32 in 28016 Madrid. During the summer of 2015 the school moved to new premises at Monasterio de Guadalupe 7, 28049 Montecarmelo, Fuencarral-El Pardo. It was the largest civil project of Germany located outside of German territory. The official opening in October 2015 was attended by Mayor of Madrid Manuela Carmena, the then German Minister of Foreign Affairs Frank-Walter Steinmeier, Spanish politician and DSM alumnus Íñigo Méndez de Vigo, and businesswoman Esther Alcocer.
