= Gradinje, Cerovlje =

Gradinje Gradigne
- Village
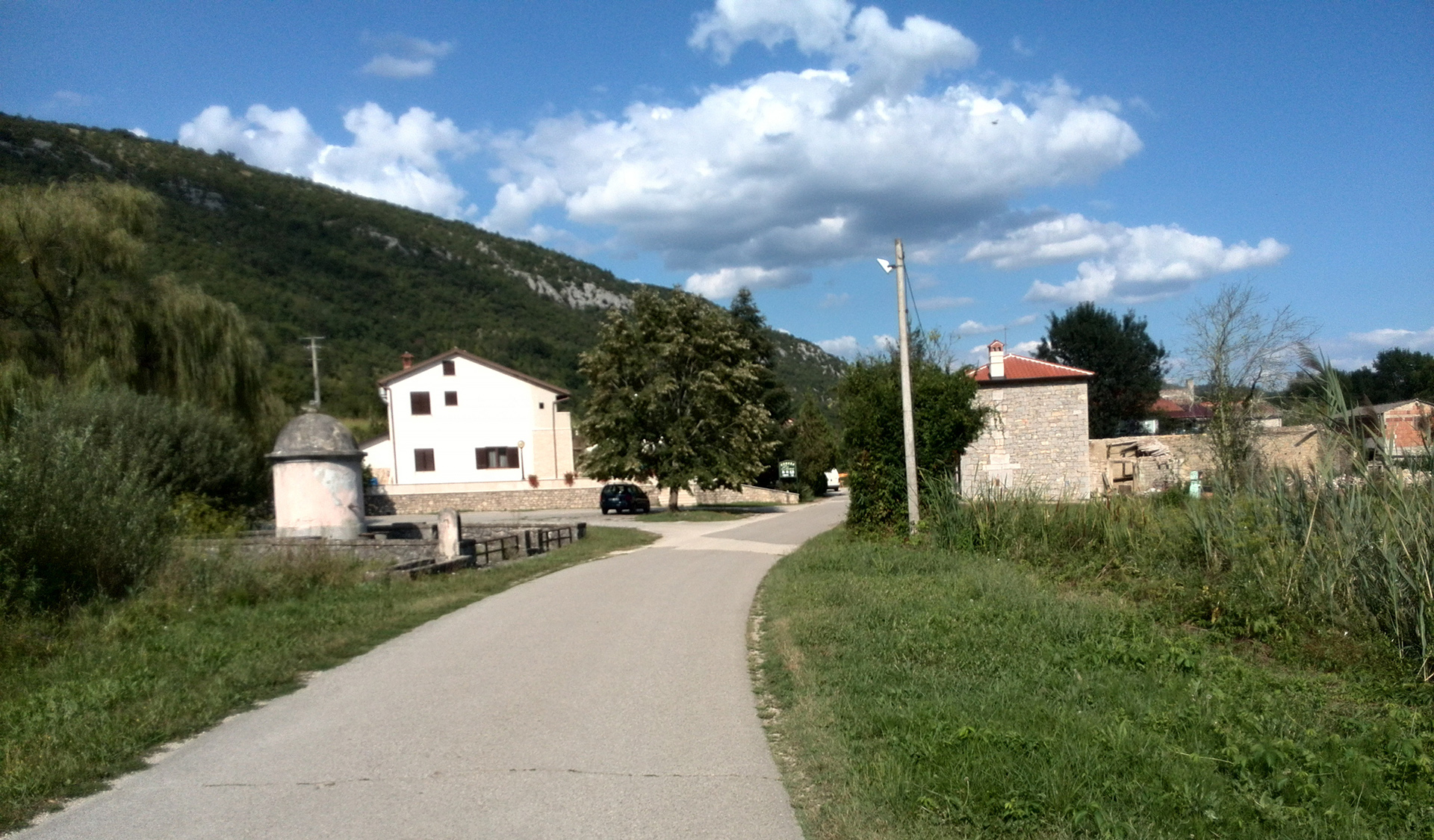

- Location within Croatia
- Coordinates: 45°15′30″N 14°4′29″E
- Country: Croatia
- County: Istria
- Municipality: Cerovlje

Area
  - Total: 6.0 km^{2} (2.3 sq mi)
- Elevation: 210 m (690 ft)

Population (2021)
  - Total: 33
  - Density: 5.5/km^{2} (14/sq mi)
- Time zone: UTC+1 (CET)
  - Summer (DST): UTC+2 (CEST)
- Postal code: 52402 Cerovlje
- Area code: 052

Gradinje (Italian: Gradigne) is a village in the Istria County, Croatia. Administratively it belongs to the municipality of Cerovlje. Until recently, the village was inhabited by Istro-Romanians who could speak the Istro-Romanian language.

== Demographics ==
According to the 2021 census, the population of Gradinje was 33. It was 43 in 2011.

Population number according to the census
1857	1869	1880	1890	1900	1910	1921	1931	1948	1953	1961	1971	1981	1991	2001	2011	2021
279	288	260	266	270	277	266	267	233	204	130	102	74	58	43	43	33
