= Carlo De Franceschi =

Italian historian and politician

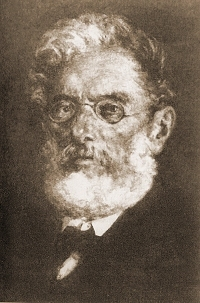
- Born: 16 October 1809; Moncalvo di Pisino, near Pisino, Austrian Empire
- Died: 8 January 1893 (aged 83); Moncalvo di Pisino, Austria-Hungary
- Occupations: Historian, politician

Carlo De Franceschi (16 October 1809 – 8 January 1893) was an Italian historian and politician.

== Biography ==
Carlo De Franceschi was born on 16 October 1809 in Moncalvo di Pisino, in Central Istria, near Pisino, to Giuseppe De Franceschi and Lambertina Peschle from Volosca. He was initially taught by the local parish priest, then went to study at the German language school of Pisino, and then in Fiume (Rijeka), completing high school at the theological seminary of Gorizia. After pressure from his father, he went to study at the faculty of law in Graz, graduating in 1832.

De Franceschi held an aversion for Austria and harbored irredendist sentiments. During his years as a student he had come into contact with the ideological ideas of the Carbonari. He wrote some satirical and anti-Austrian pamphlets, spreading them among his Istrian friends, especially criticizing Baron Friedrich von Grimschitz, then circular captain of Istria, based in Pisino. In 1833 he started the year of practice to enter in the magistratura, following the cousnel of his friend, judge Canciani. In 1846 he was named attuario criminale at the court of Rovigno. In 1844 he was suspected of attempting to introduce Mazzinian pamphlets in Istria, because of a letter he wrote to Canciani. In April 1848 he was even credited as one of the most "suspicious and dangerous individuals".

He then decided to intensify his political activity. He had a secret meeting in his native Moncalvo with fellow irredendists, where it was decided to employ a firm yet legalitarian line of conduct. He was also offered to candidate for the Austrian constituency, which he accepted, being elected to the constituency in Pisino on 17 June. He and the other deputies protested against the entry of their land into the German Confederation, opposing the Germanisation and Slavism.

In 1849 he published in Vienna a polemical article proving the "Italianness of Istria" (Per l'italianità dell' Istria). Because of his anti-Austrian sentiment and Italian irredentism, he earned himself the epithets "Mazzini apostle", "Istrian separatist" and "state provocateur", which is why he was forced to retire during the reform of the judiciary in the Monarchy in 1854 and was forced to return to his birthplace. Later he worked in a Fiume law office. He returned to political activity with the restoration of the constitution in 1861. From 1861 to 1876, he served as secretary of the Istrian Parliament in Parenzo.

From 1843 and his association with Pietro Kandler in Trieste, he also engaged in scientific work, which he did systematically until his death. He was interested in the archeology and history of Istria. He published scientific works in Italian in the journals of the Margraviate of Istria. His main work on Istria, Historical Notes, published in Parenzo, is the first attempt to present a complete history of Istrian history from ancient times to 1815.
