= Paz (name) =

Paz is a surname with Spanish, Portuguese, and Hebrew origins. In Spanish and Portuguese, paz translates to 'peace', while in Hebrew פָּז roughly translates to 'gold' or 'fine gold'.

As a female given name, it is a short form of Spanish María de la Paz or Portuguese Maria da Paz.

== People with the surname ==
- José María Paz (1791–1854), Argentine soldier
- José C. Paz (1842–1912), Argentine politician
- Luis Paz (1854–1920), Bolivian jurist
- Víctor Paz Estenssoro (1907–2001), Bolivian politician
- Octavio Paz (1914–1998), Mexican writer and Nobel Prize winner
- Joana da Paz (1925–2023), Brazilian activist
- María Inmaculada Paz-Andrade (1928–2022), Spanish physicist
- Pilar Paz Pasamar (1932–2019), Spanish poet and writer
- Rodrigo Paz (disambiguation), the name of several people
- Jaime Paz Zamora (born 1939), Bolivian politician
- Rubén Paz (born 1959), Uruguayan football player
- Milagros Paz (born 1962), Venezuelan journalist and politician
- Vinny Paz (born 1962), American boxer
- Mercedes Paz (born 1966), Argentine tennis player
- Rodrigo Paz Pereira (born 1967), Bolivian politician, president of Bolivia since 2025
- Lorna Paz (born 1970), Colombian actress
- Bárbara Paz (born 1974), Brazilian actress, producer and film director
- Vinnie Paz (born 1977), Italian-American rapper in the group Jedi Mind Tricks
- Espinoza Paz (born 1981), stage name of Isidro Chávez Espinoza, Mexican musician
- Or Paz (born 1988), Israeli comedian
- Pedro Paz (born 1994), Portuguese footballer
- Samera Paz (born 1994), American artist
- Bruno Paz (born 1998), Portuguese footballer
- Kevin de Paz (born 2006), Belizean crime victim

== People with the given name ==
- Paz Lenchantin (born 1973), Argentine-American musician of French descent
- Paz Vega (born 1976), Spanish actress
- Paz de la Calzada, Spanish-born American visual artist
- Paz de la Huerta (born 1984), American actress and model

== Fictional characters ==
- Paz Ortega Andrade, a character in the Metal Gear series
- Paz, a character in Ghost in the Shell
