= Borut, Croatia =

Borut Borutto
- Village
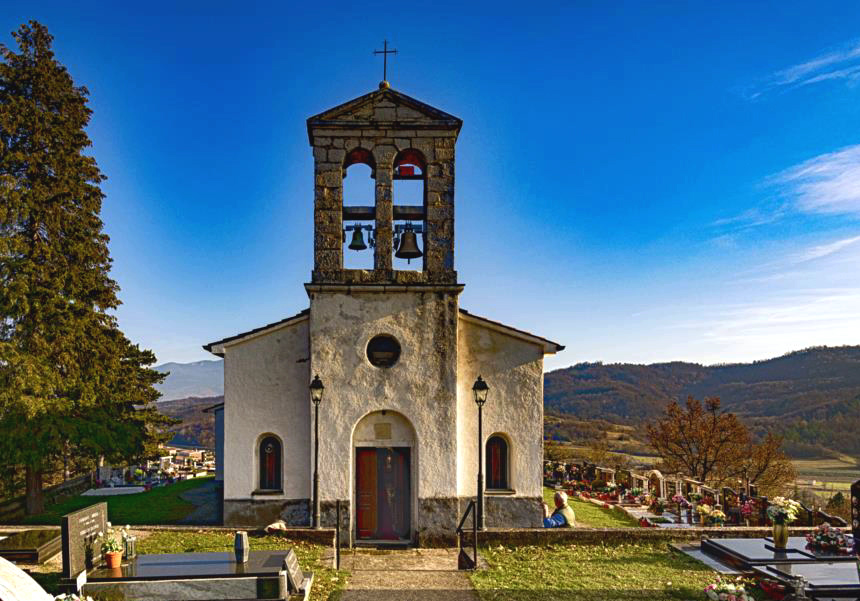

- Location within Croatia
- Coordinates: 45.3075727°N 14.0103943°E
- Country: Croatia
- County: Istria
- Municipality: Cerovlje

Area
  - Total: 5.4 sq mi (13.9 km^{2})

Population (2021)
  - Total: 180
  - Density: 34/sq mi (13/km^{2})
- Time zone: UTC+1 (CET)
  - Summer (DST): UTC+2 (CEST)
- Postal code: 52402 Cerovlje
- Area code: 052

Borut (Italian: Borutto) is a village in Istria, Croatia. The name Borut or Borutto is the common name for several small villages and hamlets: Budaki, Buzići, Čuleti, Dausi, Grdinići, Grgurići, Moloni, Orlovići, Poljanice and Sandalji. When Istria was part of the Kingdom of Italy, the village was called Borutto di Bogliuno which was located in the Province of Pola.

On top of the largest hill in Borut is the Church of St Michael the Archangel built in the 13th century and enlarged in 1787. It has a Romanesque semi-circular sanctuary and a Venetian style high altar. A small distance from the train station is the Church of the Holy Spirit reconstructed in 1560 by Vid Vitulic as indicated by the Glagolitic inscription above the entrance door.

There is evidence of human settlement in and around Borut by the Histri, an ancient Venetic tribe and an Indo-European people. The area was part of the Roman Empire for centuries and subsequently the Byzantine Empire. During the 13th century, the village belonged to the Patriarchate of Aquileia when the Church of St Michael was built. However, the earliest mention of the village comes from a document called the Urbar of Pazin (Pisino) written in 1498. From the 15th century until 1797, Borut existed at the border of the Venetian and Austrian Empires: at times being under the control of the Republic of Venice and at other times under Austrian Habsburg control. Throughout the centuries Borut was inhabited by the descendants of Venetian and Austrian nobility and the land cultivators and tenants which they employed. Production of wine, olives, and various fruits and vegetables was commonplace.

In 1797, Borut was incorporated into the Austrian Empire along with all of Istria. Because of the deposited natural clay along the stream which flows through Borut, brick production started to be cultivated in the village in 1803. The clay was once dug and shaped by hand and baked in field kilns. Since 1904, this tradition was industrialized when Austrian entrepreneur Jakob Ludvig Münz built a circular kiln, a dryer, a chimney and a machine shop with presses for molding bricks. After World War I, Borut became part of the Kingdom of Italy until 1947 when the village and all of Istria was annexed by Communist Yugoslavian forces. In 1991, it became part of the Republic of Croatia.

Borut is well known for the Daus family (Famiglia Daus) who settled in the region in the 15th century, descendants of Austrian and Venetian nobility. Dausi, one of the hamlets in Borut, is named after the Daus family.

== Demographics ==
According to the 2021 census, its population was 180.

== See also ==
- List of Glagolitic inscriptions (16th century)
- Istrian Railway
