= Oslići =

Oslići Olici
- Village
- Location within Croatia
- Coordinates: 45.3391595°N 14.0011091°E
- Country: Croatia
- County: Istria
- Municipality: Cerovlje

Area
  - Total: 2.1 sq mi (5.4 km^{2})

Population (2021)
  - Total: 55
  - Density: 26/sq mi (10/km^{2})
- Time zone: UTC+1 (CET)
  - Summer (DST): UTC+2 (CEST)
- Postal code: 52402 Cerovlje
- Area code: 052

Oslići (Italian: Olici) is a village in Istria, Croatia.

== Demographics ==
According to the 2021 census, its population was 55.
