= Peñagrande =

Neighborhood in Madrid, Spain

Coordinates: 40°28′41″N 3°43′32″W

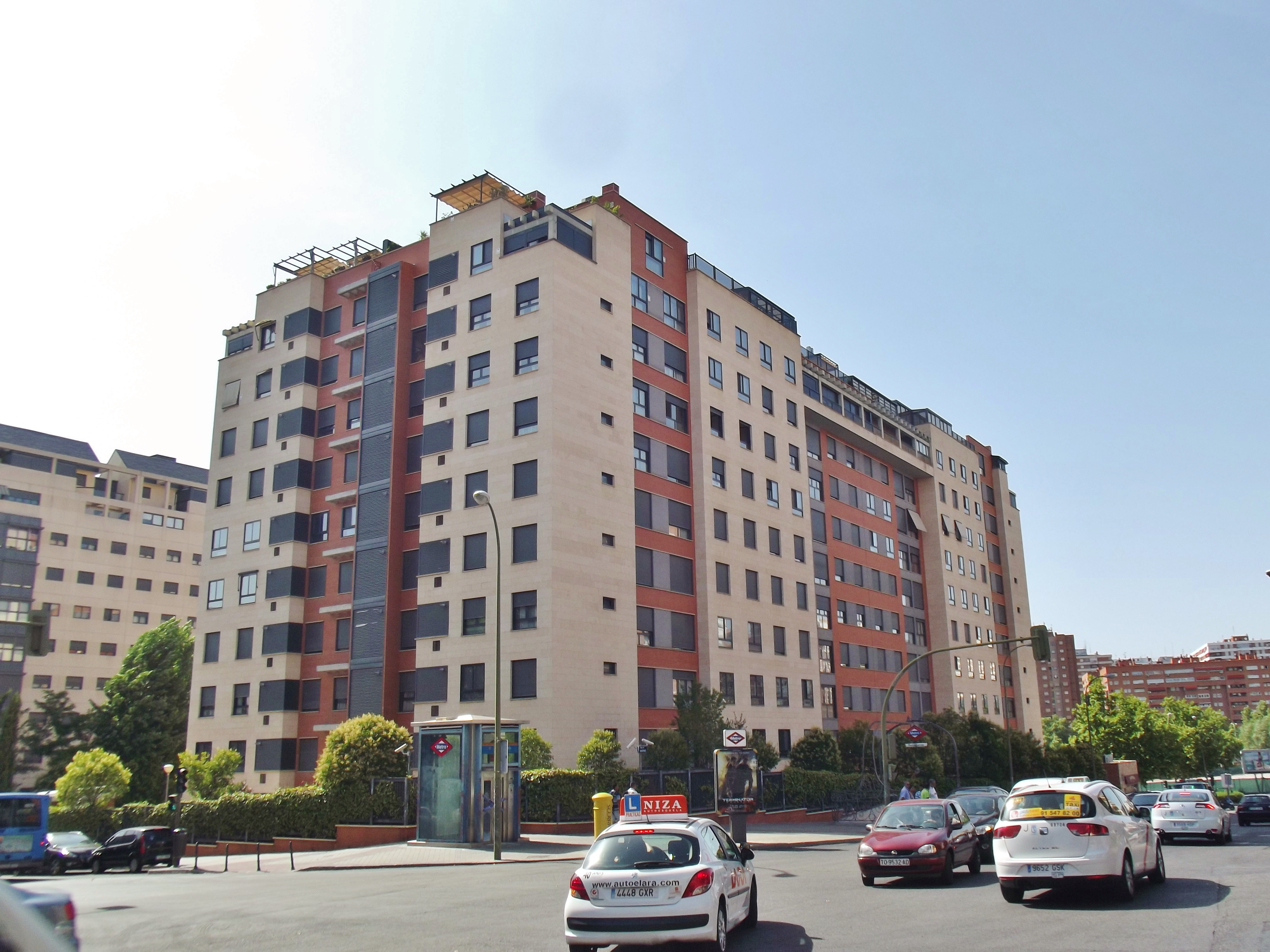
Edificio entre C. de la Bañeza Av. Monforte de Lemos y C. Ganapanes

Peñagrande [ˌpeɲaˈɣɾande] is a neighborhood to the north of Madrid's city centre, in the district of Fuencarral-El Pardo. Peñagrande is Madrid's 26th largest neighborhood in terms of land area, its 10th largest in population and 77th largest in population density.

== Statistics ==
- Land area: 2.8873 km^{2} (713 acres)
- Population: 44,262 (2017)
- Population density: 153.3 inhabitants per hectare

== Transportation ==
Line 7 of the Metro Madrid is the only one giving service to the neighbourhood. The current metro stations are Lacoma, Avenida de la Ilustración and Peñagrande.
