= Belaj, Istria County =

Village in Istria County, Croatia

Belaj Bellai
- Village
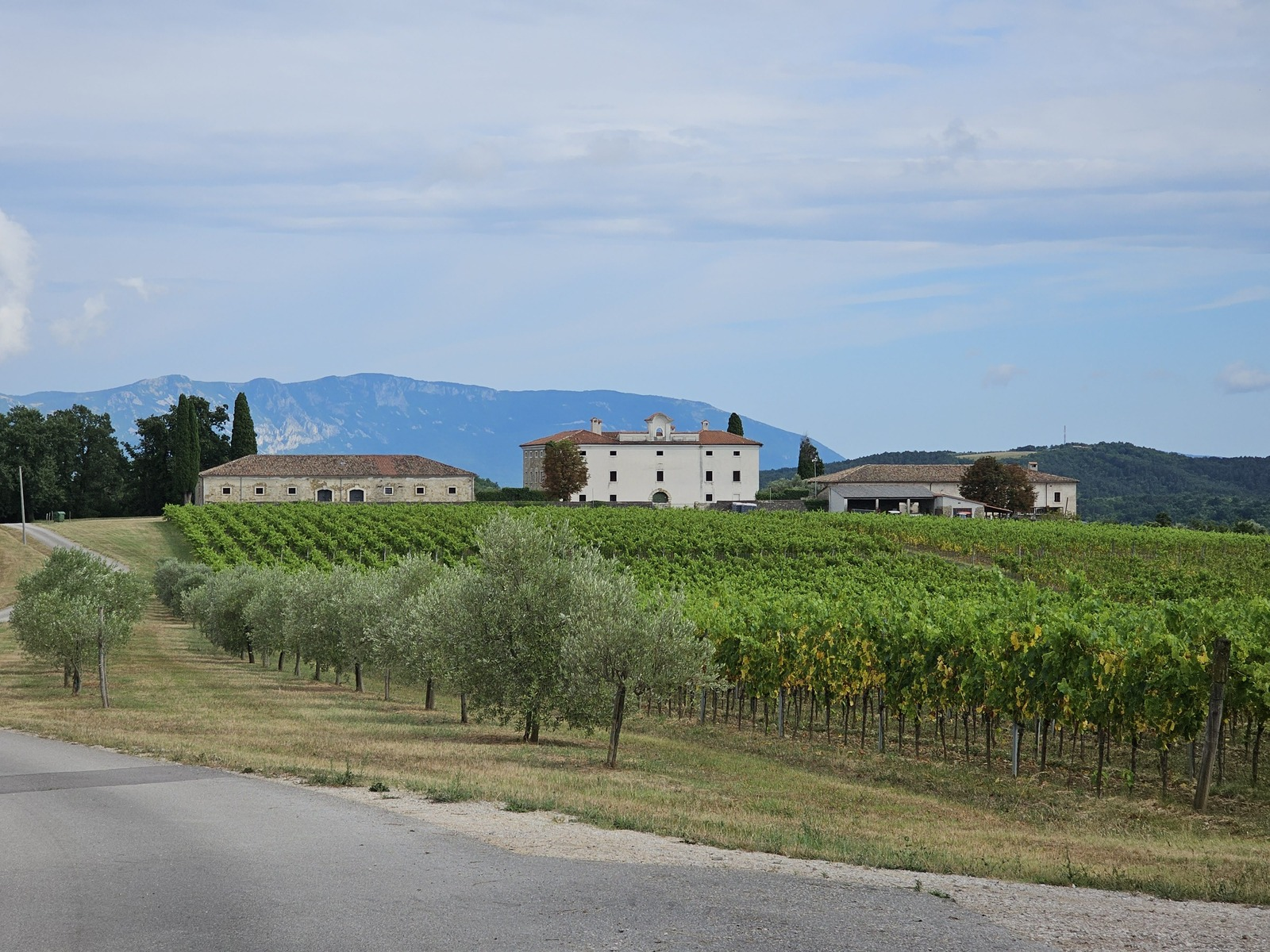
- Belaj Castle with surrounding vineyards

- Location within Croatia
- Coordinates: 45°16′16″N 14°06′37″E
- Country: Croatia
- County: Istria
- Municipality: Cerovlje

Area
  - Total: 1.9 sq mi (5.0 km^{2})
- Elevation: 690 ft (210 m)

Population (2021)
  - Total: 12
  - Density: 6.2/sq mi (2.4/km^{2})
- Time zone: UTC+1 (CET)
  - Summer (DST): UTC+2 (CEST)
- Postal code: 52434 Cerovlje
- Area code: 052
- Website: www.dvoracbelaj.com

Belaj (Italian: Bellai) is a small village and Baroque Castle in Istria County, Croatia, in the municipality of Cerovlje. Castle Belaj is a registered Historical Heritage. Castle Belaj historically has numerous hectares of vineyard. In 2017 Belaj Castle opens to the public. In 2011, the population of the village is 16. In the vicinity of the village is another castle Posert.

== Description ==
It is located in the north-eastern part of Istria, on a road connecting Paz and Šušnjevica, 3 kilometres (2 mi) to the south-east of Paz, and 4.7 kilometres (2.9 mi) north-west of Šušnjevica, in the middle of a vineyard. It is 12 kilometres (7.5 mi) east from the municipality center Cerovlje. In 2017, Belaj Castle has functioning degustation room, authentic restaurant, delicatessen shop, wine production, wine cellar and first floor of the central building of the estate open for the guests.

== Castle history ==
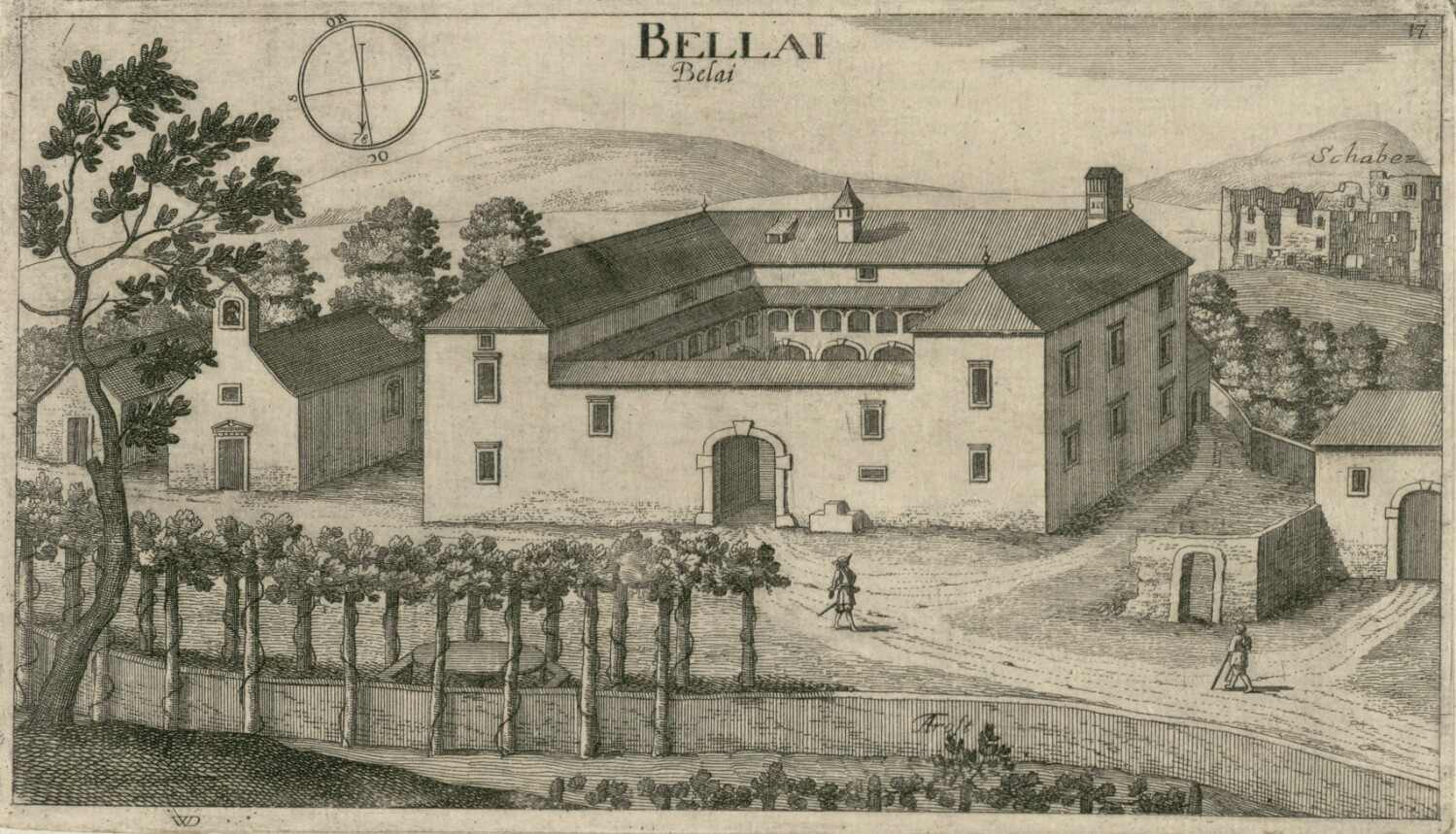
Belaj in an engraving from 1679

The castle is on a small hill, 210 metres (690 ft) above sea level, along the local road. The castle was mentioned in 1367 as Bray in a document by Aquileia patriarch in which was given away for one year to his vassal Dujam of St. Vitus from Rijeka. After the Uskok War (1615–17) in which was devastated castel St. Martin at Posert, the previous center of the estate, Daniel Barbo von Waxenstein built this castle in the vicinity as a new residence. It was in the possession of his descendants until 1668 when along Paz, Čepić, and Kožljak was sold to Johann Weikhard of the Auersperg noble family. All this castles and estates Johann united in a single manor Wachsenstein (Kožljak), and the center from the medieval castle Kožljak by which was named, was transferred to Belaj. Johann heirs reconstructed the castle in the Baroque style to rustic castle in the end of 17th and 18th century. It was in their property until 1945 when the Yugoslav government nationalized it and given to the use of local agricultural cooperative.

Today the castle is a registered monument of cultural heritage, privately owned, partially renovated and very well-preserved. The central residential part of the palace is of rectangular layout, 40 by 20 metres (131 by 66 ft), with four-storey wings. On three sides of the inner courtyard is closed by semicircular arcades on the ground floor and first floor, while the north-west wing entrance closes with facade decorated with stone portal and shallow attic with a distaff and a bell from the 18th century when the wing was upgraded for one floor. The appearance of the castle before the intervention was preserved in the Valvasor drawing from 1679. The walls of the gallery on the first floor until recently were painted landscapes depicting the castle and its surroundings. Left and right of the residential palace in the same line are located farm buildings with basements, stables and barns, which are connected with the castle high surrounding walls. These are long and narrow single-storey buildings with gabled roof.

On the ground floor is the chapel of St. Henry II, with baroque marble altar and painted altarpiece, tombstones of family Barbo and tombstones of noble families from Kršan, Kožljak and Paz transmitted in Belaj from St. Mary on Čepić lake after the closure of the Paulists monastery in 1783.

== Demographics ==
According to the 2021 census, its population was 12. It was 16 in 2011.

Population number according to the census
1857	1869	1880	1890	1900	1910	1921	1931	1948	1953	1961	1971	1981	1991	2001	2011
168	174	182	157	167	140	138	162	133	122	111	63	44	34	18	16

Note: In 1857 and 1869 contains data for former village Posert. In 1948 was named as Belaj-Posert.
