= Novaki Pazinski =

Novaki Pazinski Novacco di Pisino
- Village
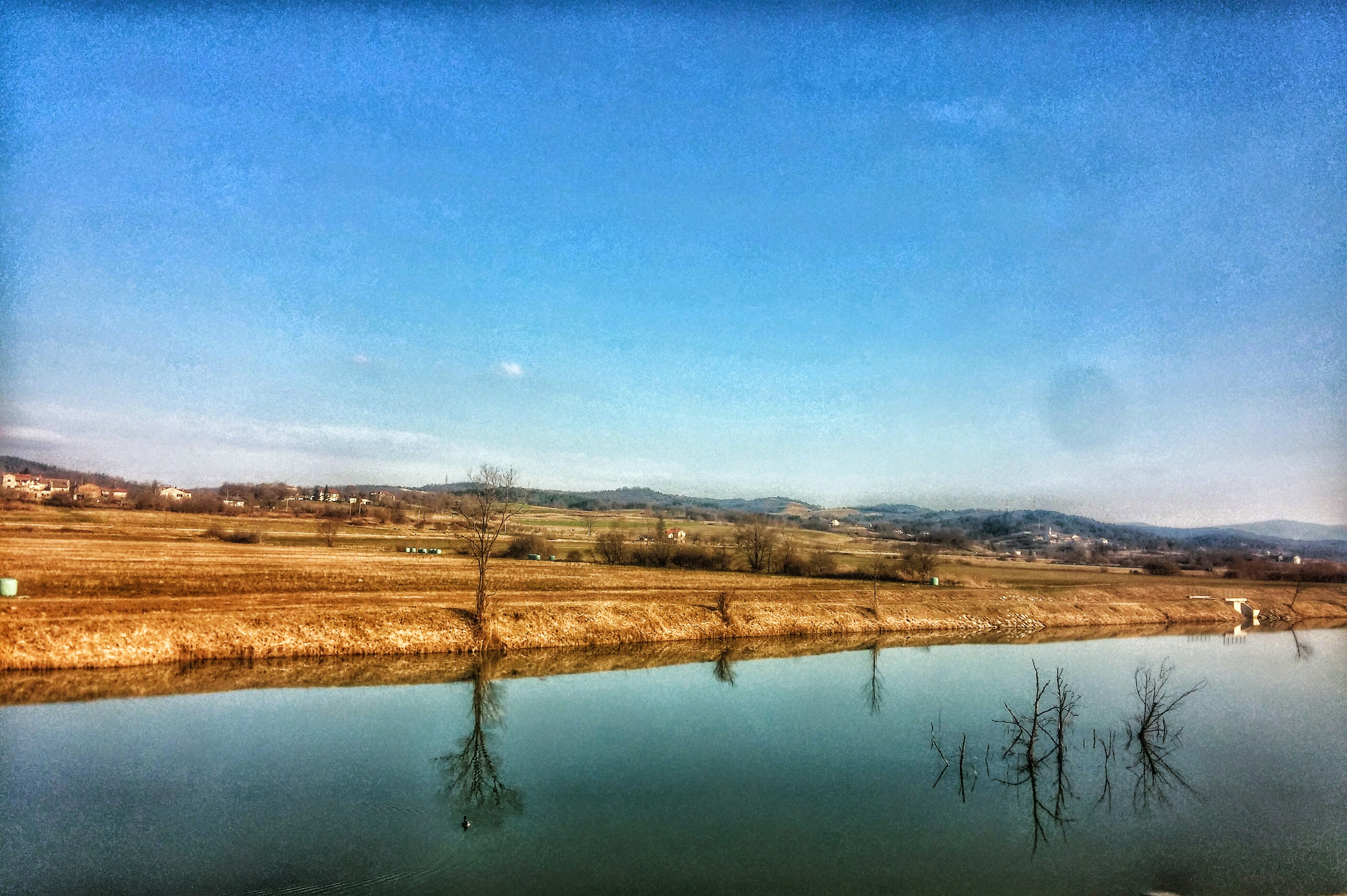

- Location within Croatia
- Coordinates: 45.2741186°N 13.9647207°E
- Country: Croatia
- County: Istria
- Municipality: Cerovlje

Area
  - Total: 3.5 sq mi (9.0 km^{2})

Population (2021)
  - Total: 181
  - Density: 52/sq mi (20/km^{2})
- Time zone: UTC+1 (CET)
  - Summer (DST): UTC+2 (CEST)
- Postal code: 52402 Cerovlje
- Area code: 052

Novaki Pazinski (Italian: Novacco di Pisino) is a village in Istria, Croatia.

== Demographics ==
According to the 2021 census, its population was 181.
