= Draguć =

Draguć Draguccio
- Village
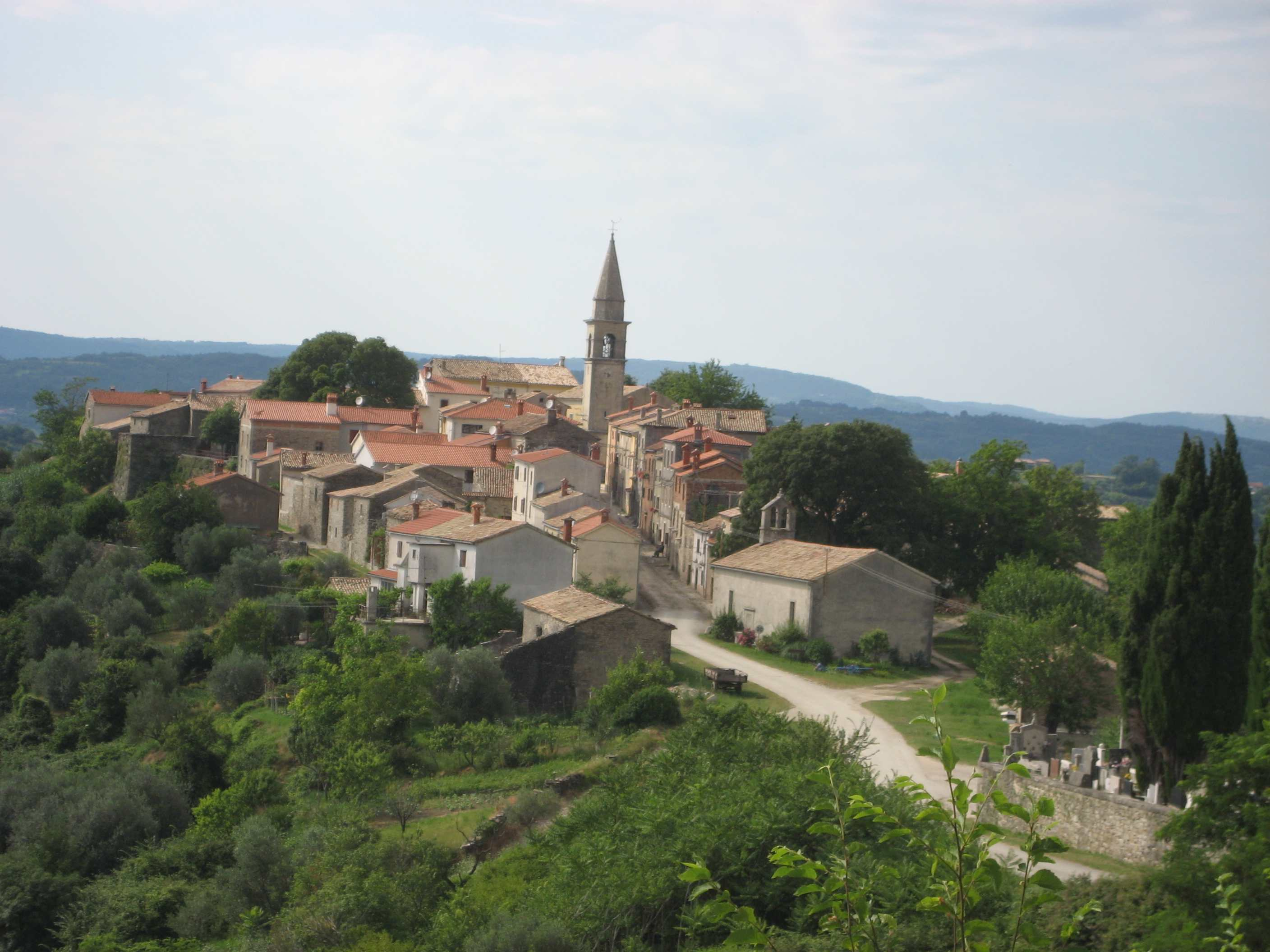

- Location within Croatia
- Coordinates: 45°19′N 14°00′E
- Country: Croatia
- County: Istria
- Municipality: Cerovlje

Area
  - Total: 2.7 sq mi (7.1 km^{2})

Population (2021)
  - Total: 56
  - Density: 20/sq mi (7.9/km^{2})
- Time zone: UTC+1 (CET)
  - Summer (DST): UTC+2 (CEST)
- Postal code: 52434 Cerovlje
- Area code: 052

Draguć (Italian: Draguccio) is a small fortified village in Croatia's Istria County. Today it pertains to the municipality of Cerovlje.

There are several churches: Sant' Eliseo from the 12th century (frescoes form the 13th century), Madonna del Rosario, built in 1641 and San Rocco e San Sebastiano, frescoes by Antonio da Padova in 1529.

World-known surgeon Antonio Grossich (1849–1926) who in 1908 invented the application of tincture of iodine as a way to treat the surgical field was born in Draguć.

== Demographics ==
According to the 2021 census, its population was 56.

Ethnic structure is marked with fluctuations in the 20th century, as indicated by languages spoken recorded in the Austrian and later census data.

Year	Population	(Serbo-)Croatian (%)	Italian (%)	Slovene (%)
1880	193	0	98.4	1.6
1890	189	7.4	91.0	1.6
1900	222	15.8	56.7	27.5
1910	249	80.7	18.9	0.4
1945	190	92.1	7.9	0
1991	70	95	5	0
2001	79	95	5	0

In 2004 La Femme Musketeer a made-for-television movie produced by Hallmark Entertainment and Larry Levinson Productions, was filmed in Draguć.
