= Gologorički Dol =

Gologorički Dol Valle di Moncalvo
- Village
- Location within Croatia
- Coordinates: 45.2449469°N 14.030761°E
- Country: Croatia
- County: Istria
- Municipality: Cerovlje

Area
  - Total: 1.4 sq mi (3.5 km^{2})

Population (2021)
  - Total: 64
  - Density: 47/sq mi (18/km^{2})
- Time zone: UTC+1 (CET)
  - Summer (DST): UTC+2 (CEST)
- Postal code: 52434 Cerovlje
- Area code: 052

Gologorički Dol (Italian: Valle di Moncalvo) is a village in Istria, Croatia.

== Demographics ==
According to the 2021 census, its population was 64.
