= Korelići =

Korelići Corelli
- Village
- Location within Croatia
- Coordinates: 45.3354661°N 13.9515268°E
- Country: Croatia
- County: Istria
- Municipality: Cerovlje

Area
  - Total: 2.1 sq mi (5.5 km^{2})

Population (2021)
  - Total: 46
  - Density: 22/sq mi (8.4/km^{2})
- Time zone: UTC+1 (CET)
  - Summer (DST): UTC+2 (CEST)
- Postal code: 52402 Cerovlje
- Area code: 052

Korelići (Italian: Corelli) is a village in Istria, Croatia.

== Demographics ==
According to the 2021 census, its population was 46.
