= Grimalda =

Ancient village in Croatia

- Village
- Location within Croatia
- Country: Croatia
- County: Istria
- Municipality: Cerovlje

Area
  - Total: 1.7 sq mi (4.3 km^{2})

Population (2021)
  - Total: 75
  - Density: 45/sq mi (17/km^{2})
- Time zone: UTC+1 (CET)
  - Summer (DST): UTC+2 (CEST)
- Postal code: 52402 Cerovlje
- Area code: 052

Grimalda is an ancient village or hamlet in Istria, Croatia, mentioned for the first time in 1202. It is located on a 447 meters hilltop. This place is also called Belvedere d'Istria because of the magnificent views.

== History ==
The name Grimalda is of Lombard origin (Grimoaldo), a Germanic tribe that dominated northern Italy from the 6th to 8th centuries. The Romanic Church of St. George situated on the graveyard was erected in 13th century and reconstructed during the Gothic period when pillars were added on its outside. Towards the end of the last century, in 1891, beside the old church, the new parish Church of St. George was built in Neoclassical style. The main square is still called with the German word 'Platz' by the inhabitants. The inhabitants are called 'Grimaldesi'.

The small church of St. George, it has been redecorated several times and, consequently, apart from the original Romanesque elements, it also has gothic supporting walls. Close to this small church is the bigger neoclassical church, also dedicated to St. George.

== Demographics ==
According to the 2021 census, its population was 75.

== See also ==
- List of Glagolitic inscriptions (16th century)
