= Cerovlje =

Cerovlje Cerreto d'Istria
- Municipality
- Cerovlje Municipality; Općina Cerovlje
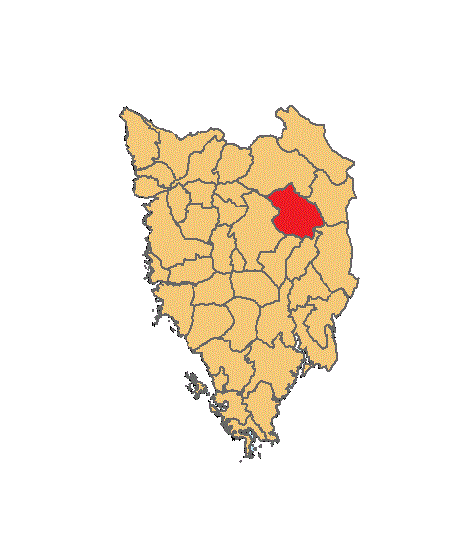
- Location of the municipality in Istria
- Interactive map of Cerovlje
- Location within Croatia
- Coordinates: 45°16′41″N 14°0′36″E
- Country: Croatia
- County: Istria County

Government
  - Municipal mayor: Elvis Šterpin (IDS)

Area
  - Municipality: 105.6 km^{2} (40.8 sq mi)
  - Urban: 5.3 km^{2} (2.0 sq mi)

Population (2021)
  - Municipality: 1,453
  - Density: 13.76/km^{2} (35.64/sq mi)
  - Urban: 197
  - Urban density: 37/km^{2} (96/sq mi)
- Time zone: UTC+1 (CET)
  - Summer (DST): UTC+2 (CEST)
- Postal code: 52000 Pazin
- Area code: 52
- Website: cerovlje.hr

Cerovlje (Italian: Cerreto) is a municipality and village in Istria, Croatia.

== Description ==
Many ancient towns and decayed castles (Belaj, Posert, Paz, Gologorica, Gradinje) can be found in its territory. Almost every town or castle in Cerovlje is on top of a hill, where they could see enemies from a further distance. During the Middle Ages (under the reign of the Holy Roman Empire), the people of Cerovlje also built many churches.

== Demographics ==
In 2021, the municipality had 1,453 residents in the following 15 settlements:

- Belaj, population 12
- Borut, population 180
- Cerovlje, population 197
- Ćusi, population 58
- Draguć, population 56
- Gologorica, population 237
- Gologorički Dol, population 64
- Gradinje, population 33
- Grimalda, population 75
- Korelići, population 46
- Novaki Pazinski, population 181
- Oslići, population 55
- Pagubice, population 120
- Paz, population 62
- Previž, population 77
Cerovlje: Population trends 1857–2021
v

population	3585	3707	3954	3993	4185	4378	4405	4780	3834	3607	3049	2485	2024	1815	1745	1677	1453
	1857	1869	1880	1890	1900	1910	1921	1931	1948	1953	1961	1971	1981	1991	2001	2011	2021

Note:Emerged from the old Pazin municipality. From 1857 until 1971 the population data include part of the data for Pazin. Sources: Croatian Bureau of Statistics publications

== See also ==
- List of Glagolitic inscriptions (16th century)
