= Mirasierra =

Coordinates: 40°29′30″N 3°42′29″W

- City neighborhood
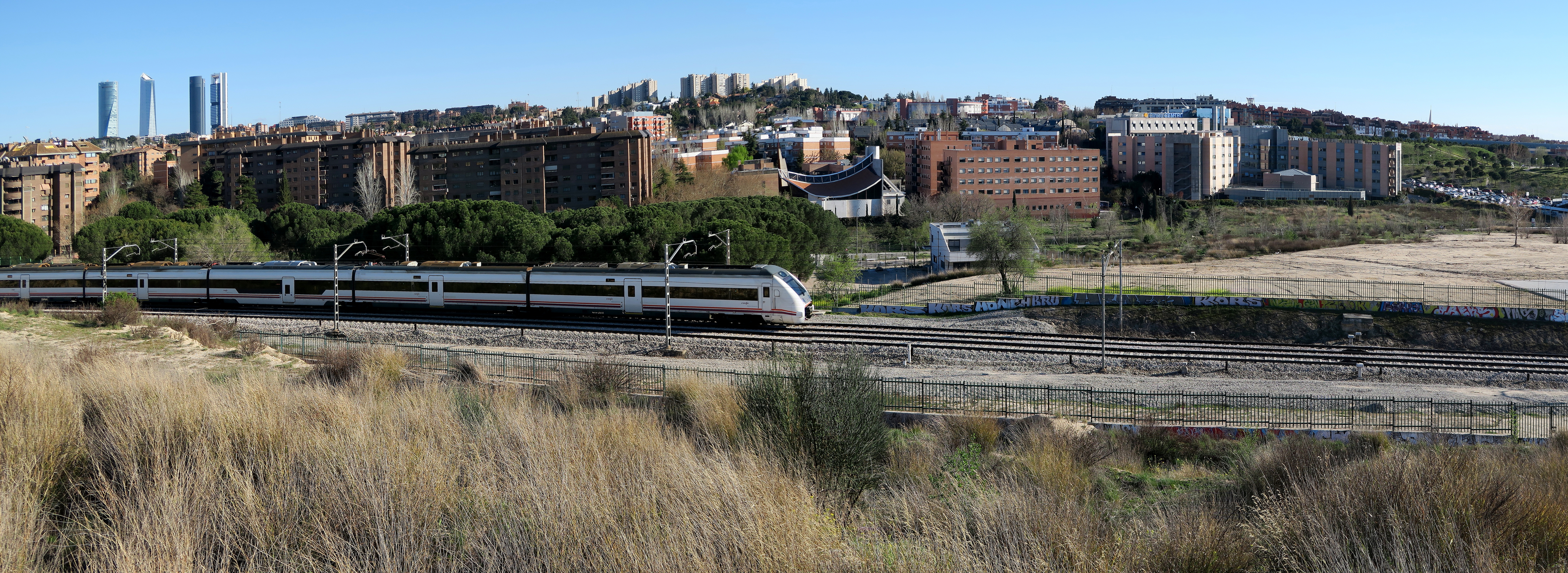
- Interactive map of Mirasierra
- Country: Spain
- Region: Community of Madrid
- Municipality: Madrid
- District: Fuencarral-El Pardo

Mirasierra ([ˌmi.ɾaˈsje.ra], "Mountain View") is an administrative neighborhood (barrio) of Madrid belonging to the district of Fuencarral-El Pardo. Mirasierra was founded in 1953.

The administrative area includes the southern most part of the new development of Montecarmelo.

== Public transport ==
=== Bus ===
Mirasierra is connected by a large bus network. The following lines give service to Mirasierra:

- Line 49: Plaza de Castilla - Pitis
- Line 133: Callao - Mirasierra
- Line 134: Plaza de Castilla - Montecarmelo
- Line 178: Plaza de Castilla - Montecarmelo
- Night bus line 23: Cibeles - Montecarmelo

=== Metro ===
The neighborhood is served by the lines 7 and 9:

- Line 7 has three stations: Lacoma, Arroyofresno and Pitis
- Line 9 has two stations: Mirasierra and Paco de Lucía

Also there is a nearby station in Montecarmelo neighborhood

=== Train ===
Mirasierra is served by the lines C-3a, C-7 and C-8 of Cercanias Madrid with two stations: Pitis (connection with line 7 of metro) and Mirasierra - Paco de Lucía (connection with line 9 of metro in Paco de Lucía station)
