= Pagubice =

Pagubice Pagobizze
- Village
- Location within Croatia
- Coordinates: 45.3027921°N 13.9697534°E
- Country: Croatia
- County: Istria
- Municipality: Cerovlje

Area
  - Total: 1.8 sq mi (4.7 km^{2})

Population (2021)
  - Total: 120
  - Density: 66/sq mi (26/km^{2})
- Time zone: UTC+1 (CET)
  - Summer (DST): UTC+2 (CEST)
- Postal code: 52402 Cerovlje
- Area code: 052

Pagubice (Italian: Pagobizze) is a village in Istria, Croatia.

== Demographics ==
According to the 2021 census, its population was 120.
