= Jaime Cárdenas Pardo =

Bolivian serial killer

- Born: Jaime Benjamín Cárdenas Pardo; 9 April 1987 (age 39); Santa Cruz de la Sierra, Bolivia
- Other names: "The Sucre Killer" "El J(h)immy"
- Conviction: Murder x5
- Penalty: Murder

Details
- Victims: 2 (convicted); 3 (confirmed); 30–45 (suspected)
- Span of crimes: 2006 – 2011 (possibly 2004 – 2011)
- Country: Bolivia
- States: Cochabamba, La Paz, Chuquisaca
- Date apprehended: For the final time on 3 May 2012
- Imprisoned at: Chonchocoro Prison, La Paz

Jaime Benjamín Cárdenas Pardo (born 9 April 1987), known as The Sucre Killer (Spanish: El asesino de Sucre), is a Bolivian serial killer. Conclusively linked to three murders between 2004 and 2011 across different cities, he is additionally suspected of committing between 30 to 45 murders in total which, if truthful, would make him the country's most prolific serial killer. Cárdenas has also been accused of at least four contract killings and various other violent crimes, but was never convicted.

Originally convicted for the murders of two women in 2011, Cárdenas escaped from prison a year later and was recaptured after more than a month. He is currently incarcerated, serving a 30-year prison sentence.

== Early life and crimes ==
Cárdenas Pardo was born on 9 April 1987 in the city of Santa Cruz de la Sierra to a divorced couple who had a total of eight other children, but nonetheless grew up in a peaceful household. According to his own claims, Cárdenas started committing crimes in his early teenage years after meeting some gang members at night school, with whom he started stealing cell phones and wallets to buy alcohol and use drugs. Reportedly, his very first crime occurred at age 14, when he robbed a drunk man to buy alcohol, after which he moved onto stealing cards and motorcycles. When asked about why, he claimed that it was initially to get attention from his family, but then his addictions to marijuana and flunitrazepam, as well as his impulsivety, led him to start committing violent crimes.

At some point during his life, Cárdenas fathered a son, but virtually nothing is known about the mother of his child. Cárdenas also claimed that, despite being a self-identified Catholic, he also practised Satanic rituals.

== Murders ==
Cárdenas claimed that his first murder occurred in his teens, and that he was first arrested for a robbery-homicide in Cochabamba at age 17, but was released after he lied about his age. Following this, he moved back to Santa Cruz Department, where he stabbed several people in fights and murdered at least 15 others in robberies over the following years. He has never been prosecuted for these alleged crimes, which he attributed to either bribing police officials or even their direct participation in some of the crimes. Whether these claims are true or not is unknown.

His most notorious crime occurred in Sucre on 11 October 2010, when he murdered 21-year-old María Delgado Rosso and 20-year-old Nairobi Alexis Muñoz Siles, who were beaten to death and their bodies in an open area of La Calancha. The victims were medical students from the University of San Francisco Xavier, and were killed with the help of police officer Ever Albis Vera. Cárdenas later claimed that on the day of the murders, the four of them were drinking alcohol when he suddenly attacked and sexually assaulted the two women before stabbing them to death, disposing of their remains with Albis' help.

Cárdenas later claimed that a boyfriend of one of the victims hired hitmen to kill him, but when they failed to locate him, they instead stabbed his son to death in August 2011. This act further enraged Cárdenas, who claimed that he proceeded to commit at least 15 additional murders until the end of the year - thirteen in Santa Cruz, three in Sucre, and two in Cochabamba.

== Arrest, trial, and imprisonment ==
Shortly after the Delgado–Muñoz murders, Albis was arrested and implicated Cárdenas as the primary killer. However, he was only captured on 18 February 2011 after he attempted to stab Peruvian citizen Zarael Cotrina Burgoa during a failed robbery. Cárdenas was then taken to the maximum-security Chonchocoro Prison, where he readily confessed to all of his crimes, stating that he was tired of leaving a life of crime. While he was not charged for a majority of his violent crimes, he was positively linked to several of them, including a fatal 2006 robbery-murder in La Paz, where he killed a man named Wilfredo Quiroz Sánchez while attempting to steal a computer. At the time, he was positively identified as the killer by the victim's wife and another separate witness, but was released for undisclosed reasons.

Throughout the trial, Cárdenas showed apparent remorse for the crimes and said that he understood why the victims' family wanted him dead. At one point during his testimony, he claimed that had attempted suicide twice while in pretrial detention and even expressed his wish for the death penalty to be legal so he can executed. Due to the overwhelming amount of evidence against him and his own admissions, Cárdenas was convicted of the murders on 6 December 2011 and sentenced to 30 years imprisonment. For his role in the Delgado–Muñoz murders, Albis was also sentenced to 30 years imprisonment.

=== Prison escape, interviews, and life in prison ===
Throughout his imprisonment, Cárdenas gained notoriety for the numerous interviews he gave to media outlets in which he described his life and the numerous crimes he had committed.

On 30 March 2012, Cárdenas escaped from the San Roque Prison by pretending that he had to go the bathroom, then scaling a three-meter wall and hiding himself in a gray station wagon. An intensive manhunt ensued to apprehend him, as it was feared that he might retaliate against the prosecutor who handled his case due to the numerous death threats he leveled at them during the trial. After 34 days, Cárdenas was captured on 3 May at a carpentry shop in Yucumo, which some media outlets allege belonged to family members.

Following his recapture, Cárdenas was transferred to the maximum-security Chonchocoro Prison, where he continues to serve his sentence. In 2021, he gave another interview to the media in which he described his daily routine inside the prison and his conversion to Evangelicalism, stating that he had repented and wanted to become a pastor with his own congregation. In said interview, Cárdenas claimed that he felt remorse and was "tormented by demons" during his incarceration, but was no longer bothered with the fact that people kept asking him about his past. He also stated that he had planned to marry a female rapper named "Yasel", had a young daughter and hoped to have another son, and if released, he would devote himself to preaching and even making music.

== See also ==
- List of serial killers by country
