= El Goloso =

Coordinates: 40°33′22″N 3°42′12″W

- City neighborhood
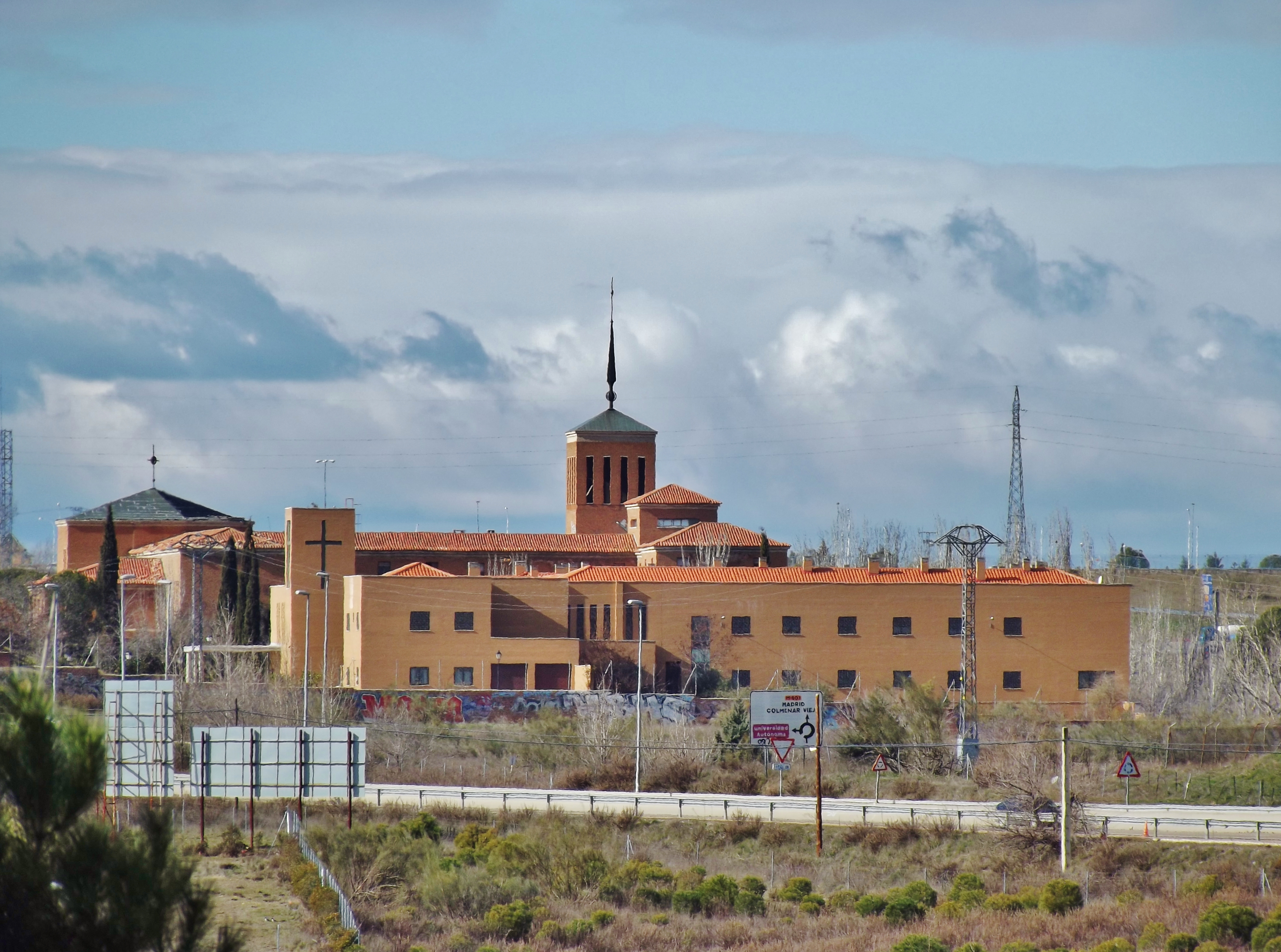
- Interactive map of El Goloso
- Country: Spain
- Region: Community of Madrid
- Municipality: Madrid
- District: Fuencarral-El Pardo

El Goloso is an administrative neighborhood (barrio) of Madrid belonging to the district of Fuencarral-El Pardo.

Much of the administrative area lies along the M-607 Colmenar Viejo Road South of Tres Cantos and west of Alcobendas, though it also includes most of the recently built Montecarmelo residential area.

On August 20, 1943, the Armoured Division No. 1 "Brunete" was established at the El Goloso Camp under the command of Major-General Ricardo Rada Peral.
