= Paz, Croatia =

Paz
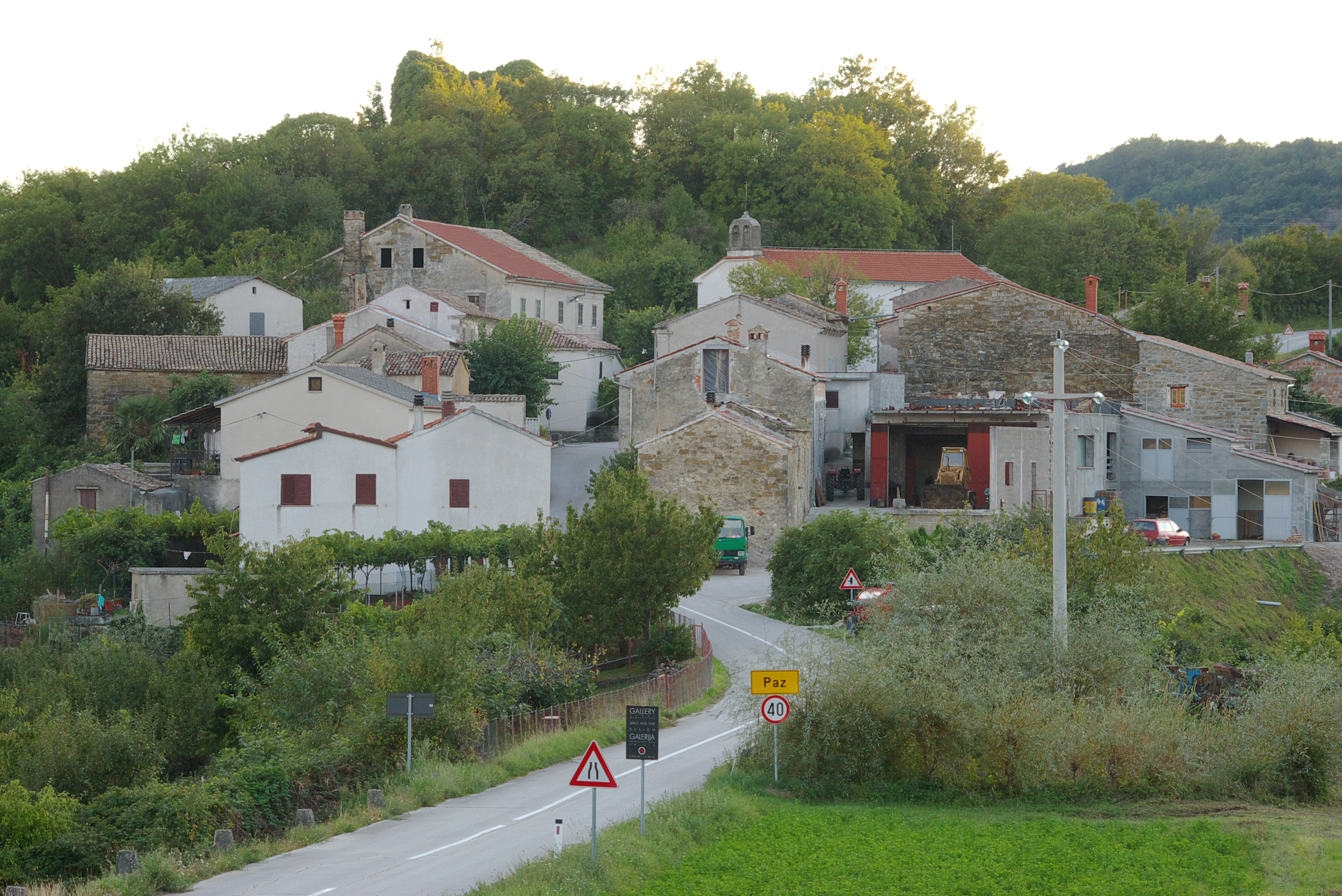

- Location within Croatia
- Coordinates: 45°17′29″N 14°05′38″E
- Country: Croatia
- County: Istria
- Municipality: Cerovlje

Area
  - Total: 5.0 sq mi (12.9 km^{2})

Population (2021)
  - Total: 62
  - Density: 12/sq mi (4.8/km^{2})
- Time zone: UTC+1 (CET)
  - Summer (DST): UTC+2 (CEST)
- Postal code: 52434 Cerovlje
- Area code: 052

Paz is a village and ruined castle in Istria County, Croatia, in the municipality of Cerovlje. In 2011, the population of the village was 72.

== Description ==
It is in the north-eastern part of Istria, north-east of the Gologorica and Gradinje, north of Belaj and Posert castles, south-west of Boljun, and 9 kilometres (6 mi) north-east from the municipality center Cerovlje. It is near the old road which connects Istria with Kastav.

== Castle history ==
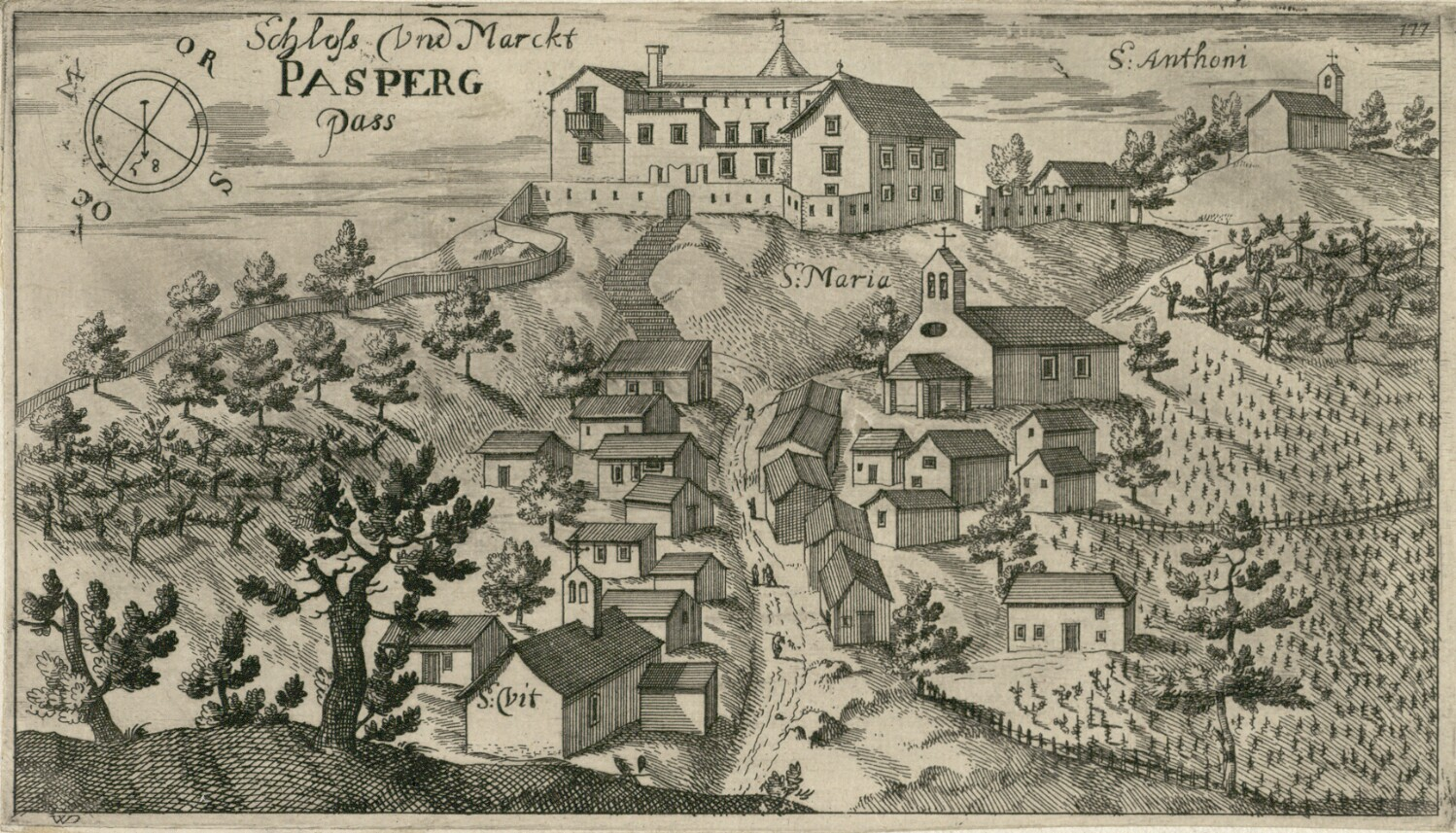
Paz in an engraving from 1679.

It is an old settlement above the old road which in the past was the shortest way through the valley between the Boljunčica and Pazinčica rivers. In 1785 in honor of Joseph II the road Jozefina was built, connecting Učka-Vranja-Boljun-Paz-Pazin. The settlement was first mentioned in the 12th century as part of Aquileia church estates, as Paas, later as Pasperc, Pasberk or Passberg. In the 17th century, Italian writer and geographer Fortunato Olmo mentioned it as Villa del Cane. At the time of its first mention Paz was part of the Boljun manor estate, until around 1290s when Friedrich Eberstein received the village Paz as feud from the Aquileia patriarch Raimondo della Torre, and started to build a fortress. It was in Eberstein family property until 1374, because of not having an heir, and became part of Habsburgs Pazin principality. The castle was managed by Walderstein family who also upgraded it. At the time of War of the League of Cambrai, in 1508 was conquered and burned by Venice. The next year the castle was captured by Austrian general Krsto Frankopan, and it was inherited by his daughter Barbara married Bernardin Barbo from Kožljak castle. After her death in 1570 was inherited by the son Messaldo Barbo who the old Gothic fort renovated into Renaissance fortified residence, as evidenced by the inscription at the entrance of the castle. The Barbo family, especially in Kožljak castle, supported Protestantism, however, Messaldo was such an ardent supporter of Reformation that in 1574 at Vrhnika he murdered his own son Kastelano because he did not want to abandon the Roman Catholic faith. For that crime Messaldo was executed in 1589 in Ljubljana. It was in possession of his heirs until 1665 when was bought by Auersperg noble family, and in the 18th century was abandoned, becoming only the ruins.

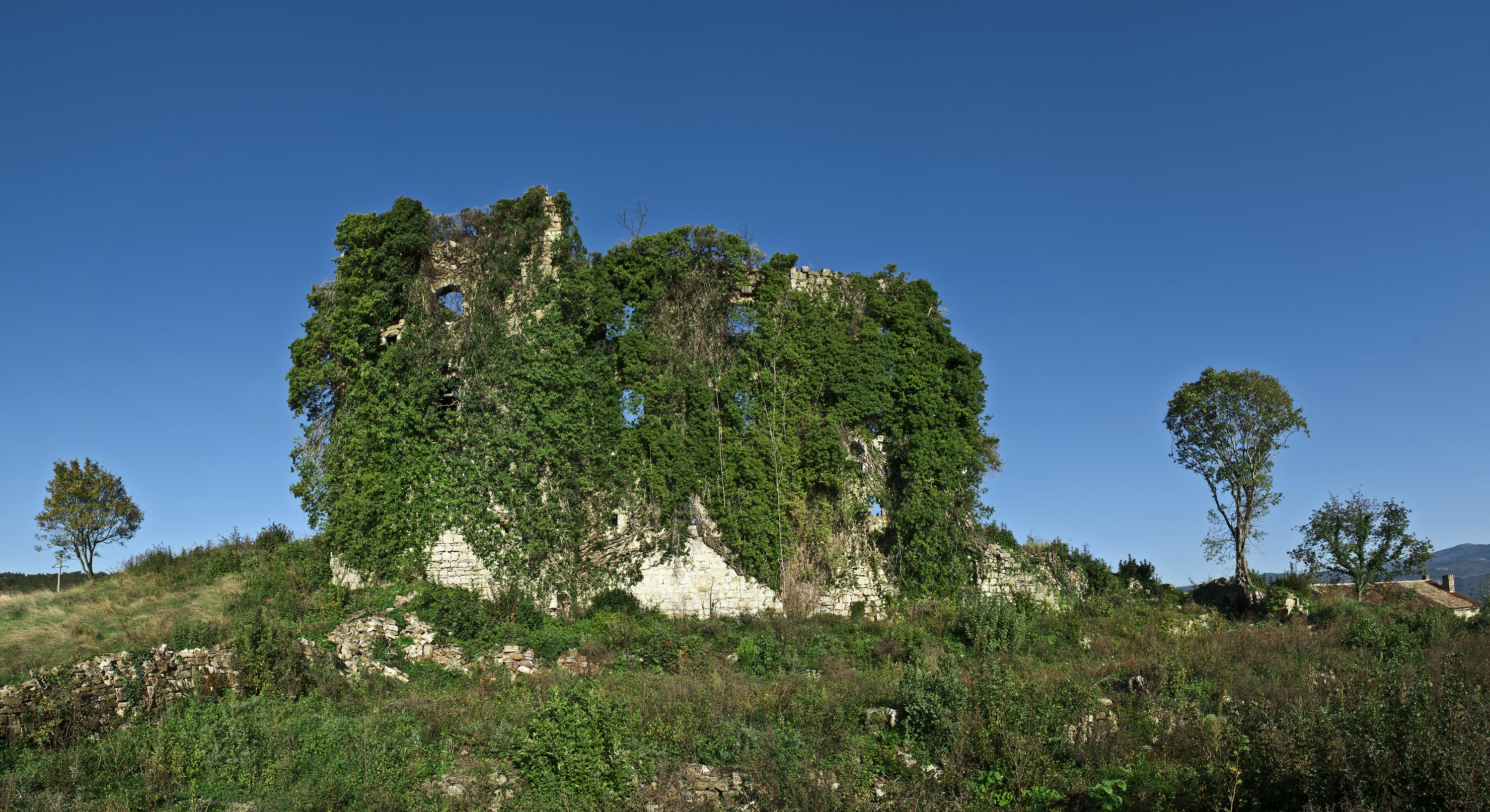
Ruins of Paz Castle in 2013.

Of the former fortified residence today are preserved only modest remains on the edge of the village. Ruins fully cover the long, narrow elongated plateau from west to east, which is with the steep slopes to the west and east separated from the adjacent slopes. It was a great defense and residential complex consisting of a strong fortified core and outside the fortified court on the west and east sides. Like some of the neighboring castle core is smaller trapezoid layout fort, built on the highest point above the village, 30 m long and 19 m wide. On the west side, where access to the fort is easiest, was in one corner strong rectangular tower, while the defensive wall was further defended with two smaller buildings of rectangular layout, situated along the external facade. Of the palace are preserved only one large room on the inside of the western defensive wall, next to the angular tower and a modest remains of other buildings in the southeastern part. Thanks to Valvasor engraving from 1679, it was a large residence with three two-storey wings that are surrounding a small inner courtyard, and to the west side of the one-storey wing was leaning on the walls. On the eastern side access to the center of the fort further defended external established garden, from which today only are preserved fragment of the south wall with loopholes.

At the western end of the village is the Baroque parish church of the Assumption of the Blessed Virgin Mary from 1579. Of the former late Gothic church are preserved only custody of Baltazar Walderstein from 1496, with two coats of arms decorated with tombstones from 1636 to 1700. At the eastern entrance to the village, on top of a hill, is the cemetery church of St. Vid with partially preserved wall paintings from 1461 by master Albert from Konstanz, and on the southern wall decorated with family coats of arms from 1570, and the sarcophagus of Barbara Walderstein, mother Messaldo Barbo.

== Demographics ==
According to the 2021 census, its population was 62. It was 72 in 2011.

Population number according to the census
1857	1869	1880	1890	1900	1910	1921	1931	1948	1953	1961	1971	1981	1991	2001	2011	2021
415	429	421	412	386	387	376	363	292	255	182	153	127	99	79	72	62

Note: In 1857 and 1869 contains data for former village Posert. In 1948 was named as Belaj-Posert.
