= Ćusi =

Ćusi Zusi
- Village
- Location within Croatia
- Coordinates: 45.2571632°N 13.9824384°E
- Country: Croatia
- County: Istria
- Municipality: Cerovlje

Area
  - Total: 2.0 sq mi (5.2 km^{2})

Population (2021)
  - Total: 58
  - Density: 29/sq mi (11/km^{2})
- Time zone: UTC+1 (CET)
  - Summer (DST): UTC+2 (CEST)
- Postal code: 52434 Cerovlje
- Area code: 052

Ćusi (Italian: Zusi) is a village in Istria, Croatia.

== Demographics ==
According to the 2021 census, its population was 58.

== See also ==
- List of Glagolitic inscriptions (16th century)
