= Posert Castle =

Croatian ruin

Coordinates: 45°16′25.6″N 14°6′12.6″E

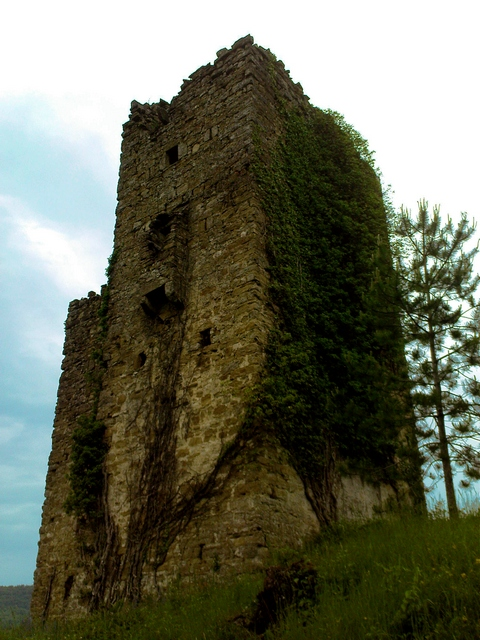
Renovated Possert Renovated Possert 2024 Ruins of Posert Castle

Posert Castle (Posrt, Italian: Possert), also known as Šabec (Schabez) and St. Martin, is a ruined fortress near the road between Paz and Šušnjevica, in municipality of Cerovlje, in Istria, Croatia. The ruins of the castle depending on the name are dating back to the 11th century (St. Martin), or 16th century (Šabec), while by archeological evidence to the second half of the 14th century. The castle was vastly devastated in the Uskok War (1615–17). Between 2009 and 2014 the castle was restored. Nearby the castle there is also a small Church of St. Martin from 1367.

== History ==
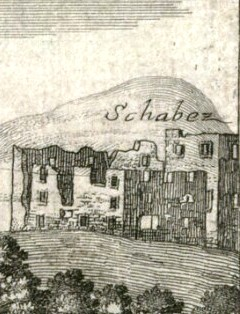
Posert Castle (Schabez) viewed from the southeast side, 1679

Until now the castle was considered as the same fortress with different names, of St. Martin, Posert and Šabec, which in several occasions were separately mentioned and built, but that wasn't confirmed by archaeological research. It is still unknown whether they were at the same or different locations.

The castle was associated with Castrum Sancti Martini from the 11th century, mentioned in the grant by Ulric II to Aquileia patriarchs. In the second half of 14th century St. Martin belonged to the Pazin county. Its lords were Gutenegg family, and when in 1436 became part of the Moysevich (Moise, Mojsijević) family estate, that area was named Posshart, while suburb as Possert.

In the 16th century, Juraj (or Giorgio) Barbo, of the Barbo family who inherited Moysevich estate and Kožljak in 1529, allegedly built new fortress Šabec. Between 1614 and 1617, during the Venice-Uskok war, both St. Martin (or Possert) and Šabec area were occupied and destroyed. As Šabec was in ruins and abandoned, Juraj decided to build a new castle Belaj south of it.

According to archeological excavations the castle is dated to the second half of the 14th century. This indicates that the castle was possibly built by Counts of Gorizia who were the lords of the area until 1374, or by the Habsburg family who inherited their estates.

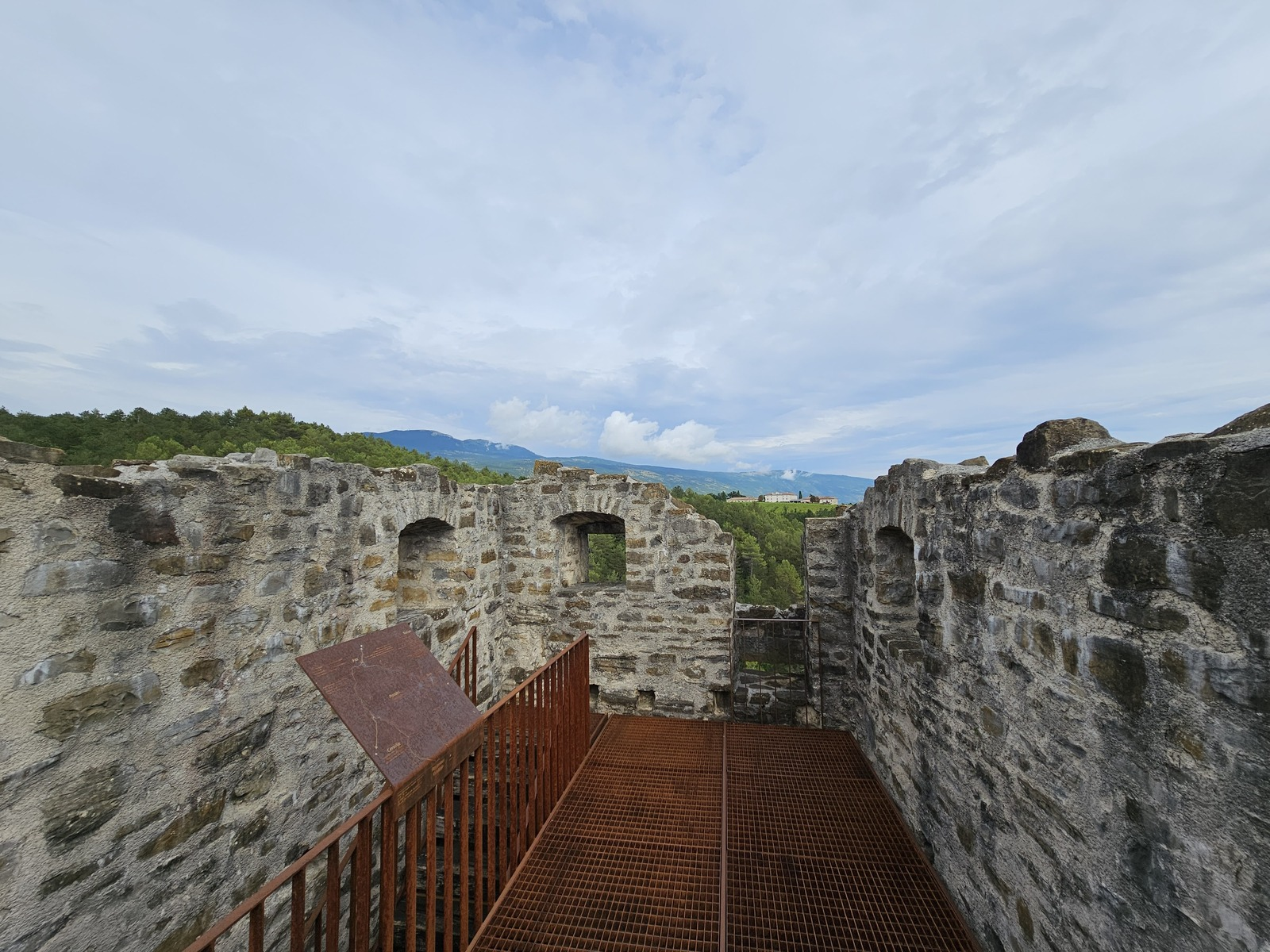
Viewpoint from Possert Tower

== Description ==
The castle is of irregular trapezoidal layout with rectangular angle tower. The layout broad side is faced toward north. It consists of center in the northern part, and of external fortified yard in the central and southern part. The guard tower is best preserved. It had five floors, preserved to a height of 17 metres (56 ft) with irregular layout, 8 metres (26 ft) long by 6 metres (20 ft) wide.
