= Previž =

Previž Previso
- Village
- Location within Croatia
- Coordinates: 45.2971745°N 14.001586°E
- Country: Croatia
- County: Istria
- Municipality: Cerovlje

Area
  - Total: 2.7 sq mi (7.0 km^{2})

Population (2021)
  - Total: 77
  - Density: 28/sq mi (11/km^{2})
- Time zone: UTC+1 (CET)
  - Summer (DST): UTC+2 (CEST)
- Postal code: 52402 Cerovlje
- Area code: 052

Previž (Italian: Previso) is a village in Istria, Croatia.

== Demographics ==
According to the 2021 census, its population was 77.
