= Fuencarral-El Pardo =

Coordinates: 40°28′43″N 3°42′35″W

- District of Madrid
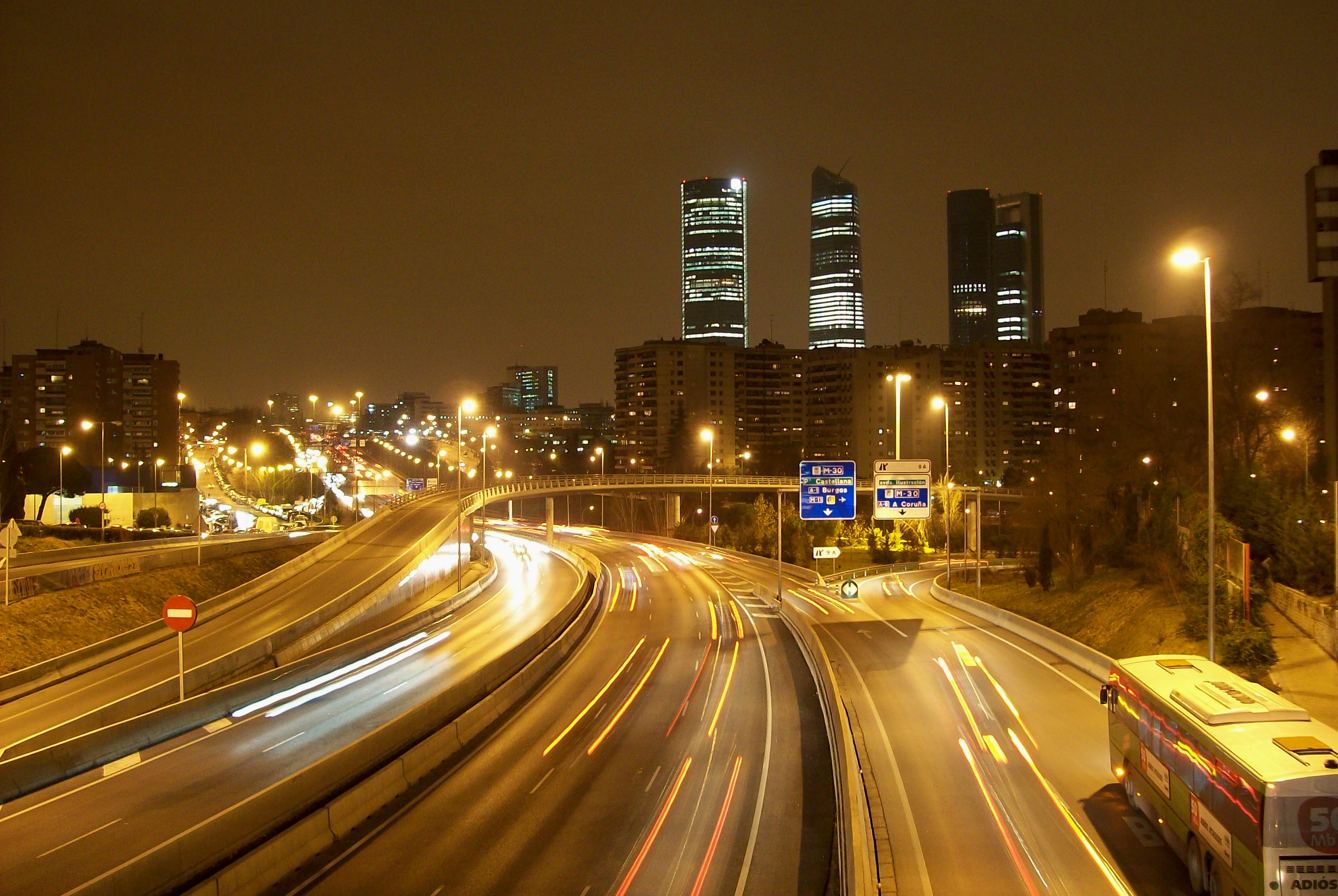
- M-30 ring highway over the district

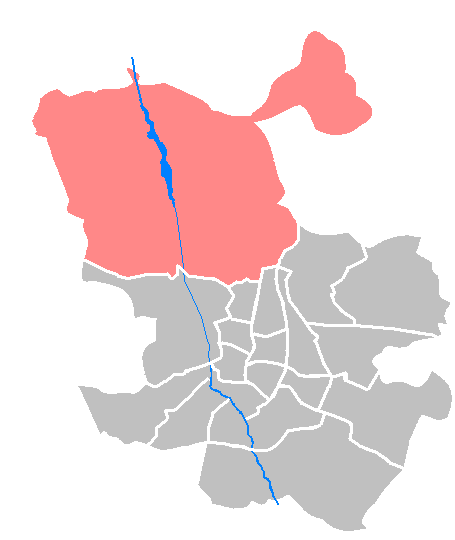
- Interactive map of Fuencarral-El Pardo
- Country: Spain
- Aut. community: Madrid
- Municipality: Madrid

Government
  - Councillor-President: José Antonio Martínez Páramo (PP, 2023)

Area
  - Total: 237.81 km^{2} (91.82 sq mi)

Population
  - Total: 220,085
  - Density: 925.5/km^{2} (2,397/sq mi)
- Postal code: 28032
- Madrid district number: 8

Fuencarral-El Pardo (Spanish pronunciation: [fweŋkaˈral el ˈpaɾðo]) is one of the 21 districts that form the city of Madrid, Spain.

== Overview ==
Fuencarral-El Pardo is the district number 8 and consists of the following neighborhoods: El Pardo (81), Fuentelarreina (82), Peñagrande (83), Pilar (84), La Paz (85), Valverde (86), Mirasierra (87) and El Goloso (88).

Despite its being a part of a capital city, El Pardo with its woods and river is an ecologically important landscape. It enjoyed protection from development as a hunting estate associated with the Royal Palace of El Pardo. In the 1980s the European Union designated the Monte de El Pardo as a Special Protection Area for bird-life.

== Geography ==
=== Subdivision ===
The district is administratively divided into 8 wards (Barrios):

- Barrio del Pilar
- El Goloso
- El Pardo
- Fuentelarreina
- La Paz
- Mirasierra
- Peñagrande
- Valverde

== Education ==
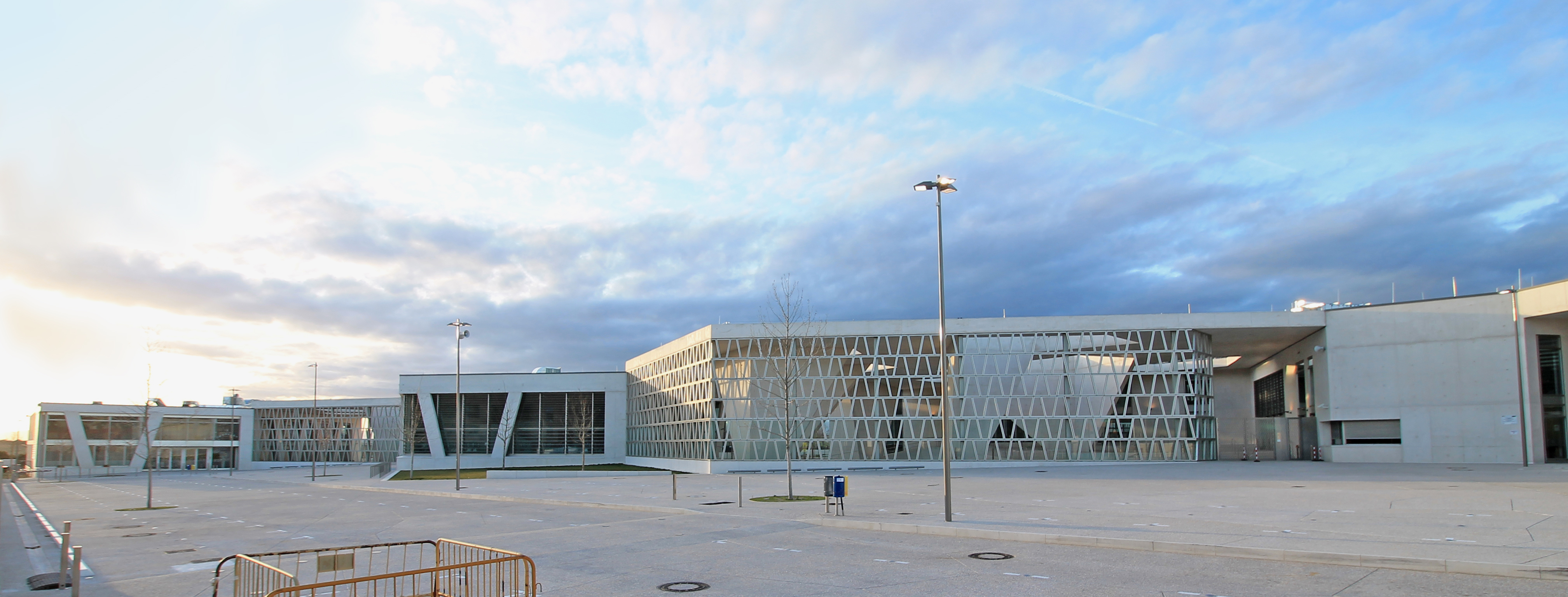
Deutsche Schule Madrid

The new campus of the Deutsche Schule Madrid, in Montecarmelo (ES) in the district, opened in the fall of 2015.

== See also ==
- Fuencarral
- Royal Palace of El Pardo
