= La Paz Municipality =

La Paz Municipality may refer to:

- La Paz Municipality, Bolivia
- La Paz Municipality, Baja California Sur
