= Rodrigo Paz (disambiguation) =

Rodrigo Paz (born 1967) is a Bolivian politician and president of Bolivia.

Rodrigo Paz may also refer to:

- Rodrigo Paz Delgado (1933–2021), Ecuadorian politician and businessman, presidential candidate in 1996

- Estadio Rodrigo Paz Delgado, sports stadium in Quito

- Rodrigo Paz, rower who represented Chile at the 2025 Junior Pan American Games
