= La Paz (Madrid) =

Coordinates: 40°28′53″N 3°41′49″W

- City neighborhood
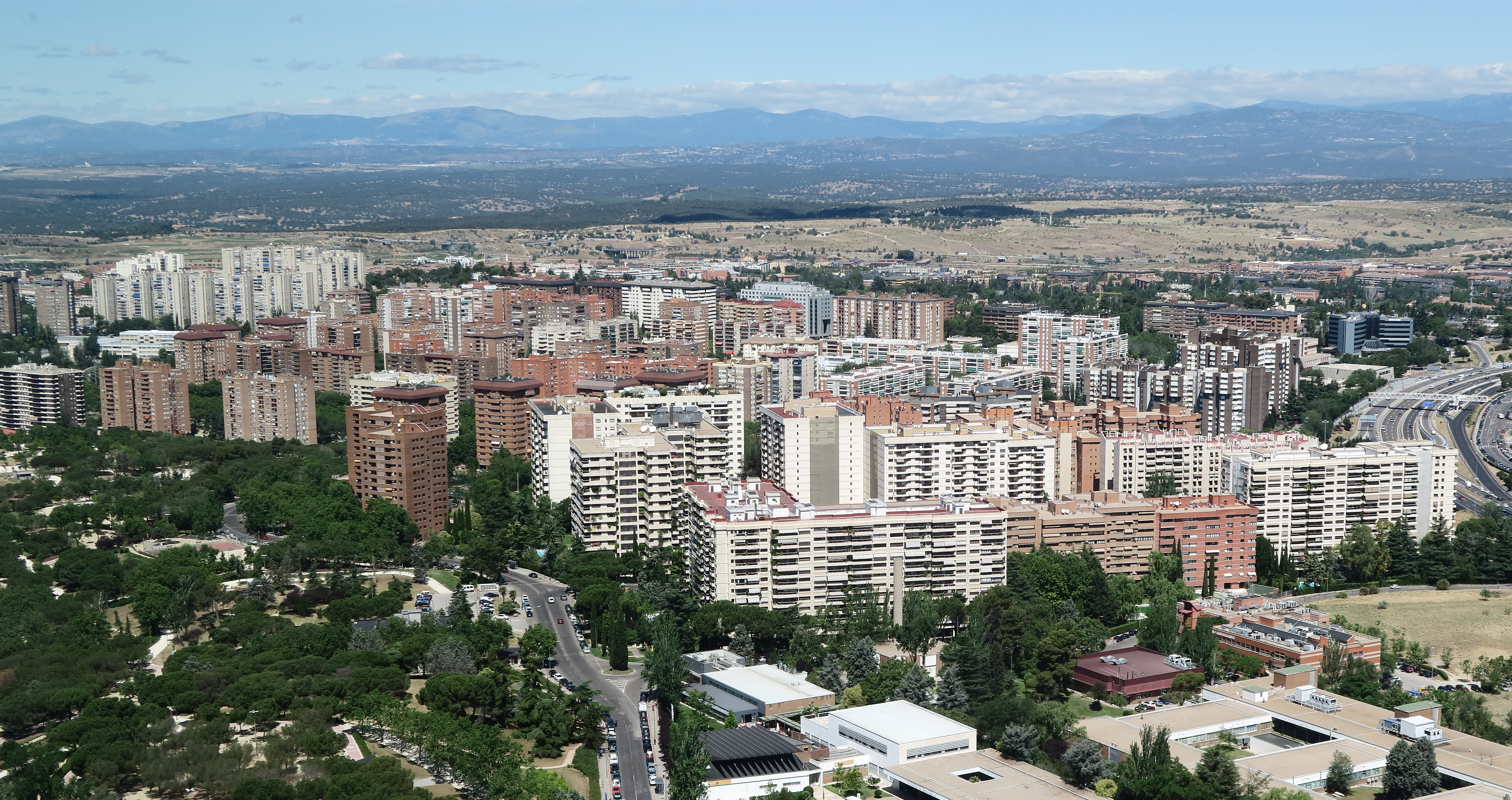
- Interactive map of La Paz
- Country: Spain
- Region: Community of Madrid
- Municipality: Madrid
- District: Fuencarral-El Pardo

La Paz is an administrative neighborhood (barrio) of Madrid belonging to the district of Fuencarral-El Pardo. It is home to the largest hospital in Madrid, Hospital Universitario La Paz.
