= La Paz Department =

La Paz Department may refer to:

- La Paz Department, Catamarca, Argentina
- La Paz Department, Entre Ríos, Argentina
- La Paz Department, Mendoza, Argentina
- La Paz Department (Bolivia)
- La Paz Department (El Salvador)
- La Paz Department (Honduras)

== See also ==
- La Paz (disambiguation)
