= Gologorica =

Gologorica Moncalvo di Pisino Golgorizza
- Village
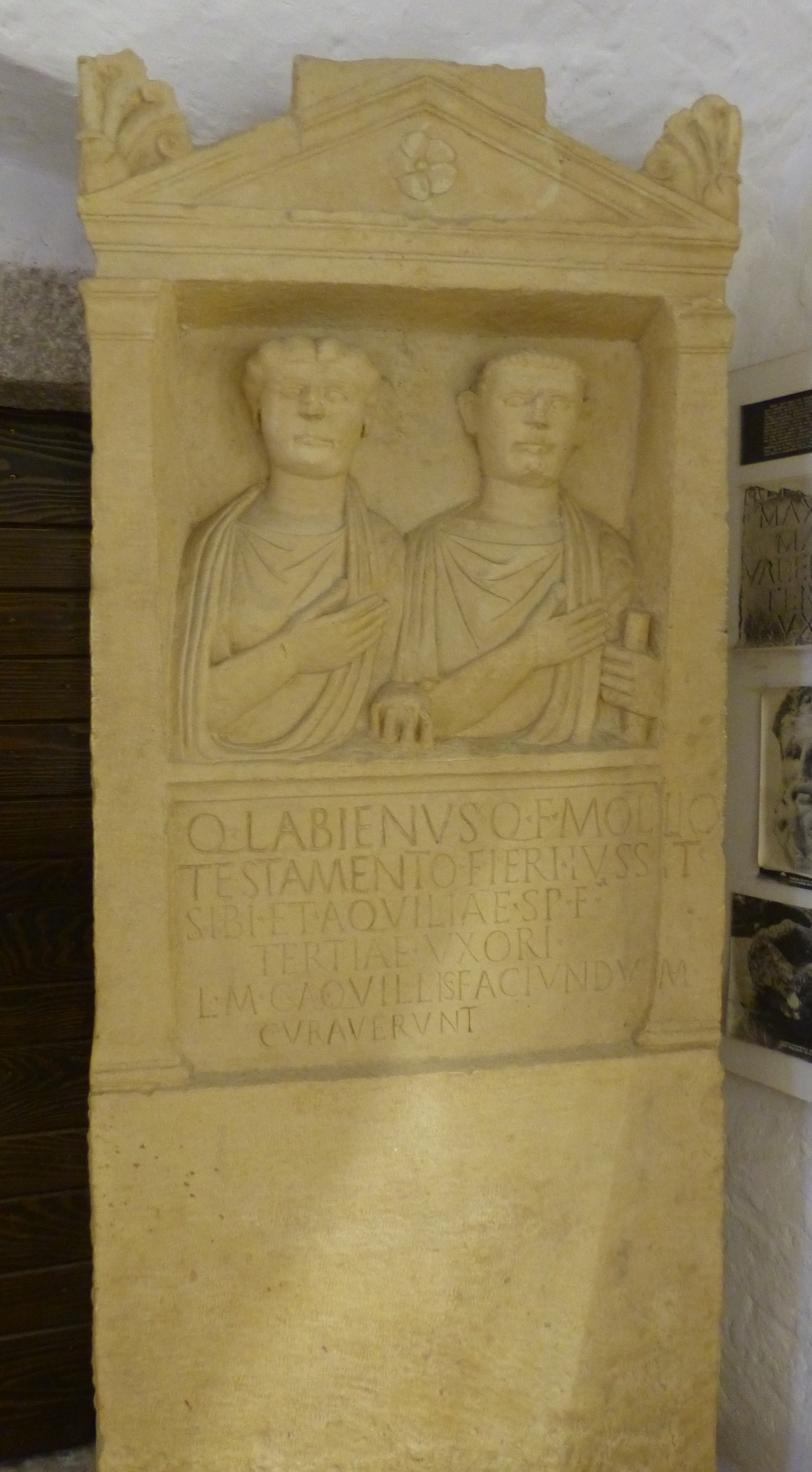
- Roman gravestone discovered in Moncalvo di Pisino (Golgorica), now at the Pazin Museum

- Location within Croatia
- Country: Croatia
- County: Istria
- Municipality: Cerovlje

Area
  - Total: 4.2 sq mi (10.9 km^{2})

Population (2021)
  - Total: 237
  - Density: 56.3/sq mi (21.7/km^{2})
- Time zone: UTC+1 (CET)
  - Summer (DST): UTC+2 (CEST)
- Postal code: 52434 Cerovlje
- Area code: 052

Gologorica, historically known as Moncalvo di Pisino (Italian: Moncalvo di Pisino; Golgorizza), is a village in central Istria, near Pazin (Pisino).

Today the village is part of the municipality of Cerovlje.

== History ==
The area of Pisino was inhabited since ancient times. The burg around the Castle Montecuccoli (Pazin Castle) was inhabited since prehistoric times, as were many other settlements in the area, including the Bertossi castellieri, Glavizza, and Vermo, which features a necropolis dating from the 7th to 5th century BC. Some of these settlements became urban centers, others became burgs of castles, and others still remained villages. All the villages in the Pisino area enjoyed in Medieval times a degree of relative autonomy. The presence of such municipal organization in central Istria "demonstrates the persistence of prerogatives linked to the ancient Roman municipalities". Important Roman artifacts were discovered in the Pisino area, including a Roman gravestone discovered in Moncalvo di Pisino.

Remarkable sights in the town include the church of St. Peter and Paul the Apostle with three beautiful Renaissance altars and a painted baptismal font from the 17th century. This church contains artworks from the 15th century and a Baroque altar. There is the small church of the Blessed Virgin Mary, located on the hilltop on the right side, at the entrance of the settlement, dating from the Romanesque period. It features frescoes by an unknown author, dating from 1400. Finally, there are the remains of the city walls.

On the main square, in front of the parish church, there is the house of the De Franceschi family, built in 1711.

The village also features a stone inscription dedicated to the alleged local Mikula Gologoricki, mentioned in the 13th-century document Istrian Demarcation.

== Demographics ==
According to the 2021 census, its population was 237. In the 2011 census, it had 269 inhabitants.

=== Notable people ===
- Carlo De Franceschi (1809–1893), Italian historian and politician
