= Montecarmelo =

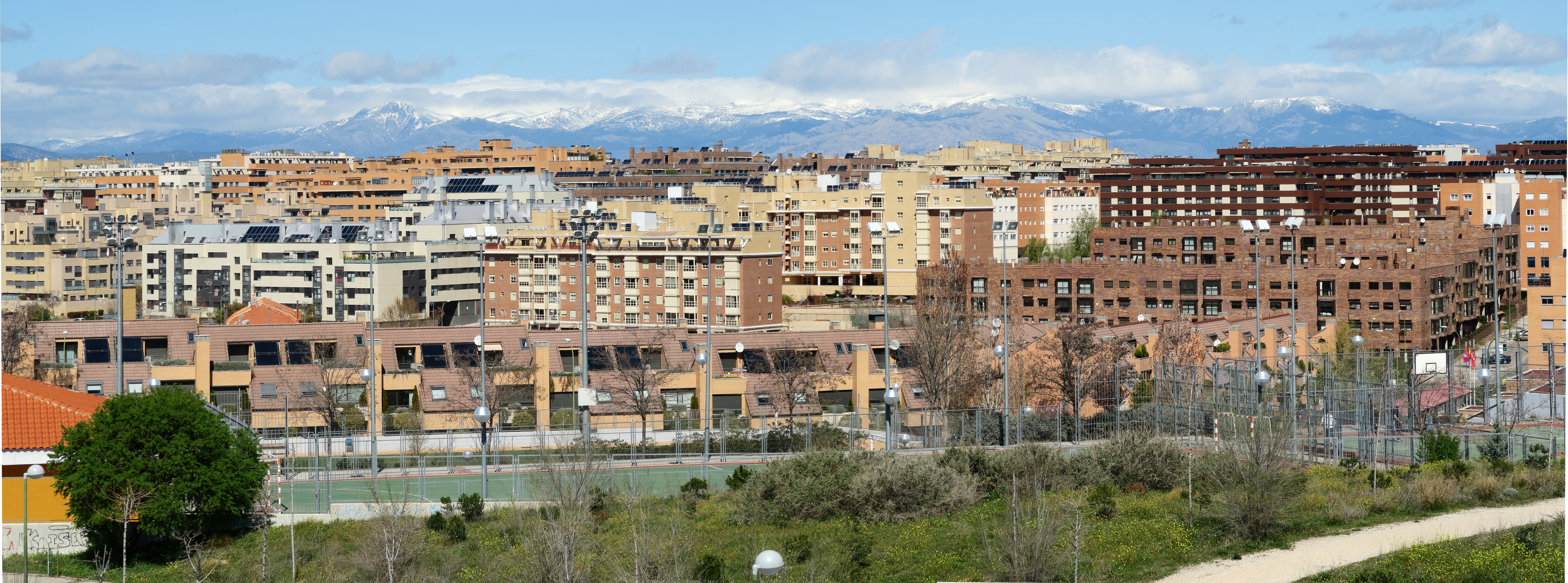
Montecarmelo (2016)

Montecarmelo is a residential area in the northwest of the city of Madrid, Spain, with a population over 20,000.

Administratively it is divided divided between the neighbourhoods of El Goloso and Mirasierra, both in the Fuencarral-El Pardo district of Madrid.

The area has an elongated, kidney-shaped form, with longitudinal avenues and transverse streets named after different monasteries in Spain.

It is bordered to the north and west by the intersection of the M-40 ring road, to the east by the M-607 road (the rest of the El Goloso neighbourhood is located on the other side of the Colmenar Viejo road), and is separated to the south from the rest of the Mirasierra neighborhood by railway tracks.

== History ==
The area emerged as an Urban Development Programme (PAU) following the development of the 1997 General Urban Development Plan for the Municipality of Madrid. The first homes were completed in 2002-2003.

== Name ==
The name of this area derives from a nearby stream named after Mount Carmel, originating near the hermitage of Nuestra Señora de Valverde in the north-east of the area which joins other streams and the Arroyo del Fresno, before emptying into the Manzanares.

== Transport ==
In addition to Madrid buses, Montecarmelo is served by the Montecarmelo (Madrid Metro) metro station on line 10 in the centre of the area, and on its boundaries by the Tres Olivos station (also line 10) and Mirasierra - Paco de Lucía station (line 9 and Cercanías Madrid railway).
