= Pietro Kandler =

Italian historian, archaeologist and jurist

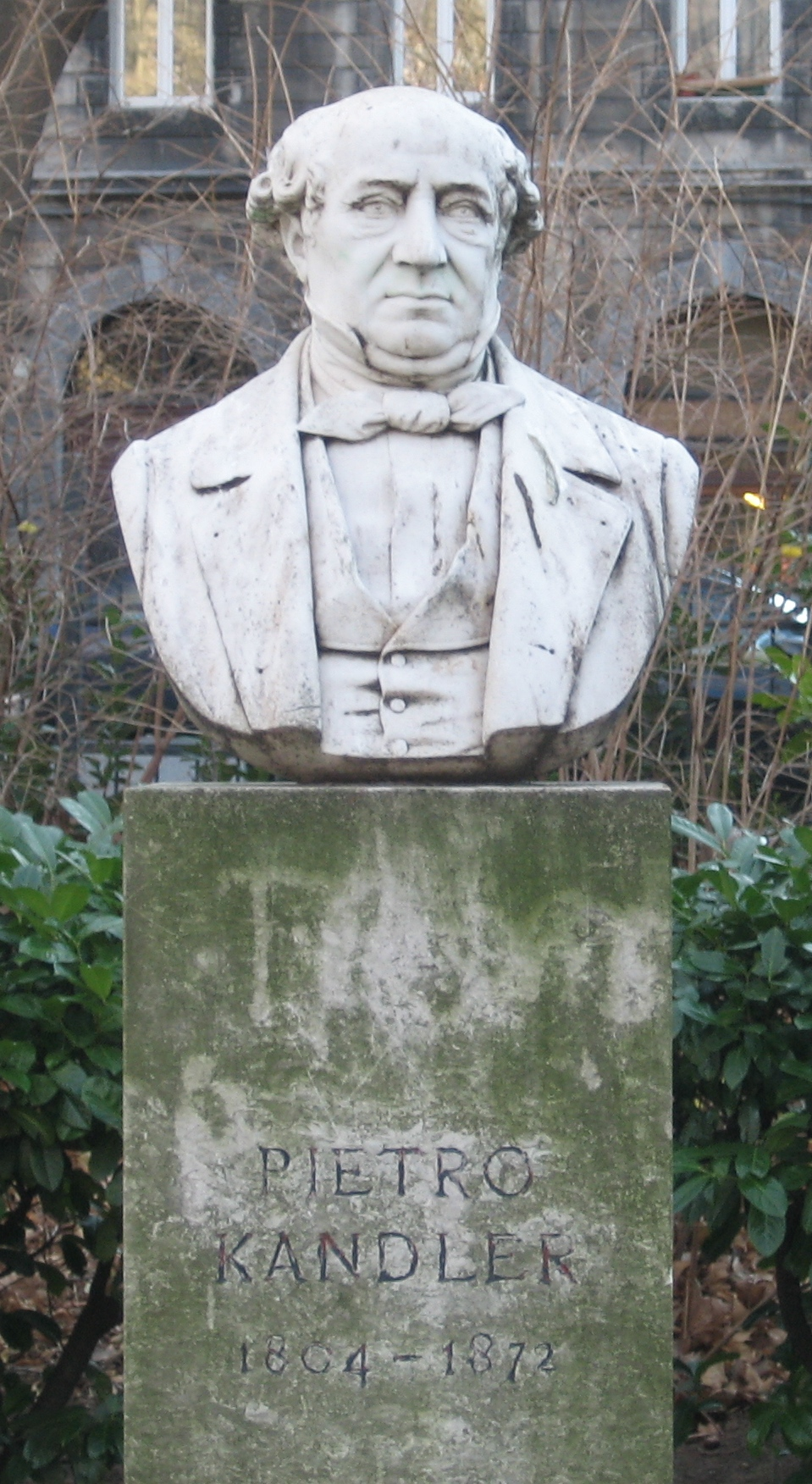
Bust of Kandler in Trieste

Pietro Paolo Kandler (23 May 1804 – 18 January 1872) was an Italian historian, archaeologist and jurist.

== Biography ==
Kandler was born in Trieste to a family who moved there from Vienna in the 17th century (but of Scottish descent: the original surname was Chandler) he was multilingual, but preferred to write in Italian.

Trained in the universities of Vienna and Pavia, where he studied law, he was one of the top exponents of the Trieste culture in the 19th century. His work is characterized by an Enlightenment imprint, derived in particular from the observation of the reforms implemented during the French occupation of Trieste.

He was lawyer of his native comune after the death of Domenico Rossetti De Scander, in whose office he had worked, Kandler was nominated in 1856 conservator of monuments for the Austrian Littoral, the only one that the Hapsburg empire chose for the territories that were later part of Italy, of the provinces of Trieste and Gorizia, and dealt at length with the collection and publication of epigraphs and Roman antiquities present in the north-Adriatic area, with particular regard to the Roman bricks, which Theodor Mommsen used for his Corpus Inscriptionum Latinarum.

Among his best-known works are the Codice diplomatico istriano ("Istrian Diplomatic Code", 1847), in six volumes, in which he collected the statutes of various Istrian cities including Parenzo, Rovigno, Cittanova, and the Storia del consiglio dei patrizi di Trieste ("History of the council of patricians of Trieste", 1858).

Some of his writings bear the pseudonyms of Giusto Traiber and Giovannina Bandelli.

== Works available online ==
- Guida al forestiero nella città di Trieste, Trieste, Tip. Lloyd Austriaco, 1845 (II ed.)
- Cenni al forestiero che visita Pola, Trieste, Papsch & C., 1845.
- Pel fausto ingresso di Mons. Ill.mo e Rev.mo D. Bartolomeo Legat vescovo di Trieste e Capodistria...nella sua chiesa di Trieste..., Trieste, Papsch & C., 1847.
- Fasti sacri e profani di Trieste e dell'Istria, Trieste, Weis, 1849.
- Notizie storiche di Trieste e guida per la città, Trieste, Coen, 1851.
- Inscrizioni dei tempi romani rinvenuti nell'Istria, Trieste, Tip. Lloyd Austriaco, 1855.
- Indicazioni per riconoscere le cose storiche del Litorale, Trieste, Tip. Lloyd Austriaco, 1855.
- Storia del consiglio dei patrizi di Trieste dall'anno 1382 all'anno 1809, Trieste, Tip. Lloyd Austriaco, 1858.
