= List of Madrid Metro stations =

Unofficial network map - as of 2025

This is a list of the stations of the Madrid Metro.

== Line 1 ==
Pinar de Chamartín - Valdecarros

- Pinar de Chamartín
- Bambú
- Chamartín
- Plaza de Castilla
- Valdeacederas
- Tetuán
- Estrecho
- Alvarado
- Cuatro Caminos
- Ríos Rosas
- Iglesia
- Bilbao
- Tribunal
- Gran Vía
- Sol
- Tirso de Molina
- Antón Martín
- Estación del Arte
- Atocha
- Menéndez Pelayo
- Pacífico
- Puente de Vallecas
- Nueva Numancia
- Portazgo
- Buenos Aires
- Alto del Arenal
- Miguel Hernández
- Sierra de Guadalupe
- Villa de Vallecas
- Congosto
- La Gavia
- Las Suertes
- Valdecarros

== Line 2 ==
Las Rosas - Cuatro Caminos

- Las Rosas
- Avenida de Guadalajara
- Alsacia
- La Almudena
- La Elipa
- Ventas
- Manuel Becerra
- Goya
- Príncipe de Vergara
- Retiro
- Banco de España
- Sevilla
- Sol
- Ópera
- Santo Domingo
- Noviciado
- San Bernardo
- Quevedo
- Canal
- Cuatro Caminos

== Line 3 ==
El Casar - Moncloa

- El Casar
- Villaverde Alto
- San Cristóbal
- Villaverde Bajo-Cruce
- Ciudad de los Ángeles
- San Fermín-Orcasur
- Hospital 12 de Octubre
- Almendrales
- Legazpi
- Delicias
- Palos de la Frontera
- Embajadores
- Lavapiés
- Sol
- Callao
- Plaza de España
- Ventura Rodríguez
- Argüelles
- Moncloa

== Line 4 ==
Argüelles - Pinar de Chamartín

- Argüelles
- San Bernardo
- Bilbao
- Alonso Martínez
- Colón
- Serrano
- Velázquez
- Goya
- Lista
- Diego de León
- Avenida de América
- Prosperidad
- Alfonso XIII
- Avenida de la Paz
- Arturo Soria
- Esperanza
- Canillas
- Mar de Cristal
- San Lorenzo
- Parque de Santa María
- Hortaleza
- Manoteras
- Pinar de Chamartín

== Line 5 ==
Alameda de Osuna - Casa de Campo

- Alameda de Osuna
- El Capricho
- Canillejas
- Torre Arias
- Suanzes
- Ciudad Lineal
- Pueblo Nuevo
- Quintana
- El Carmen
- Ventas
- Diego de León
- Núñez de Balboa
- Rubén Darío
- Alonso Martínez
- Chueca
- Gran Vía
- Callao
- Ópera
- La Latina
- Puerta de Toledo
- Acacias
- Pirámides
- Marqués de Vadillo
- Urgel
- Oporto
- Vista Alegre
- Carabanchel
- Eugenia de Montijo
- Aluche
- Empalme
- Campamento
- Casa de Campo

== Line 6 ==
Circular

- Laguna
- Carpetana
- Oporto
- Opañel
- Plaza Elíptica
- Usera
- Legazpi
- Arganzuela-Planetario
- Méndez Álvaro
- Pacífico
- Conde de Casal
- Sainz de Baranda
- O'Donnell
- Manuel Becerra
- Diego de León
- Avenida de América
- República Argentina
- Nuevos Ministerios
- Cuatro Caminos
- Guzmán el Bueno
- Vicente Aleixandre
- Ciudad Universitaria
- Moncloa
- Argüelles
- Príncipe Pío
- Puerta del Ángel
- Alto de Extremadura
- Lucero

== Line 7 ==
Pitis - Hospital del Henares

- Hospital del Henares
- Henares
- Jarama
- San Fernando
- La Rambla
- Coslada Central
- Barrio del Puerto
- Estadio Metropolitano
- Las Musas
- San Blas
- Simancas
- García Noblejas
- Ascao
- Pueblo Nuevo
- Barrio de la Concepción
- Parque de las Avenidas
- Cartagena
- Avenida de América
- Gregorio Marañón
- Alonso Cano
- Canal
- Islas Filipinas
- Guzmán el Bueno
- Francos Rodríguez
- Valdezarza
- Antonio Machado
- Peñagrande
- Avenida de la Ilustración
- Lacoma
- Arroyofresno
- Pitis

== Line 8 ==
Nuevos Ministerios - Aeropuerto T4

- Nuevos Ministerios
- Colombia
- Pinar del Rey
- Mar de Cristal
- Feria de Madrid
- Aeropuerto T1-T2-T3
- Barajas
- Aeropuerto T4

== Line 9 ==
Paco de Lucía - Arganda del Rey

- Paco de Lucía
- Mirasierra
- Herrera Oria
- Barrio del Pilar
- Ventilla
- Plaza de Castilla
- Duque de Pastrana
- Pío XII
- Colombia
- Concha Espina
- Cruz del Rayo
- Avenida de América
- Núñez de Balboa
- Príncipe de Vergara
- Ibiza
- Sainz de Baranda
- Estrella
- Vinateros
- Artilleros
- Pavones
- Valdebernardo
- Vicálvaro
- San Cipriano
- Puerta de Arganda
- Rivas Urbanizaciones
- Rivas Futura
- Rivas Vaciamadrid
- La Poveda
- Arganda del Rey

== Line 10 ==
Hospital Infanta Sofía - Puerta del Sur

- Hospital Infanta Sofía
- Reyes Católicos
- Baunatal
- Manuel de Falla
- Marqués de la Valdavia
- La Moraleja
- La Granja
- Ronda de la Comunicación
- Las Tablas
- Montecarmelo
- Tres Olivos
- Fuencarral
- Begoña
- Chamartín
- Plaza de Castilla
- Cuzco
- Santiago Bernabéu
- Nuevos Ministerios
- Gregorio Marañón
- Alonso Martínez
- Tribunal
- Plaza de España
- Príncipe Pío
- Lago
- Batán
- Casa de Campo
- Colonia Jardín
- Aviación Española
- Cuatro Vientos
- Joaquín Vilumbrales
- Puerta del Sur

== Line 11 ==
Plaza Elíptica - La Fortuna

- Plaza Elíptica
- Abrantes
- Pan Bendito
- San Francisco
- Carabanchel Alto
- La Peseta
- La Fortuna

== Line 12 ==
MetroSur

- Puerta del Sur
- Parque Lisboa
- Alcorcón Central
- Parque Oeste
- Universidad Rey Juan Carlos
- Móstoles Central
- Pradillo
- Hospital de Móstoles
- Manuela Malasaña
- Loranca
- Hospital de Fuenlabrada
- Parque Europa
- Fuenlabrada Central
- Parque de los Estados
- Arroyo Culebro
- Conservatorio
- Alonso de Mendoza
- Getafe Central
- Juan de la Cierva
- El Casar
- Los Espartales
- El Bercial
- El Carrascal
- Julián Besteiro
- Casa del Reloj
- Hospital Severo Ochoa
- Leganés Central
- San Nicasio

== Ramal ==
Ópera - Príncipe Pío

- Ópera
- Príncipe Pío
