= Noviciado (Madrid Metro) =

Madrid Metro station

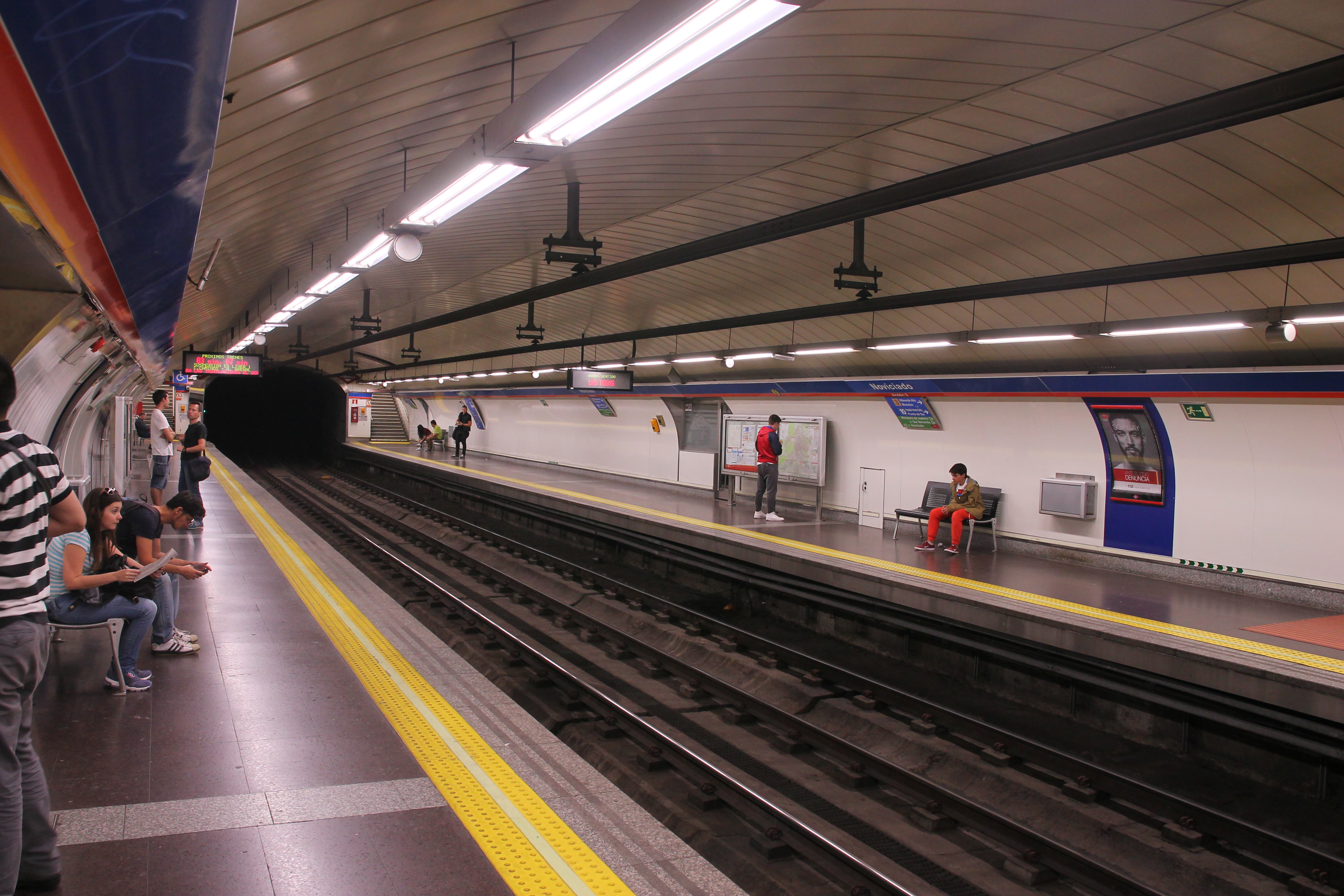

General information
- Location: Centro, Madrid; Spain
- Coordinates: 40.4248706°N 3.7074324°W
- System: Madrid Metro station
- Owner: CRTM
- Operator: CRTM

Construction
- Structure type: Underground

Other information
- Fare zone: A

History
- Opened: 21 October 1925; 100 years ago

Services
Preceding station	Madrid Metro	Following station
Santo Domingo towards Las Rosas	Line 2	San Bernardo towards Cuatro Caminos
Location
- Location within Madrid

Noviciado [noβiˈθjaðo] is a station on the Madrid Metro served by Line 2. It is located in fare Zone A. It's named after Noviciado Street.
