= Diego de León (Madrid Metro) =

Madrid Metro station

- Platforms of the station of the line 6

General information
- Location: Salamanca, Madrid; Spain
- Coordinates: 40.4346757°N 3.6749579°W
- System: Madrid Metro station
- Owner: CRTM
- Operator: CRTM

Construction
- Structure type: Underground
- Accessible: No

Other information
- Fare zone: A

History
- Opened: 17 September 1932; 94 years ago

Services
| Preceding station | Madrid Metro | Following station |
|---|---|---|
| Lista towards Argüelles | Line 4 | Avenida de América towards Pinar de Chamartín |
| Ventas towards Alameda de Osuna | Line 5 | Núñez de Balboa towards Casa de Campo |
| Manuel Becerra clockwise / outer | Line 6 | Avenida de América anticlockwise / inner |
Location
- Location within Madrid

Diego de León [ˈdjeɣo ðe leˈon] is a station on Line 4, Line 5, and Line 6 of the Madrid Metro, located at the intersections of Francisco Silvela, Diego de León, and Conde de Peñalver streets in the Salamanca district of Madrid. It is in Zone A.

The station is named after Diego de León street, which in turn is named after the 19th-century Spanish military and political figure Diego de León.

== History ==
The station was inaugurated on 17 September 1932 as part of a branch line of Line 2 that ran from Diego de León to Goya, where it connected to the rest of Line 2. The branch was considered to be part of Line 2 until 1958, when it was transferred to Line 4.

In 1970, Line 5 was extended to Diego de León. The Line 5 platforms under Juan Bravo street were inaugurated on 26 February, and service began on 2 March. On 26 March 1973, Diego de León ceased to be a terminus station for Line 4 when the line was extended to Alfonso XIII. On 10 October 1979, the first stretch of Line 6 from Pacífico to Cuatro Caminos was inaugurated, including a stop at Diego de León.
