= Banco de España (Madrid Metro) =

Madrid Metro station

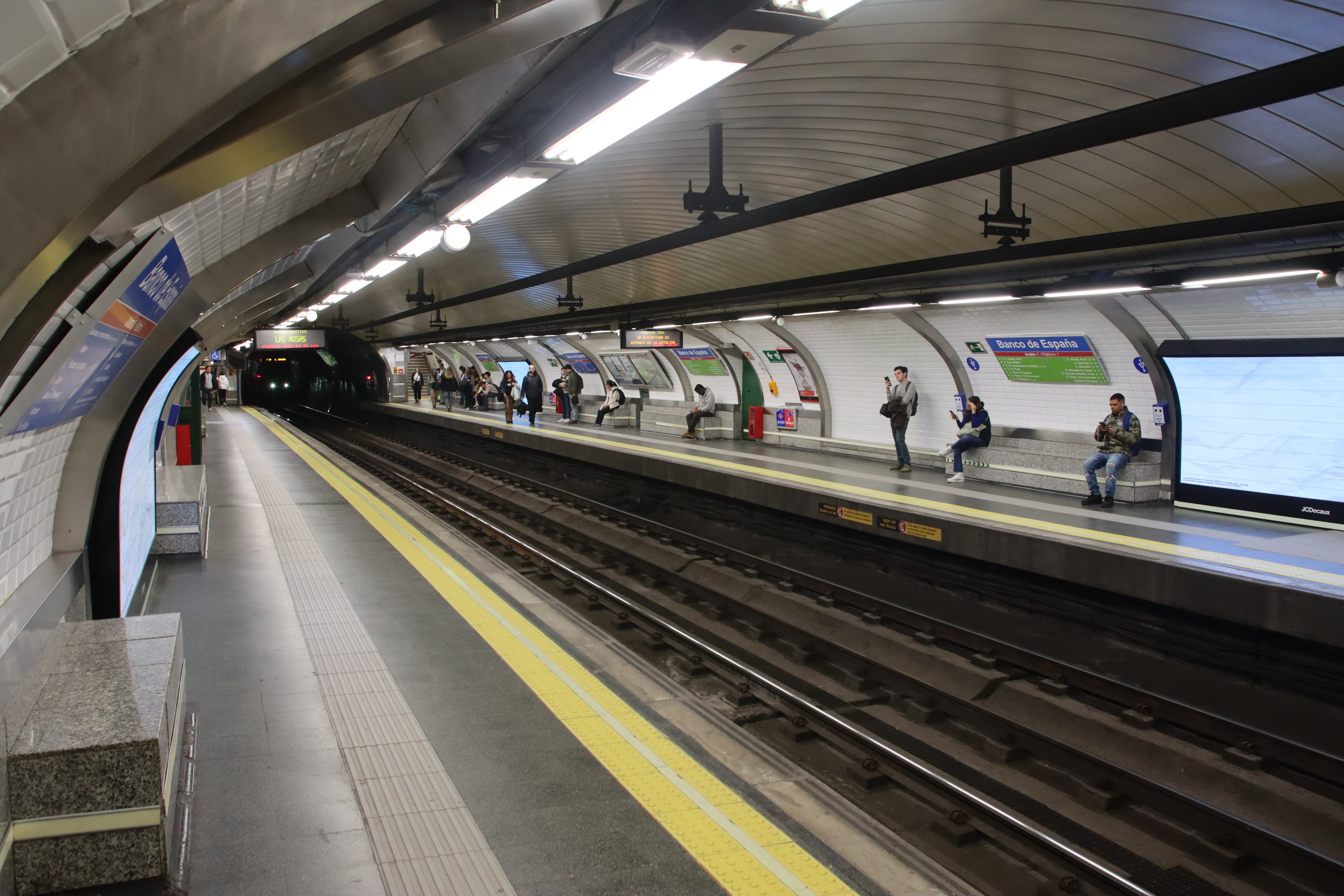

General information
- Location: Centro, Madrid; Spain
- Coordinates: 40.4190564°N 3.6949689°W
- System: Madrid Metro station
- Owner: CRTM
- Operator: CRTM

Construction
- Structure type: Underground
- Accessible: No

Other information
- Fare zone: A

History
- Opened: 15 June 1924; 102 years ago

Services
Preceding station	Madrid Metro	Following station
Retiro towards Las Rosas	Line 2	Sevilla towards Cuatro Caminos
Location
- Location within Madrid

Banco de España [ˈbaŋko ðe esˈpaɲa] is a station on Line 2 of the Madrid Metro located in the Center of Madrid in the Calle de Alcalá, next to the Plaza de Cibeles, perpendicular to the Paseo del Prado.

== History ==
Banco de España station opened on 14 June 1924 with the first stretch of Line 2 between Sol and Ventas. The station is named after the Bank of Spain building located nearby. Another prominent monuments situated near this station are: Cibeles Fountain, Palacio de Linares, Círculo de Bellas Artes, The Communications Palace (currently the Madrid City Hall), the church of San José, the Palacio de Buenavista, the building of the Interior Ministry of Spain and the Fine Arts Theatre.
