= La Elipa (Madrid Metro) =

Madrid Metro station

General information
- Location: Ciudad Lineal, Madrid; Spain
- Coordinates: 40.4266173°N 3.6505221°W
- System: Madrid Metro station
- Owner: CRTM
- Operator: CRTM

Construction
- Structure type: Underground
- Accessible: Yes

Other information
- Fare zone: A

History
- Opened: 16 February 2007; 19 years ago

Services
Preceding station	Madrid Metro	Following station
La Almudena towards Las Rosas	Line 2	Ventas towards Cuatro Caminos
Location
- Location within Madrid

La Elipa [la eˈli.pa] is a station on Line 2 of the Madrid Metro. It is located in fare Zone A. It is named for the La Elipa neighborhood, and contains murals by Esther García Ocampo.
