= Sevilla (Madrid Metro) =

Madrid Metro station

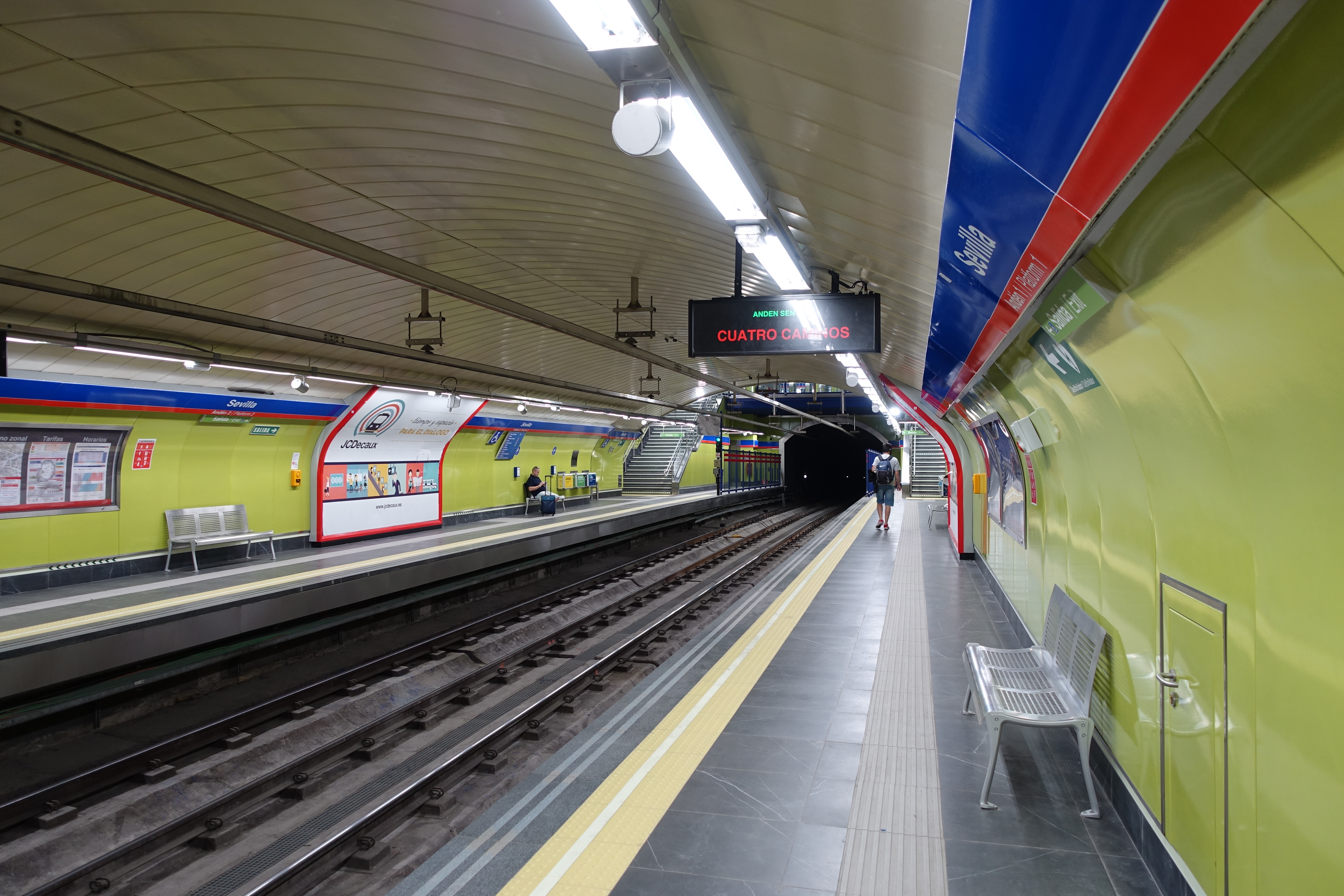

General information
- Location: Centro, Madrid; Spain
- Coordinates: 40.418054°N 3.6992503°W
- System: Madrid Metro station
- Owner: CRTM
- Operator: CRTM

Construction
- Structure type: Underground
- Accessible: Yes

Other information
- Fare zone: A

History
- Opened: 15 June 1924; 102 years ago

Services
Preceding station	Madrid Metro	Following station
Banco de España towards Las Rosas	Line 2	Sol towards Cuatro Caminos
Location
- Location within Madrid

Sevilla [seˈβiʝa] is a station on Line 2 of the Madrid Metro, named for the Calle de Sevilla ("Seville Street"). It is located in fare Zone A. The station was opened on 15 June 1924 as part of Line 2.

On 11 May 2019, the station was reopened after more than a year of extensive renovation works, during which three elevators were installed, making it fully accessible for people with physical disabilities. Additional improvements included an improved fire protection system and new toll gates.

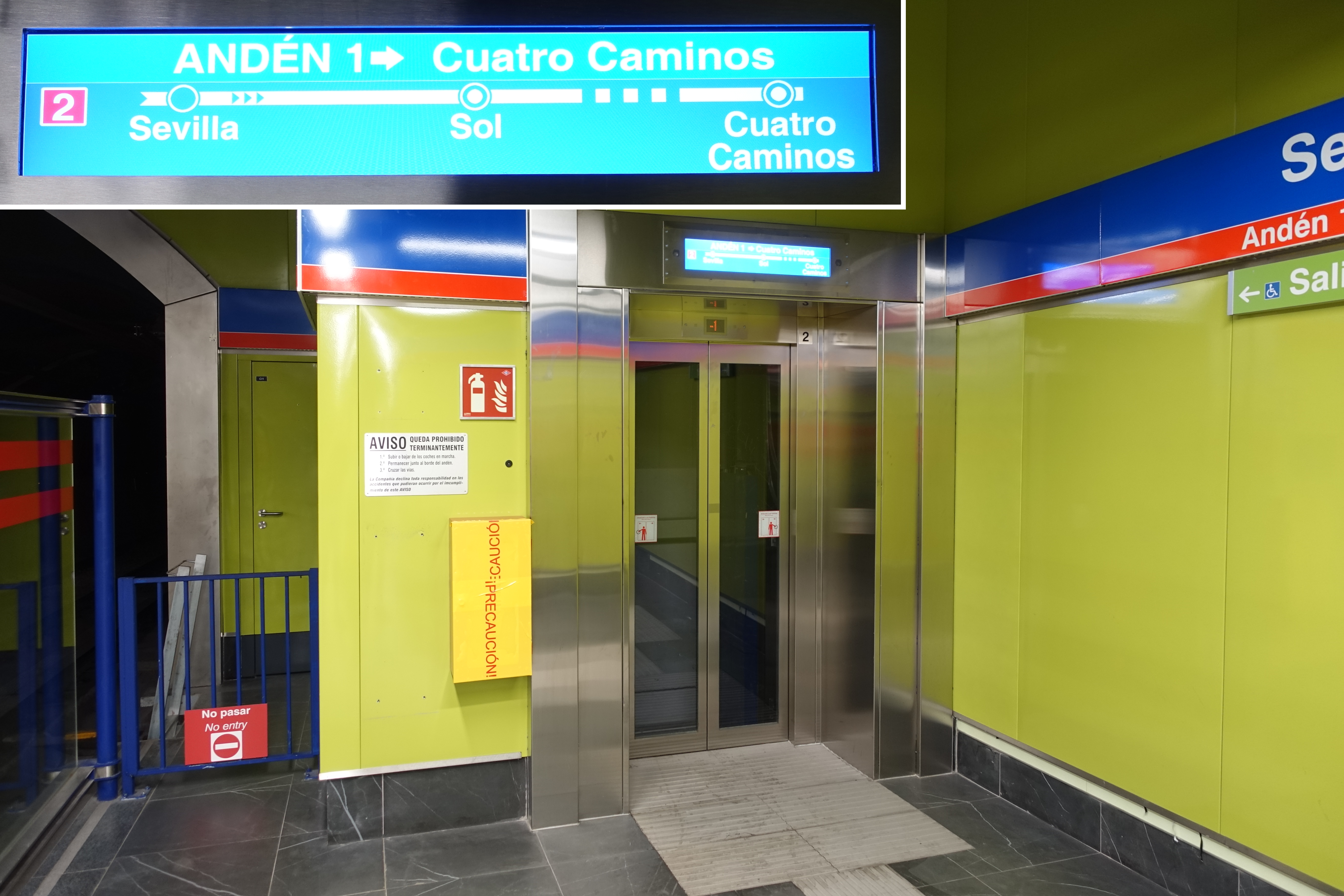
New elevator with info panel
