= Príncipe de Vergara (Madrid Metro) =

Madrid Metro station

General information
- Location: Salamanca, Madrid; Spain
- Coordinates: 40.4229427°N 3.6801218°W
- System: Madrid Metro station
- Owner: CRTM
- Operator: CRTM

Construction
- Structure type: Underground
- Accessible: Yes

Other information
- Fare zone: A

History
- Opened: 14 June 1924; 102 years ago

Services
Preceding station	Madrid Metro	Following station
Goya towards Las Rosas	Line 2	Retiro towards Cuatro Caminos
Núñez de Balboa towards Paco de Lucía	Line 9	Ibiza towards Arganda del Rey
Location
- Location within Madrid

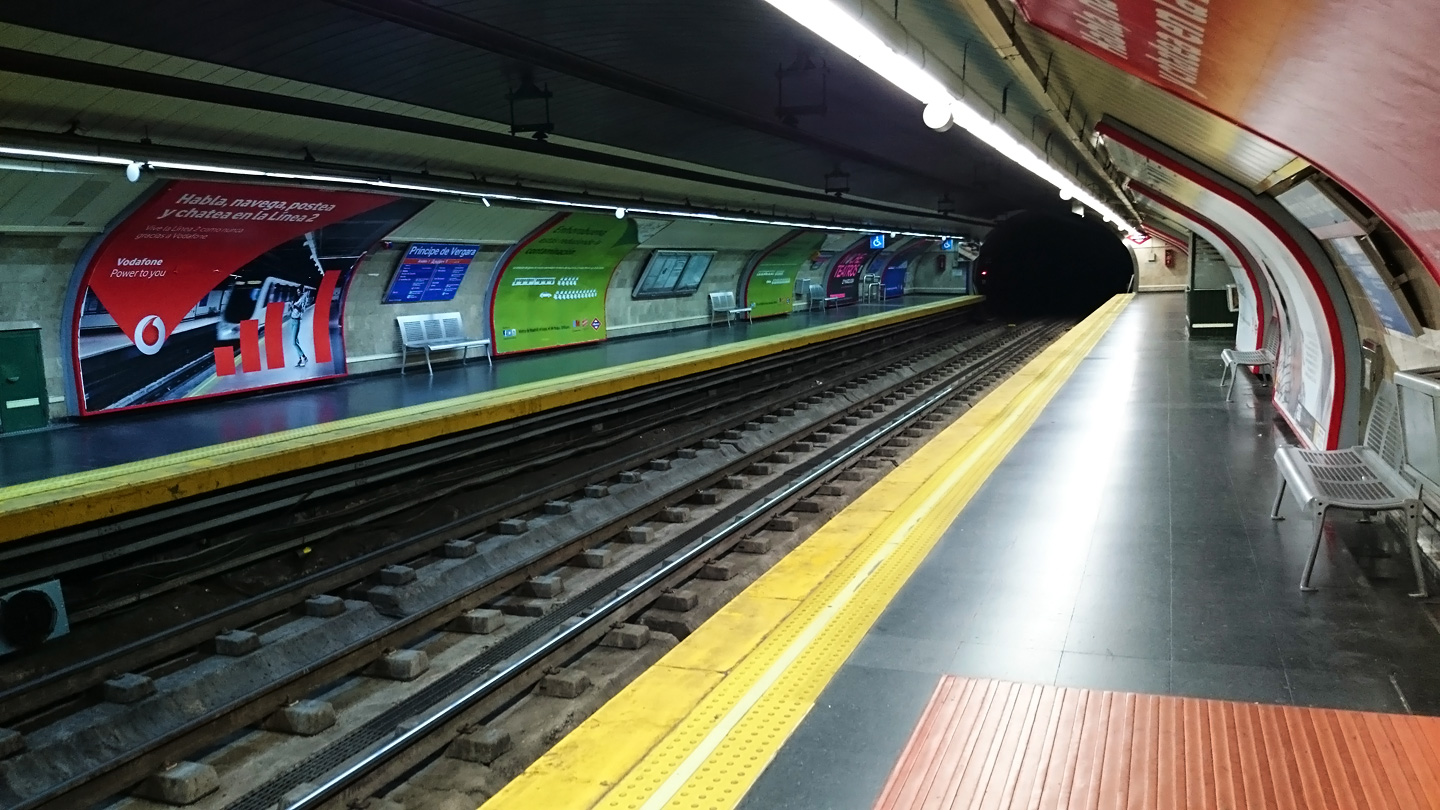
Príncipe de Vergara station platforms

Príncipe de Vergara [ˈpɾinθipe ðe βeɾˈɣaɾa] is a station on Line 2 and Line 9 of the Madrid Metro. It takes its name from the Calle del Príncipe de Vergara, which was named in honor of Baldomero Espartero, Prince of Vergara.
