= Manuel Becerra (Madrid Metro) =

Madrid Metro station

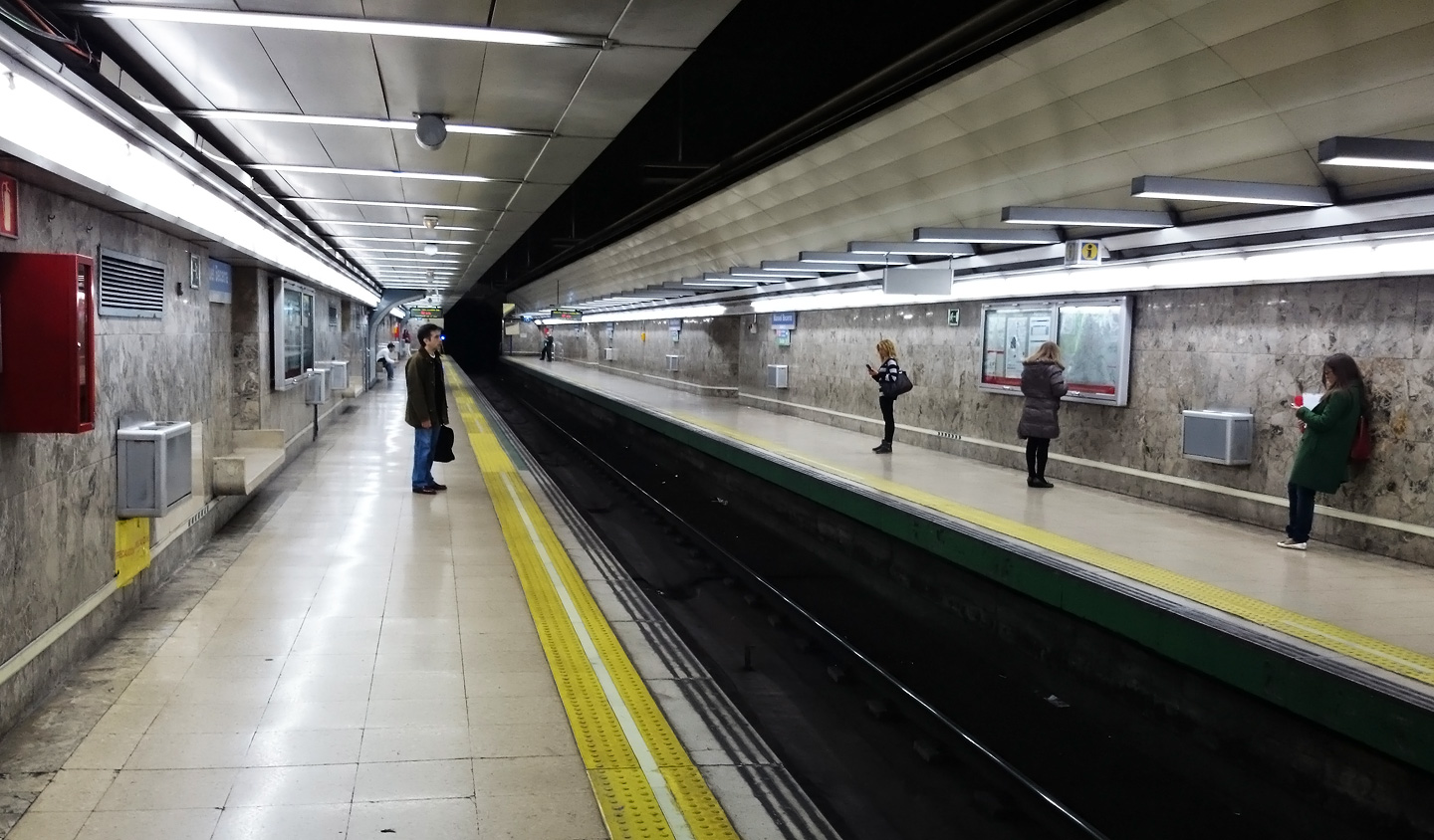

General information
- Location: Salamanca, Madrid; Spain
- Coordinates: 40.4279069°N 3.6692552°W
- System: Madrid Metro station
- Owner: CRTM
- Operator: CRTM

Construction
- Structure type: Underground
- Accessible: No

Other information
- Fare zone: A

History
- Opened: 14 June 1924; 102 years ago

Services
Preceding station	Madrid Metro	Following station
Ventas towards Las Rosas	Line 2	Goya towards Cuatro Caminos
O'Donnell clockwise / outer	Line 6	Diego de León anticlockwise / inner
Location
- Location within Madrid

Manuel Becerra [maˈnwel βeˈθera] is a station on Line 2 and Line 6 of the Madrid Metro, located in the Plaza de Manuel Becerra, Salamanca district in fare Zone A. The station is named after the plaza, which was named for 19th-century politician Manuel Becerra y Bermúdez.

== History ==
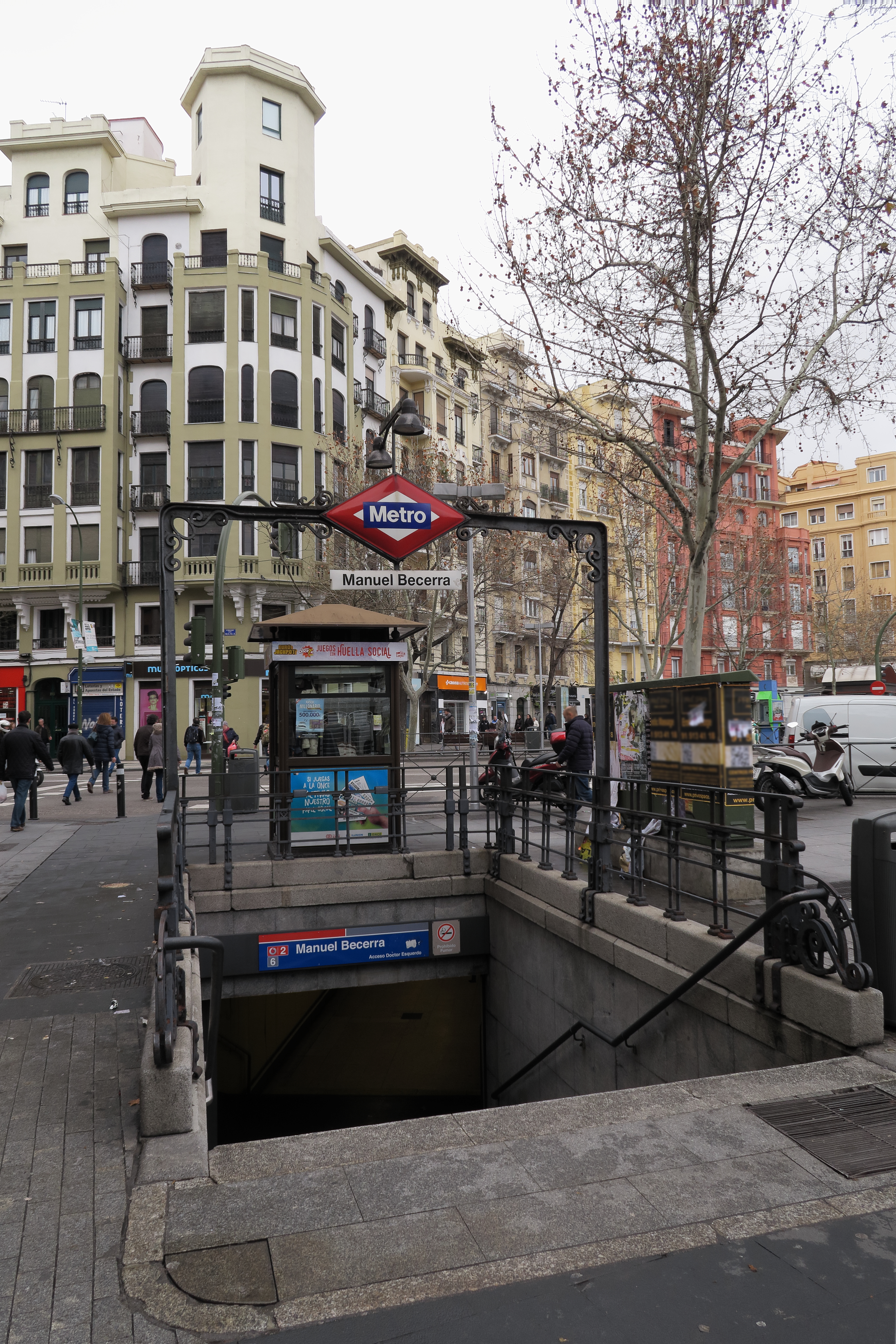
Entrance to Manuel Becerra station

The station was inaugurated on 14 June 1924 when Line 2 was opened. The vestibule is located under the Plaza de Manuel Becerra. The Line 2 platforms are not very deep and are located just west of the plaza under the Calle de Alcalá. The Line 6 platforms are deeper and were opened when the first stretch of Line 6 was inaugurated on 10 October 1979.

After the Spanish Civil War, the plaza's name was changed to the Plaza de Roma, but the station's name did not change. In the early 1970s, when Line 6 was being built, signs were installed reading "Plaza de Roma", but before the line opened, they were replaced with signs reading "Manuel Becerra". The plaza's name was changed back to Manuel Becerra in 1980 after the Spanish transition to democracy.
