= Retiro (Madrid Metro) =

Madrid Metro station

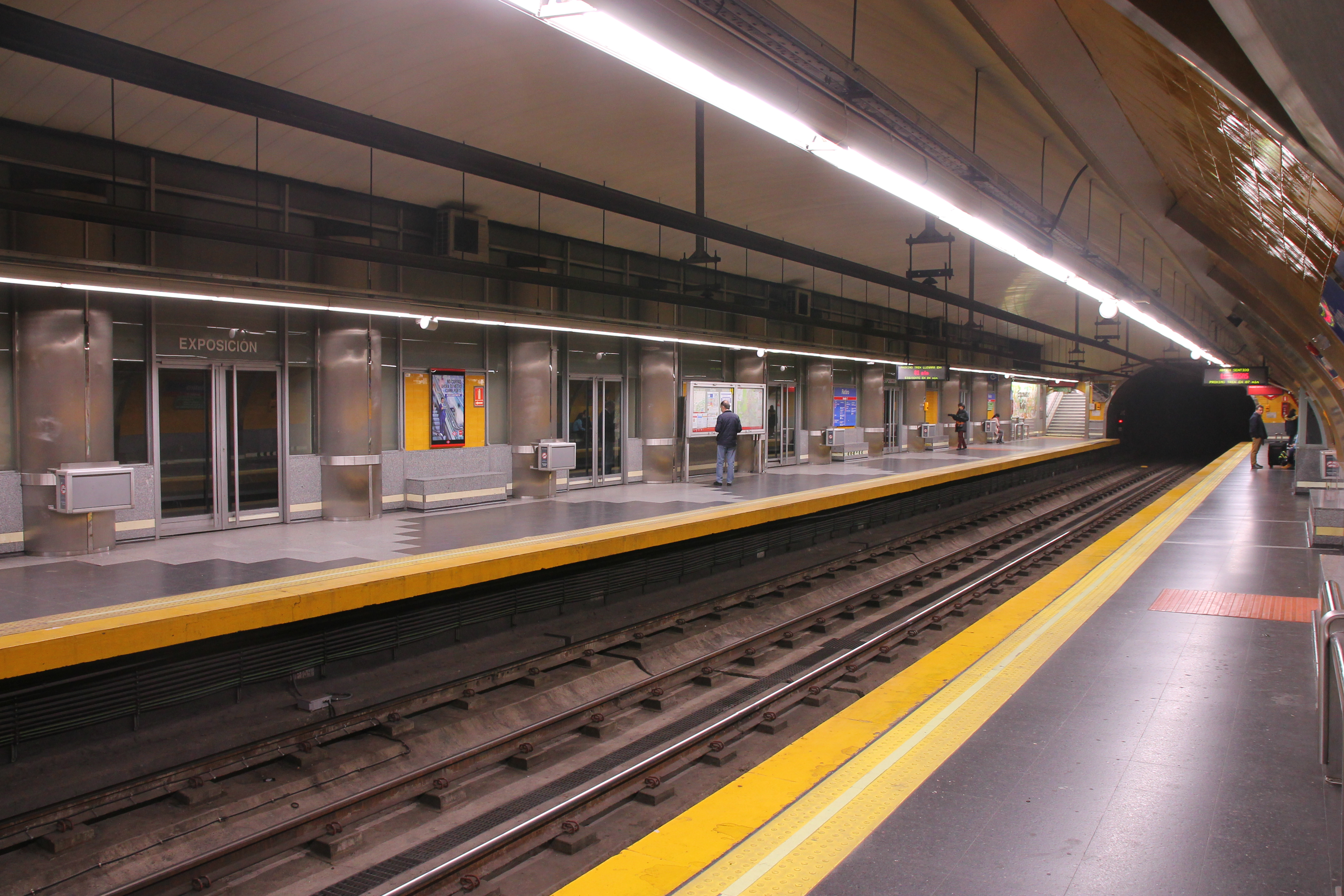

General information
- Location: Retiro / Salamanca, Madrid; Spain
- Coordinates: 40.4203029°N 3.6862484°W
- System: Madrid Metro station
- Owner: CRTM
- Operator: CRTM

Construction
- Structure type: Underground
- Accessible: No

Other information
- Fare zone: A

History
- Opened: 14 June 1924; 102 years ago

Services
Preceding station	Madrid Metro	Following station
Príncipe de Vergara towards Las Rosas	Line 2	Banco de España towards Cuatro Caminos
Location
- Location within Madrid

Retiro [reˈtiɾo] is a metro station which serves the Retiro District and Buen Retiro Park in Madrid, Spain.
