= O'Donnell (Madrid Metro) =

Madrid Metro station

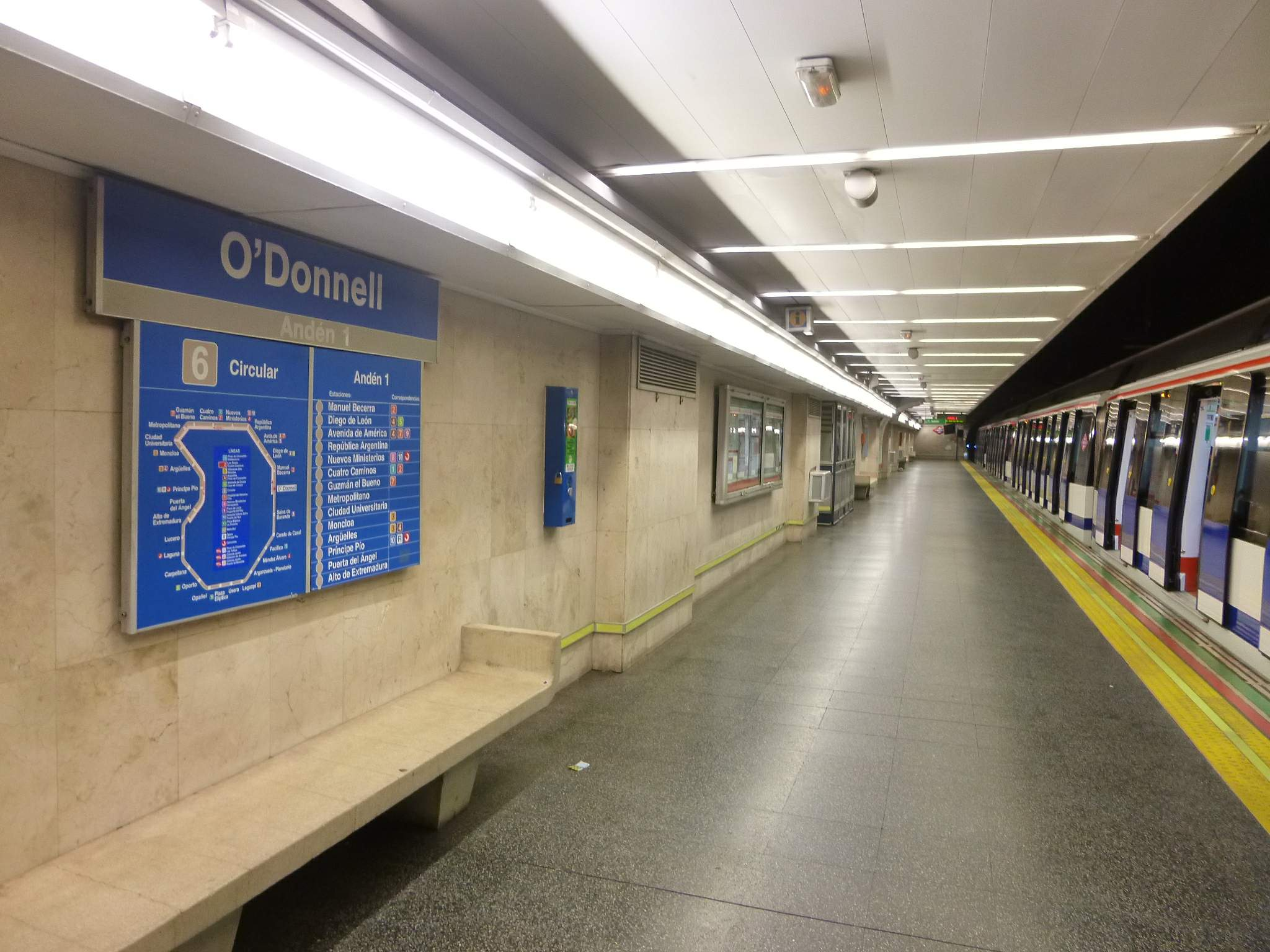

General information
- Location: Retiro / Salamanca, Madrid; Spain
- Coordinates: 40.4228927°N 3.6685926°W
- System: Madrid Metro station
- Owner: CRTM
- Operator: CRTM

Construction
- Accessible: No

Other information
- Fare zone: A

History
- Opened: 10 October 1979

Services
Preceding station	Madrid Metro	Following station
Sainz de Baranda clockwise / outer	Line 6	Manuel Becerra anticlockwise / inner
Location
- Location within Madrid

O'Donnell [oˈðonel] is a station on Line 6 of the Madrid Metro, located near the Royal Mint of Spain and in fare Zone A. It serves the neighborhoods of Goya and Fuente del Berro in the Salamanca district and the neighborhood of Ibiza in the Retiro district of Madrid. The station was inaugurated on 10 October 1979 along with all of the other stations between Pacífico and Cuatro Caminos. The station is named after Calle de O'Donnell, which in turn is named after the 19th-century Spanish politician Leopoldo O'Donnell.
