= Santo Domingo (Madrid Metro) =

Madrid Metro station

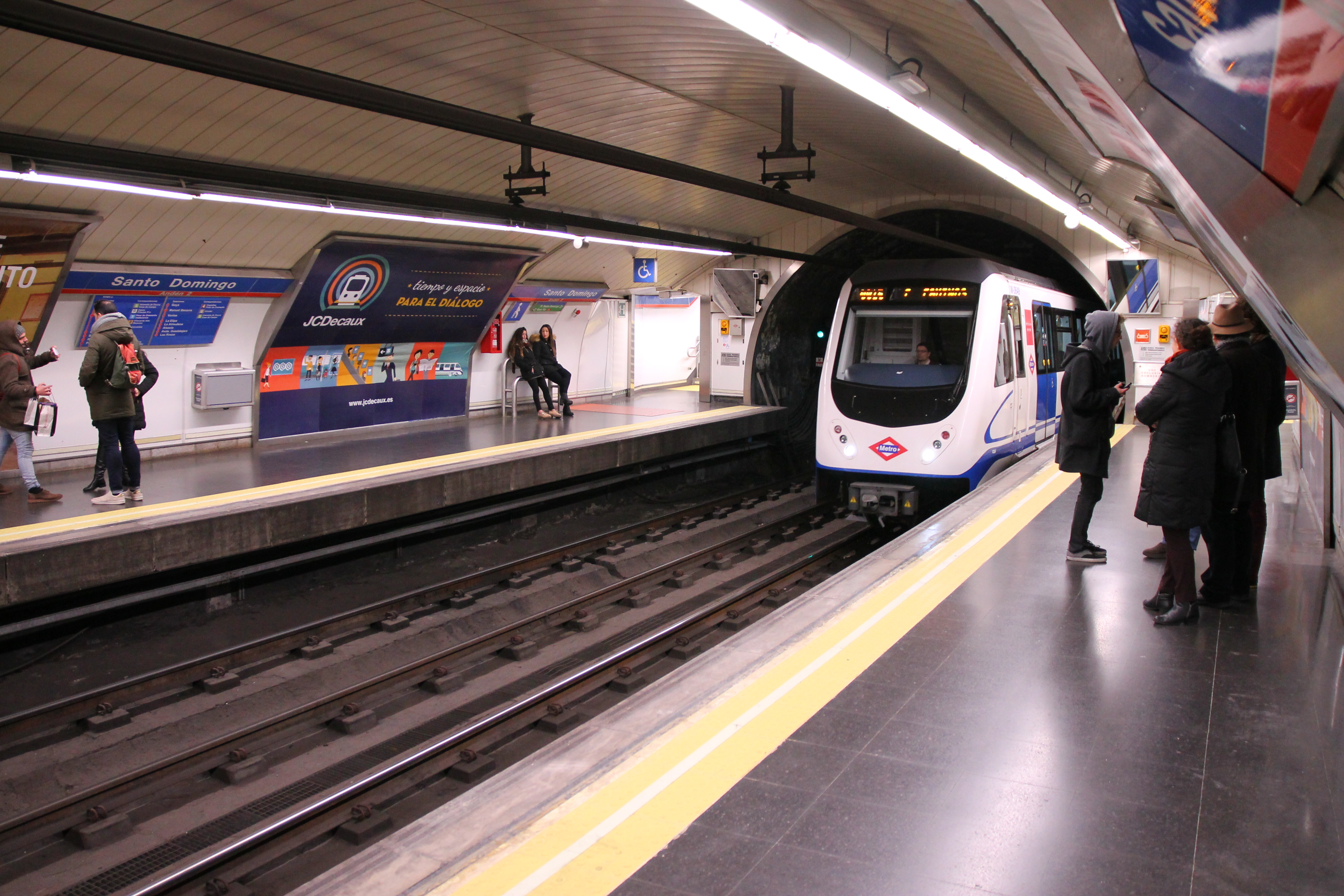
- Train of serie 3000 approaching the station

General information
- Location: Centro, Madrid; Spain
- Coordinates: 40.4213164°N 3.7079598°W
- System: Madrid Metro station
- Owner: CRTM
- Operator: CRTM

Construction
- Structure type: Underground
- Accessible: No

Other information
- Fare zone: A

History
- Opened: 21 October 1925; 100 years ago

Services
Preceding station	Madrid Metro	Following station
Ópera towards Las Rosas	Line 2	Noviciado towards Cuatro Caminos
Location
- Location within Madrid

Santo Domingo [ˈsanto ðoˈmiŋɡo] is a station on Line 2 of the Madrid Metro, named for the Plaza de Santo Domingo ("Saint Dominic Place"). It is located in fare Zone A.

== History ==
The station opened on 21 October 1925.
