= La Almudena (Madrid Metro) =

Madrid Metro station

- Platforms of the station

General information
- Location: Ciudad Lineal, Madrid; Spain
- Coordinates: 40.4236175°N 3.6391412°W
- System: Madrid Metro station
- Owner: CRTM
- Operator: CRTM

Construction
- Structure type: Underground
- Accessible: Yes

Other information
- Fare zone: A

History
- Opened: 16 March 2011; 15 years ago

Services
Preceding station	Madrid Metro	Following station
Alsacia towards Las Rosas	Line 2	La Elipa towards Cuatro Caminos
Location
- Location within Madrid

La Almudena [la almuˈðena] is a station on Line 2 of the Madrid Metro, located east of the Cementerio de la Almudena. It is located in fare Zone A.
