= San Bernardo (Madrid Metro) =

Madrid Metro station

- Platforms of the station

General information
- Location: Centro / Chamberí, Madrid; Spain
- Coordinates: 40.4297496°N 3.7057433°W
- System: Madrid Metro station
- Owner: CRTM
- Operator: CRTM

Construction
- Structure type: Underground
- Accessible: No

Other information
- Fare zone: A

History
- Opened: 21 October 1925; 100 years ago

Services
Preceding station	Madrid Metro	Following station
Noviciado towards Las Rosas	Line 2	Quevedo towards Cuatro Caminos
Argüelles Terminus	Line 4	Bilbao towards Pinar de Chamartín
Location
- Location within Madrid

San Bernardo is a station on Line 2 and Line 4 of the Madrid Metro. It is located in fare Zone A.

== History ==
Plan of the station entrances

The station was opened on 21 October 1925 as part of Line 2.

On 24 March 1944 it was expanded to include platforms for Line 4.
