= Ventas (Madrid Metro) =

Madrid Metro station

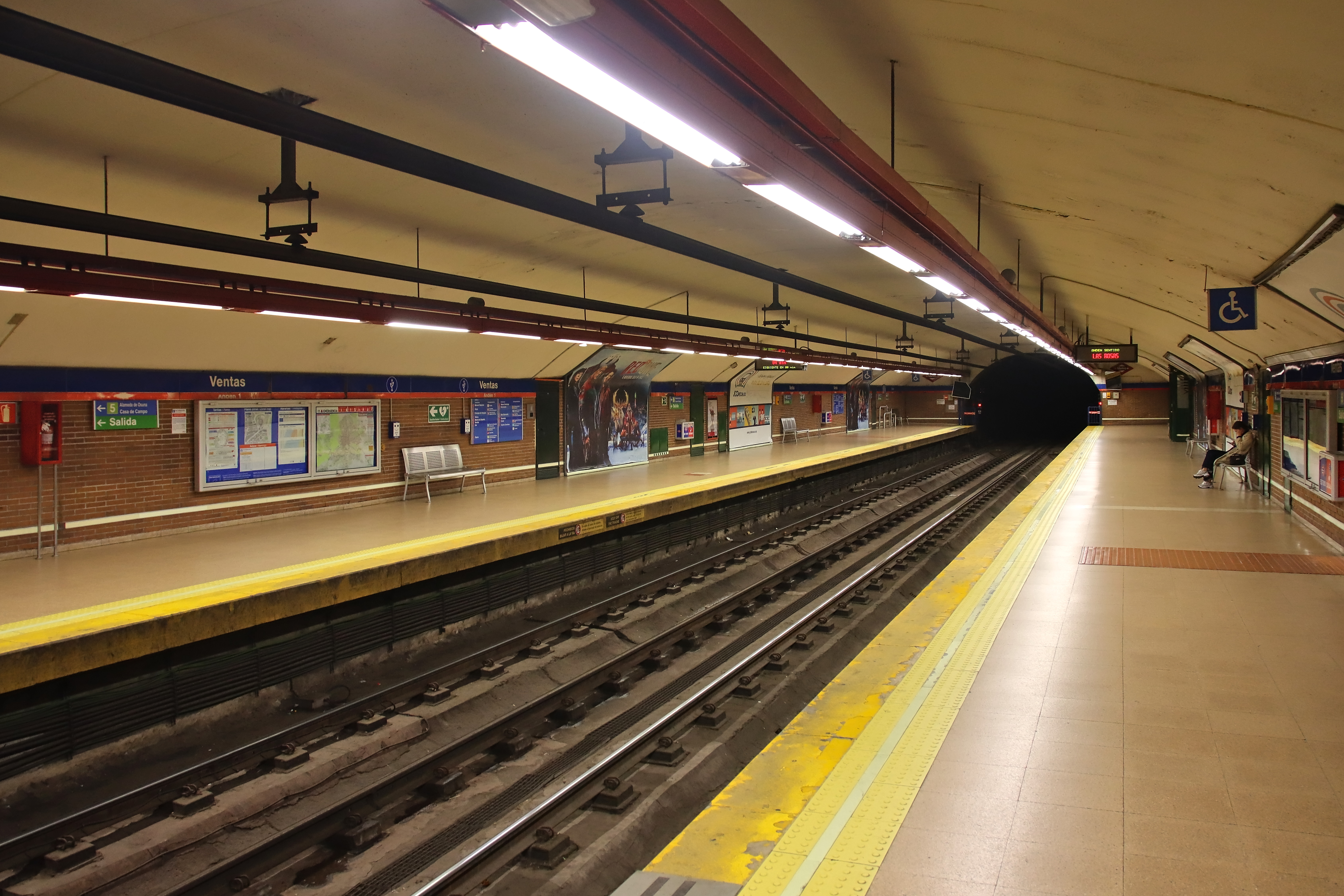

General information
- Location: Salamanca, Madrid; Spain
- Coordinates: 40.4308851°N 3.6636615°W
- System: Madrid Metro station
- Owner: CRTM
- Operator: CRTM

Construction
- Structure type: Underground
- Accessible: No

Other information
- Fare zone: A

History
- Opened: 14 June 1924; 102 years ago

Services
Preceding station	Madrid Metro	Following station
La Elipa towards Las Rosas	Line 2	Manuel Becerra towards Cuatro Caminos
El Carmen towards Alameda de Osuna	Line 5	Diego de León towards Casa de Campo
Location
- Location within Madrid

Ventas [ˈbentas] is a station on Line 2 and Line 5 of the Madrid Metro. It is located in fare Zone A. The station gives service to Plaza de Toros de Las Ventas, Madrid's main bullfighting ring.
