= Guzmán el Bueno (Madrid Metro) =

Madrid Metro station

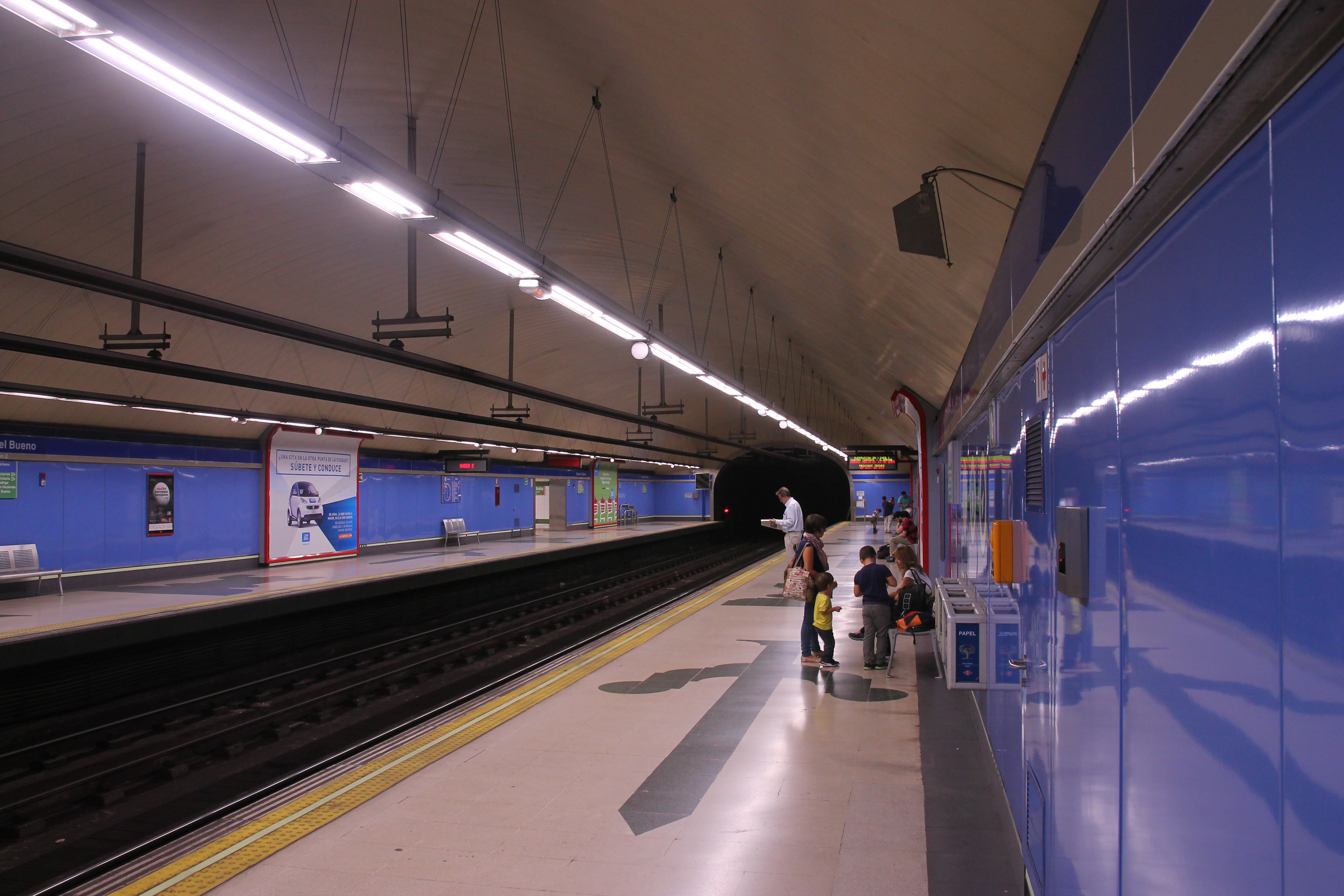
- Line 6 platforms at Guzmán el Bueno showing the sword tilework motif

General information
- Location: Chamberí / Moncloa-Aravaca, Madrid; Spain
- Coordinates: 40.446362°N 3.7122904°W
- System: Madrid Metro station
- Owner: CRTM
- Operator: CRTM

Construction
- Accessible: yes

Other information
- Fare zone: A

History
- Opened: 13 January 1987; 39 years ago

Services
Preceding station	Madrid Metro	Following station
Cuatro Caminos clockwise / outer	Line 6	Vicente Aleixandre anticlockwise / inner
Islas Filipinas towards Hospital del Henares	Line 7	Francos Rodríguez towards Pitis
Location
- Location within Madrid

Guzmán el Bueno [ɡuθˈman el ˈβweno] is a station on Line 6 and Line 7 of the Madrid Metro located underneath the Avenida de la Reina Victoria between the neighborhoods of Vallehermoso in Chamberí district and Ciudad Universitaria in Moncloa-Aravaca district in Madrid. It is in fare Zone A. The station was named after the Calle de Guzmán el Bueno, which is named for the medieval Spanish nobleman Alonso Pérez de Guzmán (1256–1309), known as Guzmán el Bueno ("Guzmán the Good").

== History ==
The station opened on 13 January 1987 when Line 6 was extended from Cuatro Caminos to Ciudad Universitaria. At the time, it was one of the deepest stations in the network, at some 40 m (130 ft) beneath the surface. The platforms feature tile mosaics of towers and swords, referencing the historical figure Guzmán el Bueno. On 12 February 1999, the Line 7 platforms were inaugurated as part of an extension of the line from Canal to Valdezarza. At the same time, elevators were installed, making the station accessible.
