= Line 2 (Madrid Metro) =

Rapid transit line of the Madrid Metro

Coordinates: 40.4180°N 3.6993°W

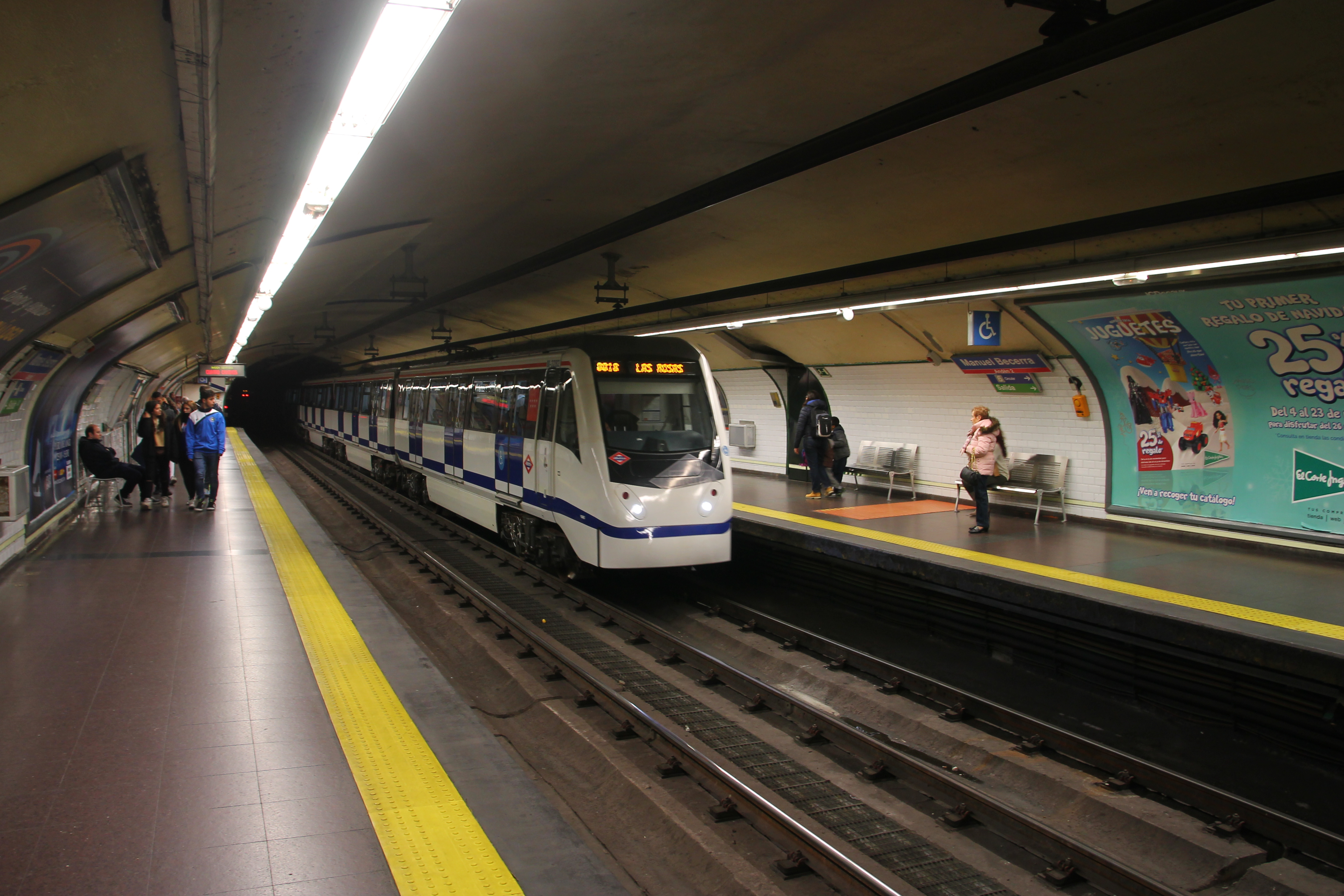
- A Class 3000 train at Manuel Becerra station

Overview
- Native name: Línea 2
- Owner: CRTM
- Locale: Madrid
- Termini: Cuatro Caminos; Las Rosas
- Stations: 20
- Website: www.metromadrid.es/en/linea/linea-2

Service
- Type: Rapid transit
- System: Madrid Metro
- Operator: CRTM
- Rolling stock: CAF 3000

History
- Opened: 11 June 1924; 102 years ago
- Last extension: 2011

Technical
- Line length: 14.031 km (8.718 mi)
- Character: Underground
- Track gauge: 1,445 mm (4 ft 8 7/8 in)

Line 2 of the Madrid Metro is a rapid transit line in Madrid. It runs through the city center between the Las Rosas and Cuatro Caminos stations, for a total of 20 stations (the Cuatro Caminos - La Elipa section with 60-metre platforms and the La Almudena - Las Rosas with 90-metre platforms), linked by 14.1 km of track in a narrow gauge tunnel, with a journey that lasts approximately 33 minutes. Despite being one of the oldest and shortest in the system, it has undergone various expansions throughout its existence. The first ended up as new lines (the Goya-Diego de León branch absorbed by line 4 and the Ventas-Ciudad Lineal extension absorbed by line 5) and the recent extensions to La Elipa and Las Rosas have taken the line to the eastern periphery of the city.

Most stations have side platforms, except Cuatro Caminos, which has a side platform and a central platform. The stations in the section between Quevedo and Santo Domingo, both included, are not adapted. The Banco de España, Retiro, Manuel Becerra and Ventas stations are also not accessible. Taking this into account, 60% of the stations on this line are accessible.

The rolling stock is made up of CAF 3000 series 4-car MRSM trains.

== History ==
It first opened on 11 June 1924 and originally ran between Sol and Ventas stations. Line 2 was extended from Sol to Quevedo on 27 December 1925, and then further to Cuatro Caminos on 1 September 1929.

In 1932, a branch from Goya to Diego de León was added, though this branch was transferred to Line 4 in 1958. In 1964 the line was extended from Ventas to Ciudad Lineal, though this too was transferred, to Line 5 in 1970. Later, Canal was added as an infill station between Quevedo and Cuatro Caminos to provide interchange with the extended Line 7 on 16 October 1998.

On 16 February 2007 the line was extended from Ventas to La Elipa, with the intention of providing an interchange with Line 11 in the future. Additionally, Line 2 was extended past La Elipa to Las Rosas on 16 March 2011.

From 2013-2016, the line was called Línea 2 Vodafone due to a sponsorship by Vodafone.

The Sevilla station was temporarily closed in 2019 due for improvements and maintenance.

== Rolling stock ==
Line 2 has used four-car trains of CAF class 3400 since the summer 2007.

== Stations ==
District	Station	Opened	Zone	Connections
Chamberí / Tetuán	Cuatro Caminos	1929	A	Madrid Metro:
Chamberí	Canal	1998	A	Madrid Metro:
Chamberí	Quevedo	1925	A	
Chamberí / Centro	San Bernardo	1925	A	Madrid Metro:
Centro	Plaza de España-Noviciado	1925	A	Madrid Metro:
Centro	Santo Domingo	1925	A	
Centro	Ópera	1925	A	Madrid Metro:
Centro	Sol	1919	A	Madrid Metro: Cercanías Madrid:
Centro	Sevilla	1924	A	
Centro	Banco de España	1924	A	
Retiro / Salamanca	Retiro	1924	A	
Salamanca	Príncipe de Vergara	1924	A	Madrid Metro:
Salamanca	Goya	1924	A	Madrid Metro:
Salamanca	Manuel Becerra	1924	A	Madrid Metro:
Salamanca	Ventas	1924	A	Madrid Metro:
Ciudad Lineal	La Elipa	2007	A	
Ciudad Lineal	La Almudena	2011	A	
San Blas-Canillejas	Alsacia	2011	A	
San Blas-Canillejas	Avenida de Guadalajara	2011	A	
San Blas-Canillejas	Las Rosas	2011	A	

== Gallery ==
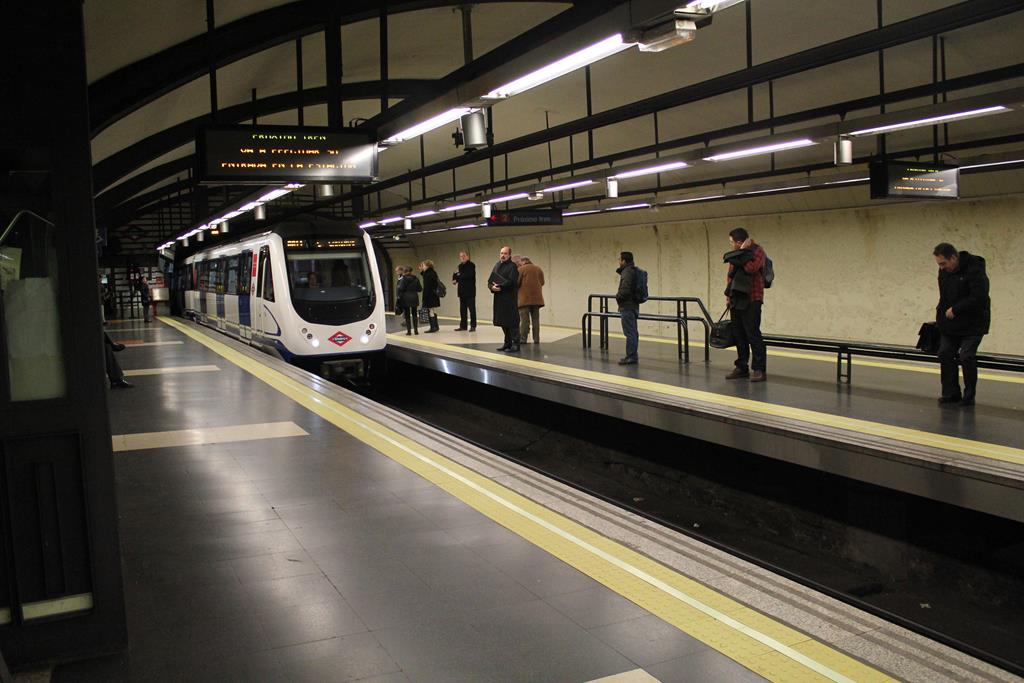
The terminal station at Cuatro Caminos

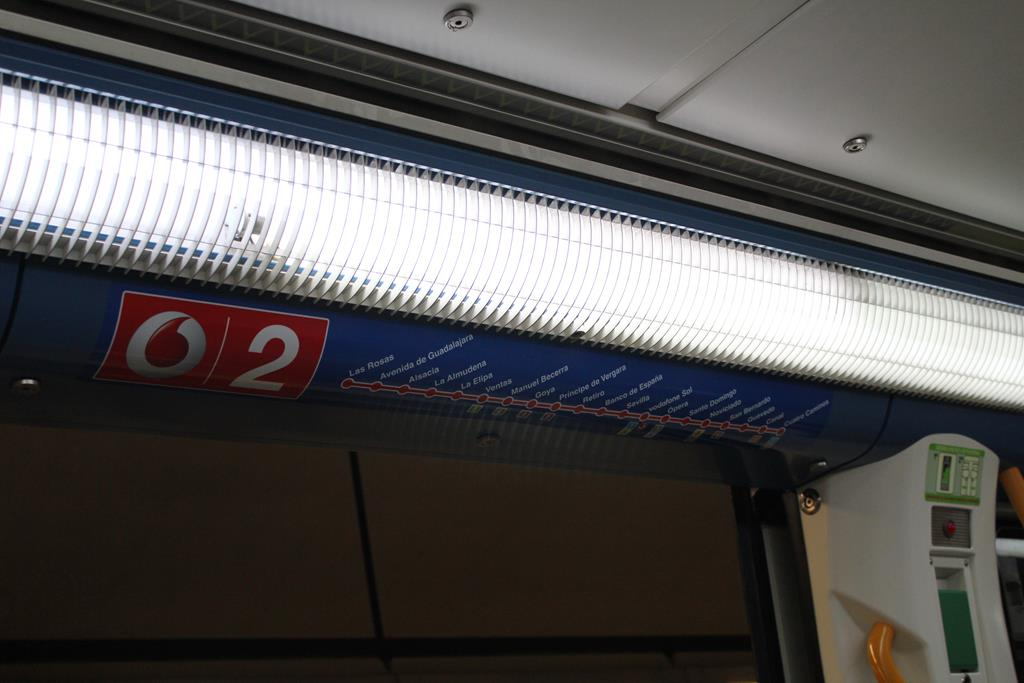
An in-train line diagram

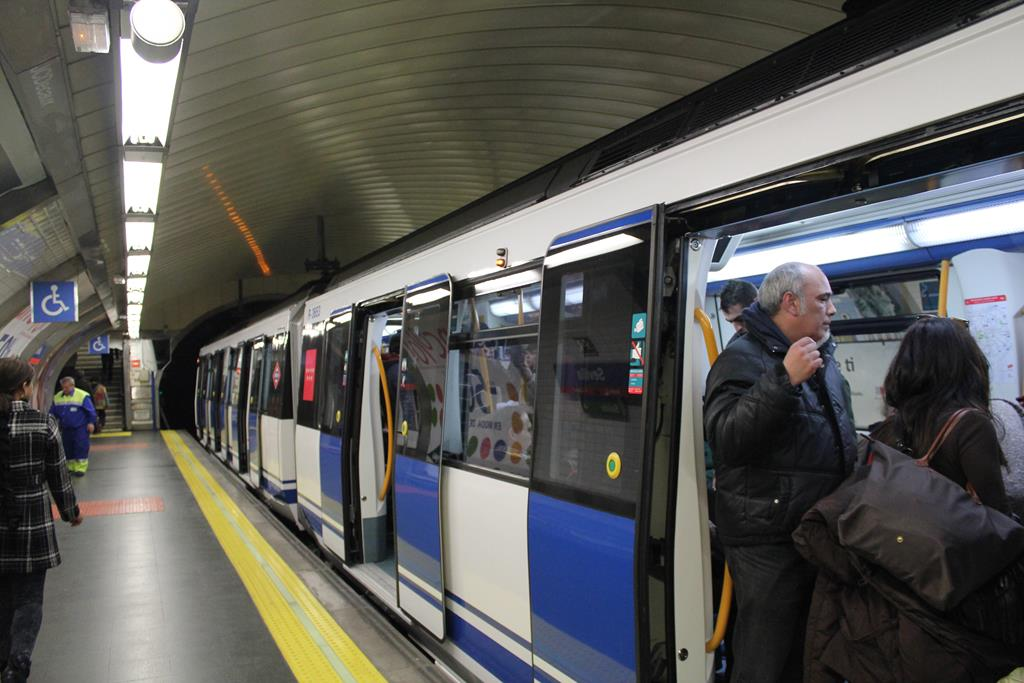
Sevilla station

== See also ==
- Madrid
- Madrid Metro
- Transport in Madrid
- List of Madrid Metro stations
- List of metro systems
