= Avenida de Guadalajara (Madrid Metro) =

Madrid Metro station

- Platforms of the station

General information
- Location: San Blas, Madrid; Spain
- Coordinates: 40.4223943°N 3.6120645°W
- System: Madrid Metro station
- Owner: CRTM
- Operator: CRTM

Construction
- Structure type: Underground
- Accessible: Yes

Other information
- Fare zone: A

History
- Opened: 16 March 2011; 15 years ago

Services
Preceding station	Madrid Metro	Following station
Las Rosas Terminus	Line 2	Alsacia towards Cuatro Caminos
Location
- Location within Madrid

Avenida de Guadalajara [aβeˈniða ðe ɣwaðalaˈxaɾa] is a station on Line 2 of the Madrid Metro. It is located in fare Zone A.
