= Quevedo (Madrid Metro) =

Madrid Metro station

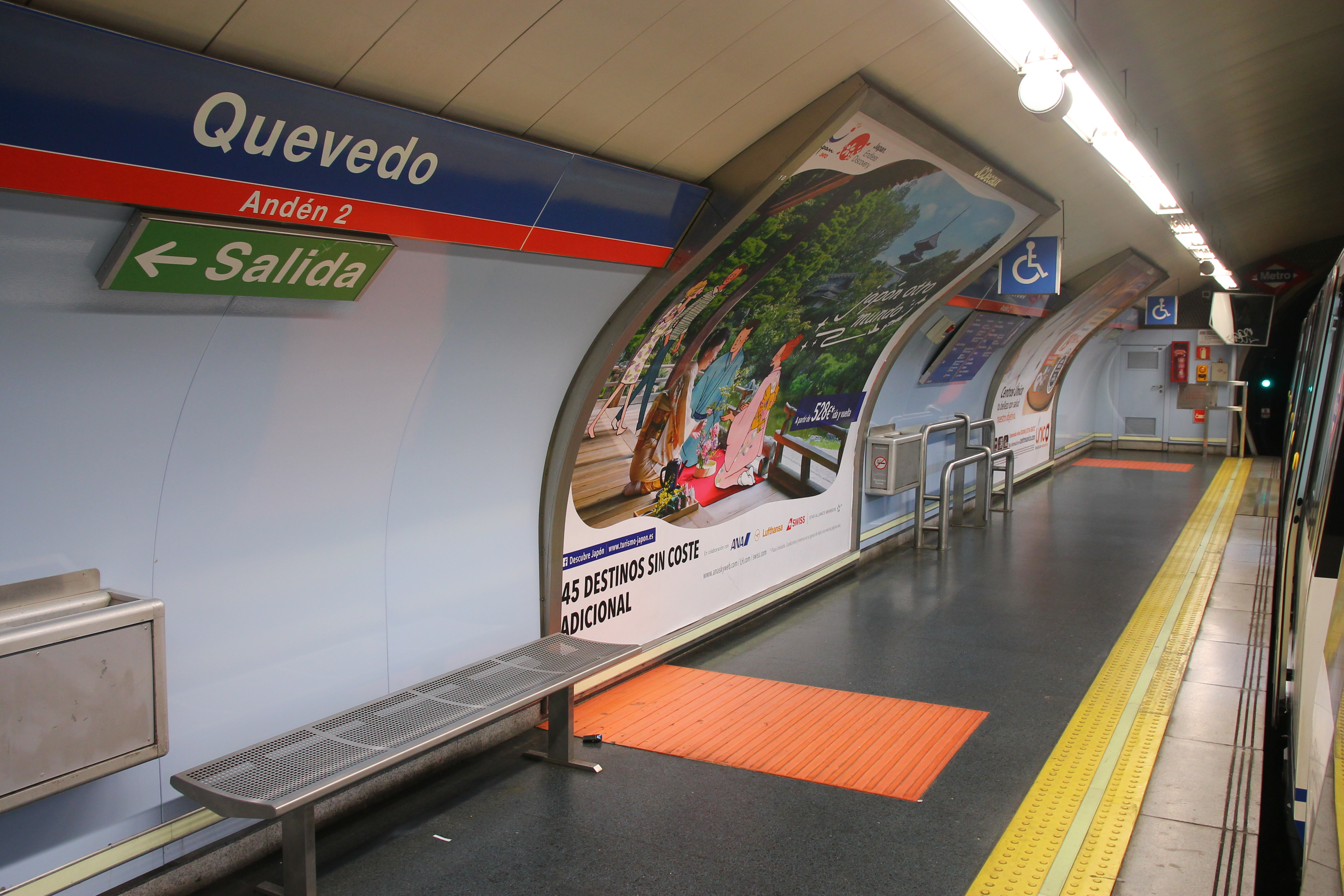

General information
- Location: Chamberí, Madrid; Spain
- Coordinates: 40.4332213°N 3.7043352°W
- System: Madrid Metro station
- Owner: CRTM
- Operator: CRTM

Construction
- Structure type: Underground
- Accessible: No

Other information
- Fare zone: A

History
- Opened: 21 October 1925; 100 years ago

Services
Preceding station	Madrid Metro	Following station
San Bernardo towards Las Rosas	Line 2	Canal towards Cuatro Caminos
Location
- Location within Madrid

Quevedo [keˈβeðo] is a station of Line 2 of the Madrid Metro. It is named after Francisco de Quevedo, a Spanish writer.

== History ==
The station was opened on 9 October 1929 on Line 2.
