= Goya (Madrid Metro) =

Madrid Metro station

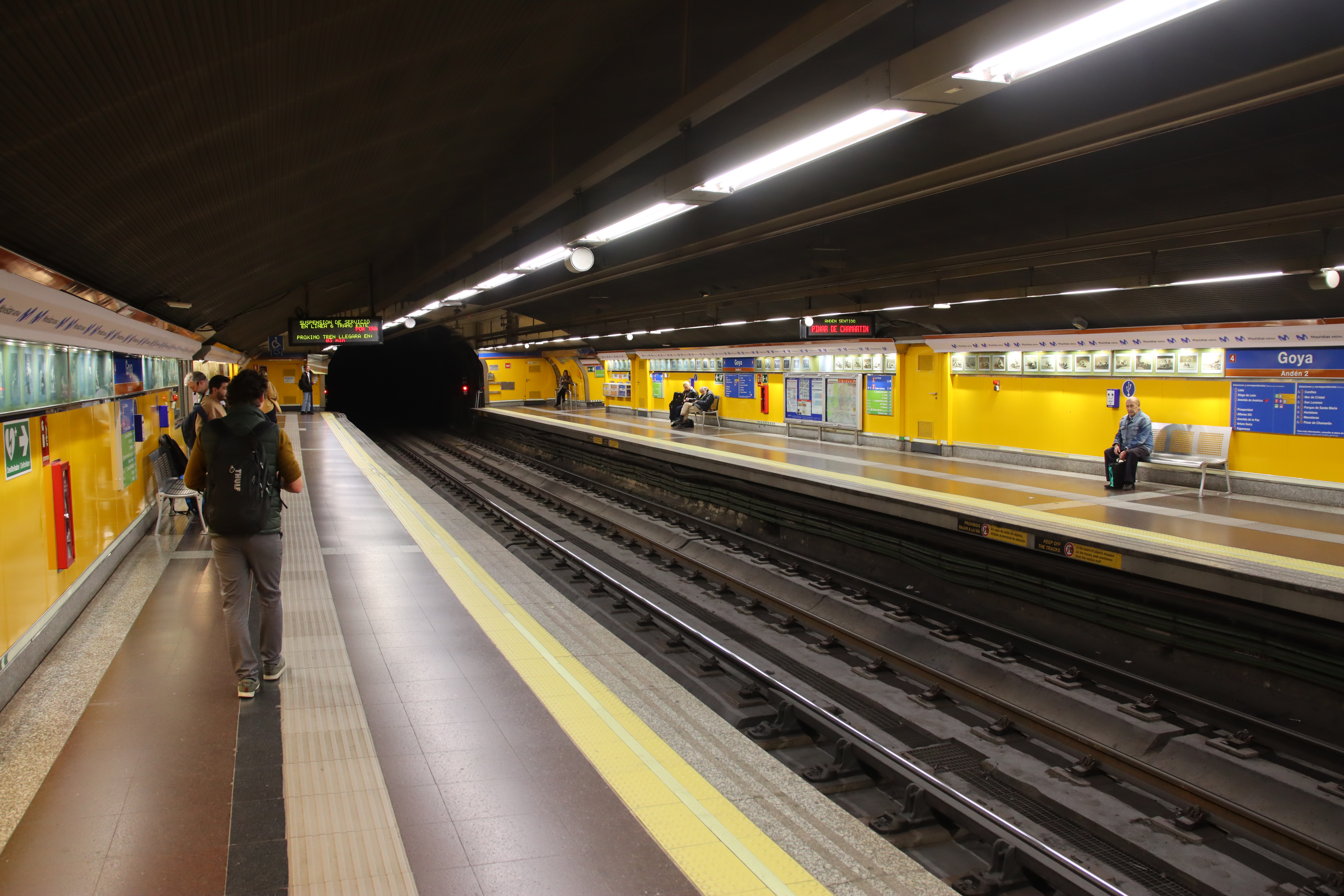
- Platforms of the station

General information
- Location: Salamanca, Madrid; Spain
- Coordinates: 40.4250659°N 3.6743144°W
- System: Madrid Metro station
- Owner: CRTM
- Operator: CRTM

Construction
- Structure type: Underground
- Accessible: Yes

Other information
- Fare zone: A

History
- Opened: 14 June 1924; 102 years ago

Services
Preceding station	Madrid Metro	Following station
Manuel Becerra towards Las Rosas	Line 2	Príncipe de Vergara towards Cuatro Caminos
Velázquez towards Argüelles	Line 4	Lista towards Pinar de Chamartín
Location
- Location within Madrid

Goya [ˈɡoʝa] is a station on Line 2 and Line 4 of the Madrid Metro. It is named for the painter Francisco Goya (1746–1828).
