= Lista (Madrid Metro) =

Madrid Metro station

- Platform of the station

General information
- Location: Salamanca, Madrid; Spain
- Coordinates: 40.4291685°N 3.6754098°W
- System: Madrid Metro station
- Owner: CRTM
- Operator: CRTM

Construction
- Structure type: Underground

Other information
- Fare zone: A

History
- Opened: 17 September 1932; 94 years ago

Services
Preceding station	Madrid Metro	Following station
Goya towards Argüelles	Line 4	Diego de León towards Pinar de Chamartín
Location
- Location within Madrid

Lista [ˈlista] is a station on Line 4 of the Madrid Metro. It is located in fare Zone A. It got its name from the street above, that was called Calle de Lista, which was formerly named for the poet and educationalist Alberto Lista (1775–1848); in 1955 the street was renamed for the philosopher José Ortega y Gasset but the station kept its old name.
