= Alonso Cano (Madrid Metro) =

Madrid Metro station

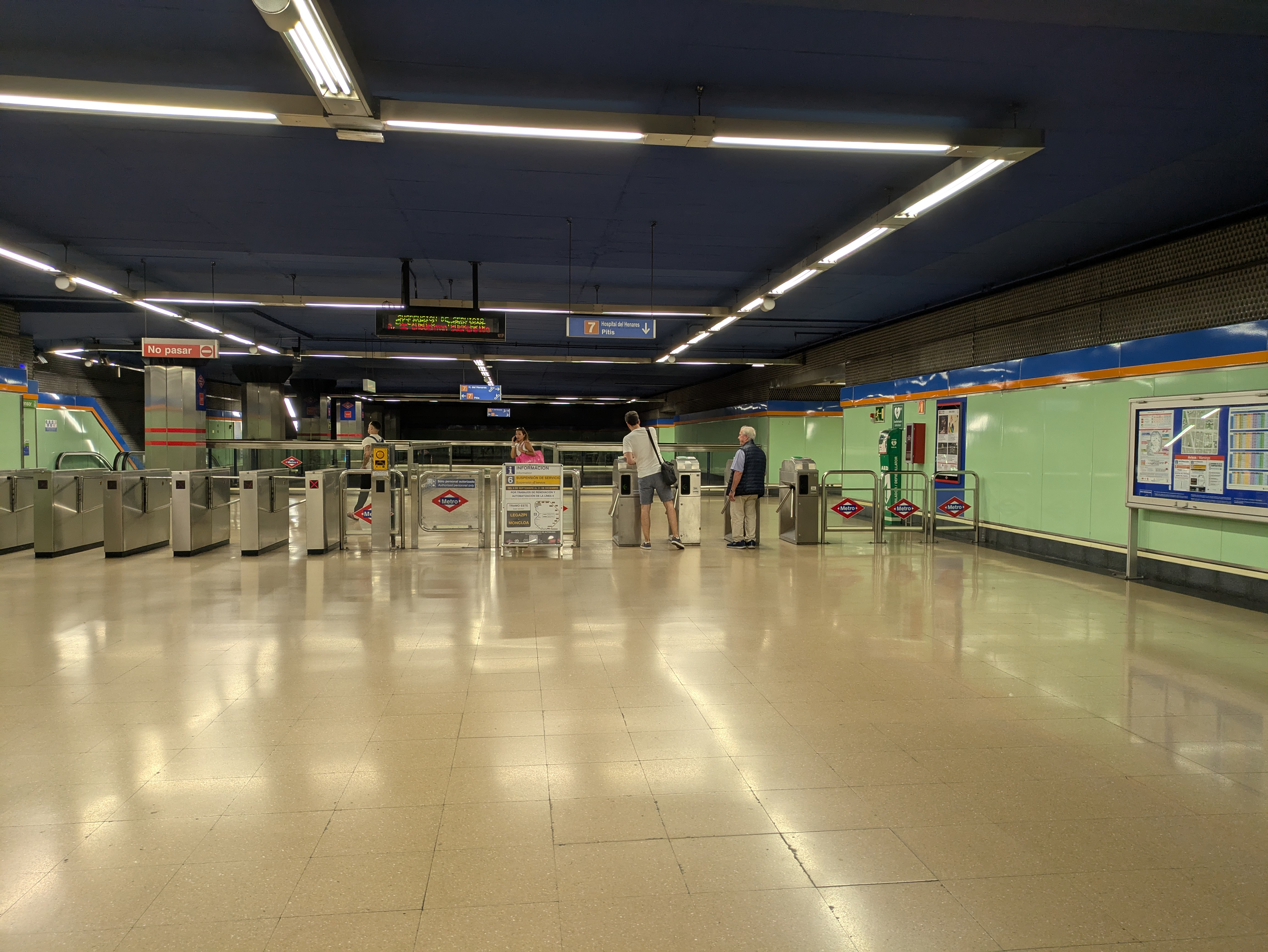

General information
- Location: Chamberí, Madrid; Spain
- Coordinates: 40.4383784°N 3.6992483°W
- System: Madrid Metro station
- Owner: CRTM
- Operator: CRTM

Construction
- Accessible: yes

Other information
- Fare zone: A

History
- Opened: 16 October 1998; 27 years ago

Services
Preceding station	Madrid Metro	Following station
Gregorio Marañón towards Hospital del Henares	Line 7	Canal towards Pitis
Location
- Location within Madrid

Alonso Cano [aˈlonso ˈkano] is a station on Line 7 of the Madrid Metro. It is located in fare Zone A.

While this station is situated relatively close to Iglesia station on Line 1, there is no interchange between the two stations.

The station is named for the painter, architect and sculptor Alonso Cano (1601–1667).
