= Colón (Madrid Metro) =

Madrid Metro station

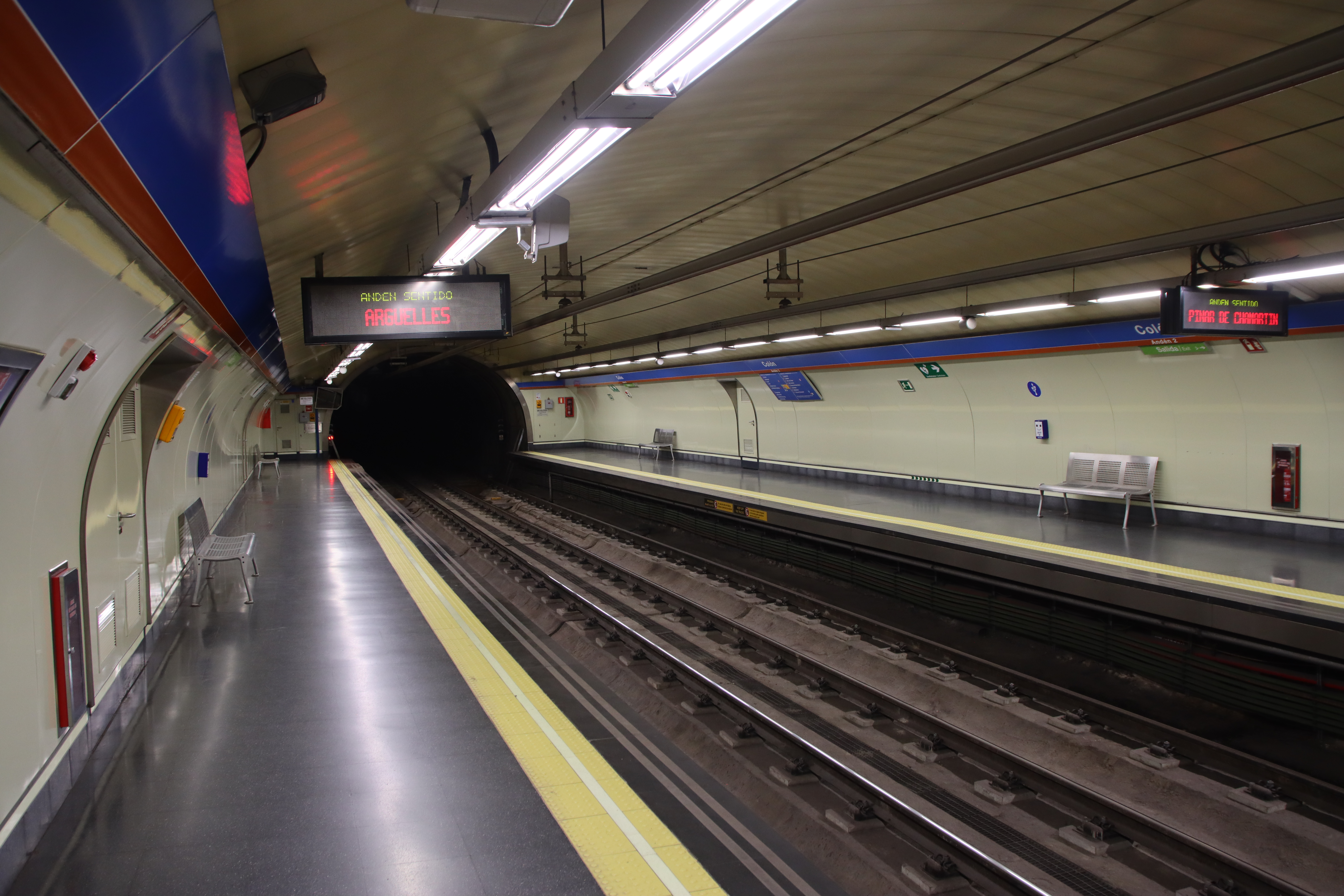

General information
- Location: Centro / Chamberí, Madrid; Spain
- Coordinates: 40.4254188°N 3.6910038°W
- System: Madrid Metro station
- Owner: CRTM
- Operator: CRTM

Construction
- Structure type: Underground
- Accessible: No

Other information
- Fare zone: A

History
- Opened: 23 March 1944; 82 years ago

Services
Preceding station	Madrid Metro	Following station
Alonso Martínez towards Argüelles	Line 4	Serrano towards Pinar de Chamartín
Location
- Location within Madrid

Colón ([koˈlon], Spanish for "Columbus") is a station on Line 4 of the Madrid Metro, located under the Monument to Columbus. It is located in fare Zone A.
