= Velázquez (Madrid Metro) =

Madrid Metro station

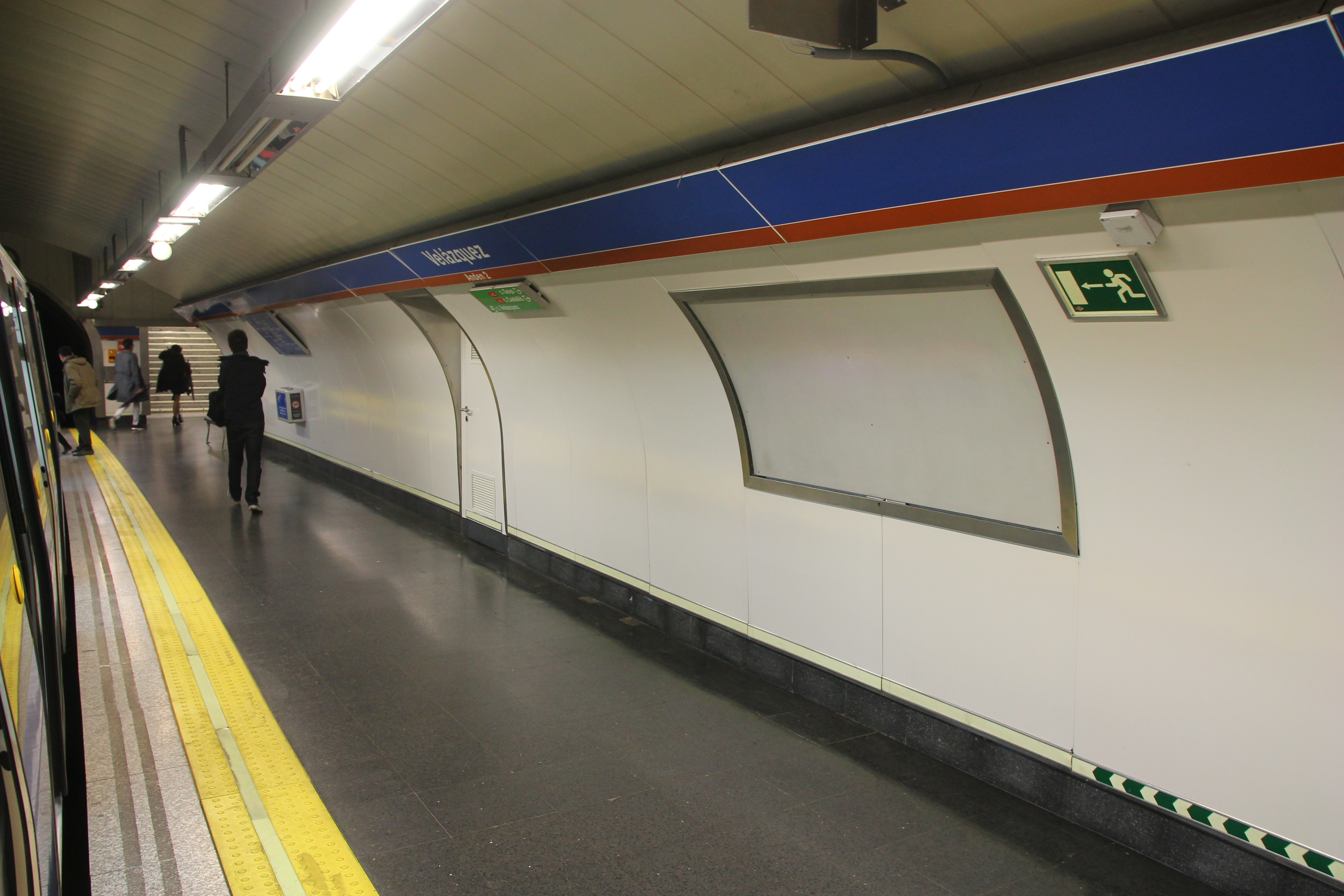

General information
- Location: Salamanca, Madrid; Spain
- Coordinates: 40.4250344°N 3.6829131°W
- System: Madrid Metro station
- Owner: CRTM
- Operator: CRTM

Construction
- Structure type: Underground
- Accessible: No

Other information
- Fare zone: A

History
- Opened: 23 March 1944; 82 years ago

Services
Preceding station	Madrid Metro	Following station
Serrano towards Argüelles	Line 4	Goya towards Pinar de Chamartín
Location
- Location within Madrid

Velázquez [beˈlaθ.keθ] is a station on Line 4 of the Madrid Metro, located near the Calle de Velázquez. It is located in fare Zone A.

== History ==
The station opened to the public on 23 March 1944. It was built as part of the extension of Line 4 between Argüelles and Goya.
