= Alonso Martínez (Madrid Metro) =

Madrid Metro station

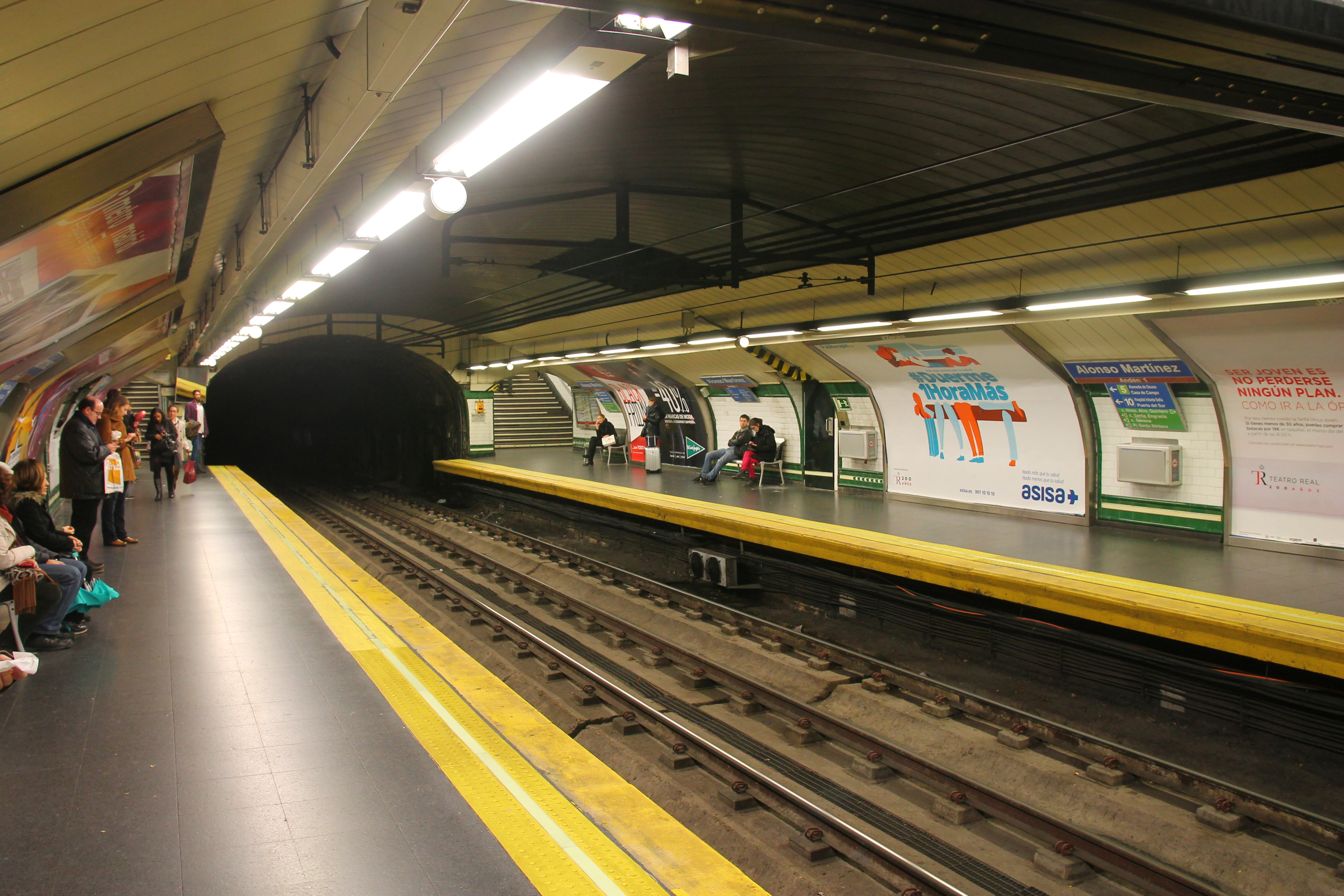
- Line 4 platforms

General information
- Location: Centro / Chamberí, Madrid; Spain
- Coordinates: 40.4277226°N 3.6959433°W
- System: Madrid Metro station
- Owner: CRTM
- Operator: CRTM

Construction
- Structure type: Underground
- Accessible: No

Other information
- Fare zone: A

History
- Opened: 23 March 1944; 82 years ago

Services
Preceding station	Madrid Metro	Following station
Bilbao towards Argüelles	Line 4	Colón towards Pinar de Chamartín
Rubén Darío towards Alameda de Osuna	Line 5	Chueca towards Casa de Campo
Gregorio Marañón towards Hospital Infanta Sofía	Line 10	Tribunal towards Puerta del Sur
Location
- Location within Madrid

Alonso Martínez [aˈlonso maɾˈtineθ] is a station on Line 4, Line 5 and Line 10 of the Madrid Metro. It is located in Zone A.

The station is under the Plaza de Alonso Martínez, named after the Spanish jurist and politician Manuel Alonso Martínez.
