= El Carmen (Madrid Metro) =

Madrid Metro station

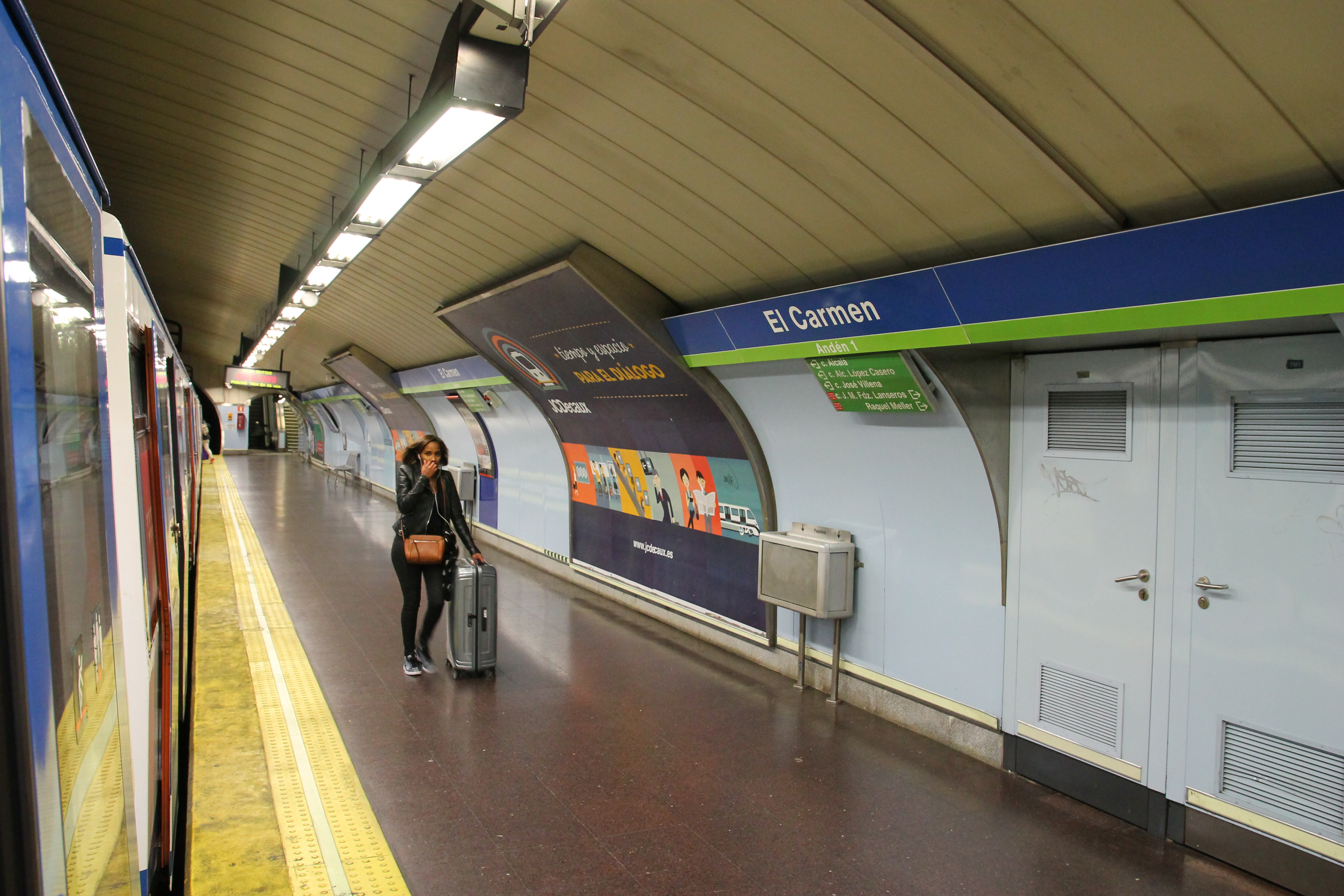
- Platform of the station

General information
- Location: Ciudad Lineal, Madrid; Spain
- Coordinates: 40.4318928°N 3.6575758°W
- System: Madrid Metro station
- Owner: CRTM
- Operator: CRTM
- Line: 5

Construction
- Accessible: No

Other information
- Fare zone: A

History
- Opened: 28 May 1964

Services
Preceding station	Madrid Metro	Following station
Quintana towards Alameda de Osuna	Line 5	Ventas towards Casa de Campo
Location
- Location within Madrid

El Carmen [el ˈkaɾmen] is a station on Line 5 of the Madrid Metro. It is located in fare Zone A.
