= Ventura Rodríguez (Madrid Metro) =

Madrid Metro station

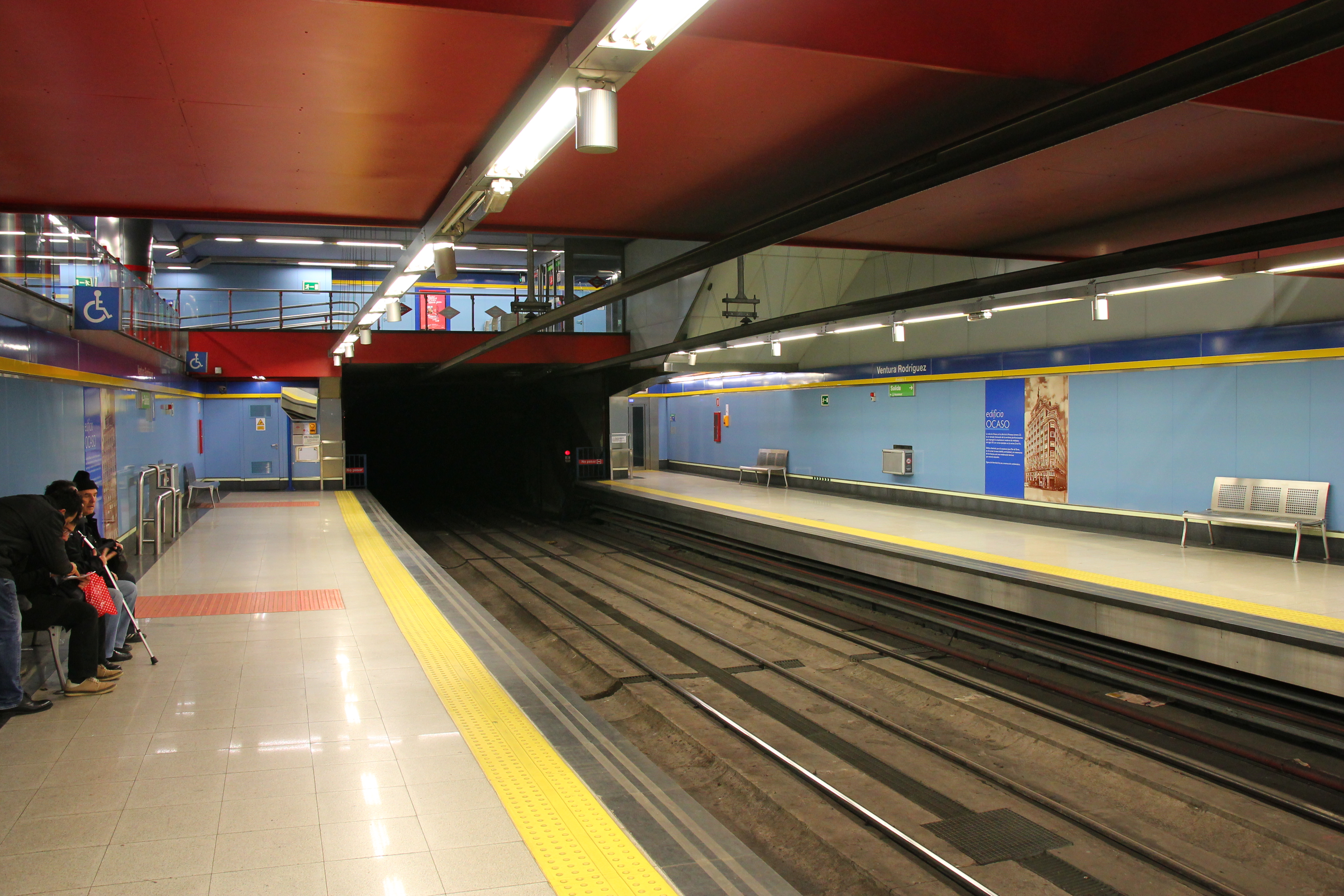

General information
- Location: Centro / Moncloa-Aravaca, Madrid; Spain
- Coordinates: 40.4270848°N 3.7134076°W
- System: Madrid Metro station
- Owner: CRTM
- Operator: CRTM

Construction
- Structure type: Underground
- Accessible: Yes

Other information
- Fare zone: A

History
- Opened: 15 July 1941; 85 years ago

Services
Preceding station	Madrid Metro	Following station
Plaza de España towards El Casar	Line 3	Argüelles towards Moncloa
Location
- Location within Madrid

Ventura Rodríguez [benˈtuɾa roˈðɾiɣeθ] is a station on Line 3 of the Madrid Metro. It is located in fare Zone A. Its name is taken from the Calle de Ventura Rodríguez, which is named for the architect and artist Ventura Rodríguez (1717–1785).
