= Alvarado (Madrid Metro) =

Madrid Metro station

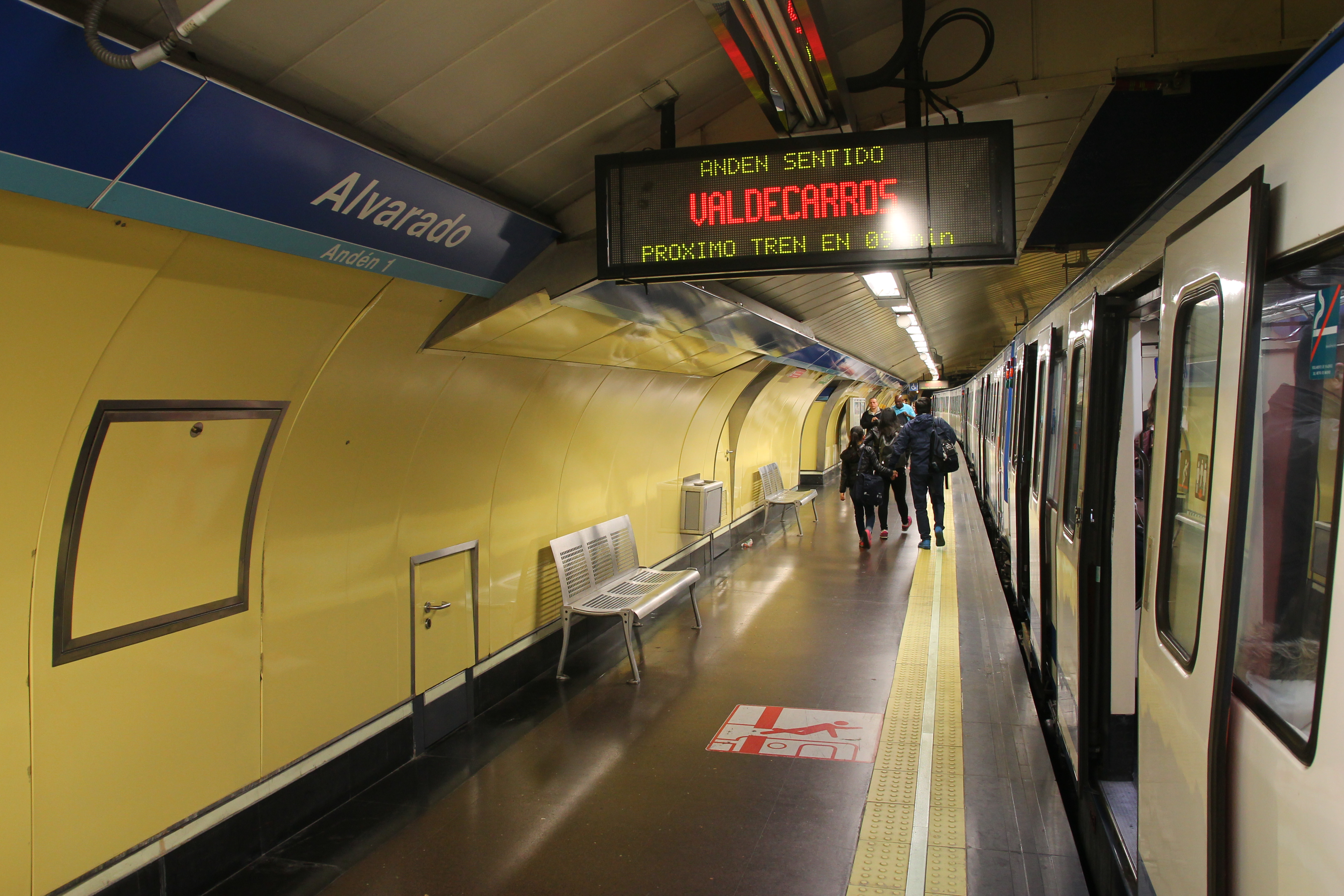
- Platform of the station

General information
- Location: Tetuán, Madrid; Spain
- Coordinates: 40.4503359°N 3.7033108°W
- System: Madrid Metro station
- Owner: CRTM
- Operator: CRTM

Construction
- Structure type: Underground
- Accessible: No

Other information
- Fare zone: A

History
- Opened: 3 June 1929; 97 years ago

Services
Preceding station	Madrid Metro	Following station
Estrecho towards Pinar de Chamartín	Line 1	Cuatro Caminos towards Valdecarros
Location
- Location within Madrid

Alvarado [alβaˈɾaðo] is a station on Line 1 of the Madrid Metro which opened on 3 June 1929. It is located in Zone A. It is named for the Calle de Alvarado, named in turn for Pedro de Alvarado.
