= Serrano (Madrid Metro) =

Madrid Metro station

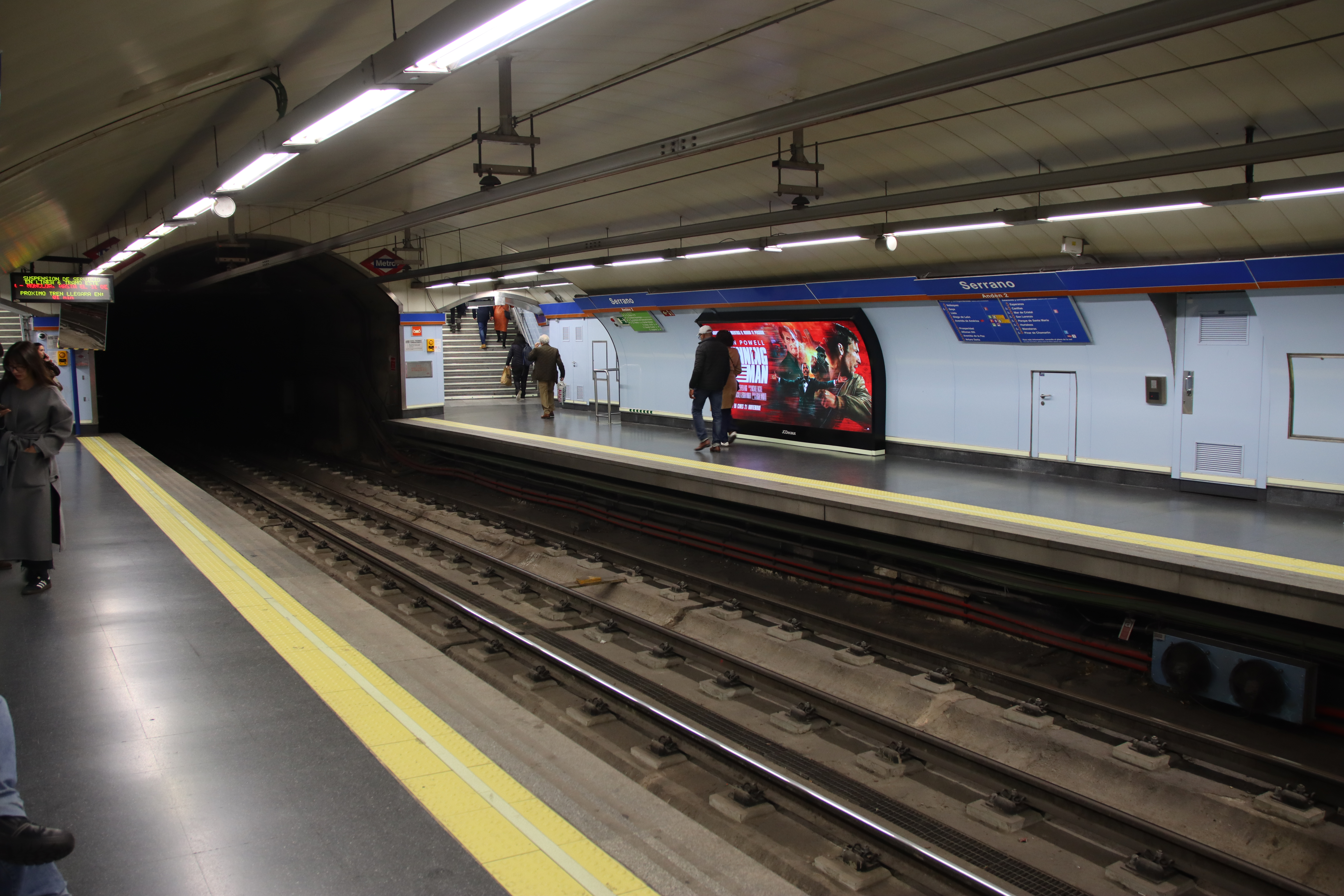
- Platforms of the station

General information
- Location: Salamanca, Madrid; Spain
- Coordinates: 40.4254357°N 3.6866306°W
- System: Madrid Metro station
- Owner: CRTM
- Operator: CRTM

Construction
- Structure type: Underground
- Accessible: No

Other information
- Fare zone: A

History
- Opened: 23 March 1944; 82 years ago

Services
Preceding station	Madrid Metro	Following station
Colón towards Argüelles	Line 4	Velázquez towards Pinar de Chamartín
Location
- Location within Madrid

Serrano [seˈra.no] is a station on Line 4 of the Madrid Metro, located near the Calle de Serrano. It is located in fare Zone A.
