= Gregorio Marañón (Madrid Metro) =

Madrid Metro station

- Platforms of the station of the line 10

General information
- Location: Chamberí / Chamartín, Madrid; Spain
- Coordinates: 40.4382539°N 3.6914888°W
- System: Madrid Metro station
- Owner: CRTM
- Operator: CRTM

Construction
- Accessible: yes

Other information
- Fare zone: A

History
- Opened: 22 January 1998; 28 years ago

Services
Preceding station	Madrid Metro	Following station
Avenida de América towards Hospital del Henares	Line 7	Alonso Cano towards Pitis
Nuevos Ministerios towards Hospital Infanta Sofía	Line 10	Alonso Martínez towards Puerta del Sur
Location
- Location within Madrid

Gregorio Marañón [ɡɾeˈɣoɾjo maɾaˈɲon] is a station on Line 7 and Line 10 of the Madrid Metro, located under the Plaza de Gregorio Marañón, named for the scientist and writer Gregorio Marañón (1887–1960). It is located in fare Zone A.
