= Canal (Madrid Metro) =

Madrid Metro station

- Platforms of the station of the line 7

General information
- Location: Chamberí, Madrid; Spain
- Coordinates: 40.4384107°N 3.7043304°W
- System: Madrid Metro station
- Owner: CRTM
- Operator: CRTM

Construction
- Structure type: Underground
- Accessible: Yes

Other information
- Fare zone: A

History
- Opened: 16 October 1998; 27 years ago

Services
Preceding station	Madrid Metro	Following station
Quevedo towards Las Rosas	Line 2	Cuatro Caminos Terminus
Alonso Cano towards Hospital del Henares	Line 7	Islas Filipinas towards Pitis
Location
- Location within Madrid

Canal (Spanish pronunciation: [kaˈnal]) is a station on Line 2 and Line 7 of the Madrid Metro. It is located in fare Zone A.

The name of the station refers to Madrid's water company, the Canal de Isabel II which has offices and water supply infrastructure nearby.

== History ==
The Canal station opened on 16 October 1998 as part of both Line 2 and Line 7.
