= Islas Filipinas (Madrid Metro) =

Madrid Metro station

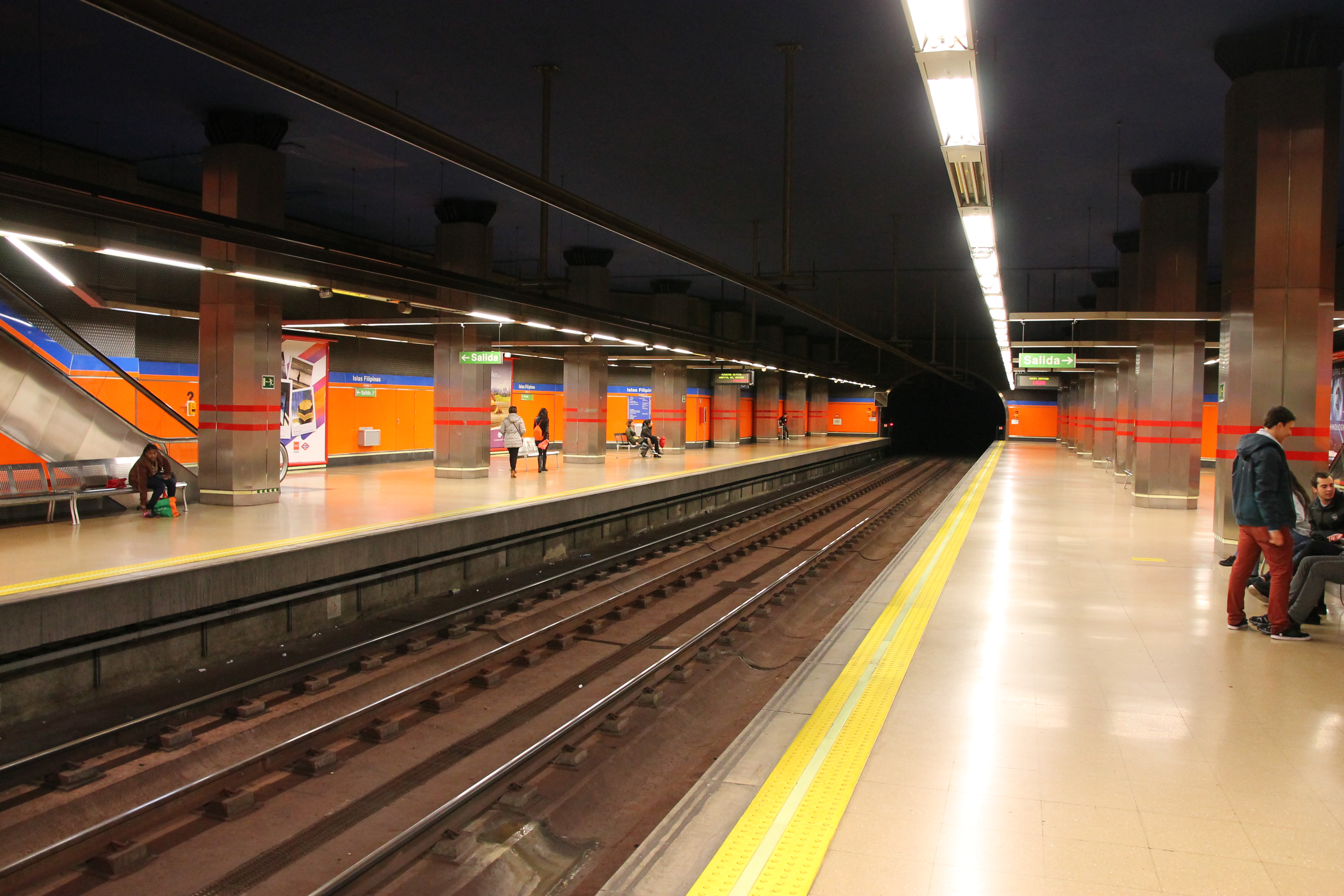

General information
- Location: Chamberí, Madrid; Spain
- Coordinates: 40.4390648°N 3.7137345°W
- System: Madrid Metro station
- Owner: CRTM
- Operator: CRTM

Construction
- Accessible: yes

Other information
- Fare zone: A

History
- Opened: 12 February 1999; 27 years ago

Services
Preceding station	Madrid Metro	Following station
Canal towards Hospital del Henares	Line 7	Guzmán el Bueno towards Pitis
Location
- Location within Madrid

Islas Filipinas ([ˈis.las fi.liˈpi.nas], "Philippine Islands") is a station on Line 7 of the Madrid Metro, located near the Avenida de Filipinas. It is located in Zone A.
