= Pacífico (Madrid Metro) =

Madrid Metro station

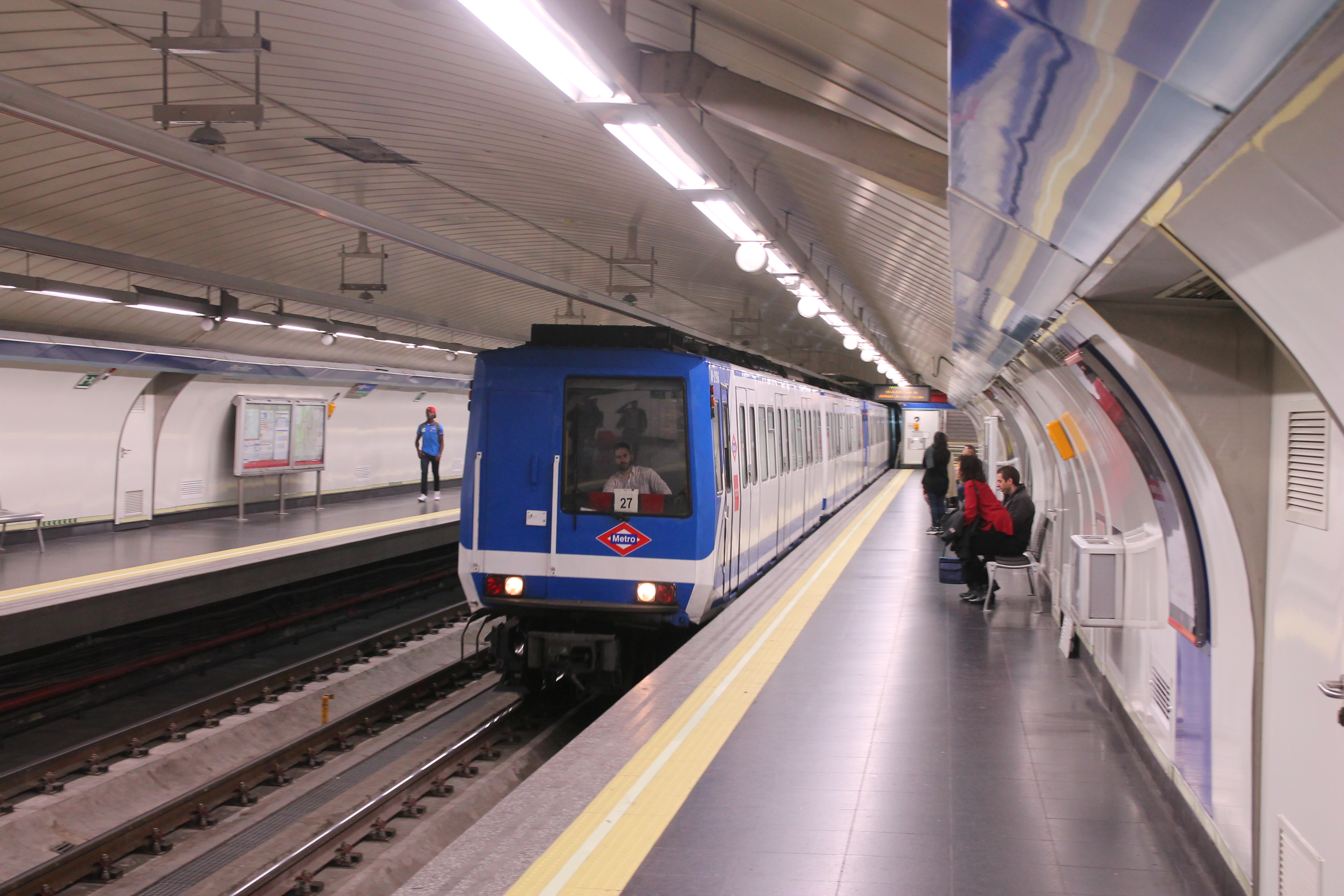
- Platforms of the station

General information
- Location: Retiro, Madrid; Spain
- Coordinates: 40.40126°N 3.6751312°W
- System: Madrid Metro station
- Owner: CRTM
- Operator: CRTM

Construction
- Structure type: Underground
- Accessible: Yes

Other information
- Fare zone: A

History
- Opened: 8 May 1923; 103 years ago

Services
Preceding station	Madrid Metro	Following station
Menéndez Pelayo towards Pinar de Chamartín	Line 1	Puente de Vallecas towards Valdecarros
Méndez Álvaro clockwise / outer	Line 6	Conde de Casal anticlockwise / inner
Location
- Location within Madrid

Pacífico [paˈθi.fi.ko] is a station on Line 1 and Line 6 of the Madrid Metro. It is located in Zone A. It has been open to the public since 8 May 1923. On 10 November 1979 it was added to Line 6.

The Nave de motores de Pacífico, an old power station previously used for powering the Metro, is nearby.
