= Plaza de España (Madrid Metro) =

Madrid Metro station

- Platforms of the station of the Line 3

General information
- Location: Centro / Moncloa-Aravaca, Madrid; Spain
- Coordinates: 40.4234°N 3.71123°W
- System: Madrid Metro station
- Owner: CRTM
- Operator: CRTM

Construction
- Structure type: Underground

Other information
- Fare zone: A

History
- Opened: 15 July 1941; 85 years ago 4 February 1961; 65 years ago

Services
| Preceding station | Madrid Metro | Following station |
|---|---|---|
| Callao towards El Casar | Line 3 | Ventura Rodríguez towards Moncloa |
| Tribunal towards Hospital Infanta Sofía | Line 10 | Príncipe Pío towards Puerta del Sur |
Location
- Location within Madrid

Plaza de España [ˈplaθa ðe esˈpaɲa] is a station on the Madrid Metro. It’s served by Line 3 and Line 10. It is located in fare Zone A. It is named after the Plaza de España square.
