= Cuatro Caminos (Madrid Metro) =

Madrid Metro station

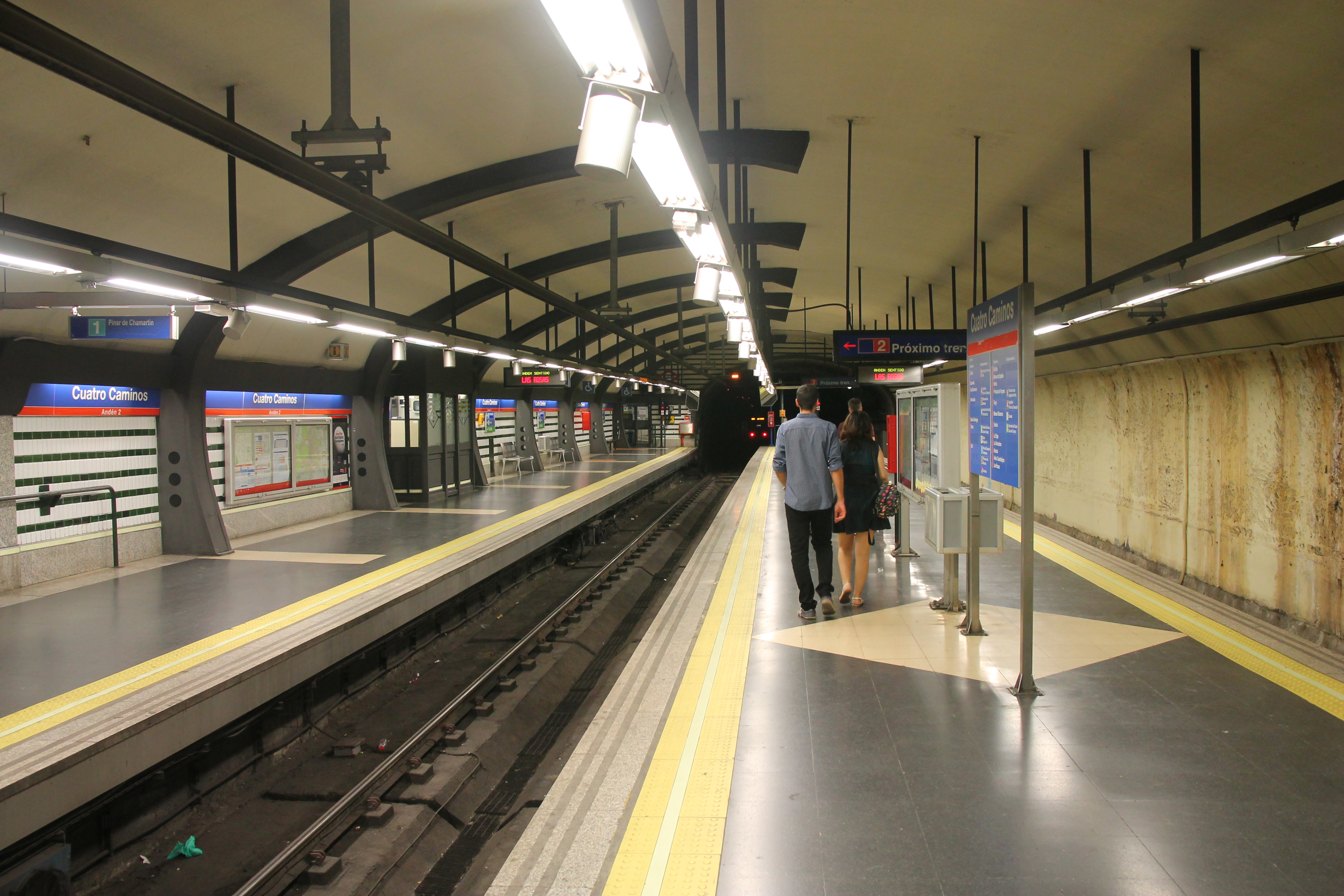
- Line 2 platforms at Cuatro Caminos

General information
- Location: Chamberí / Tetuán, Madrid; Spain
- Coordinates: 40.4469716°N 3.7039697°W
- System: Madrid Metro station
- Owner: CRTM
- Operator: CRTM

Construction
- Structure type: Underground
- Accessible: Yes

Other information
- Fare zone: A

History
- Opened: 17 October 1919; 107 years ago

Services
Preceding station	Madrid Metro	Following station
Alvarado towards Pinar de Chamartín	Line 1	Ríos Rosas towards Valdecarros
Canal towards Las Rosas	Line 2	Terminus
Nuevos Ministerios clockwise / outer	Line 6	Guzmán el Bueno anticlockwise / inner
Location
- Location within Madrid

Cuatro Caminos [ˈkwatɾo kaˈminos] is a station on Line 1, Line 2 and Line 6 of the Madrid Metro, located underneath the Cuatro Caminos ("Four Ways") roundabout on the border of Chamberí and Tetuán districts in Madrid. It is located in fare Zone A. The station was inaugurated on 17 October 1919, and was opened to the public on 31 October 1919.

The station is the deepest in the Madrid Metro system, with its Line 6 platforms located 45 m (148 ft) below street level. However, in terms of absolute elevation above sea level, it is not the lowest, as there are other Line 6 stations with platforms at a lower elevation.

== History ==
Cuatro Caminos is one of the first eight stations in the Madrid Metro system, opening on 17 October 1919 when King Alfonso XIII inaugurated Line 1, which initially ran from Sol to Cuatro Caminos. The Line 1 platforms were originally 60 m (200 ft) long, and were extended to 90 m (300 ft) in the 1960s. They are located underneath Santa Engracia street close to the roundabout. On 6 March 1929, Line 1 was extended to Cuatro Caminos to Tetuán, and as a result Cuatro Caminos was no longer a terminus.

The Line 2 platforms were inaugurated on 10 September 1929 when Line 2 was extended from Quevedo to Cuatro Caminos, making it a Line 2 terminus. Line 2 has a central platform and one side platform, both 60 m (200 ft) long, and is only one of three stations in the network with this configuration. The platforms are located underneath Bravo Murillo street south of the roundabout at the same depth as the Line 1 platforms.

The Line 6 platforms entered into service on 10 October 1979 when the first segment of Line 6 was inaugurated, running from Cuatro Caminos to Pacífico. On 13 January 1987, Line 6 was extended from Cuatro Caminos to Ciudad Universitaria. The platforms are the deepest in the system, and are located beneath Raimundo Fernández Villaverde street east of the roundabout.

In 2004–2005, an underpass was constructed for automotive traffic underneath the roundabout, replacing a previous overpass. The tunnel was built in the free space between Lines 1 and 2 and Line 6, which had previously been left empty in case the Metro decided to connect a fourth line to the station.

Between 3 July and 13 November 2016, Line 1 was closed for renovations between Plaza de Castilla and Sierra de Guadalupe, a segment that included Cuatro Caminos. Renovations included tunnel repairs, cleaning, and waterproofing, the installation of rigid overhead lines, and other work. Starting 14 September 2016, Cuatro Caminos was temporarily used as a terminus for Line 1 when service was reestablished between the station and Plaza de la Castilla. Line 1 service was fully restored on 13 November.
