= Las Rosas (Madrid Metro) =

Madrid Metro station

General information
- Location: San Blas, Madrid; Spain
- Coordinates: 40.4237466°N 3.6033063°W
- System: Madrid Metro station
- Owner: CRTM
- Operator: CRTM

Construction
- Structure type: Underground
- Accessible: Yes

Other information
- Fare zone: A

History
- Opened: 16 March 2011; 15 years ago

Services
Preceding station	Madrid Metro	Following station
Terminus	Line 2	Avenida de Guadalajara towards Cuatro Caminos
Location
- Location within Madrid

Las Rosas [las ˈro.sas] is a station on Line 2 of the Madrid Metro in Madrid, Spain. The station is named for the Rosas district. It is located in fare Zone A.
