= Consorcio Regional de Transportes de Madrid =

Spanish public transport autonomous body

Regional Transport Consortium of Madrid
- Consorcio Regional de Transportes de Madrid
- Abbreviation: CRTM
- Formation: May 16, 1985; 40 years ago
- Type: Public body
- Legal status: Organismo autónomo English: Autonomous body
- Purpose: Multi-modal public transport services
- Headquarters: Plaza del Descubridor Diego de Ordás, Madrid, Spain
- Region served: Community of Madrid (Note: It also serves neighbouring parts of the provinces of Guadalajara, Toledo, Cuenca, Ávila and Segovia)
- Services: Metro, light rail, and bus
- President: David Pérez García
- Revenue: 2.598.893.772 (2022)
- Expenses: 2.559.738.319 (2022)
- Website: https://crtm.es

The Consorcio Regional de Transportes de Madrid (CRTM; literally: Regional Consortium of Transportation for Madrid) is an autonomous body created by Spanish law 5/1985 which is tasked with coordinating the public transport operations across multiple providers in the Community of Madrid. It harmonizes fares for commuter rail, rapid transit, light rail and bus transport services provided by entities such as Renfe Cercanías, Metro de Madrid S.A. or the Empresa Municipal de Transportes de Madrid (EMT).

The Consorcio also extends into some councils of the nearby provinces of Toledo, Guadalajara and Cuenca, and, to a lesser extent, to some councils of the provinces of Segovia and Avila.

Its executive board is presided over by the regional minister for transport. The vice-president is a member of the Municipal Council of Madrid. The other board members are six further representatives of the regional government, two more representatives of the Madrid municipal council, three representatives of other municipal councils, two representatives of the State administration, two syndical representatives, two representatives of corporate associations and one representative of consumer associations.

== Intercity buses ==
Intercity transport, i.e. journeys that go between different municipalities in the Madrid region, are operated by the CRTM. The company operates three separate types of lines; (i) daytime lines, (ii) daytime lines with added night service, and (iii) dedicated night lines. The inter-urban night buses (autobuses interurbanos), commonly known as Green Owls (Búhos verdes), travel further afield than the regular N1 to N28 and NC1-NC2 owl buses within Madrid urban core (which are operated by EMT), and connect Madrid with the smaller cities of the periphery. As of June 2022 there are 40 such routes. Green Owl buses are identified by the letter N followed by three numbers (e.g. N101). It has been noted that real-time indicators at bus stops usually display only the number of a route, and not the "N" at the beginning, which can be a cause of confusion for visitors, as the route 101 can have a completely different destination to the route N101 (for example).
