= Puerta del Ángel (Madrid Metro) =

Madrid Metro station

- Platform of the station

General information
- Location: Latina, Madrid; Spain
- Coordinates: 40.4138996°N 3.7272354°W
- System: Madrid Metro station
- Owner: CRTM
- Operator: CRTM

Construction
- Accessible: No

Other information
- Fare zone: A

History
- Opened: 10 May 1995

Services
Preceding station	Madrid Metro	Following station
Príncipe Pío clockwise / outer	Line 6	Alto de Extremadura anticlockwise / inner
Location
- Location within Madrid

Puerta del Ángel (Spanish pronunciation: [ˈpweɾta ðel ˈaŋxel]) is a station on Line 6, located beneath the Paseo de Extremadura near the Puente de Segovia (Bridge of Segovia) in the barrio of Puerta del Ángel ("Angel Gate"). It is located in fare Zone A. The station is named after the Puerta del Ángel neighborhood, which is in turn named after a former access gate to the Casa de Campo park.

== History ==
The station opened to the public on 10 May 1995 when the Line 6 segment between Laguna and Ciudad Universitaria was opened, converting the line into a circular route.

On 10 April 2006, two maintenance trains collided in the station, causing two deaths and two injuries.

Between 4 July 2015 and 13 September 2015, Puerta del Ángel functioned as a temporary terminus for Line 6 when the line was closed between Puerta del Ángel and Oporto for maintenance.
