= Vista Alegre =

Vista Alegre may refer to:

== Places ==
- Vista Alegre crater, a crater in Brazil
- Vista Alegre City, a city in Brazil
- Vista Alegre (Belo Horizonte), a neighbourhood of the Brazilian city of Belo Horizonte
- Vista Alegre (Rio de Janeiro), a neighbourhood of the Brazilian city of Rio de Janeiro
- Vista Alegre (São Paulo), a neighbourhood of the Brazilian city of São Paulo
- Vista Alegre (Curitiba), a neighbourhood of the Brazilian city of Curitiba
- Vista Alegre do Prata, a municipality in the Brazilian state of Rio Grande do Sul
- Vista Alegre do Alto, a municipality in the Brazilian state of São Paulo
- Vista Alegre (Asunción), a neighborhood of Asunción, Paraguay
- Vista Alegre, São Tomé and Príncipe, a settlement of São Tomé Island in São Tomé and Príncipe
- Vista Alegre (Madrid), a ward of Madrid, Spain
  - Vista Alegre (Metro Madrid), a station on Line 5
- Vista Alegre (Uíge), a town and commune in Angola
- Vista Alegre District, a district in Amazonas Region of Peru
- Vista Alegre (Neuquén), a minor city located in Neuquén Province, Argentina
- Vista Alegre, Panama, a corregimiento in Arraiján District, Panama
- Vista Alegre, Darién, a village on the Tuira River, Darién Province, Panama

== Other uses ==
- Vista Alegre (company), a Portuguese ceramics company
