= Carabanchel Alto (Madrid Metro) =

Madrid Metro station

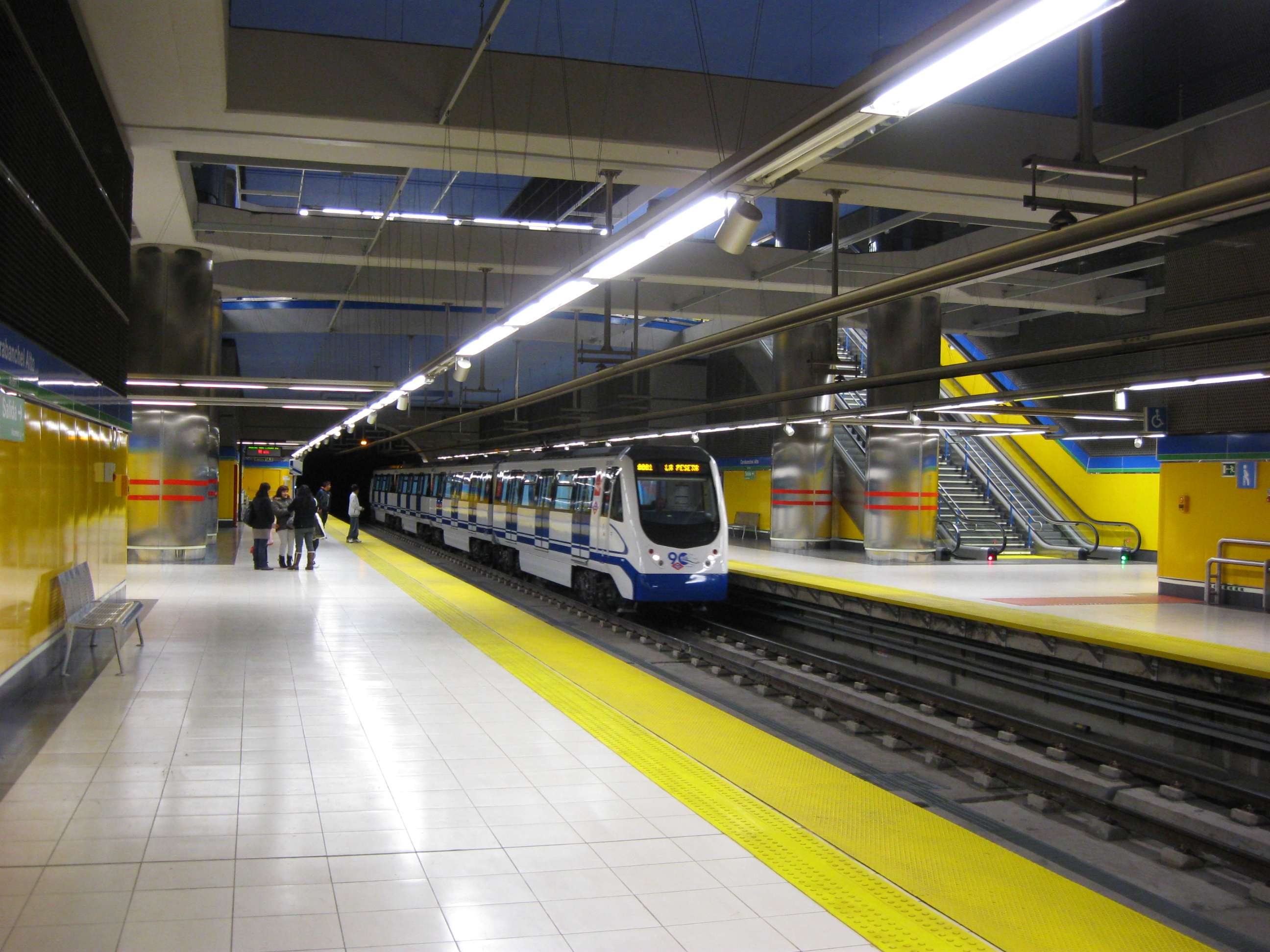

General information
- Location: Carabanchel, Madrid; Spain
- Coordinates: 40.3719641°N 3.751764°W
- System: Madrid Metro station
- Owner: CRTM
- Operator: CRTM

Construction
- Accessible: yes

Other information
- Fare zone: A

History
- Opened: 18 December 2006; 19 years ago

Services
Preceding station	Madrid Metro	Following station
San Francisco towards Plaza Elíptica	Line 11	La Peseta towards La Fortuna
Location
- Location within Madrid

Carabanchel Alto ([kaɾaβanˈtʃel ˈalto], "Upper Carabanchel") is a station on Line 11 of the Madrid Metro. It is located in fare Zone A.
