= Pan Bendito (Madrid Metro) =

Madrid Metro station

- Platform of the station

General information
- Location: Carabanchel, Madrid; Spain
- Coordinates: 40.3758644°N 3.7341656°W
- System: Madrid Metro station
- Owner: CRTM
- Operator: CRTM

Construction
- Accessible: yes

Other information
- Fare zone: A

History
- Opened: 16 November 1998; 27 years ago

Services
Preceding station	Madrid Metro	Following station
Abrantes towards Plaza Elíptica	Line 11	San Francisco towards La Fortuna
Location
- Location within Madrid

Pan Bendito [ˈpam benˈdito] is a station on Line 11 of the Madrid Metro, serving the Pan Bendito barrio. It is located in fare Zone A.
