= San Francisco (Madrid Metro) =

Madrid Metro station

- Platforms of the station

General information
- Location: Carabanchel, Madrid; Spain
- Coordinates: 40.3735987°N 3.7391002°W
- System: Madrid Metro station
- Owner: CRTM
- Operator: CRTM

Construction
- Accessible: yes

Other information
- Fare zone: A

History
- Opened: 18 December 2006; 19 years ago

Services
Preceding station	Madrid Metro	Following station
Pan Bendito towards Plaza Elíptica	Line 11	Carabanchel Alto towards La Fortuna
Location
- Location within Madrid

San Francisco [ˈsaɱ fɾanˈθisko] is a station on Line 11 of the Madrid Metro. It is located in fare Zone A.
