= Kaydy Cain =

Spanish rapper

- Also known as: Daniel Gómez Can and Kaydy Cain
- Born: Daniel Gómez Carrero; 12 February 1990 (age 36); Madrid, Spain
- Genres: Reggaeton; hip hop; trap; Latin
- Occupations: Rapper
- Instruments: roció Aznar trenor
- Years active: 2009–present
- Labels: La Vendición; Avatar Records; Honey Money

Daniel Gómez Carrero (Dani Gómez; born 12 February 1990), known professionally as Kaydy Cain, is a Spanish rapper and former member of the music group Pxxr Gvng (pronounced as poor gang; later known as Los Santos). Also known by being one of the voices of “La Mafia del Amor”. He is recognised for his original style and his contributions to the explosion of the genre trap in Spain.

== Early life ==
Born in the neighbourhood of Opañel in Carabanchel, a district in the south western suburbs of Madrid, Gómez lived a humble life as a teenager. The environment which he calls 'El Barrio', indicating that in the neighbourhood it is normal for 15 to 20 year olds to have to go out to the streets to sell drugs, or whatever is illegal (referring to his lifestyle in adolescence). Thanks to the emergence of the urban genre worldwide, he managed to leave that lifestyle and dedicate himself completely to his passion for music.

== Career ==
Dani Gómez began his artistic journey in the 2010s as a member of the trap group Pxxr Gvng, with which he was able to turn his life around thanks to the popularity that hip hop began to enjoy in Spain, which allowed him to be part of the group's album Los Pobres (2015), before launching his solo career. Influenced by the Atlanta hip hop flair of rappers like Gucci Mane and Waka Flocka Flame, as well as the salsa artist Héctor Lavoe, Gómez has built a massive following with his dynamic mix of hip hop, reggaeton and bachata. All these influences not only keep a strong presence in his beats and in his musical proposals, but they are also part of his personal life since he has several of his icons tattooed on his skin, such as Camarón, Héctor Lavoe, The Notorious B.I.G. or Cano Estremera.

Gómez began to pursue his solo career in 2017. His solo album Calle Amor was released in mid-2017, in which he put trap aside to give way to a more Latin and Caribbean style. The lyrics of the 18 songs of Calle Amor express the street lifestyle, making references to fights, drugs, prostitution, among other details. The music video for 'Perdedores del barrio' was the most watched video clip in Spain at the end of October 2017. Since its release, it has been indicated that the song is a direct attack on the Spanish urban music singer C. Tangana, who precisely at that time was number 1 on the country's streaming charts.

In 2018 Gómez released two singles 'Puro malianteo' and 'No Dreams', which quickly obtained hundreds of views on YouTube. The following year he released two albums, Lo mejor de lo peor and NBA, respectively, which became a massive hit on the music scene in Spain.

== Discography ==
Studio albums

- Life is... (2010)
- Calle Amor (2017)
- Lo mejor de lo peor (2019)
- NBA (with Marko Italia, 2019)

EPs

- Bitches Over Money (2015)
- Money from Nothin' (2016)
- El swing de siempre. Eterno tumbao... (with Cookin' Soul, 2016)
- El Niño de Tus Ojos (2017)
- El Juguete de tu Muñeca (2021)

Singles

- "Puro malianteo" (2018) feat. Los del Control
- "No Dreams" (2018)
- "Algo como tú" (2019)
- "Como yo lo hago" (2020) feat. Zaramay
- "Si no me das tu corazón te lo robo" (2020)
- "Hollywood" (2020)
- "Si Tú Te Vas" (2022) with Khaled and Yung Beef
- "Ping Pong" (2022) with La Zowi and Kabasaki

As featured artist

- 'Culpable' (Rels B feat. Kaydy Cain)
