= Line 11 (Madrid Metro) =

Rapid transit line of the Madrid Metro

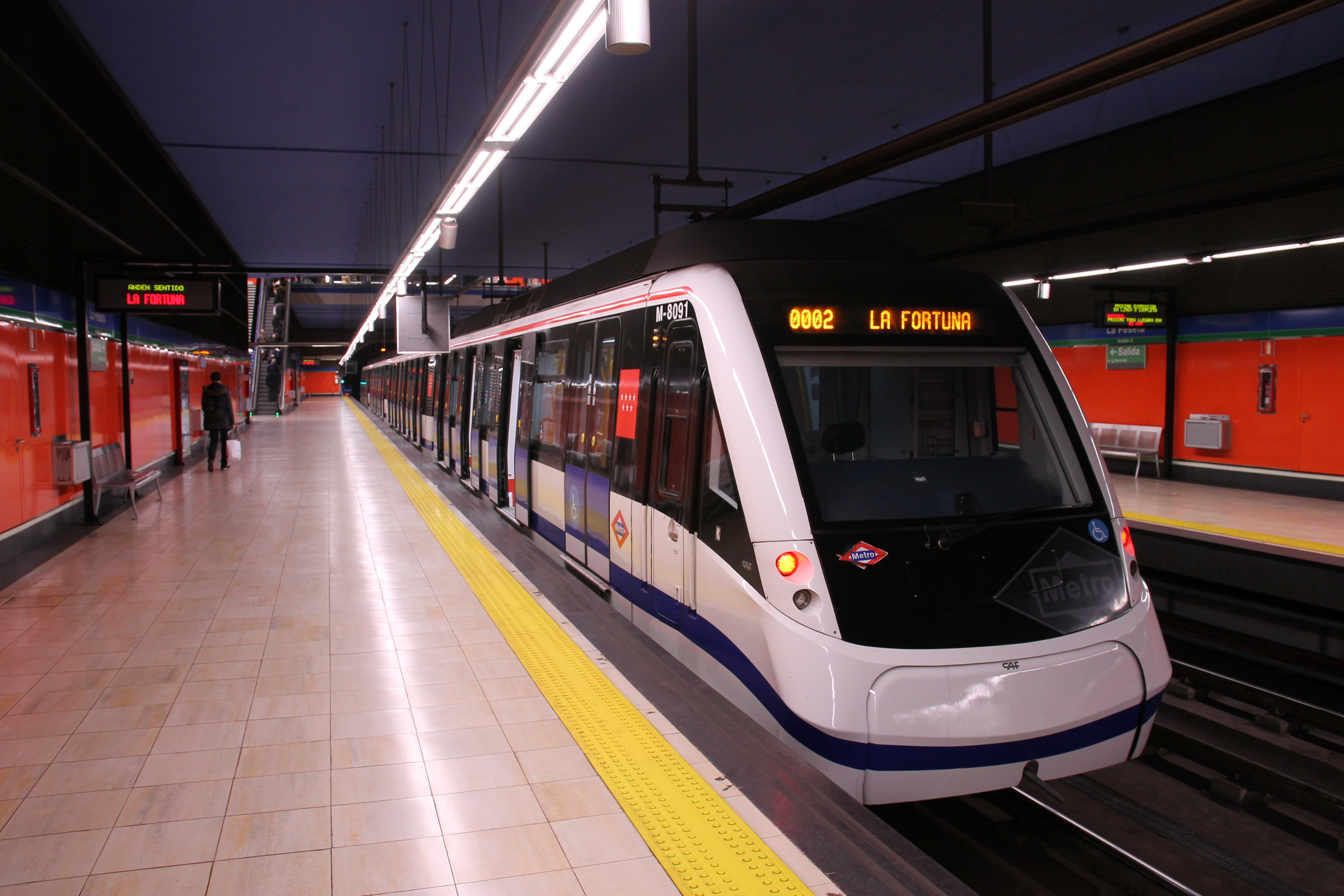
- A Class 8000 train at La Peseta station

Overview
- Native name: Línea 11
- Owner: CRTM
- Locale: Madrid
- Termini: La Fortuna; Plaza Elíptica
- Stations: 7
- Website: www.metromadrid.es/en/linea/linea-11

Service
- Type: Rapid transit
- System: Madrid Metro
- Operator: CRTM
- Rolling stock: CAF 8000

History
- Opened: 16 November 1998; 27 years ago
- Last extension: 2010

Technical
- Line length: 8.5 km (5.3 mi)
- Character: Underground
- Track gauge: 1,445 mm (4 ft 8 7/8 in)

Line 11 of the Madrid Metro is a rapid transit line in Madrid, Spain. The line originally opened between Plaza Elíptica and Pan Bendito on 16 November 1998.

== History ==
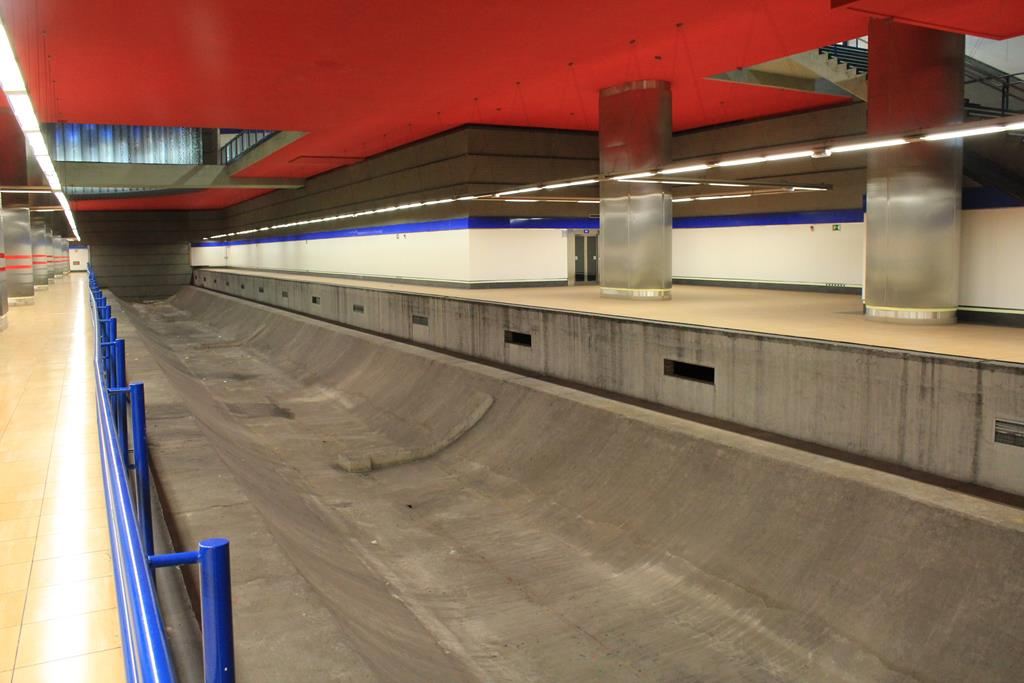
Empty platforms at Chamartín, intended for Line 11 and a possible Line 13

For the line's first eight years of existence, there were just three stations. In 2006 the line was extended from Pan Bendito to La Peseta with two intermediate stations.

In 2010 the line was extended once more to La Fortuna.

== Future ==
Line 11 was projected to ultimately become one of the longest lines in Madrid according to plans of the regional government in 2005.

The project to expand the line north and south was reimagined in 2020. The final form is projected to become a large 'Diagonal' which would connect 11 of the 12 lines of the metro. The new line is expected to extend to the south, to Cuatro Vientos in the south (connecting with Line 10). From the northeast, it will lead through the city centre, connecting all the lines at the East via a semicircular trajectory, then reaching the Barajas Airport and the new Hospital Isabel Zendal (built during the COVID-19 pandemic) and finally ending in the Valdebebas new urban development. It has been pointed out that this expansion would alleviate the comparatively lacking interconnectedness of the outward lines, leading to shorter commutes and a declogging of the often overloaded circular Line 6.

Works on the next section from Plaza Elíptica to Conde de Casal is scheduled to begin in November 2022, with the other sections scheduled to begin construction in 2024. The full extension is scheduled for completion by the second quarter of 2027.

== Rolling stock ==
Line 11 uses four-car trains of CAF class 8000 large rolling stock since the opening of the La Fortuna extension. Before that, the line used class 3000 trainsets.

== Stations ==
Municipality	District	Station	Opened	Zone	Connections
Madrid	Carabanchel	Plaza Elíptica	1981	A	Madrid Metro:
Madrid	Carabanchel	Abrantes	1998	A	
Madrid	Carabanchel	Pan Bendito	1998	A	
Madrid	Carabanchel	San Francisco	2006	A	
Madrid	Carabanchel	Carabanchel Alto	2006	A	
Madrid	Carabanchel	La Peseta	2006	A	
Leganés		La Fortuna	2010	B1	

== See also ==
- Madrid
- Transport in Madrid
- List of Madrid Metro stations
- List of metro systems
