= Opañel (Madrid Metro) =

Madrid Metro station

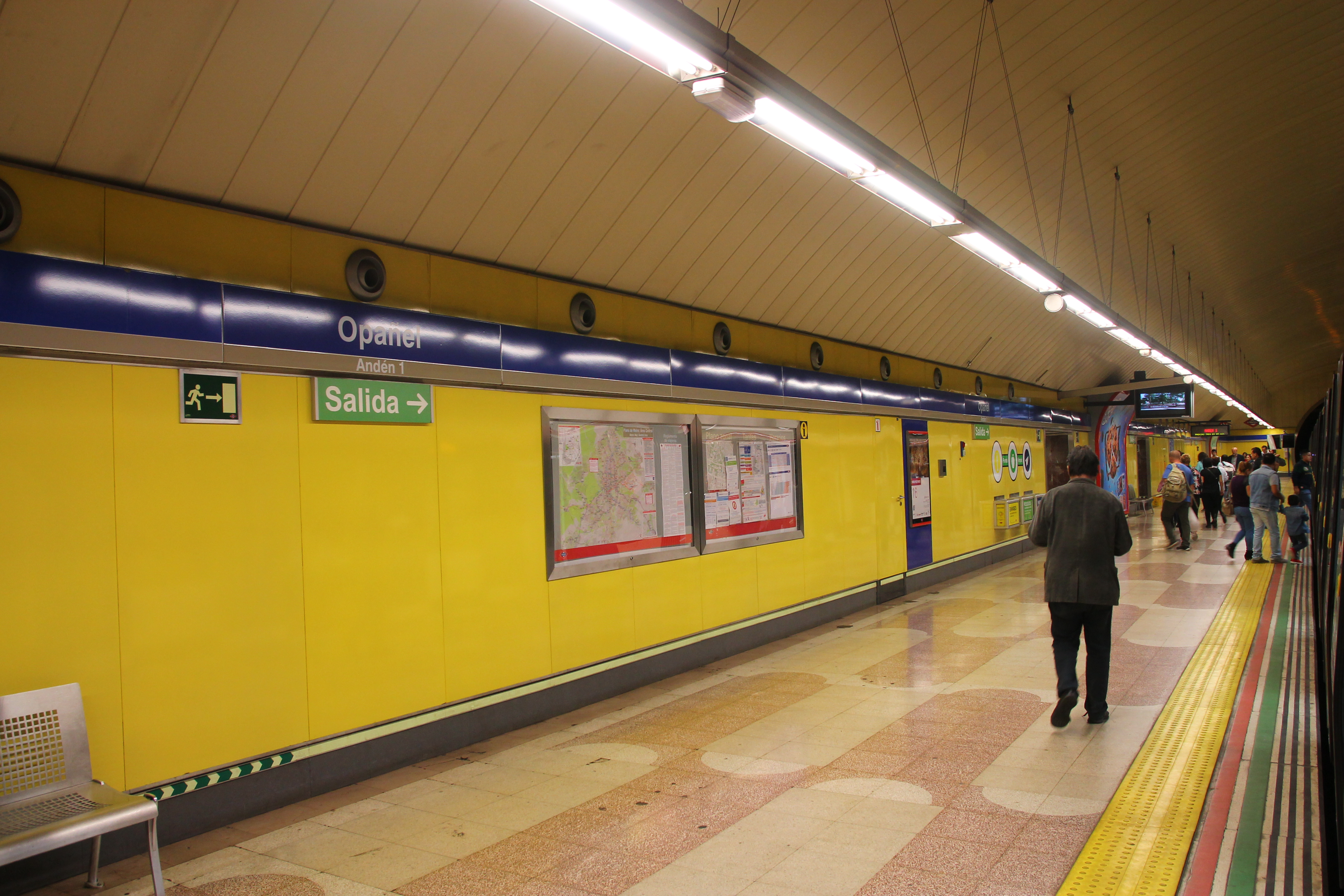
- Platform of the station

General information
- Location: Carabanchel, Madrid; Spain
- Coordinates: 40.3869075°N 3.7231287°W
- System: Madrid Metro station
- Owner: CRTM
- Operator: CRTM

Construction
- Accessible: No

Other information
- Fare zone: A

History
- Opened: 7 May 1981

Services
Preceding station	Madrid Metro	Following station
Oporto clockwise / outer	Line 6	Plaza Elíptica anticlockwise / inner
Location
- Location within Madrid

Opañel [o.paˈɲel] is a station on Line 6 of the Madrid Metro, serving the Opañel barrio. It is located in Zone A.
