= Abrantes (Madrid Metro) =

Madrid Metro station

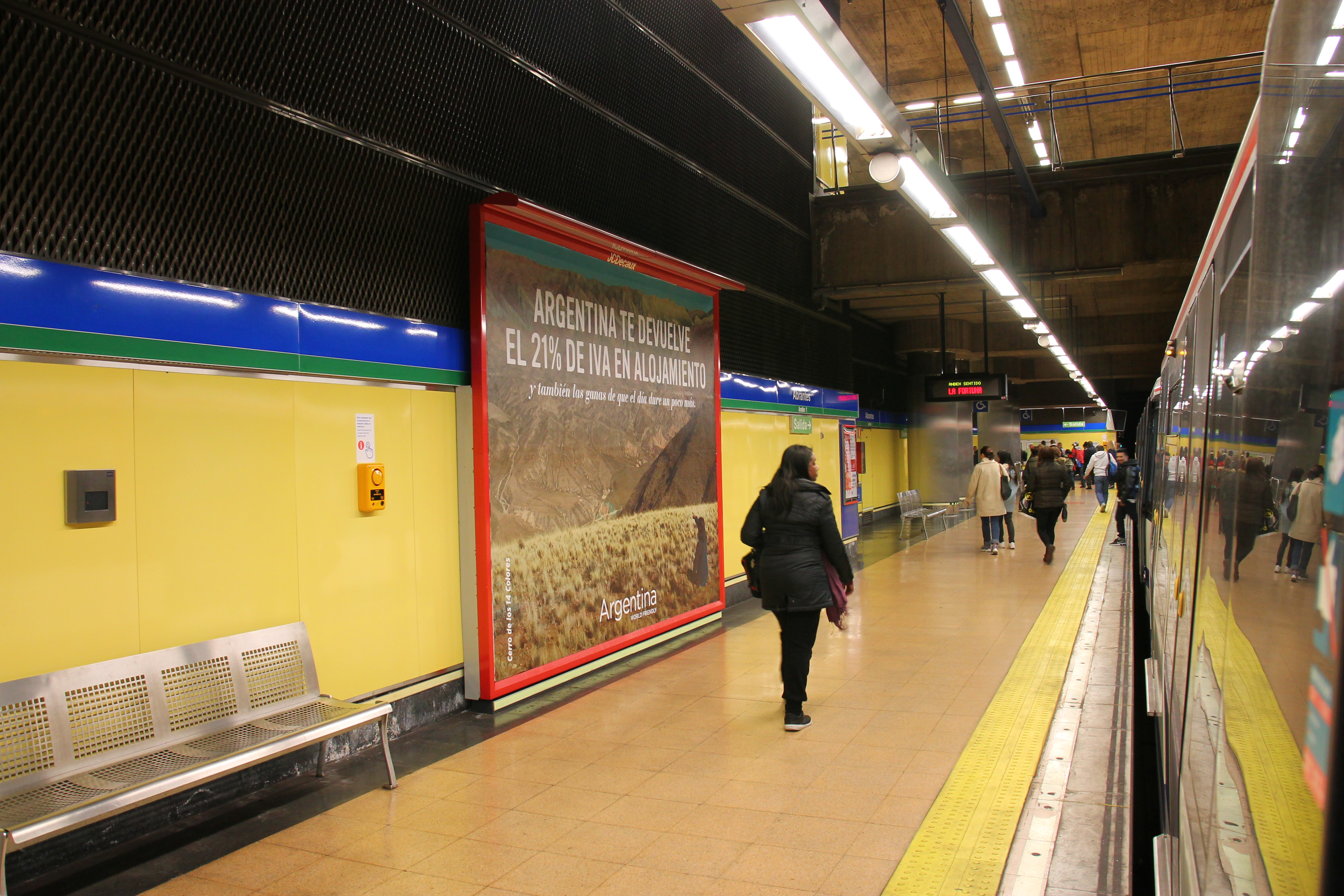
- Platform of the station

General information
- Location: Carabanchel, Madrid; Spain
- Coordinates: 40.3809°N 3.7280°W
- System: Madrid Metro station
- Owner: CRTM
- Operator: CRTM

Construction
- Accessible: yes

Other information
- Fare zone: A

History
- Opened: 16 November 1998; 27 years ago

Services
Preceding station	Madrid Metro	Following station
Plaza Elíptica Terminus	Line 11	Pan Bendito towards La Fortuna
Location
- Location within Madrid

Abrantes [aˈβɾantes] is a station on Line 11 of the Madrid Metro, serving the Abrantes barrio. It is located in fare Zone A.
