= Oporto (disambiguation) =

Oporto is a variation of the spelling of Porto, a city in Portugal.

Oporto may also refer to:

- Oporto Open, a defunct ATP Tour-affiliated men's tennis tournament played from 1995 to 1996
- Oporto (restaurant), Australian fast food restaurant franchise
- Oporto (Madrid Metro), station on Line 5 and Line 6 of the Madrid Metro, located under the Plaza de Oporto
- Oporto British School, British school established in 1894 in Foz do Douro, Porto, Portugal
- Henry Oporto (born 1953), Bolivian government official
