= Carpetana (Madrid Metro) =

Madrid Metro station

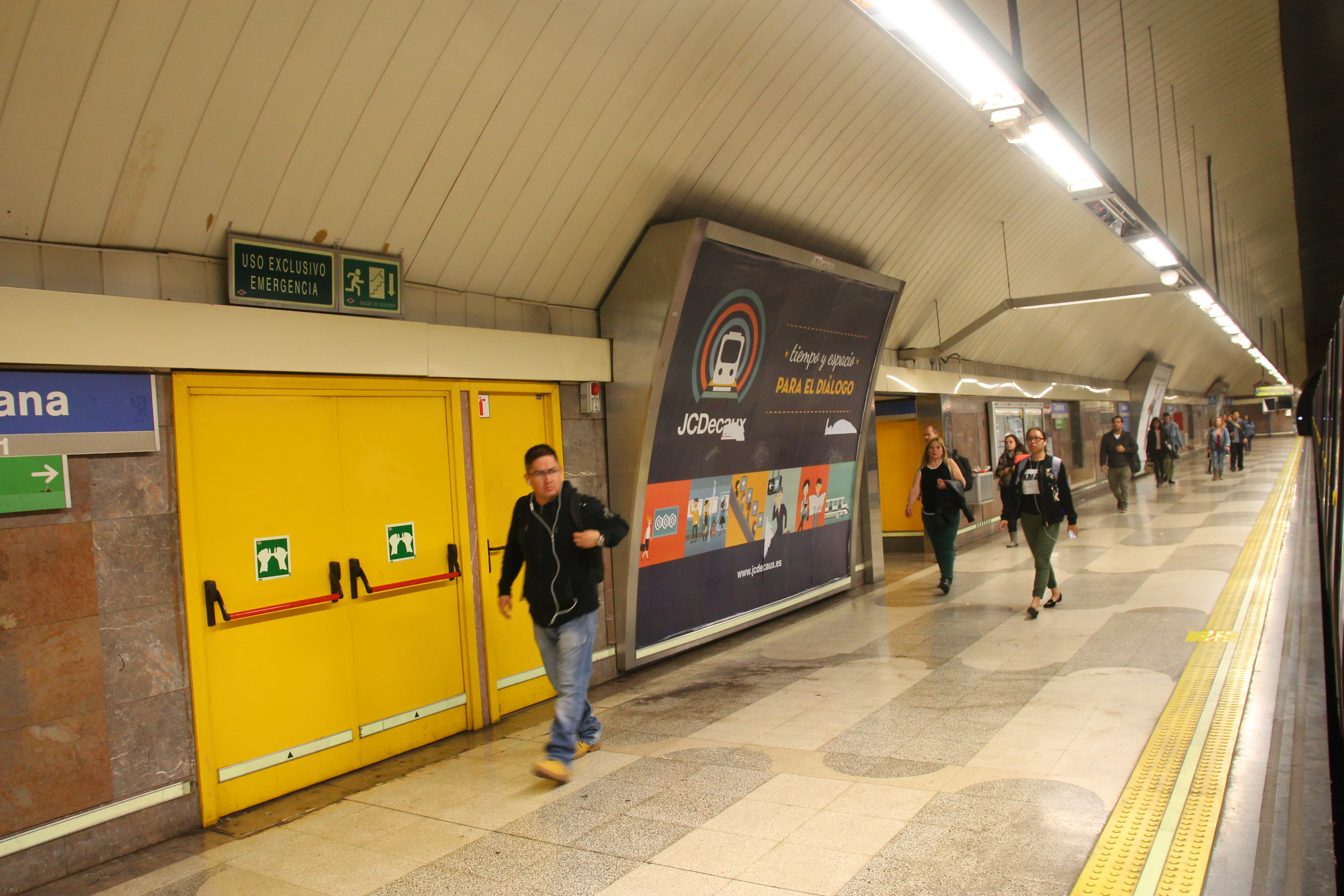
- Platform of the station

General information
- Location: Carabanchel / Latina, Madrid; Spain
- Coordinates: 40.392704°N 3.7409937°W
- System: Madrid Metro station
- Owner: CRTM
- Operator: CRTM

Construction
- Accessible: yes

Other information
- Fare zone: A

History
- Opened: 1 June 1983

Services
Preceding station	Madrid Metro	Following station
Laguna clockwise / outer	Line 6	Oporto anticlockwise / inner
Location
- Location within Madrid

Carpetana (Spanish pronunciation: [kaɾpeˈtana]) is a station on Line 6 of the Madrid Metro, on the Calle Vía Carpetana. It is located in Zone A.

During improvements in 2008, workers discovered thousands of fossils.
