= Vista Alegre (Madrid Metro) =

Madrid Metro station

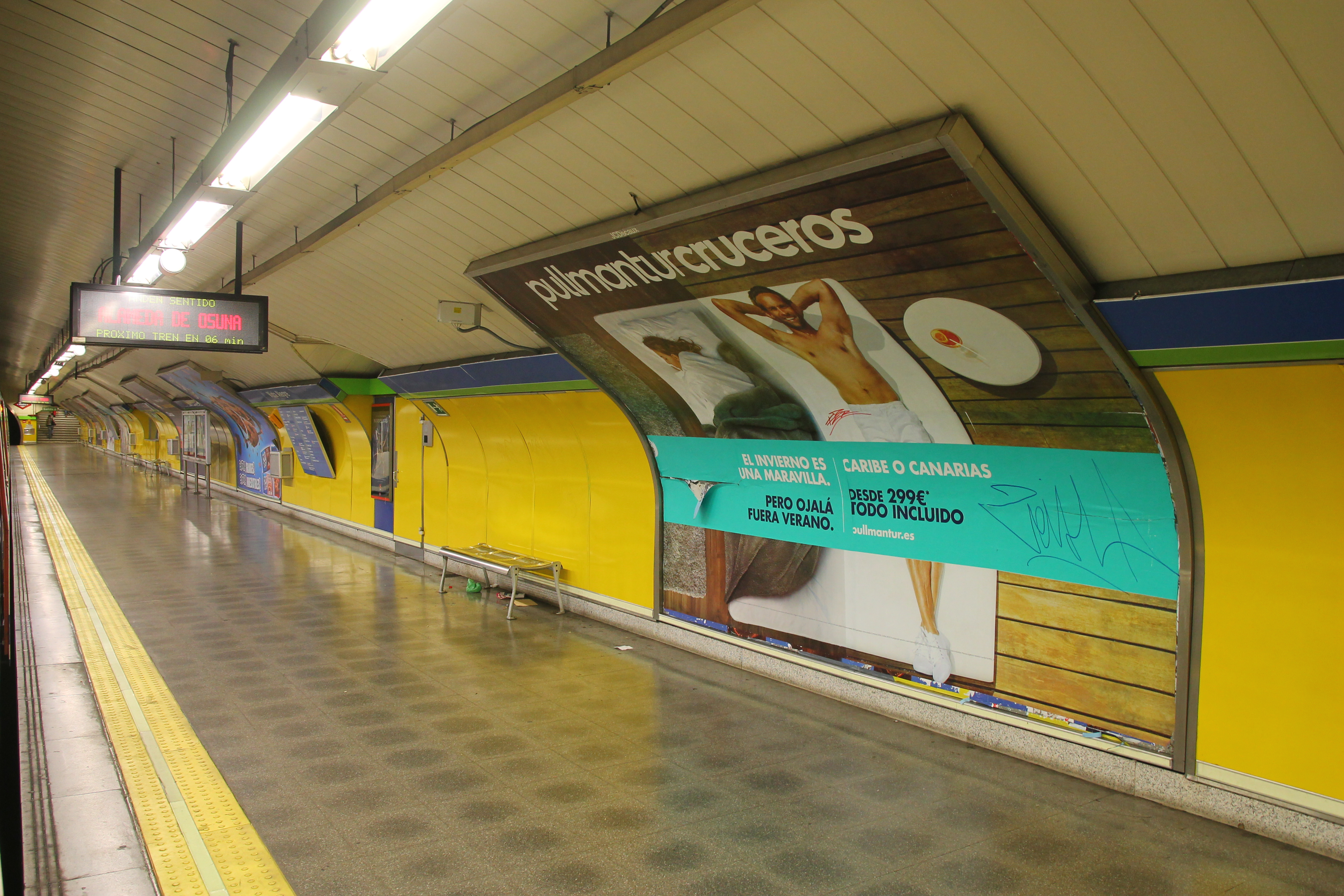

General information
- Location: Carabanchel, Madrid; Spain
- Coordinates: 40.3888466°N 3.7398204°W
- System: Madrid Metro station
- Owner: CRTM
- Operator: CRTM

Construction
- Accessible: No

Other information
- Fare zone: A

History
- Opened: 5 June 1968

Services
Preceding station	Madrid Metro	Following station
Oporto towards Alameda de Osuna	Line 5	Carabanchel towards Casa de Campo
Location
- Location within Madrid

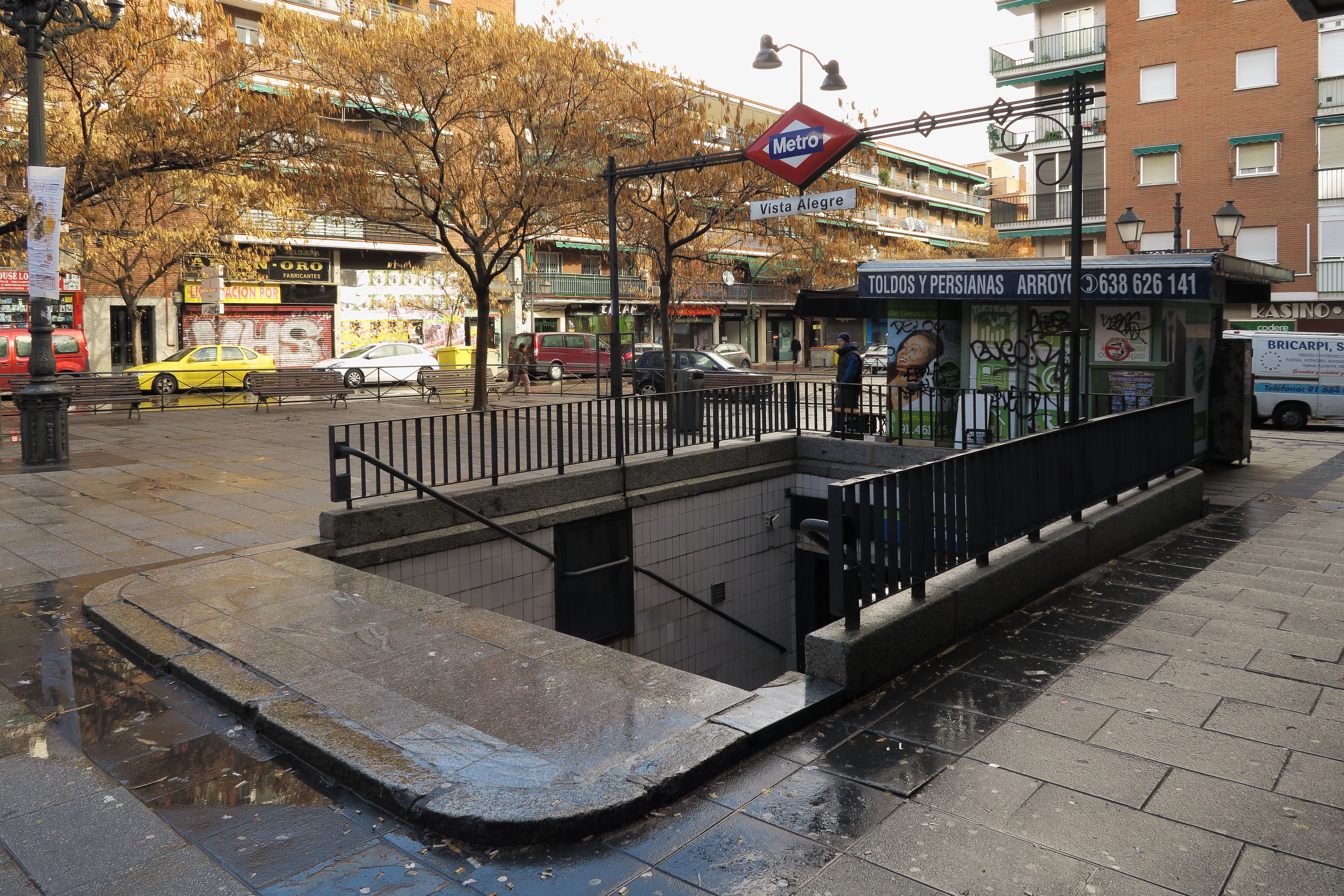

Vista Alegre [ˈbista aˈleɣɾe] is a station of Line 5 of the Madrid Metro, serving the Vista Alegre barrio. It is located in fare Zone A.
