= Alto de Extremadura (Madrid Metro) =

Madrid Metro station

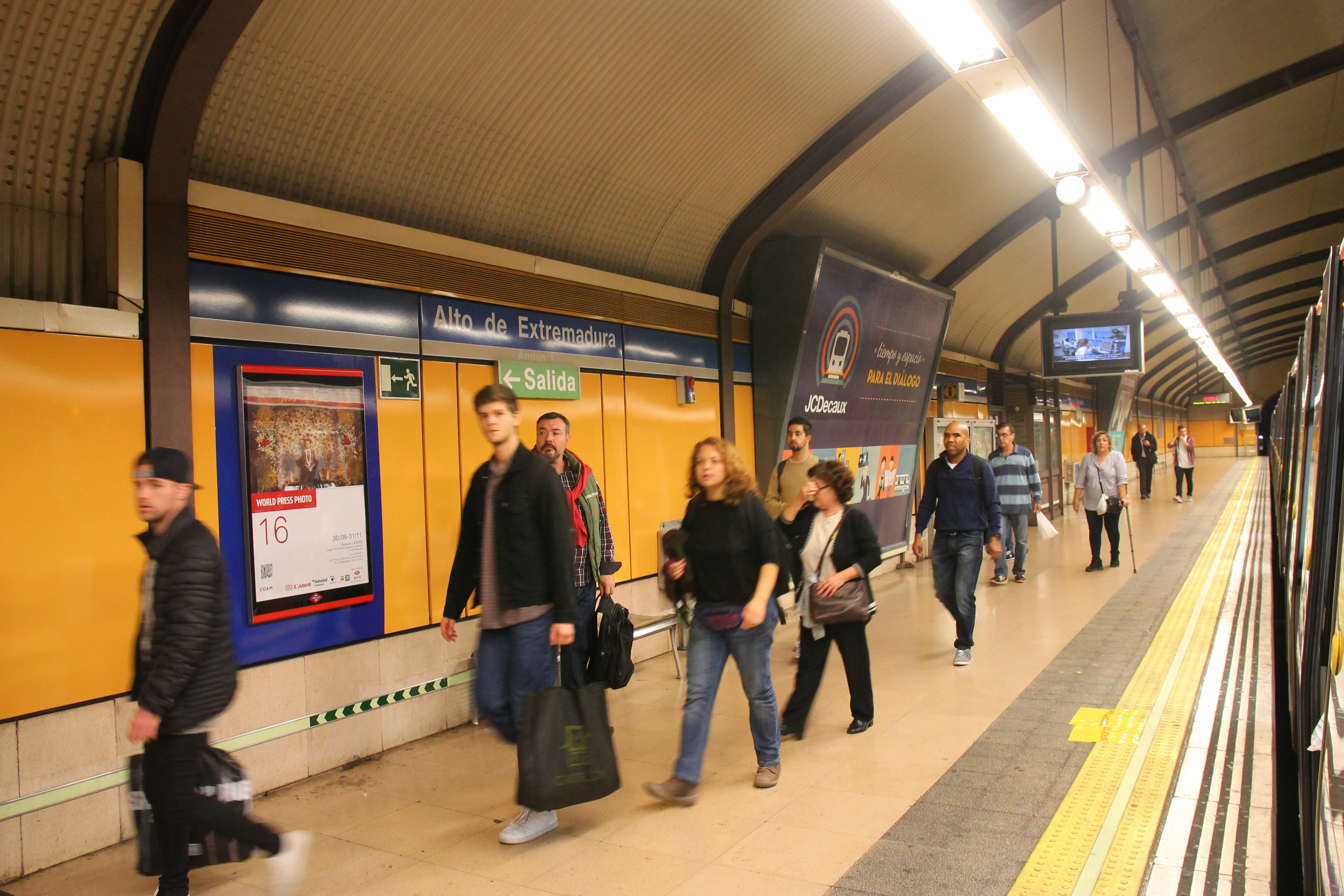
- Platform of the station

General information
- Location: Latina, Madrid; Spain
- Coordinates: 40.4099246°N 3.7389312°W
- System: Madrid Metro station
- Owner: CRTM
- Operator: CRTM

Construction
- Accessible: No

Other information
- Fare zone: A

History
- Opened: 10 May 1995

Services
| Preceding station | Madrid Metro | Following station |
|---|---|---|
| Puerta del Ángel clockwise / outer | Line 6 | Lucero anticlockwise / inner |
Location
- Location within Madrid

Alto de Extremadura ([ˈalto ðe eɣstɾemaˈðuɾa], "Upper Extremadura") is a station on Line 6 of the Madrid Metro on the Paseo de Extremadura ("Extremadura Walk") in Zone A.
