= Line 6 (Madrid Metro) =

Rapid transit line of the Madrid Metro

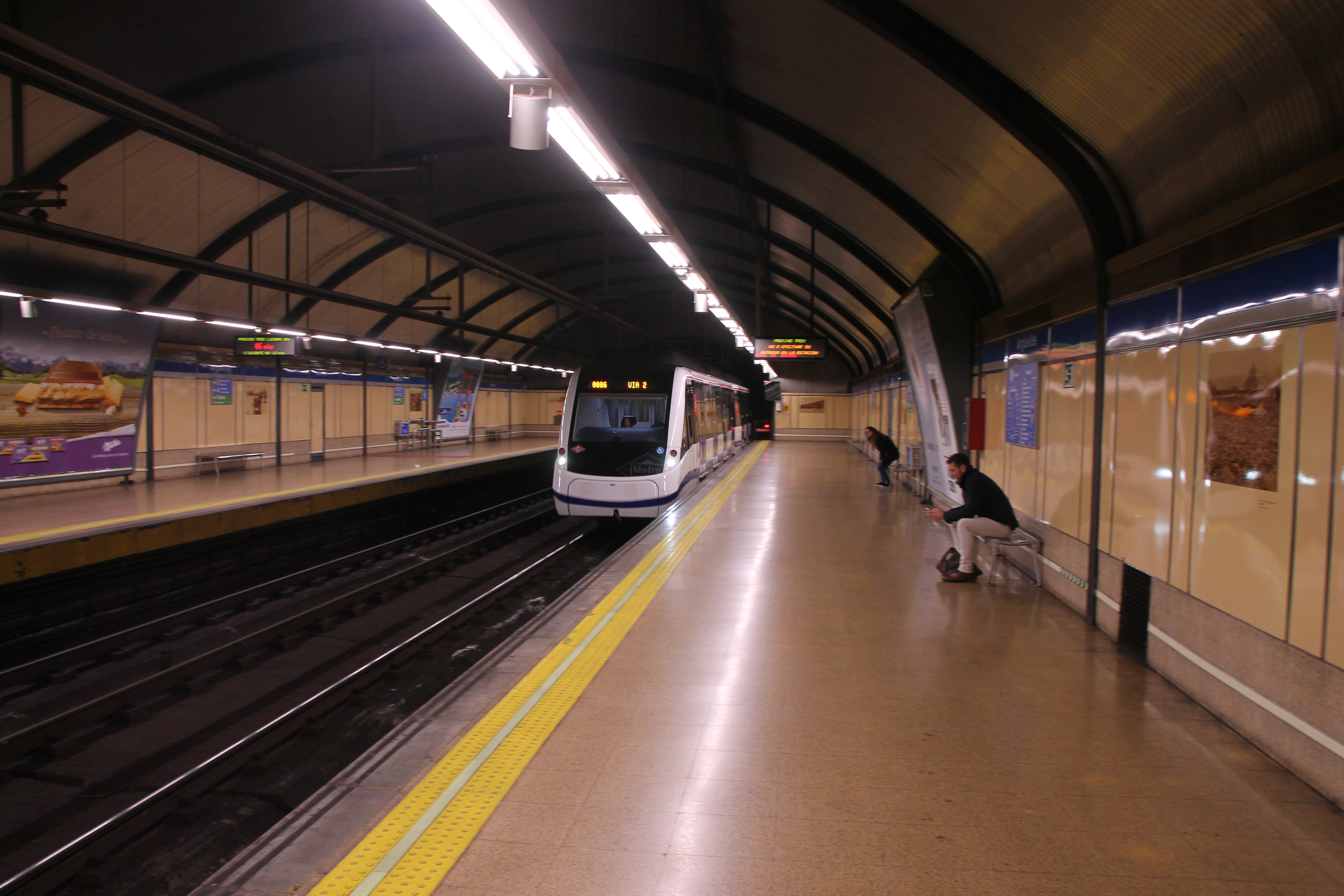
- A Class 8400 train at Argüelles station

Overview
- Other name: Línea 6 Circular
- Native name: Línea 6
- Owner: CRTM
- Locale: Madrid
- Stations: 28
- Website: www.metromadrid.es/en/linea/linea-6-circular

Service
- Type: Rapid transit
- System: Madrid Metro
- Operator: CRTM
- Rolling stock: CAF 8400

History
- Opened: 7 May 1981; 45 years ago
- Last extension: 1995

Technical
- Line length: 23.5 km (14.6 mi)
- Character: Underground
- Track gauge: 1,445 mm (4 ft 8 7/8 in)

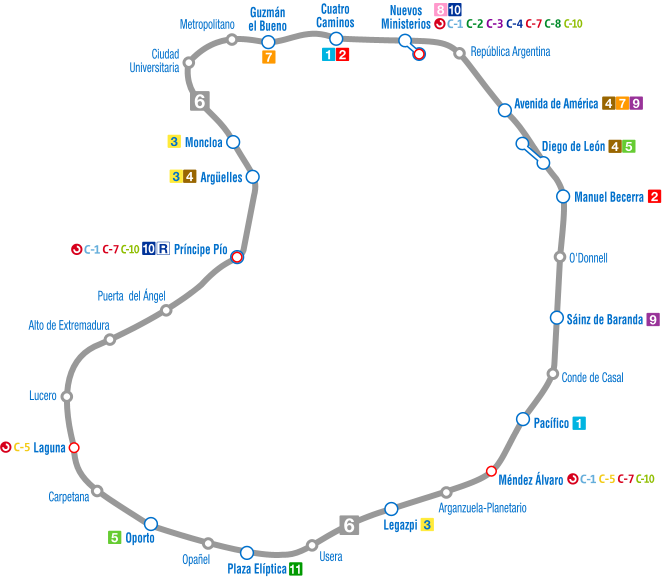
Map of the line, its stations and interchanges.

Line 6 (Spanish: Línea 6 Circular) of the Madrid Metro opened originally between Cuatro Caminos and Pacifico in 1979. This is one of two circular lines in Madrid, but unlike Line 12, it did not open as a full circle. The circle was completed in 1995, taking four stages from its original opening. It has a length of 23.5 km (14.6 mi) and is coloured grey on route maps.

The line is made up of 28 stations with 115-metre platforms, linked by 23.472 km of wide gauge tunnel tracks. It allows one to transfer twice to all the lines of the network (three times in the case of lines 3 and 4) with the exception of lines 8 and 11, which start from the circular route and do not enter it, and the peripheral lines. (such as line 12 and the Light Metro lines).

Being built to allow transfers with many other lines and to cover the entire central area of the city, plagued by unevenness, it is one of the first lines, along with line 5, that was built at great depth, so that it would not suffer major damage from unevenness in its route. Thus, for example, the greatest depth of the Madrid Metro system is reached at the Cuatro Caminos station (a depth of 45 meters below ground) given that the tunnel is at the same altitude above sea level as, for example, in Príncipe Pío, its most superficial point (where it still remains two stories below the ground). This means that although the line is of very high utility in the system, sometimes some of the transfers are longer than the average in the network.

Along its route are some of the large interchanges built in recent years: Moncloa, Príncipe Pío, Plaza Elíptica and Avenida de América, in addition to the correspondence with Cercanías Renfe in Nuevos Ministerios, Laguna and Méndez Álvaro (which also coincides with the South Bus Station of Madrid).

== History ==
First on 7 May 1981, the line was extended from Pacifico to Oporto, then on 1 June 1983, the line was extended from Oporto to Laguna. Thirdly the line was extended from Cuatro Caminos to Ciudad Universitaria serving Madrid's Complutense university on 13 January 1987, and lastly the line was extended from Ciudad Universitaria to Laguna on 10 May 1995, completing the circle. Arganzuela-Planetario station opened on 26 January 2007 between Legazpi and Méndez Álvaro. This station serves Madrid's Planetarium and IMAX theatre.

== Operation ==
Line 6 is one of the busiest lines on the network, so to ease congestion on the busiest stations, Madrid adopted the "Spanish solution". This means that at some stations there are two side platforms, and an island platform. This was also used on Line 5, but only two stations preserve the original layout (Campamento and Carabanchel).

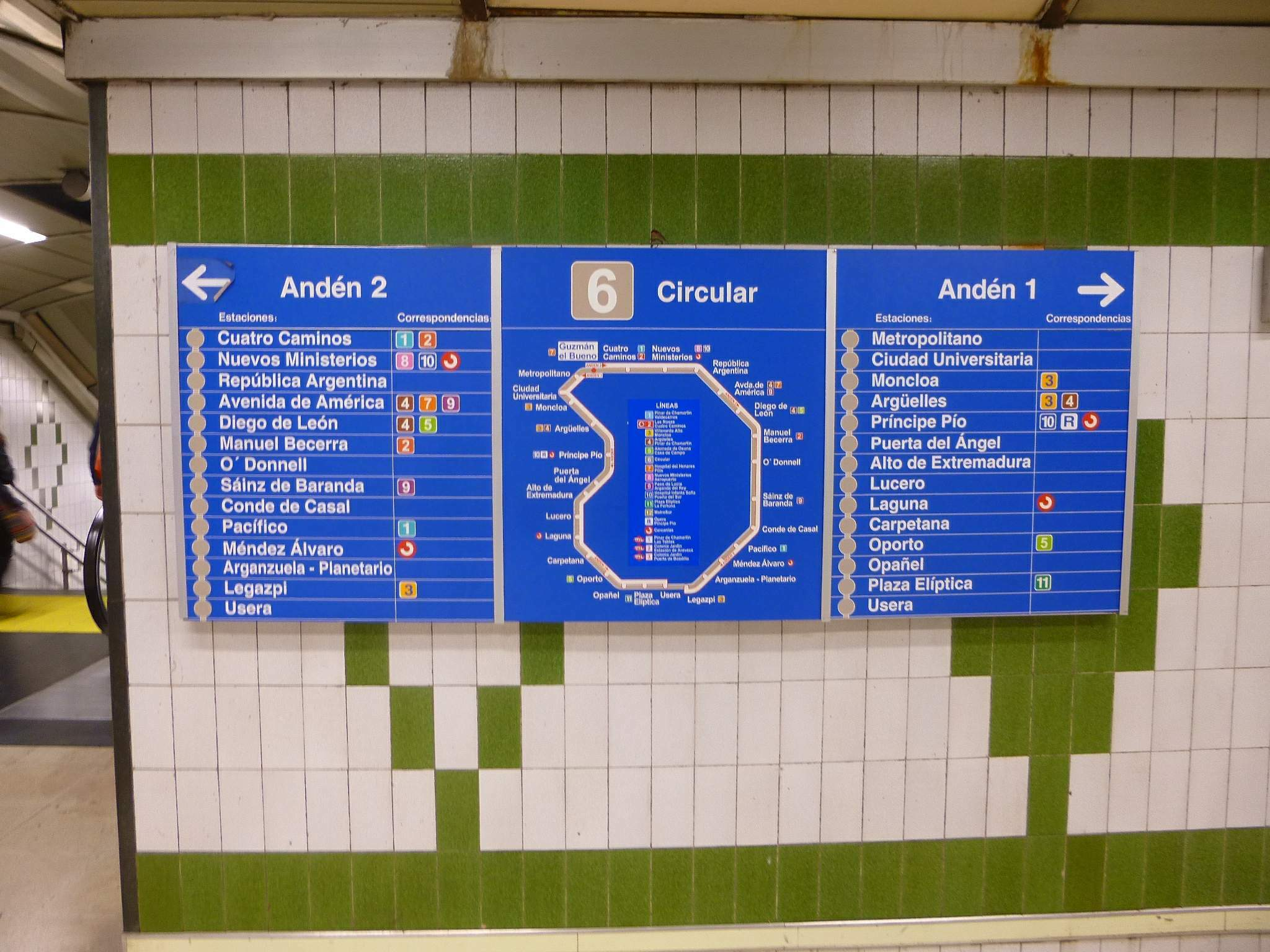
Route map and station list at Guzmán el Bueno.

Line 6 uses 6-car trains of class 8400. Until summer 2025 it also had class 5000 running, but were rendered incompatible with the line as it was re-electrified to 1500V Dc instead of 600V Dc in September 2025.

Trains travelling clockwise (when viewing the route map from above) are designated as "Platform 2" (Spanish: Andén 2), while those travelling anticlockwise are designated as "Platform 1" (Andén 1).

== Future ==
On 2 August 2024, Metro Madrid announced that they plan to have platform screen doors installed at all stations on line 6. The works are scheduled to begin in 1 June 2025, coinciding with the major track renewal works that had already been planned for the line that year. This project is considered to be the first major step towards the eventual goal of fully driverless operations on the line. The driverless trains have already been ordered, with the first sets expected to enter service in 2027.

== Stations ==
| District | Station | Opened | Zone | Connections |
|---|---|---|---|---|
| Latina | Laguna | 1983 | A | |
| Latina / Carabanchel | Carpetana | 1983 | A | |
| Carabanchel | Oporto | 1968 | A | Madrid Metro: |
| Carabanchel | Opañel | 1981 | A | |
| Carabanchel | Plaza Elíptica | 1981 | A | Madrid Metro: |
| Usera | Usera | 1981 | A | |
| Arganzuela | Legazpi | 1951 | A | Madrid Metro: |
| Arganzuela | Arganzuela-Planetario | 2007 | A | |
| Arganzuela | Méndez Álvaro | 1979 | A | Cercanías Madrid: |
| Retiro | Pacífico | 1923 | A | Madrid Metro: |
| Retiro | Conde de Casal | 1979 | A | |
| Retiro | Sainz de Baranda | 1979 | A | Madrid Metro: |
| Retiro / Salamanca | O'Donnell | 1979 | A | |
| Salamanca | Manuel Becerra | 1924 | A | Madrid Metro: |
| Salamanca | Diego de León | 1932 | A | Madrid Metro: |
| Salamanca / Chamartín | Avenida de América | 1973 | A | Madrid Metro: |
| Chamartín | República Argentina | 1979 | A | |
| Chamartín / Chamberí / Tetuán | Nuevos Ministerios | 1979 | A | Madrid Metro: Cercanías Madrid: Media Distancia: 53 |
| Chamberí / Tetuán | Cuatro Caminos | 1919 | A | Madrid Metro: |
| Chamberí / Moncloa-Aravaca | Guzmán el Bueno | 1987 | A | Madrid Metro: |
| Chamberí / Moncloa-Aravaca | Vicente Aleixandre | 1987 | A | |
| Moncloa-Aravaca | Ciudad Universitaria | 1987 | A | |
| Chamberí / Moncloa-Aravaca | Moncloa | 1963 | A | Madrid Metro: |
| Chamberí / Moncloa-Aravaca / Centro | Argüelles | 1941 | A | Madrid Metro: |
| Moncloa-Aravaca | Príncipe Pío | 1925 | A | Madrid Metro: Cercanías Madrid: Media Distancia: 13, 16 |
| Latina | Puerta del Ángel | 1995 | A | |
| Latina | Alto de Extremadura | 1995 | A | |
| Latina | Lucero | 1995 | A | |

== See also ==
- Madrid
- Transport in Madrid
- List of Madrid Metro stations
- List of metro systems
