= Lucero (Madrid Metro) =

Madrid Metro station

- Platform of the station

General information
- Location: Latina, Madrid; Spain
- Coordinates: 40.4047855°N 3.7455976°W
- System: Madrid Metro station
- Owner: CRTM
- Operator: CRTM

Construction
- Accessible: yes

Other information
- Fare zone: A

History
- Opened: 10 May 1995

Services
Preceding station	Madrid Metro	Following station
Alto de Extremadura clockwise / outer	Line 6	Laguna anticlockwise / inner
Location
- Location within Madrid

Lucero [luˈθe.ɾo] is a station on Line 6 of the Madrid Metro serving the Lucero barrio. It is located in Zone A.
