= Las Águilas =

Coordinates: 40°22′39″N 3°45′51″W

- City neighborhood
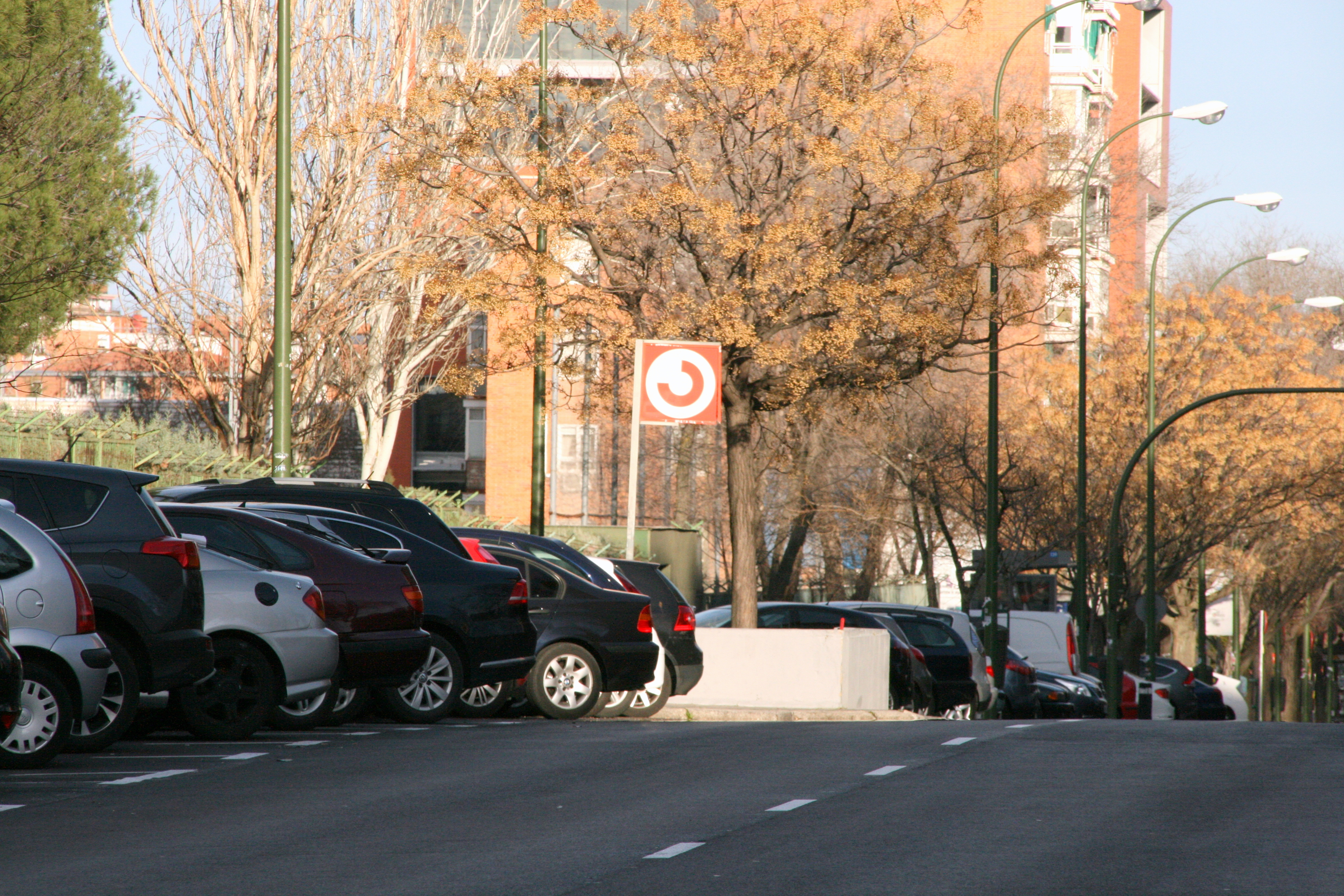
- Interactive map of Las Águilas
- Country: Spain
- Region: Community of Madrid
- Municipality: Madrid
- District: Latina

Las Águilas is an administrative neighborhood (barrio) of Madrid belonging to the district of Latina Las Águilas is in the southwest of the city of Madrid. In the 1960s and 70s it was all land and parks.But as the city grow in population, the land outside the city started to be used for building homes for working clase people that came from different parts of Spain. Is bounded by neighbourhoods Aluche,Cuatro Vientos,Campamento and it's beside the Aeropuerto de Madrid-Cuatro Vientos it's a military base airport .
