= Laguna (Madrid Metro) =

Madrid Metro station

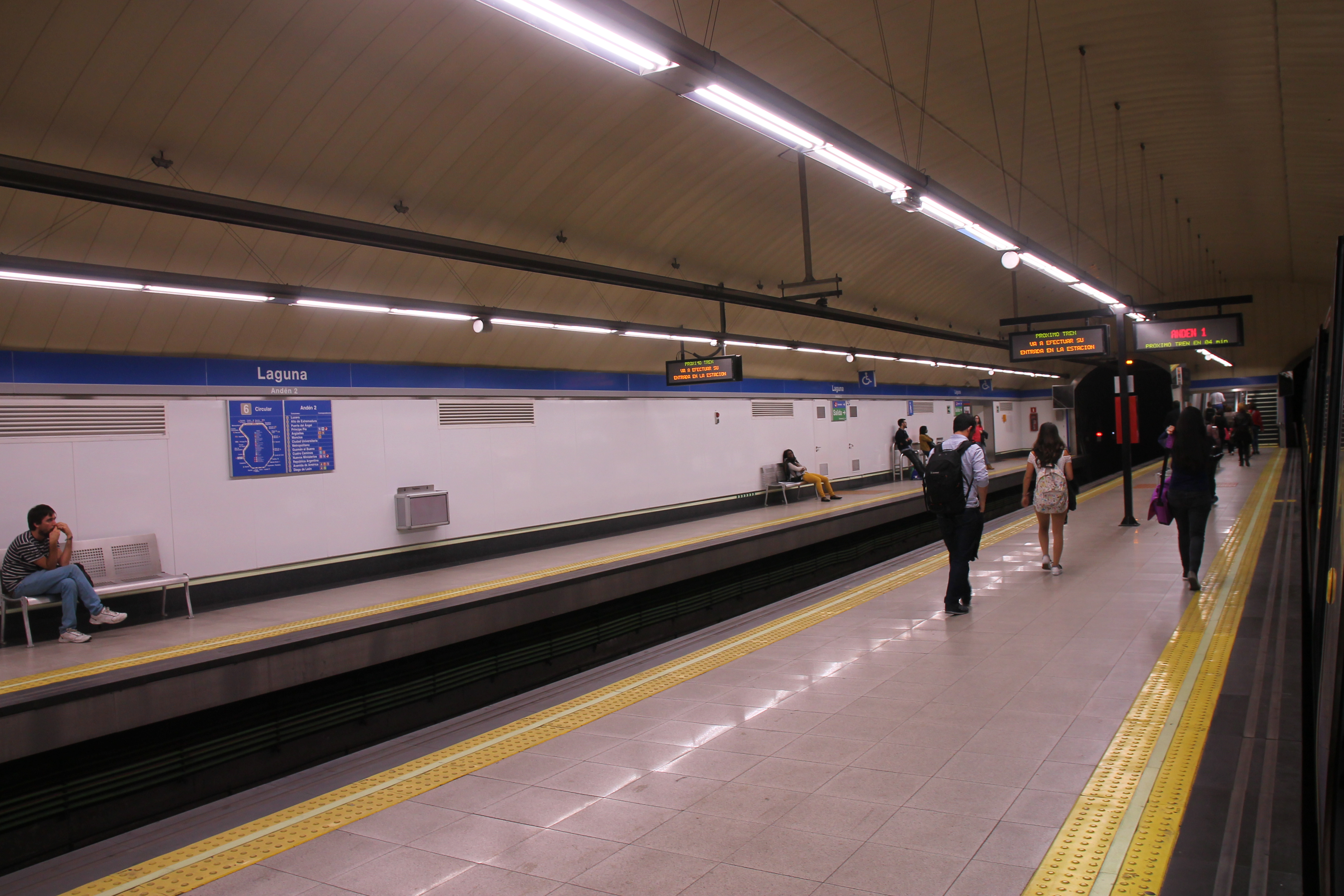

General information
- Location: Latina, Madrid; Spain
- Coordinates: 40.399176°N 3.7442212°W
- System: Madrid Metro station
- Owner: CRTM
- Operator: CRTM

Construction
- Accessible: yes

Other information
- Fare zone: A

History
- Opened: 1 June 1983

Services
Preceding station	Madrid Metro	Following station
Lucero clockwise / outer	Line 6	Carpetana anticlockwise / inner
Out of system interchange
Preceding station	Cercanías Madrid	Following station
Aluche towards Móstoles-El Soto	C-5	Embajadores towards Humanes
Location
- Location within Madrid

Laguna is a station on Line 6 of the Madrid Metro. It is located in Zone A. The station offers connection to Cercanías Madrid via Laguna railway station.
