= Aluche =

Neighborhood in Madrid, Spain

Coordinates: 40°23′15″N 3°45′15″W

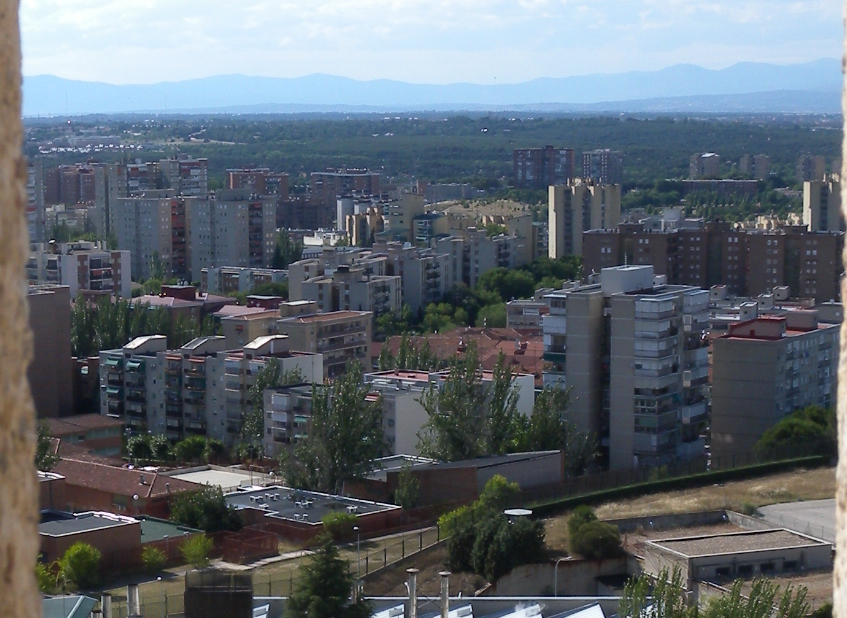
(Aluche) Hospital Central de la Defensa Gomez Ulla (5825313021) by Ricardo Ricote (cropped)

Aluche [aˈlutʃe] is a barrio of the city of Madrid, situated in the southwest of the city, in the Latina district. It is bounded by the barrios of Campamento, Las Águilas, Lucero, Los Cármenes, and the Carabanchel district. Casa de Campo is also nearby. Aluche takes its name from the Luche creek that formerly flowed through the neighbourhood.

With 75,871 inhabitants, it is the largest of Madrid's barrios (according to the 2001 census). Many of its streets are named after towns and villages of the province of Toledo and also towns and villages of Extremadura an example would be Paseo de Extremadura. Intercambiador de Aluche is located in the area.
