= Vicente Aleixandre (Madrid Metro) =

Madrid Metro station

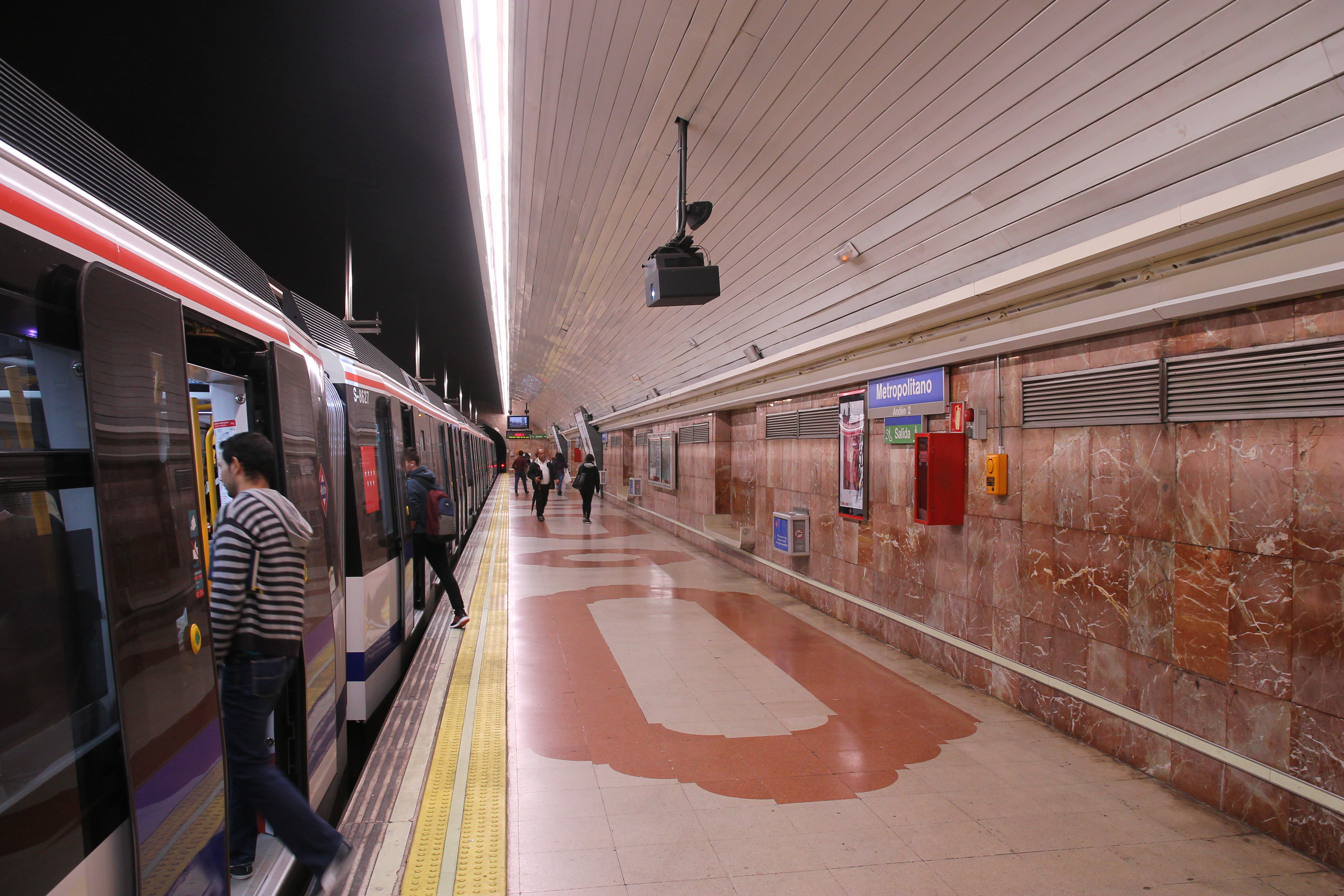
- Platform of the station

General information
- Location: Moncloa-Aravaca/Chamberí, Madrid; Spain
- Coordinates: 40.446435°N 3.7194254°W
- System: Madrid Metro station
- Owner: CRTM
- Operator: CRTM

Construction
- Accessible: No

Other information
- Fare zone: A

History
- Opened: 13 January 1987

Services
Preceding station	Madrid Metro	Following station
Guzmán el Bueno clockwise / outer	Line 6	Ciudad Universitaria anticlockwise / inner
Location
- Location within Madrid

Vicente Aleixandre [biˈθente alejɣˈsandɾe] is a station on Line 6 of the Madrid Metro, located beneath Gregorio del Amo avenue in the Moncloa-Aravaca district in fare Zone A, although one of its exits is located in the Chamberí district. It is named after the Spanish poet Vicente Aleixandre (1898–1984).

Vicente Aleixandre is one of only two stations in the system (the other one is Colonia Jardín) at which it is not possible to change direction without leaving the station. Vicente Aleixandre is not handicapped accessible, as it does not have elevators.

== History ==
The station was opened to the public on 13 January 1987 when Line 6 was extended to Ciudad Universitaria. It was originally named Metropolitano for the Colonia del Metropolitano (Metropolitan Colony), a neighborhood developed by the Compañía del Metropolitano (Metropolitan Company, today the Madrid Metro) in the 1920s.

The station is near the University City of Madrid, and the neighborhood where it is located is home to many academic and medical institutions, such as the residential colleges of nearby universities, the EOI Business School, the Diplomatic School of Spain, the Virgen de la Paloma Hospital, the Santa Elena Clinic, and various offices and departments of the Complutense University of Madrid, the Technical University of Madrid, and the Spanish National Research Council.

Between 28 June and 28 August 2014, the stretch of Line 6 between Metropolitano and Moncloa was closed for works, which included the renovation of a platform and the replacement of a spur to the underground train storage depot at Ciudad Universitaria station.

On 1 December 2018 the station was renamed Vicente Aleixandre in honor of poet Vicente Aleixandre who lived in the vicinity of the station. The name was changed both to honor Aleixandre and to avoid confusion with the Estadio Metropolitano station on Line 7.
