= Palacio Vistalegre =

Multipurpose arena in Madrid, Spain

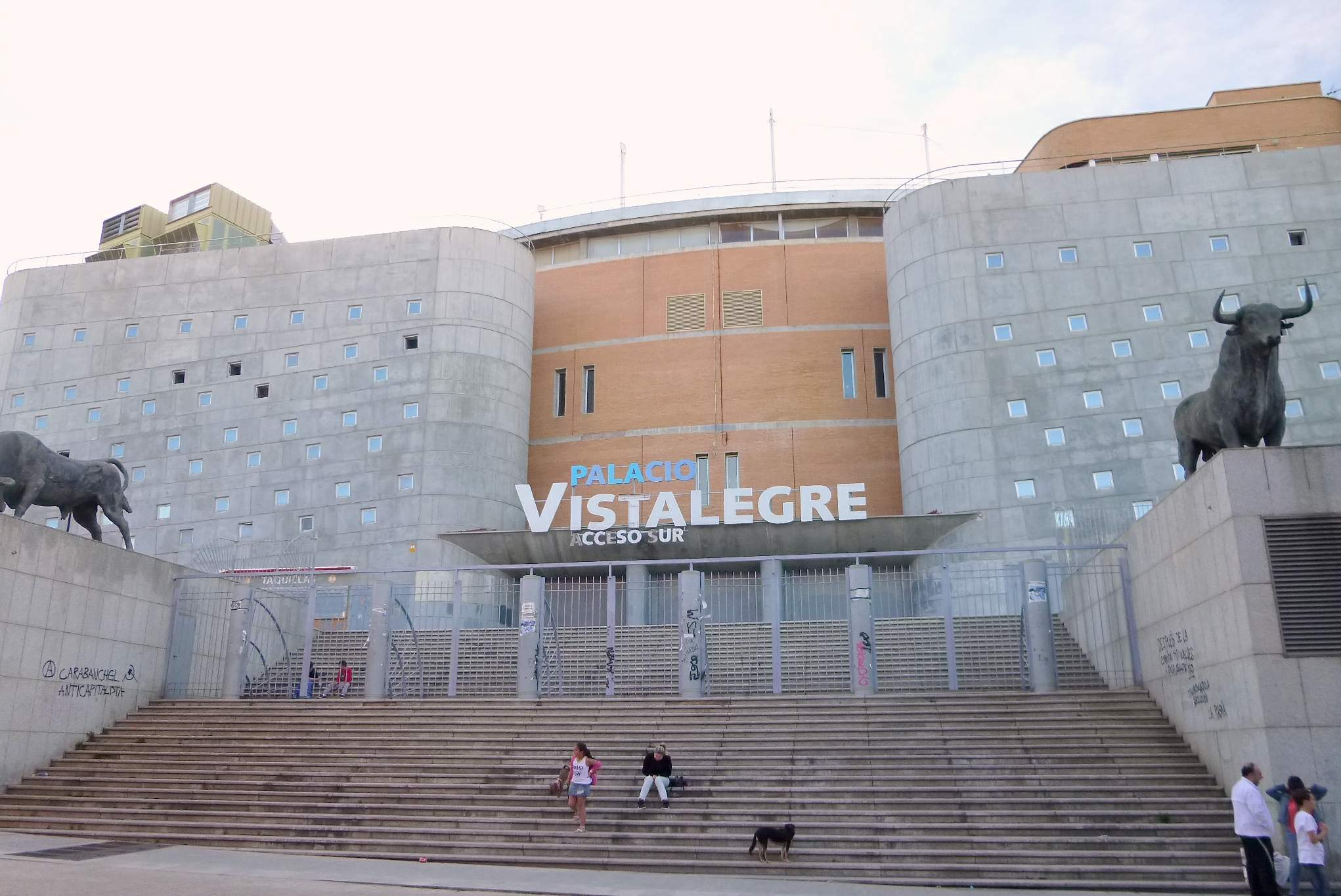
- Entrance of venue, c. 2015
- Interactive map of Palacio Vistalegre
- Address: Calle de Utebo, 1; 28025 Madrid; Spain
- Location: Vista Alegre, Carabanchel
- Coordinates: 40°23′10″N 3°44′20″W
- Operator: Palumi S.A.
- Capacity: 14,000 (The Arena); 5,000 (The Center); 1,978 (Sala San Miguel)

Construction
- Opened: 30 March 2000
- Cost: €25 million

Tenants
- CB Estudiantes (ACB) (2001–05); Real Madrid (ACB) (2004–10); BM Atlético Madrid (ASOBAL) (2011–13)

Website
- palaciovistalegre.com

The Palacio Vistalegre is a multipurpose arena located in Madrid, Spain. It was built on the site of the former bullring, "Plaza de toros de Vista Alegre", inaugurated in 1908 and demolished in 1995. The venue is composed of three main spaces: The Arena, The Centre and the Sala San Miguel (formerly known as The Box).

== History ==
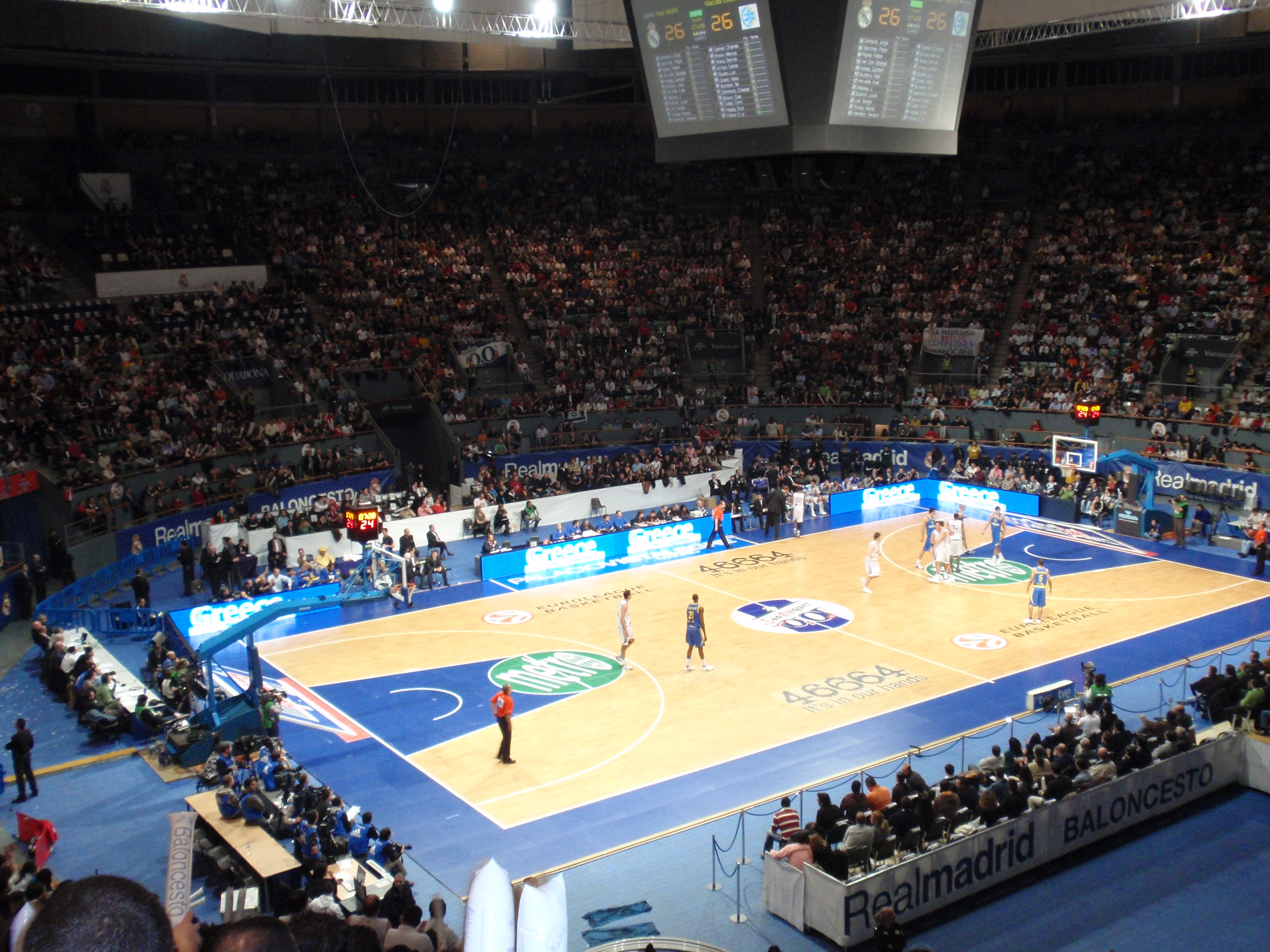
Palacio Vistalegre during a basketball game

In 1980, the original bullring closed, and the site stood empty until plans were unveiled in 1996 for the modern arena, which would also be capable of staging bullfights.

The arena was opened in 2000, offering a seating capacity of 14,000 and has 1,015 parking places.

== See also ==
- List of indoor arenas in Spain

Events and tenants
Preceded by Raimundo Saporta Pavilion	Home of Real Madrid; 2004–2010	Succeeded by Caja Mágica
Preceded by Palacio de Deportes de la CAM	Home of CB Estudiantes; 2001–2005	Succeeded by Madrid Arena
