= Oporto (Madrid Metro) =

Madrid Metro station

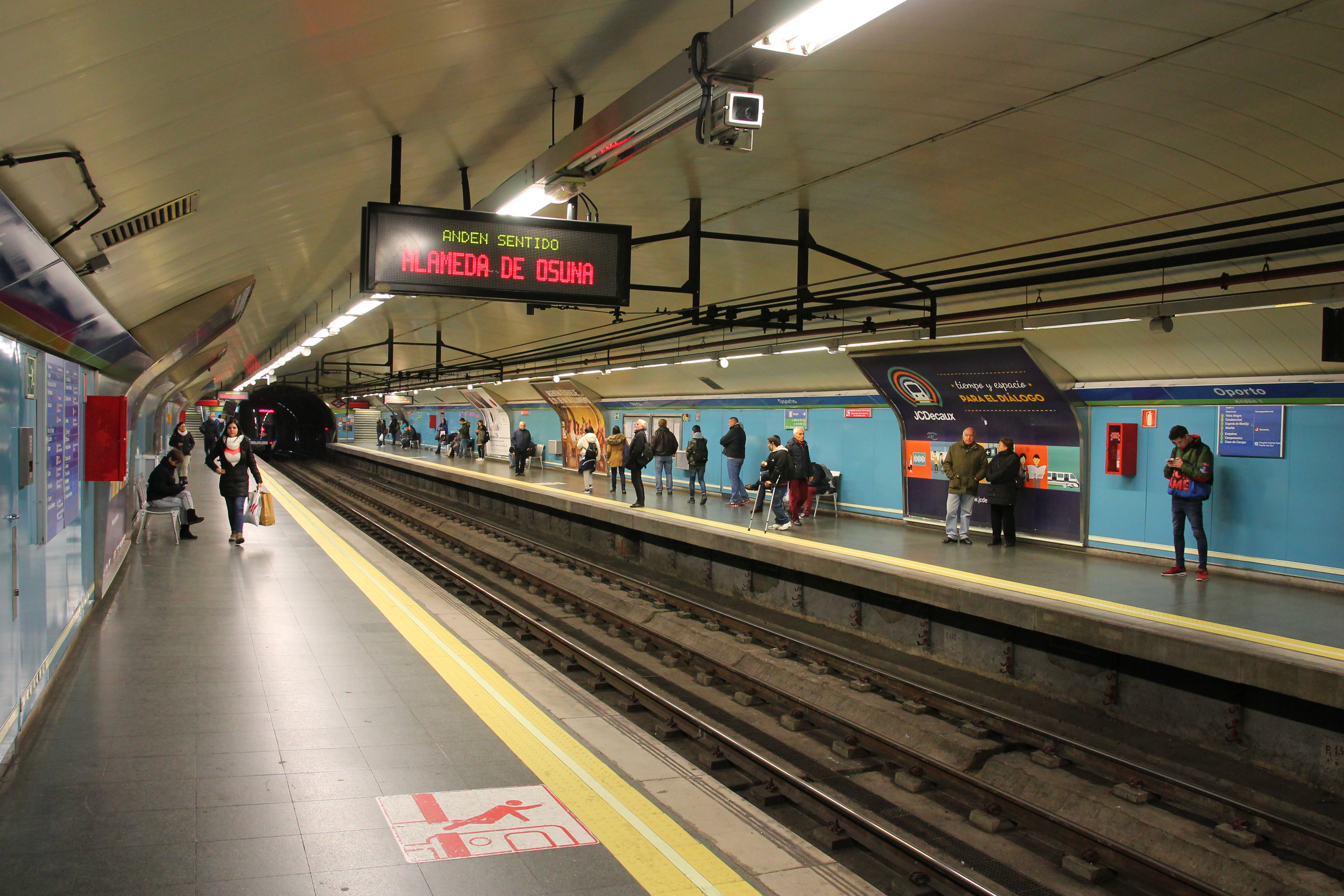
- Platforms of the Line 5

General information
- Location: Carabanchel, Madrid; Spain
- Coordinates: 40.3884681°N 3.7313214°W
- System: Madrid Metro station
- Owner: CRTM
- Operator: CRTM

Construction
- Accessible: No

Other information
- Fare zone: A

History
- Opened: 5 June 1968

Services
Preceding station	Madrid Metro	Following station
Urgel towards Alameda de Osuna	Line 5	Vista Alegre towards Casa de Campo
Carpetana clockwise / outer	Line 6	Opañel anticlockwise / inner
Location
- Location within Madrid

Oporto [oˈpoɾto] is a station on Line 5 and Line 6 of the Madrid Metro, located under the Plaza de Oporto ("Porto Place"). It is in fare Zone A.
