= Vista Alegre, Neuquén =

Vista Alegre
- Municipality and village
- Location within Neuquén Province Location within Argentina
- Coordinates: 38°45′S 68°11′W
- Country: Argentina
- Province: Neuquén Province
- Time zone: UTC−3 (ART)
- Climate: BWk

Vista Alegre (Neuquén) is a village and municipality in Neuquén Province in southwestern Argentina.
