= Henry Oporto =

Bolivian politician

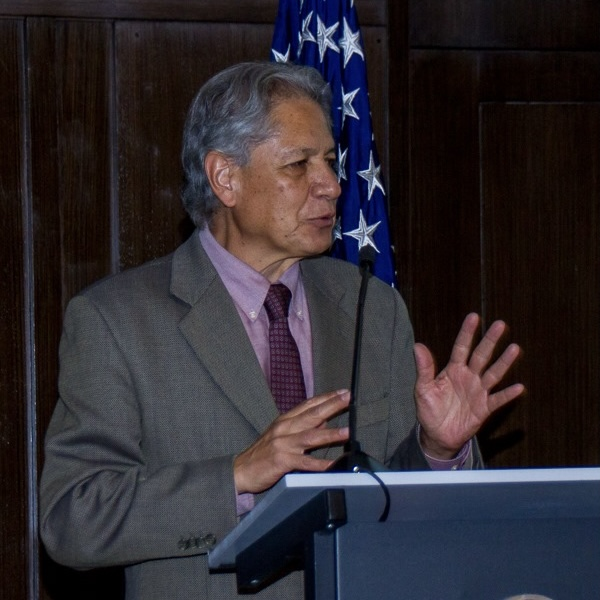
- Henry Oporto in 2019

Minister of Sustainable Development and Planning of Bolivia
- In office October 17, 2003 – January 22, 2006
- President: Gonzalo Sánchez de Lozada

Deputy Minister of Planning and Territorial Management of Bolivia
- In office August 18, 2002 – October 17, 2003
- President: Gonzalo Sánchez de Lozada

Chief of State Affairs, Vice Presidency of Bolivia
- In office August 15, 1993 – August 6, 1997
- President: Gonzalo Sánchez de Lozada

Chief of Staff, Ministry of Productive Development and Plural Economy
- In office June 3, 2020 – November 3, 2020
- President: Jeanine Áñez

Personal details
- Born: Henry Fernando Oporto Castro; June 11, 1953 (age 72) Cochabamba, Bolivia
- Citizenship: Bolivian
- Spouse(s): Carmen Ortiz Cespedes (m. 2004; div. 2007) Estela Rivera Eid (m. 1986; div. 2002)
- Children: Valeria Oporto Vargas; Simon Oporto Rivera; Nicolas Oporto Rivera; Desiree Oporto Sanchez; Santiago Oporto; Sofia Oporto Ortiz; Jeronimo Oporto Boland
- Education: Higher University of San Andrés
- Occupation: Politician, businessman, writer, sociologist
- Website: Official site

Henry Fernando Oporto Castro (born June 11, 1953, in Cochabamba, Bolivia) is a Bolivian politician, businessman, writer, and sociologist. He served as the Minister of Sustainable Development and Planning in Bolivia during the government of Gonzalo Sánchez de Lozada. He is notable for his role in the fight against dictatorship in the 1970s and the subsequent restoration of democracy in 1982.

== Biography ==
Oporto studied sociology at the Higher University of San Andrés in La Paz. In his early years, he presided over the University Federation. He actively participated in the fight against dictatorship in the 1970s and the restoration of Bolivian democracy in 1982. Due to oppression against his democratic ideals, he lived in exile for several years.

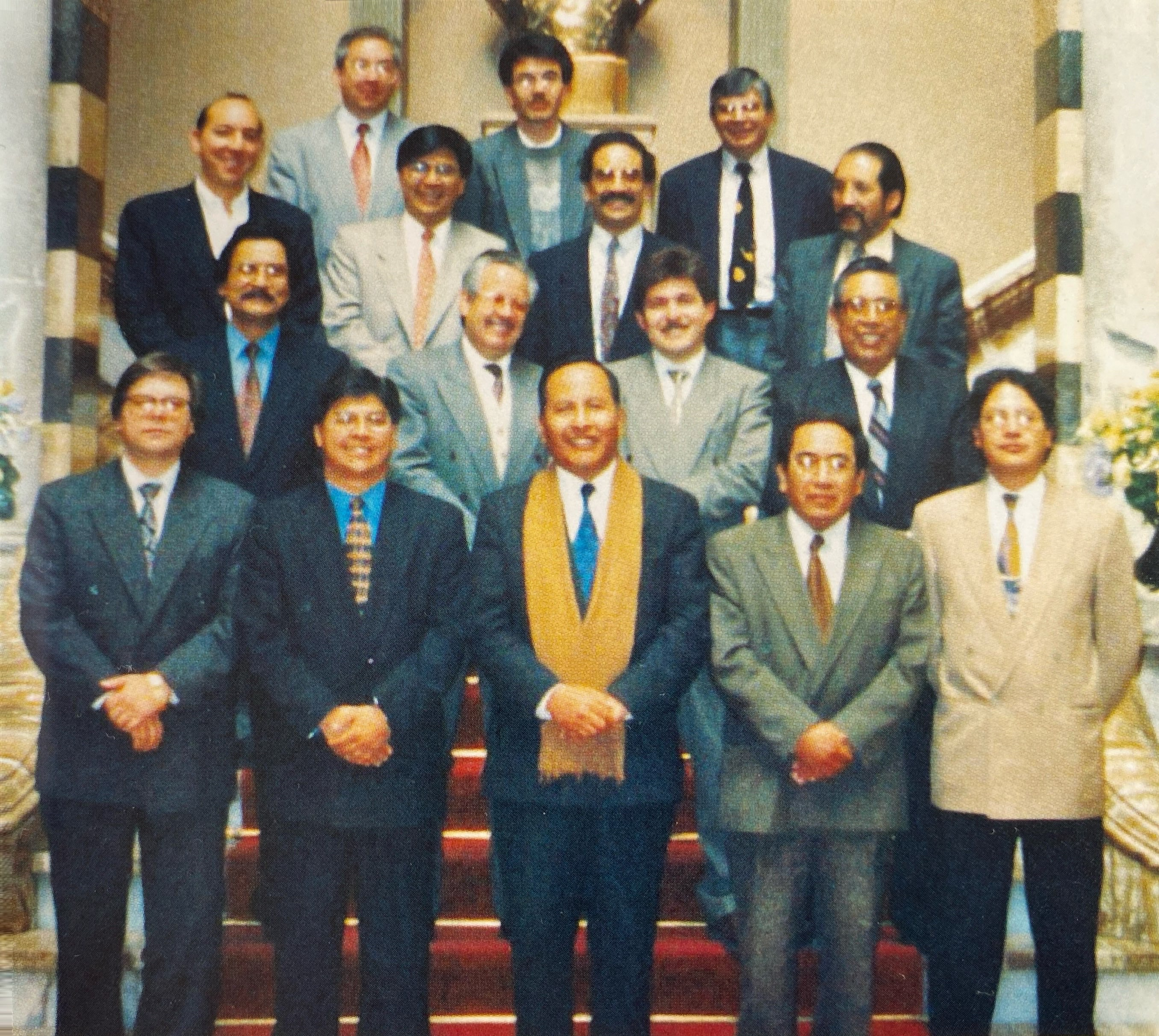
Oporto as part of the Bolivian State Cabinet in 1995.

He served as Minister of Sustainable Development and Planning, and previously as Deputy Minister of Planning and Territorial Management, both positions held during the second term of Gonzalo Sánchez de Lozada. He also served as Chief of State Affairs for the Vice Presidency during Sánchez de Lozada’s first term. In 2020, he was appointed Chief of Staff at the Ministry of Productive Development and Plural Economy under the interim government of Jeanine Áñez.

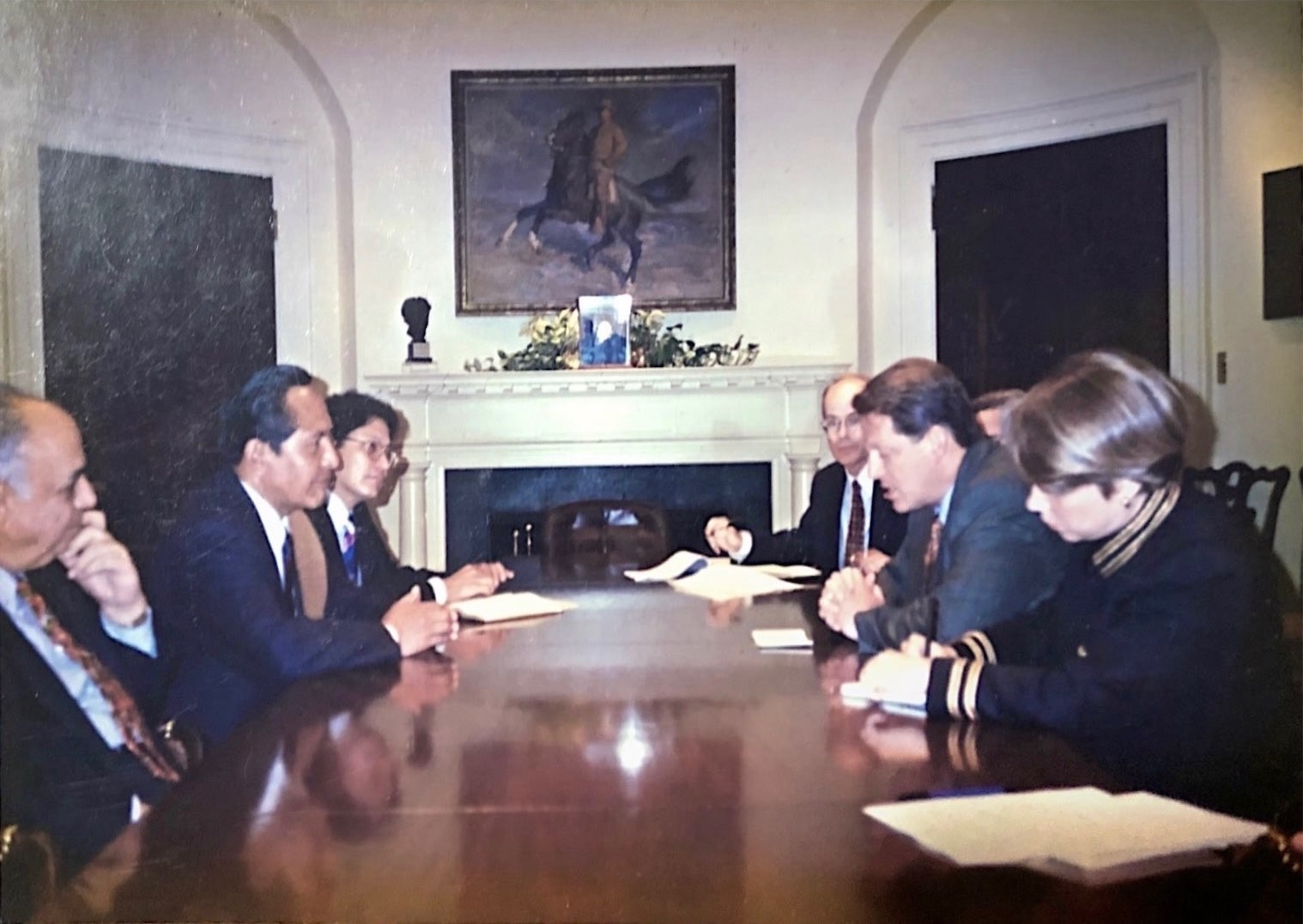
Oporto with U.S. Vice President Al Gore and Bolivian Vice President Víctor Hugo Cárdenas at the White House in 1996.

He was Director of the National Governance Program and a researcher at the Vicente Pazos Kanki Foundation. In parallel, he ventured into the business world.

Currently, he is the Executive Director of the Milenio Foundation, recognized for annually presenting the Milenio Report on the Economy of Bolivia, a key reference for governmental and business project development.

== Books ==
Oporto has authored several literary works:

- 1983. University: Crisis of Hegemony.
- 1991. The Democratic Revolution: A New Way of Thinking About Bolivia.
- 1998. Reinventing Government: State Reform and Governance in Bolivia.
- 2009. Storming Heaven.
- 2010. Water and Power.
- 2012. A New Course: Politics and Society.
- 2013. Back to the State Mining Model?
- 2014. Bolivia: Crossroads in the 21st Century.
- 2017. The End of Populism: What Comes Next?
- 2018. How Are We? An Essay on the National Character of Bolivians.
