= Ciudad Universitaria (Madrid Metro) =

Madrid Metro station

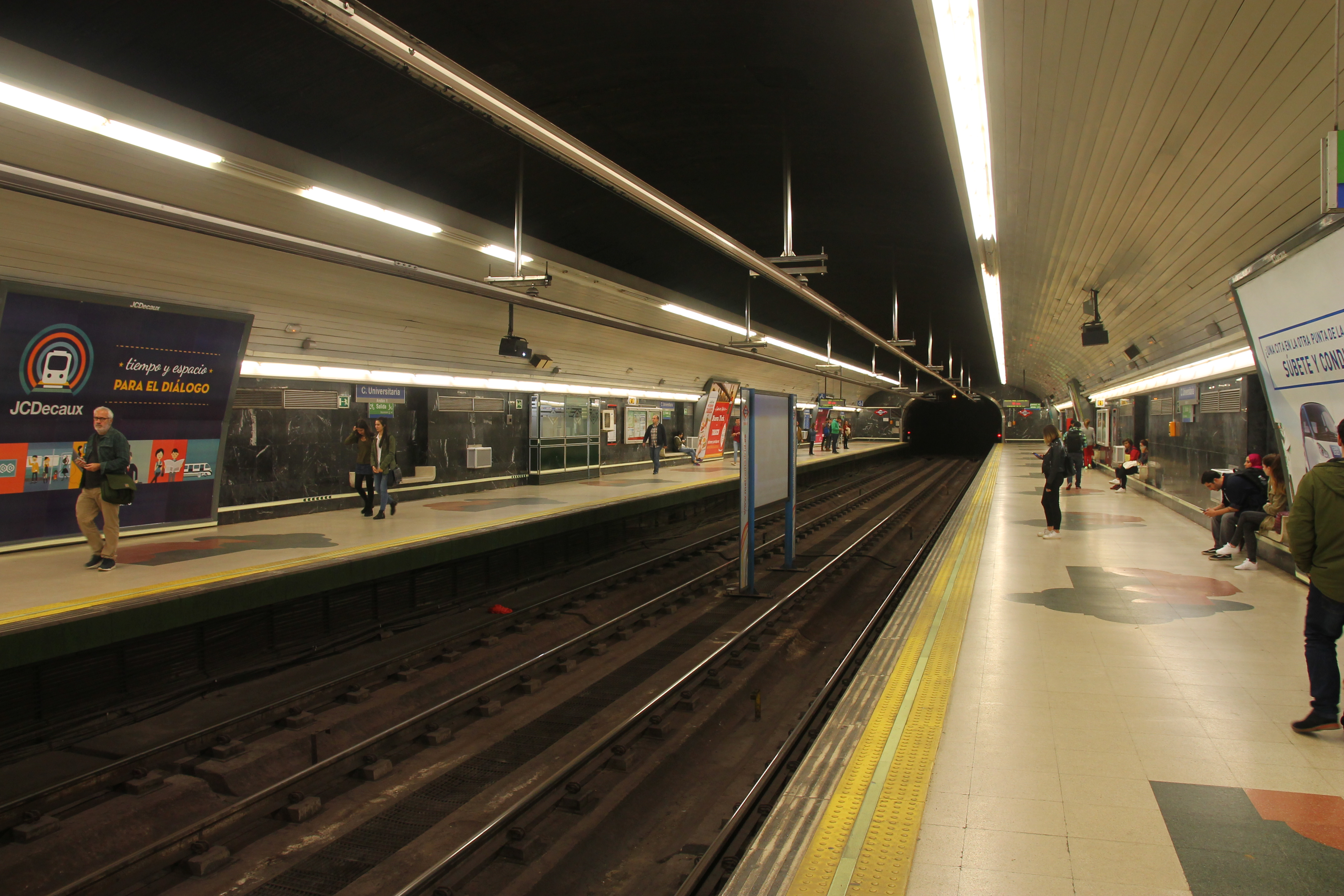
- Platforms of the station

General information
- Location: Moncloa-Aravaca, Madrid; Spain
- Coordinates: 40.4435602°N 3.7267881°W
- System: Madrid Metro station
- Owner: CRTM
- Operator: CRTM

Construction
- Accessible: yes

Other information
- Fare zone: A

History
- Opened: 13 January 1987

Services
Preceding station	Madrid Metro	Following station
Vicente Aleixandre clockwise / outer	Line 6	Moncloa anticlockwise / inner
Location
- Location within Madrid

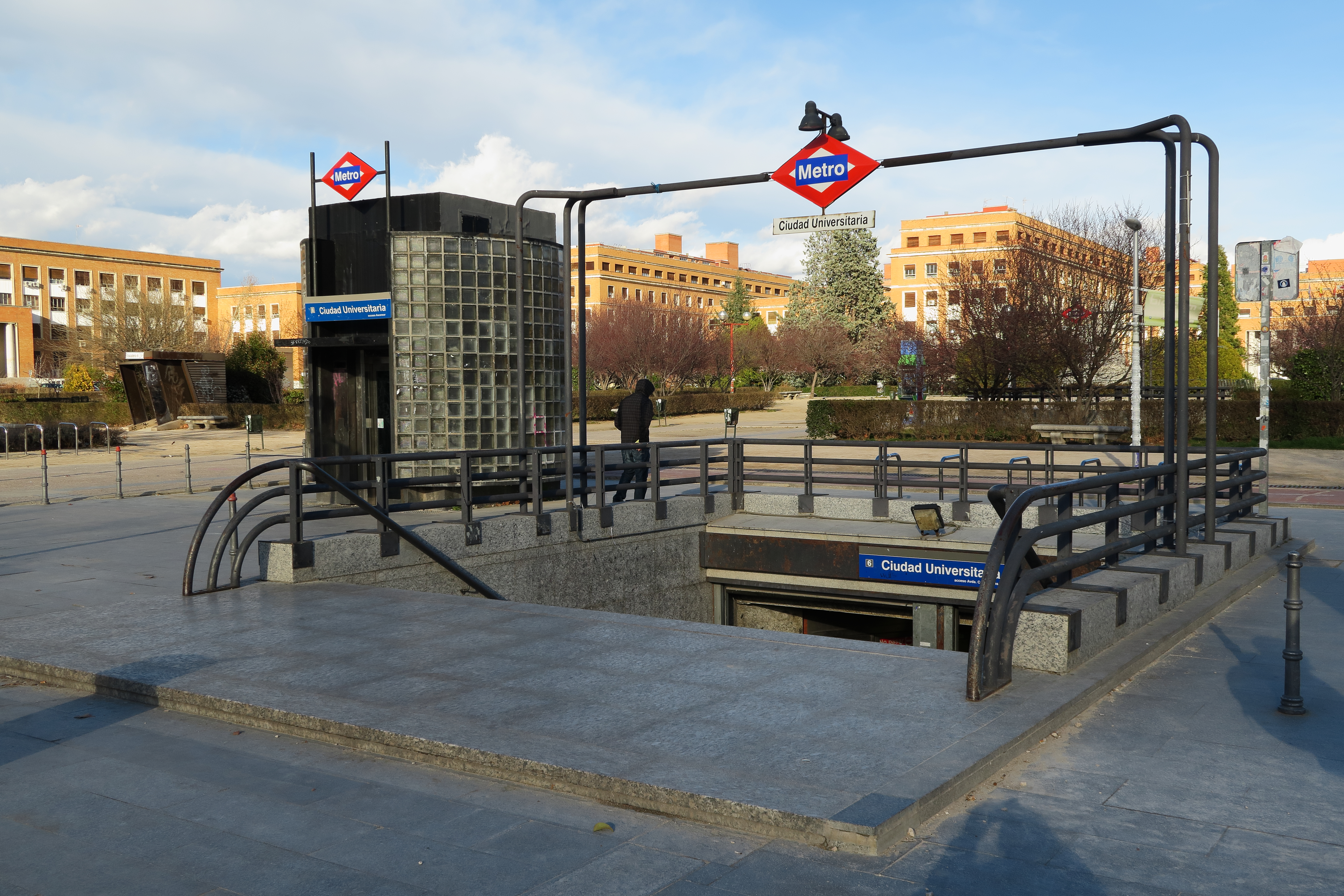
Station entrance on Complutense avenue

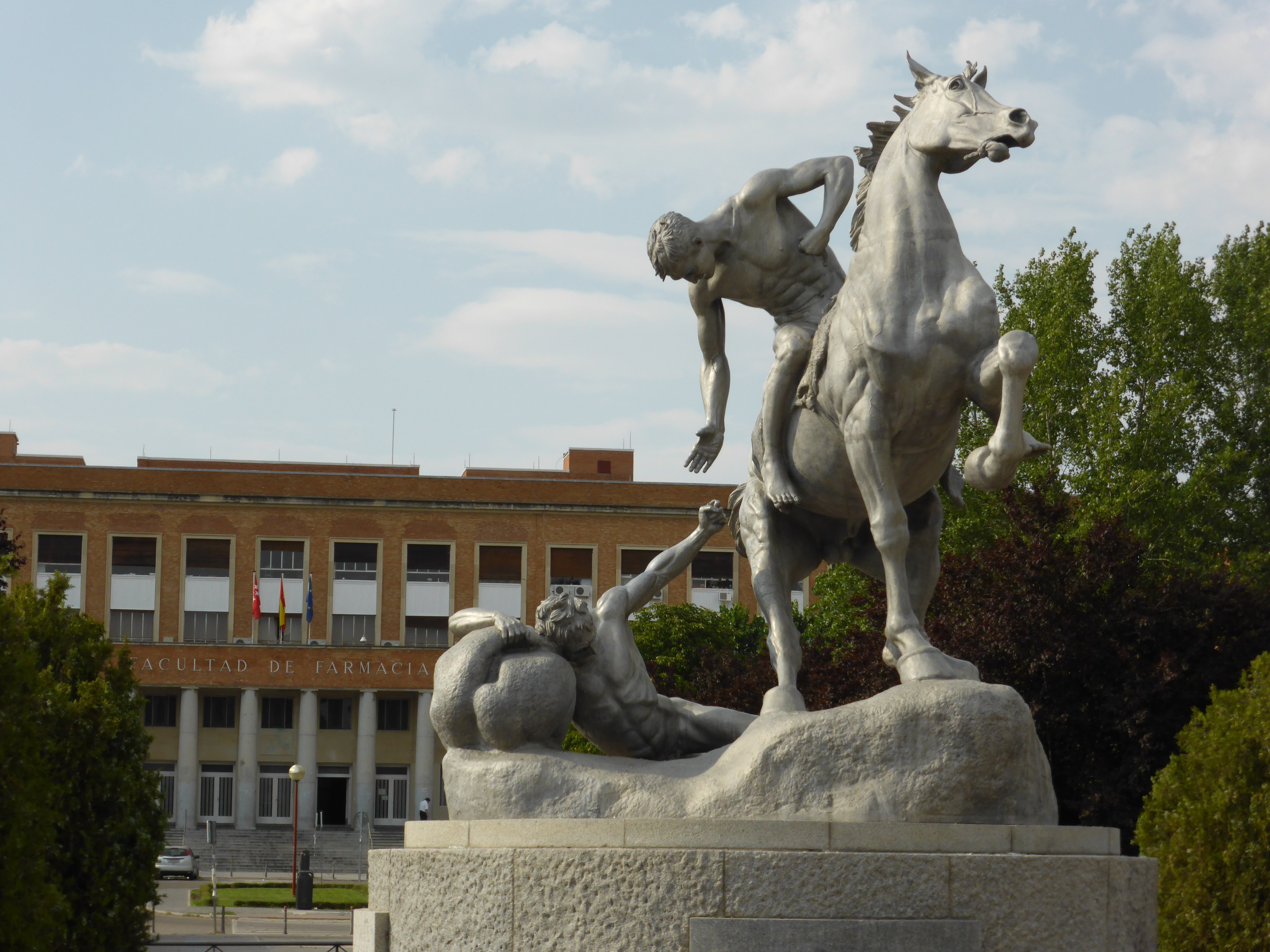
The Torch Bearers statue by Anna Hyatt Huntington located next to the Facultades entrance

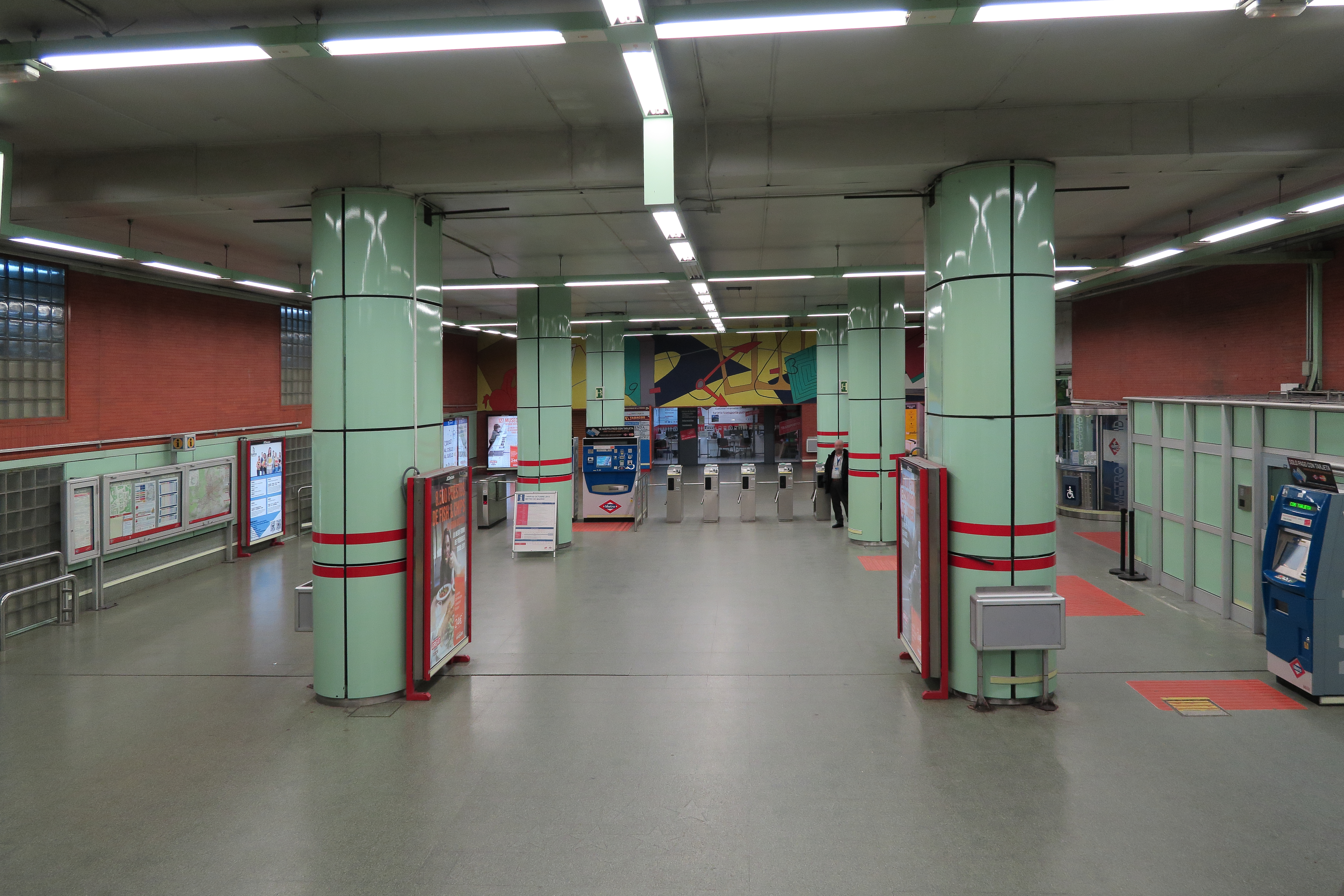
Station vestibule

Ciudad Universitaria ([θjuˈðað uniβeɾsiˈtaɾja], "University City") is a station on Line 6 of the Madrid Metro, located beneath Complutense avenue in the Ciudad Universitaria ward in the Moncloa-Aravaca district in fare Zone A. It is named after the Ciudad Universitaria, which is home to the Complutense University of Madrid, the Technical University of Madrid, and the National University of Distance Education. The station's platforms feature tilework representing the bear and the strawberry tree, which is a symbol of Madrid. The station is located next to the Ciudad Universitaria underground train storage depot, where most of Line 6's 5000 series trains are stored.

== History ==
The station was inaugurated on 13 January 1987 when Line 6 was extended from Cuatro Caminos to Ciudad Universitaria. From its opening until 1995, it had a limited schedule to reflect university hours.

Between 1994 and 1995 the station was remodeled as part of the work to convert Line 6 into a circular route. The vestibule was moved closer to Complutense avenue and elevators were installed to provide accessibility for disabled people.

Between 28 June and 28 August 2014, the section of Line 6 between Vicente Aleixandre (then called Metropolitano) and Moncloa was closed for improvements. The purpose of the works was the replacement of track ballast with concrete and the replacement of a spur to the underground train storage depot. The works were expected to be completed in early September, but they were finished ahead of schedule and the station was reopened on 28 August 2014.
