= Opañel =

Coordinates: 40°23′20″N 3°43′41″W

- City neighborhood
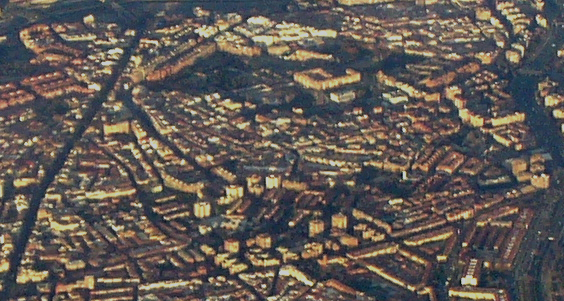

- Country: Spain
- Aut. community: Community of Madrid
- Municipality: Madrid
- District: Carabanchel

Opañel [oˈpa.ɲel] is an administrative neighborhood (barrio) of Madrid belonging to the district of Carabanchel.
