= Vista Alegre (Madrid) =

Coordinates: 40°23′10″N 3°44′20″W

- City neighborhood
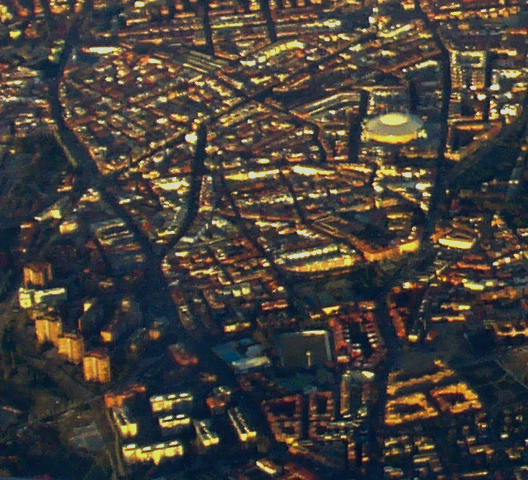

- Country: Spain
- Region: Community of Madrid
- Municipality: Madrid
- District: Carabanchel

Area
  - Total: 1.589877 km^{2} (0.613855 sq mi)

Population (2020)
  - Total: 47,757
  - Density: 30,038/km^{2} (77,799/sq mi)

Vista Alegre [ˈbista aˈleɣɾe] ("Joyful View") is an administrative neighborhood (barrio) of Madrid belonging to the district of Carabanchel. It has an area of 1.589877 km^{2} (0.613855 sq mi). As of 1 February 2020, it has a population of 47,757. The Palacio Vistalegre, a multipurpose arena, is located in the neighborhood.
