= Plaza Elíptica (Madrid Metro) =

Madrid Metro station

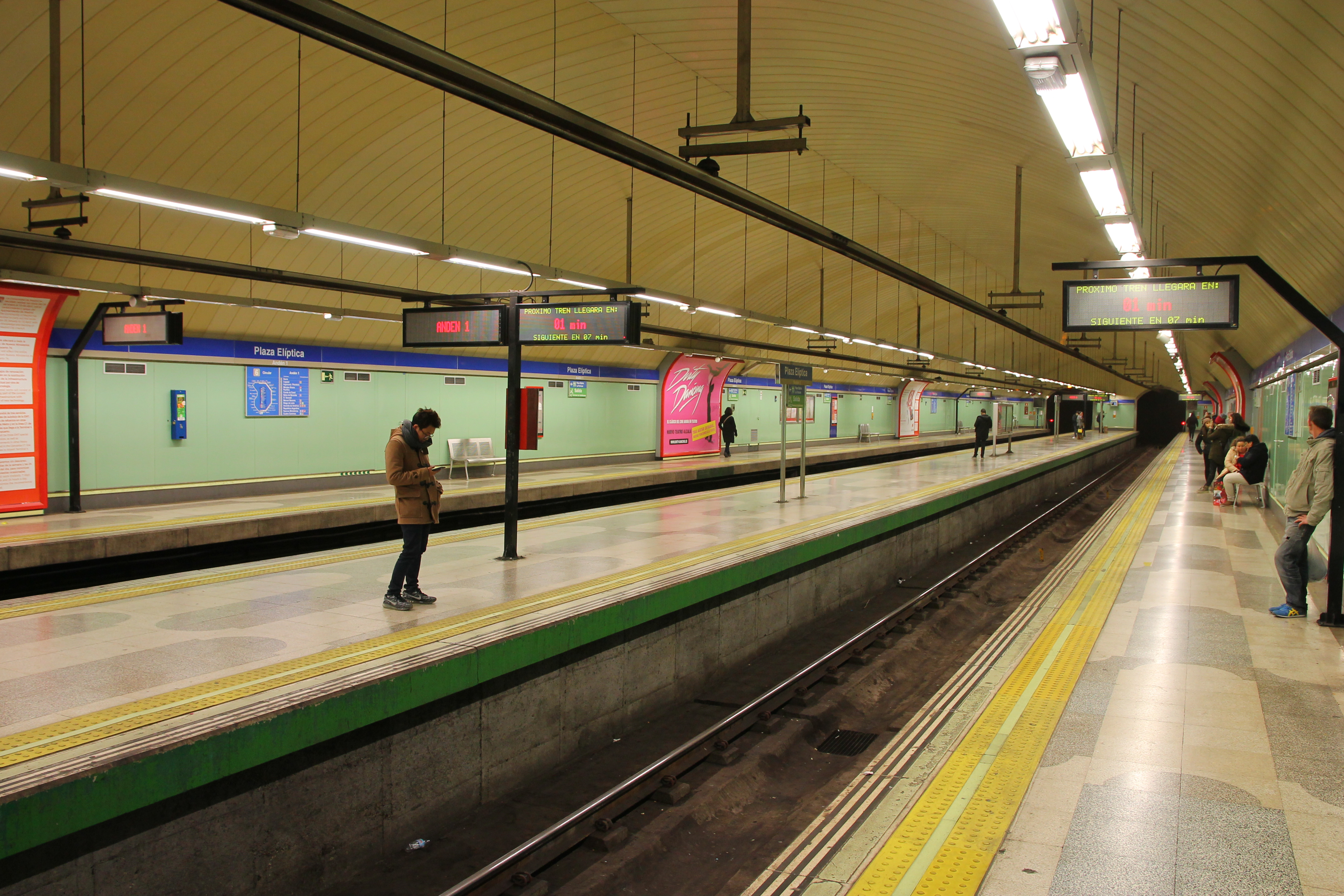
- Platforms of the line 6

General information
- Location: Carabanchel, Madrid; Spain
- Coordinates: 40.3844911°N 3.7183263°W
- System: Madrid Metro station
- Owner: CRTM
- Operator: CRTM

Construction
- Accessible: yes

Other information
- Fare zone: A

History
- Opened: 7 May 1981; 45 years ago

Services
Preceding station	Madrid Metro	Following station
Opañel clockwise / outer	Line 6	Usera anticlockwise / inner
Terminus	Line 11	Abrantes towards La Fortuna
Location
- Location within Madrid

Plaza Elíptica [ˈplaθa eˈliβtika] is a station on Line 6 and Line 11 of the Madrid Metro, under the Plaza Elíptica ("elliptical plaza"). It is located in fare Zone A.
