= La Fortuna (Madrid Metro) =

Madrid Metro station

- Platforms of the station

General information
- Location: Leganés, Madrid; Spain
- Coordinates: 40.3579576°N 3.7778277°W
- System: Madrid Metro station
- Owner: CRTM
- Operator: CRTM

Construction
- Accessible: yes

Other information
- Fare zone: B1

History
- Opened: 5 October 2010; 15 years ago

Services
| Preceding station | Madrid Metro | Following station |
|---|---|---|
| La Peseta towards Plaza Elíptica | Line 11 | Terminus |
Location
- Location within Madrid

La Fortuna [la foɾˈtuna] is a station on Line 11 of the Madrid Metro, serving the La Fortuna barrio. It is located in fare Zone B1.
