= Latina (Madrid) =

Coordinates: 40.411360°N 3.708417°W

- District of Madrid
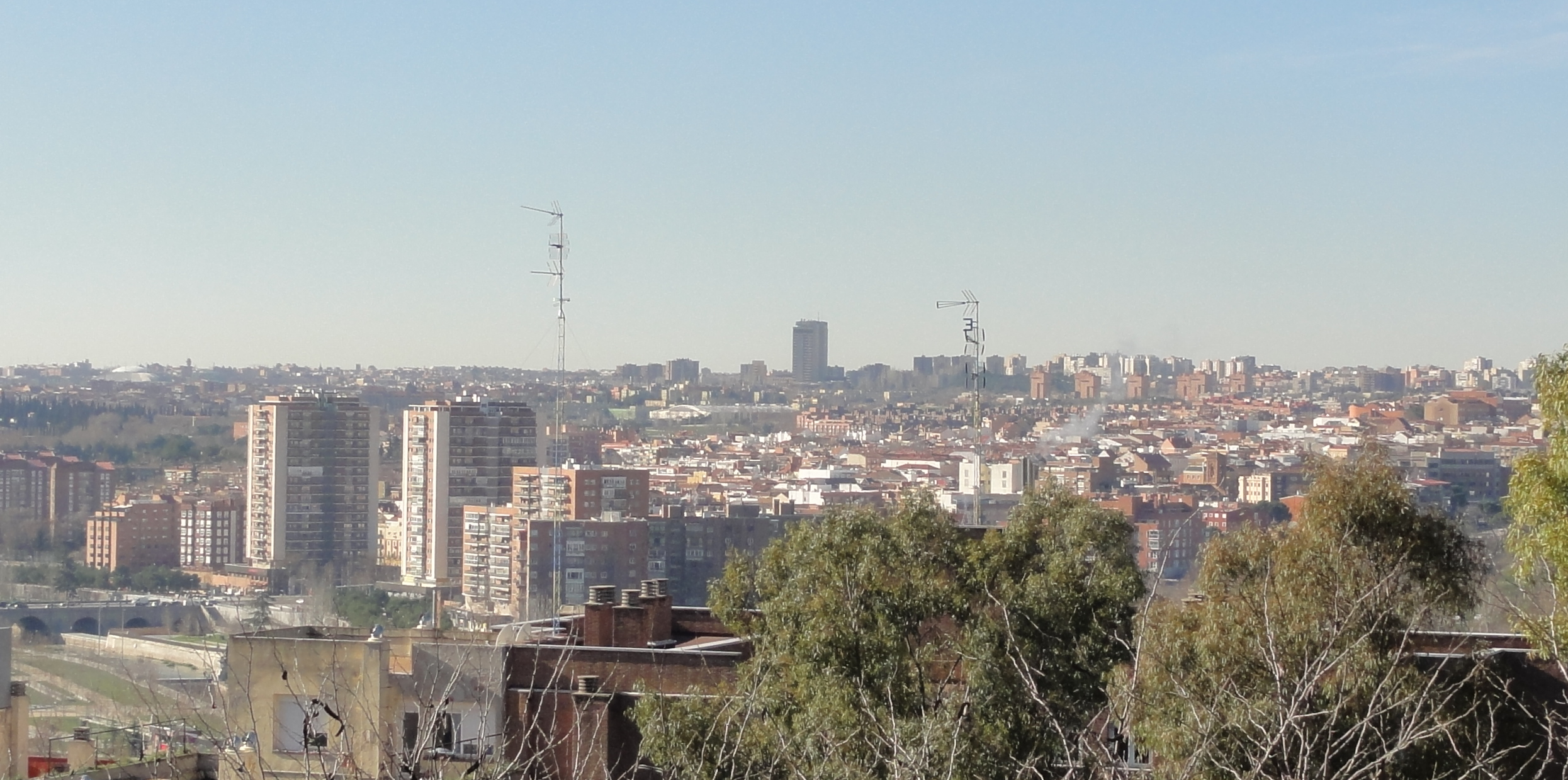

- Interactive map of Latina
- Country: Spain
- Region: Community of Madrid
- Municipality: Madrid

Government
  - Councillor-President: Alberto González Díaz (PP, 2023)

Area
  - Total: 25.41 km^{2} (9.81 sq mi)

Population
  - Total: 256,644
  - Density: 10,097.8/km^{2} (26,153/sq mi)
- Postal code: 28032
- Madrid district number: 10

Latina (Spanish pronunciation: [laˈtina]) is a district of Madrid located in the southwestern corner of the municipality.

== Etymology ==
Its name comes from Beatriz Galindo, La Latina, teacher of Isabella I of Castile.

== Geography ==
=== Position ===
The district, situated in a southwestern part of the municipality, borders with the following districts: Carabanchel, Arganzuela, Centro and Moncloa-Aravaca. It includes the old cross-roads of the road of Extremadura, and it has several tributary streams to Manzanares river (Luche, Caño Roto etc.).

=== Subdivision ===
The district is formed by 7 administrative neighborhoods (barrios): Aluche, Campamento, Cuatro Vientos, Las Águilas, Lucero, Los Cármenes, Puerta del Ángel.

== History ==
The district is found over Quaternary terrains. There are several promontories in the ground: Bermejo, Cerro de la Piedra, Cerro de los Alemanes, Cerro de los Cuervos, Cerro de la Mica (the highest one) and Cerro Almodóvar.

The district was included in the 1845 administrative division of Madrid in 10 districts. It included all the so-called los Carabancheles districts which were added to the city of Madrid as the district of Carabanchel in 1948. In 1971 that district was divided in the three current districts: Usera, Carabanchel and Latina.

== Government ==
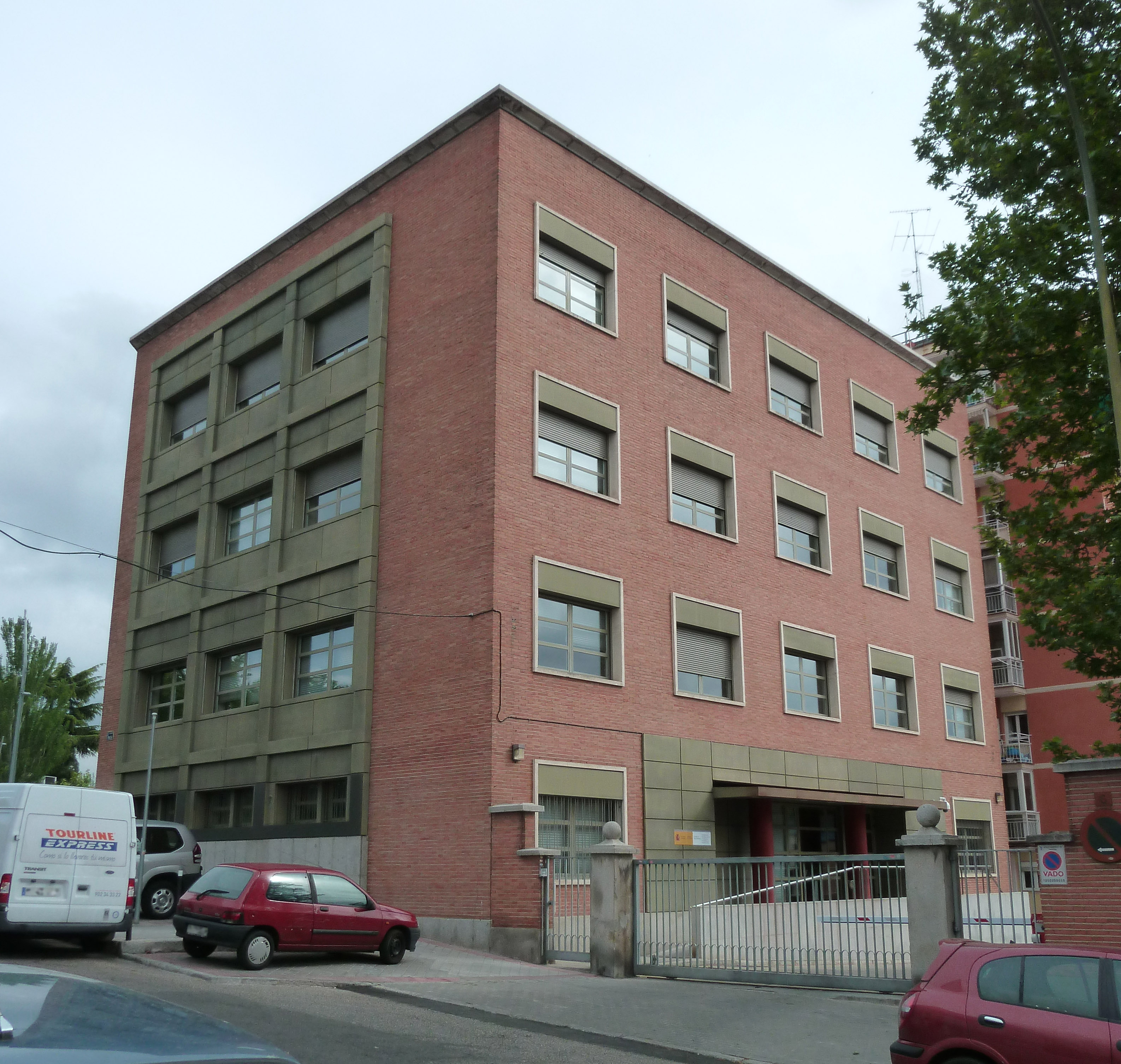
Civil Aviation Accident and Incident Investigation Commission headquarters

The Civil Aviation Accident and Incident Investigation Commission has its headquarters in Latina.

== Transport ==
- Cercanías train line C-5. Stations: Aluche, Cuatro Vientos, Fanjul, Laguna and Las Águilas.
- Madrid Metro: Lines 5 & 10.

== Public services, interesting places ==
- Parque de Aluche.
- Centro Comercial Aluche
- Junta Municipal de Distrito
- Colegio Público de Educación Especial Fray Pedro Ponce de León.
- Polideportivo municipal de Aluche.
