= Carabanchel =

Coordinates: 40.38367°N 3.72799°W

- District
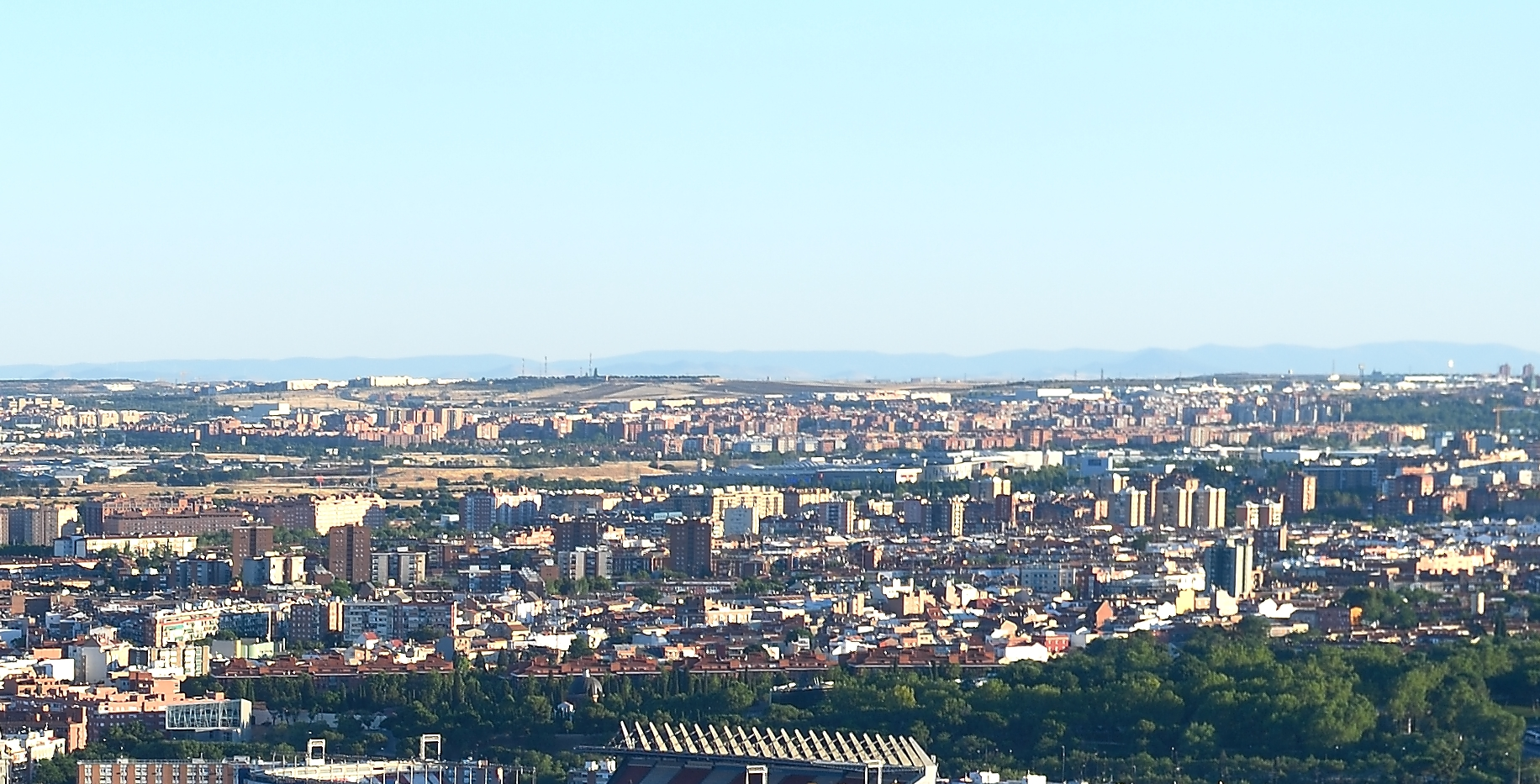
- Interactive map of Carabanchel
- Country: Spain
- Aut. community: Madrid
- Municipality: Madrid

Government
  - Councillor-President: Carlos Izquierdo Torres (PP, 2023)

Area
  - Total: 14 km^{2} (5.4 sq mi)

Population
  - Total: 253,678
  - Density: 16,524/km^{2} (42,800/sq mi)
- Postal code: 28032

Carabanchel (Spanish pronunciation: [kaɾaβanˈtʃel]) is a district of Madrid, Spain. It lies on the southern (right) bank of the Manzanares, spanning southward down to the M-40 ring road. The district is made up of the neighbourhoods of Abrantes, Comillas, Opañel, Puerta Bonita, San Isidro and Vista Alegre.

== Overview ==
The area was the scene of fierce fighting during the Spanish Civil War -especially in November 1936, during the Battle of Madrid, when Nationalist troops tried to fight their way into the area. Unaccustomed to street fighting, they took heavy casualties. For the remainder of the Siege of Madrid, the front lines ran through the streets of Carabanchel, until Republican Madrid fell in March 1939.

It was home of Spain's most notorious prison (Carabanchel Prison), which housed many political prisoners during the Franco era. The prison was closed in 1998.

Carabanchel is among the most diverse neighborhoods in the country, with a large population of immigrants, mostly from North Africa but also some from South America and Eastern Europe, as well as native-born Spaniards.

The Gómez Ulla Military Hospital, formerly known as Hospital de Carabanchel, is located in the area.

== Sports ==
The local football teams are the RCD Carabanchel, It is the third oldest team in the capital, after Real Madrid and Atlético Madrid, and the thirteenth oldest in Spain and CD Puerta Bonita that reached Segunda División B in 2013.

The highest level reached by RCD Carabanchel was the Segunda División B and on various occasions, the team has come close to promotion to the Segunda División.

== Geography ==
=== Subdivision ===
The district is administratively divided into 7 neighborhoods (barrios):

- Abrantes
- Buenavista
- Comillas
- Opañel
- Puerta Bonita
- San Isidro
- Vista Alegre

== See also ==
- Carabanchel Bajo
- RCD Carabanchel
