= Usera Tunnel scam =

Scam during Spanish Civil War

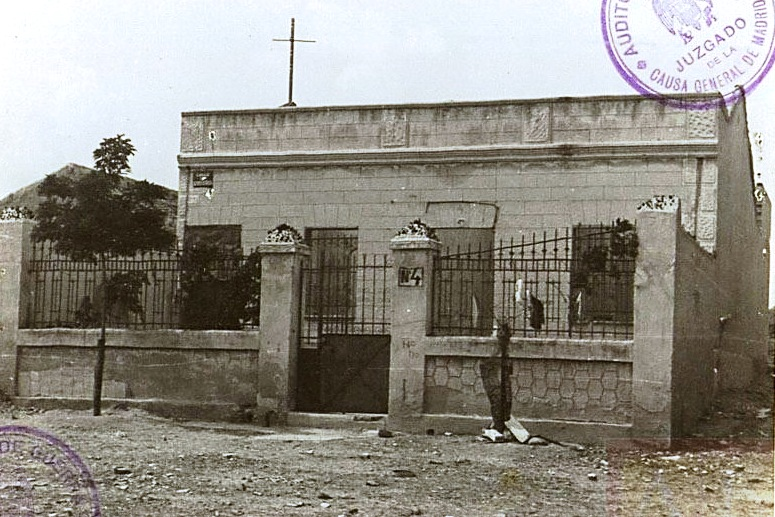
Usera scam detention building

Usera Tunnel (Spanish: Túnel de Usera, also Spanish: Túnel de la muerte) was a scam operated by Republican security units during the Spanish Civil War. It took place in Madrid between mid-October and mid-November 1937. Its objectives were twofold; one was to capture supposed supporters of the Nationalists, who were hiding in Madrid, mostly in premises of foreign diplomatic missions; another was to enrich the scammers by robbing the victims of money and valuables. The scammers floated rumors about an underground tunnel, allegedly located in the Madrid suburb of Usera and running below the frontline to the Nationalist-held sector. Posing as corrupted Republican militiamen they lured at least 67 individuals, who were imprisoned, robbed and killed in army premises near the frontline. Three individuals charged with operating the scam were later apprehended and executed in Francoist Spain; one more died in prison. Casimiro Duran Muñoz, the officer deemed to have been the chief engineer of the project, was last seen in 1938 and his later fate is unknown.

== Refugees ==
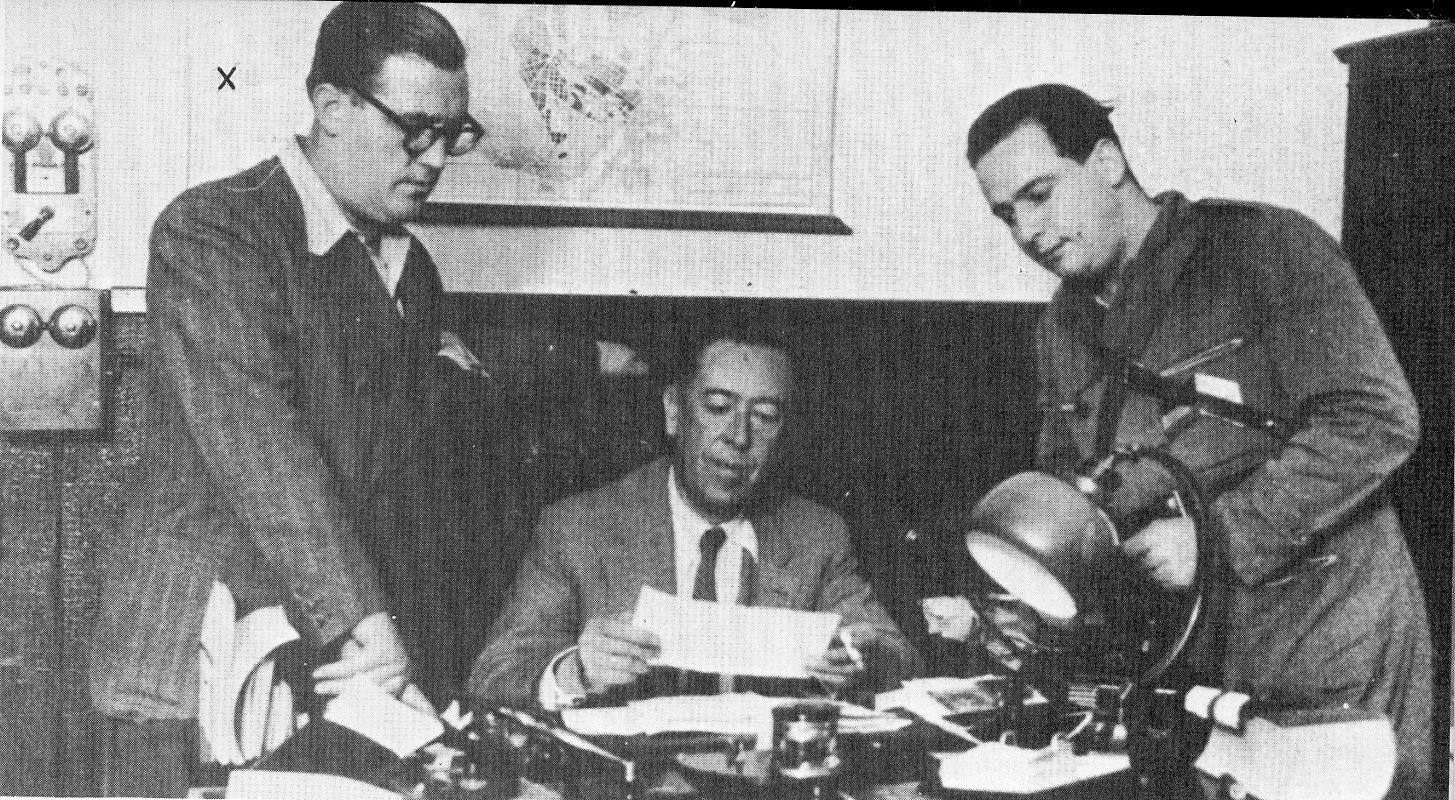
top Madrid security officials, 1936

During the outburst of revolutionary violence in the summer of 1936 numerous individuals who feared for their life sought shelter in diplomatic premises of foreign countries; their number is currently estimated at 13,000. They included the most endangered categories, like military, religious or aristocracy, though also anyone who for one reason or another considered himself a would-be target of violence. In revolutionary chaos the legations of Turkey, Finland and Peru were stormed by the militias, some embassies – e.g. this of Argentina – narrowly managed to avoid having been ransacked. Once some order has been restored, Republican structures mounted schemes to get hold of the refugees – widely deemed to have been fascists, fifth-column members and right-wing criminals - in some other way. In the autumn of 1936 counter-espionage security units ran a trap in form of a fictitious embassy of Siam, while other units organized a false evacuation from the Finnish legacy. Following a spate of articles in foreign press which agonized about atrocities in revolutionary Madrid, early next year the Republican government tried to improve its international image and started to allow evacuation of small groups from selected legations. However, in mid-1937 there were still thousands of refugees trapped in foreign missions; in October 1937 Negrín estimated their number at 20,000.

== Usera area ==
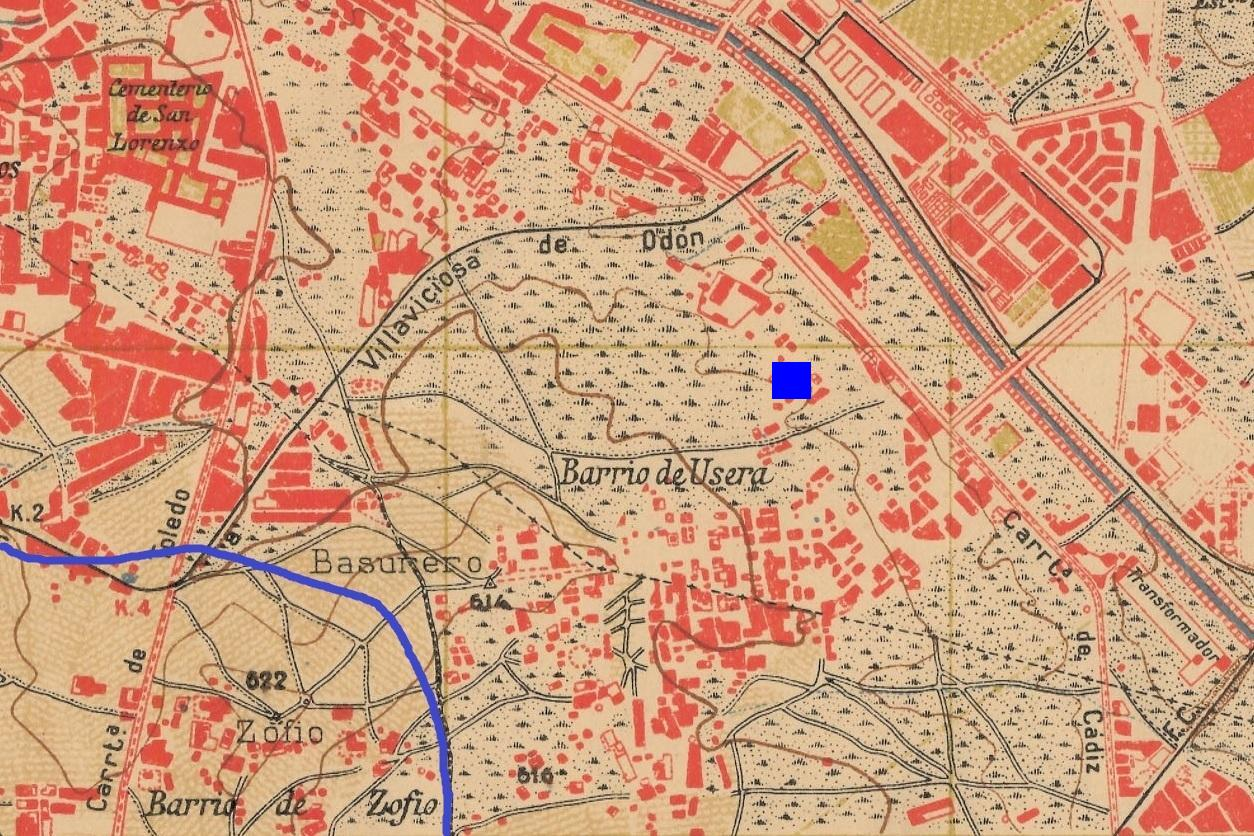
Usera in 1930s with frontline and dungeons marked in blue

In the mid-1930s Usera was located at the south-western outskirts of Madrid. As a suburban area it did not form part of the capital, separated from the city by the Manzanares river; in administrative terms most of it belonged to the municipality of Villaverde. Usera’s backbone was a road leading from Plaza de Legazpi in Madrid towards Carabanchel. In its eastern section it was a busy street with tram track from Legazpi and within an urban neighborhood, formed by perpendicular minor streets and low, at best two-storey buildings. In the western section it was barely more than a country road, running through the Basurero barren. A large new quarter, known as Colonia Salud y Ahorro and composed of residential blocks, was located some 0.5 km to the north. The remaining part was largely uninhabited or under development. In early November 1936 the Nationalist troops advanced towards the western part of Usera and seized the hamlet of Zofío. Then the frontline largely stalled along what is now Avenida de Rafaela Ybarra, at the time amidst sparsely developed and half-rural area. Both armies dug in, and some – occasionally fierce - fighting was taking place for positions named "Casa Derruida", "Trinchera de la Muerte" and "Vértice Basurero" until the summer of 1937.

== Plot ==
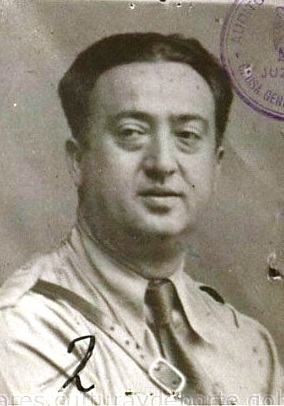
Casimiro Duran

Since January 1937 the Republican unit which manned the frontline in Usera was the 36. Mixed Brigade, a regular regiment-type unit of the loyalist army composed of 4 battalions, numbered 141 to 144; it formed part of the 4. Infantry Division. Its counter-intelligence officer was captain Casimiro Duran Muñoz, a 32-year-old PCE member who following a spell in rearguard militia was seconded to combat troops. He was busy tracking spies, potential deserters and detractors within own ranks; according to some sources he resolved to provocation and charged few individuals, who were later executed. Some time in September 1937 he arrived at an idea of luring individuals who sought refuge in Madrid diplomatic missions into a trap, and obtained approval from the commander of the Brigade, Justo López de la Fuente. Taking advantage of his network of informers and collaborators Duran floated rumors about corrupted Republican militiamen ready to escort people to an underground tunnel, reportedly running across Usera to the Nationalist-held territory. Duran also posed as a right-winger himself; since September he visited premises suspected of having been frequented by Nationalist supporters, and offered safe passage to the alleged tunnel in return for money or valuables.

== Modus operandi ==
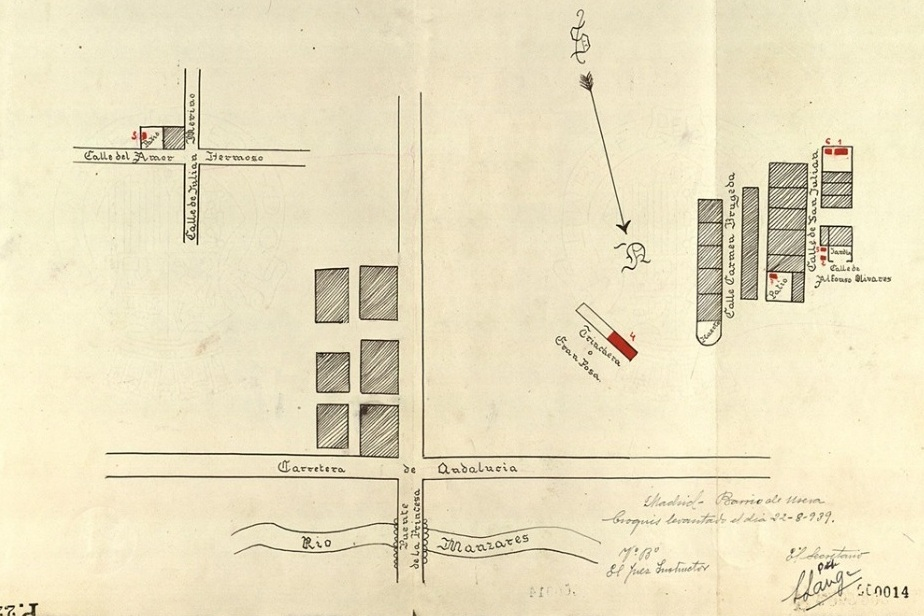
sketch of Usera scam topography

Between October 18 and November 13, 1937, Duran and his men organized an unspecified number of transports from various diplomatic missions or other points in Madrid to Usera; it is known that there were at least 4 drives organized in October, with at least as many in November. Initially single individuals or few people were moved; the largest shipment was the last one and it might have involved 20 people. They were asked to board a truck or other vehicle, with militiamen onboard; following a ride across the city and the Manzanares river the victims were driven to a group of isolated buildings in half-developed area located between Colonia Salud and the center of Usera, at what is now the intersection of Calle Carmen Bruguera and Calle Monederos. The victims realized they had been hoaxed only upon having been thrown into basement vaults, beaten and robbed of all possessions. Most were kept in the dungeons for a few days, some for few weeks; during this period they were forced – by means of intimidation, beating and torture - to write letters which declared they were well and safe in the Nationalist zone, and/or to provide information on other right-wingers hiding in Madrid. Eventually all captives were killed. Bodies were mostly buried in a mass grave few hundred meters away.

== Victims ==
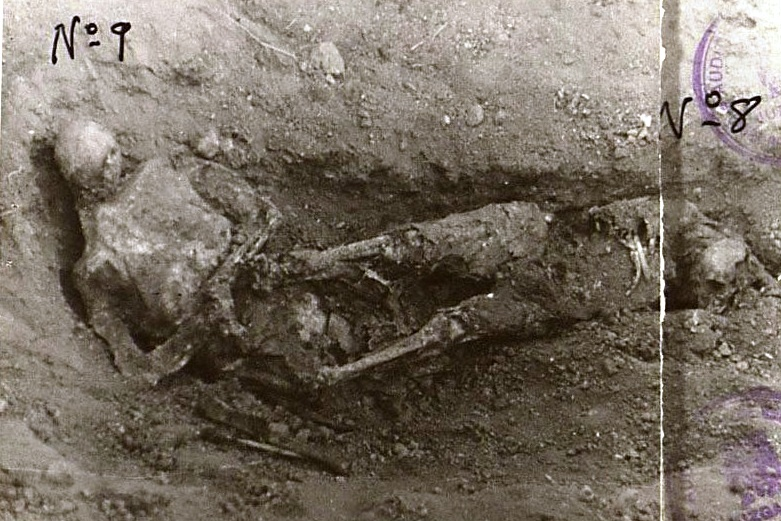
remnants of Usera scam victims

On basis of exhumations carried out in 1939 the Francoist authorities established the number of victims as at least 67 (65 males and 2 females), though some 30 more dismembered or highly decomposed corpses found in the area were also tentatively attributed to the Usera scam. Most victims (36) were shot, some apparently died due to skull and bone fractures, there were also cases of suffocation. Most of the victims had their hands tied up when they died. The investigators concluded that 27 victims were aged 20–30, 17 were aged 30–40, 14 were aged 40–50, 4 were aged 50–60, 2 were below 20 and 1 was above 60. The list of individuals supposed to have died in the Usera scam contained 65 names. Among them there were 5 brothers from the Méndes y González Valdés family and 2 brothers from the aristocratic Urquijo y Landecho family. There were 11 students among the victims, followed by 10 engineers, 10 lawyers and 8 career officers; others were also academics, businessmen, religious or landowners. Those highest positioned ones were a member of Tribunal de Casación de Cataluña and a president of civil section of Audiencia Territorial de Madrid. The list included also two marquises and a former goalkeeper of Atletico Madrid.

== Aftermath ==
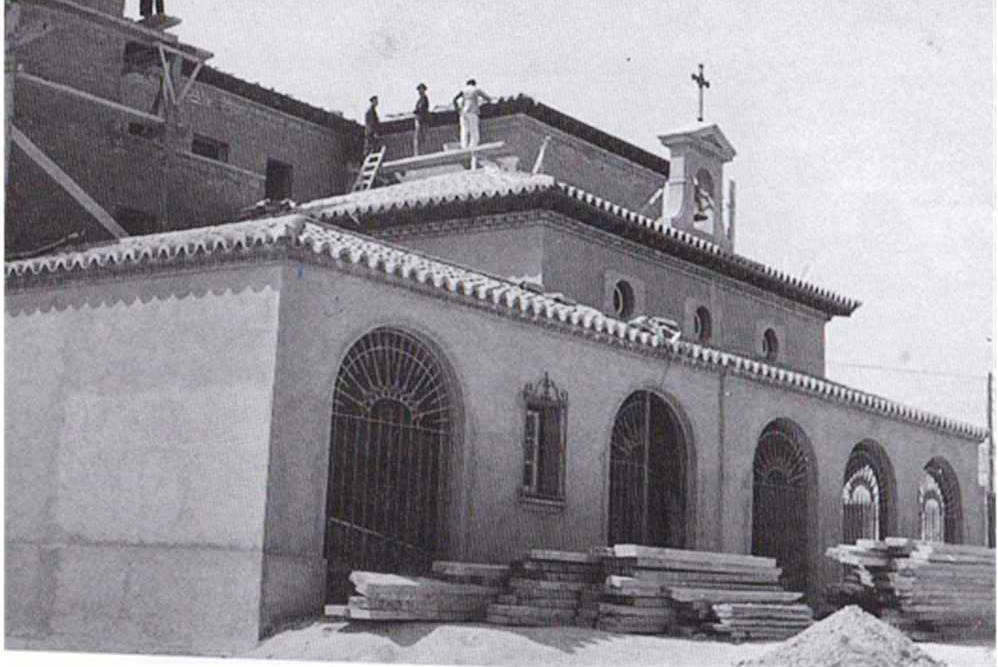
construction of mausoleum

It is not clear why the killings ceased. In 1938 the 36. Mixed Brigade was moved to the Levantine front, where they fought until the Republican defeat. Following the end of the war families of those supposed to have crossed to Nationalist lines by means of the Usera tunnel launched search of their relatives. Already in the summer of 1939 the investigators developed the theory of a tunnel trap. Exhumations led to discovery of the mass grave and single corpses in basements of some buildings; in October 1939 forensic experts from Escuela de Medicina Legal of Universidad Central completed a 26-page report with all 67 remnants found described in detail. In the Francoist propaganda the scam was usually referred to as “Túnel de la muerte”. In 1941 there was a funeral mass organized in the Calatravas church for 62 victims identified, while corpses were mostly re-buried in Cementerio del Este. In 1944 36 positively identified corpses were again exhumed and laid to rest in a basement mausoleum within a newly built religious compound in Usera, where they remain until today. The new list of named victims was compiled in the 1960s by Asociación Oficial de Familiares de los Martíres de Madrid y Su Provincia, which identified 67 individuals.

== Perpetrators ==
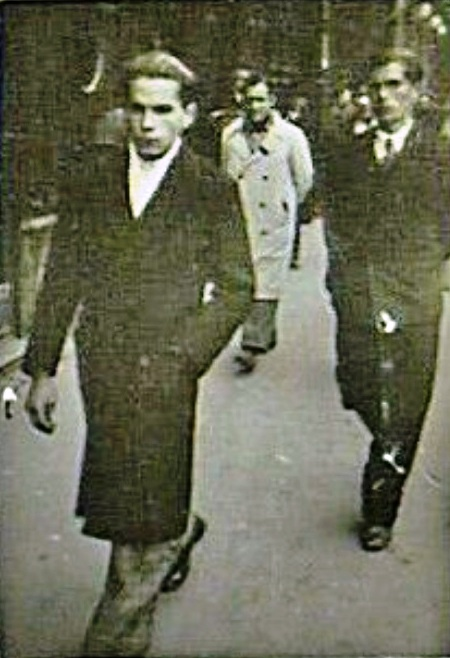
one of supposed perpetrators

It is believed that some soldiers or militiamen engaged in the scheme died in combat in 1938-1939. Three individuals who survived the war and were captured by the Nationalist security stood trial, charged with murder related to the Usera scam; Valeriano Montero Talaván (commander of the 141. battalion), Antonio Torres Moreno and Andrés Sánchez Frías (both militiamen from 142. battalion) were sentenced to death and executed. Eladio López Poveda, a PCE-delegated political commissar in the 36. Brigade, was sentenced – though not in relation to the Usera scam - and executed in 1941. Commander of the 36. Mixed Brigade, Justo López de la Fuente, went into exile; he returned to Spain in 1963 and was apprehended in 1964. He was sentenced to death, though eventually the capital punishment was commuted to life imprisonment. He died in prison in 1967. The man who organized and executed the scheme, Casimiro Duran, was reportedly last seen in Valencia in September 1938. According to some sources he survived the war and went into exile in France, but there is no confirmed information about his fate. Little or nothing is known about the fate of 5 other individuals, identified by name by Francoist investigators as implicated in the scam.

== Ernest Hemingway and Gustavo Duran ==
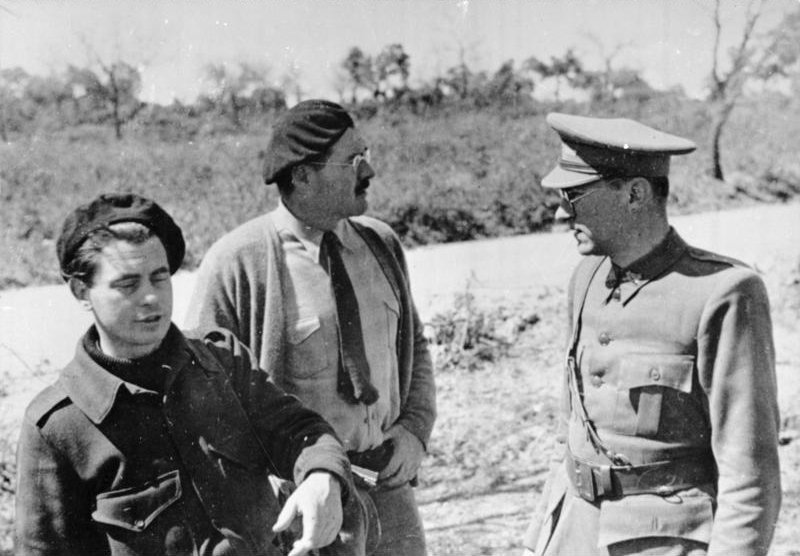
Hemingway (centre), 1937

Ernest Hemingway’s correspondence from Spain, dated May 10, 1938, contains a reference to a brigade nick-named “The Moles of Usera”, which garrisoned the area; Hemingway notes last having been “with them” in December 1937. In For Whom the Bell Tolls, published in 1940, the key protagonist Robert Jordan, a SIM operative, recollects having shot two unarmed fascists, captured in Usera. Both texts gave rise to speculation that Hemingway might have been aware of the Usera scam at the time when it was unfolding. These speculations have never been conclusively either confirmed or denied. In his famous novel Hemingway made also numerous references (unrelated to Usera) to Gustavo Duran Martínez, a real-life commander of the Madrid SIM between August and October 1937. In the 1940s Duran (already a US citizen) was investigated by the Francoist administration and FBI as possibly involved in the Usera scam, but no link has been established. In a 1961 letter to Hugh Thomas, the author of freshly published history of the Spanish civil war, Duran protested the paragraph which referred the Usera scam and declared it based on faked Causa General documents; this intervention added to confusion. Until today some publications refer Gustavo Duran as the one responsible for the Usera scheme.

== In historiography ==
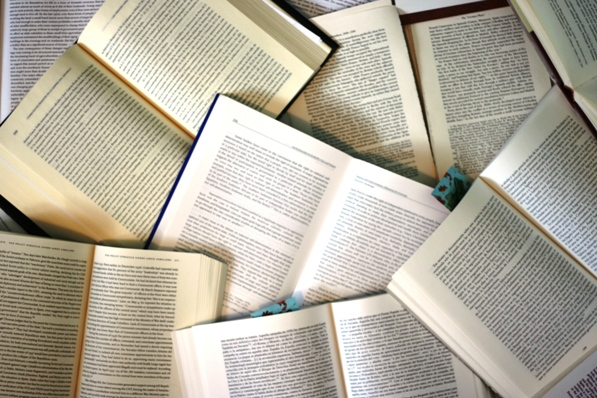

Apart from the extensive Causa General documentation, the Usera scam has been treated in few articles in popular periodicals, has been dedicated a text published by Fundación Nacional Francisco Franco and features in detail on some private websites. It has not earned a scientific monograph so far. In historiography it is at times merely mentioned en passant in works dealing with rearguard repression during the Civil War. Since the 1960 controversy related to the work of Hugh Thomas it has been approached very cautiously. Some authors refer the episode in highly circumspect and hypothetical terms as a rather obscure and barely studied case. Others go further and advance doubts; following earlier Duran's skepticism they note that the only source available is the post-war Causa General; they underline that the Francoist investigation can not be trusted as it was biased and it failed to produce conclusive evidence. However, so far a claim that "Túnel de Usera" was invented by the Francoist propaganda has not been advanced. In numerous historiographic works, including these which specifically discuss Madrid during the war, the Usera scam is referred with no reservations; this is also the case of some academic projects. Few works provide misleading details.

== In memory ==
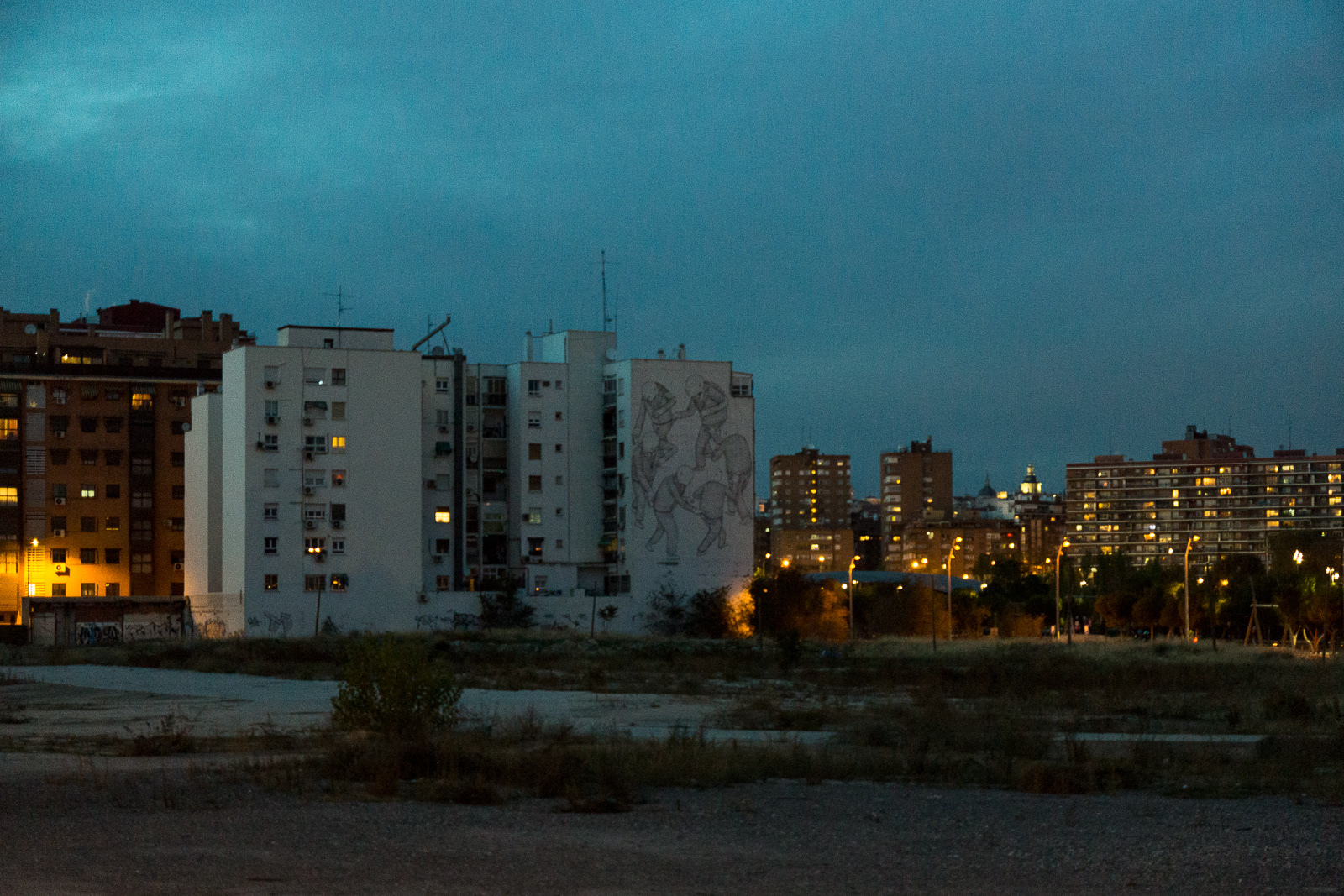
Usera today, new development some 150 m from the scam site

In 2014 Francisco Javier Antón Nárdiz published a novel, loosely based on factual story and titled “El túnel de Usera”. Some private websites, usually of right-wing leaning, maintain sections related to the Usera tunnel trap. Websites or articles dedicated to history or tourism in Usera, which is now a densely built residential district of Madrid known for its Chinese minority, do not mention the tunnel episode. The religious compound, built in the mid-1940s and hosting the underground mausoleum of the Usera scam victims, has been subject to numerous refurbishments during the following decades. Until today it has been occupied by the Theatine Sisters and hosts Colegio de Nuestra Señora de la Providencia, which offers complete education path until the bachillerato. At times the place is visited in relation to the tunnel scam. The mausoleum with remnants of 36 identified victims is not publicly accessible and there are no external markings on the building; there are neither any markings in the Moscardó ward of Usera. Religious service has been held for souls of the deceased every some time and victims of the Usera scam are commemorated also during some general events, intended as part of "la otra memoria". Conservative newspapers at times publish related articles.

== See also ==
- Republican repression in Madrid (1936–1939)
- Justo López de la Fuente

== Footnotes ==
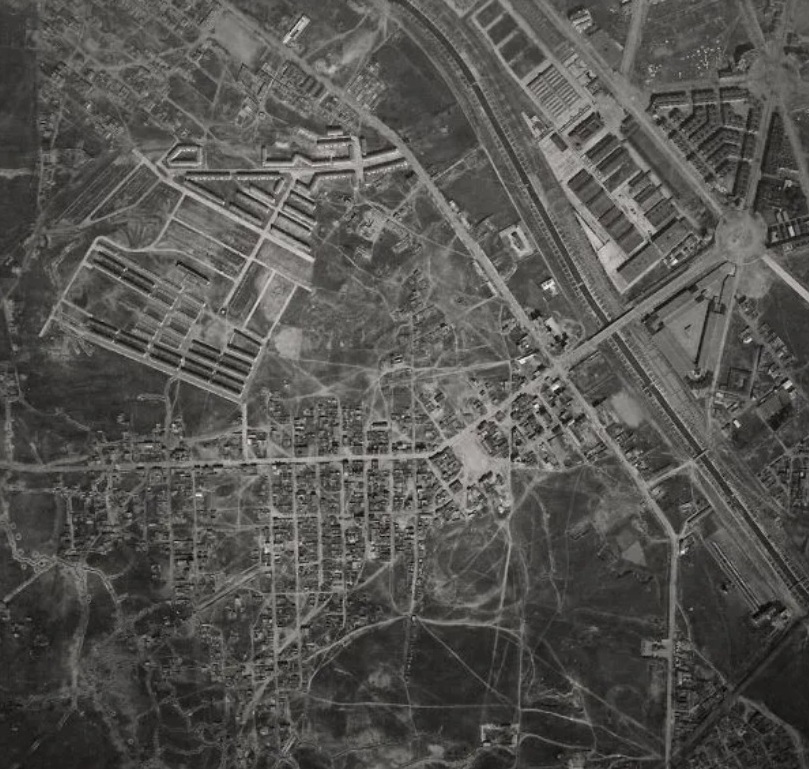
Usera in 1940
