= Estadio Román Valero =

Stadium in Madrid, Spain

Coordinates: 40.38846°N 3.70539°W

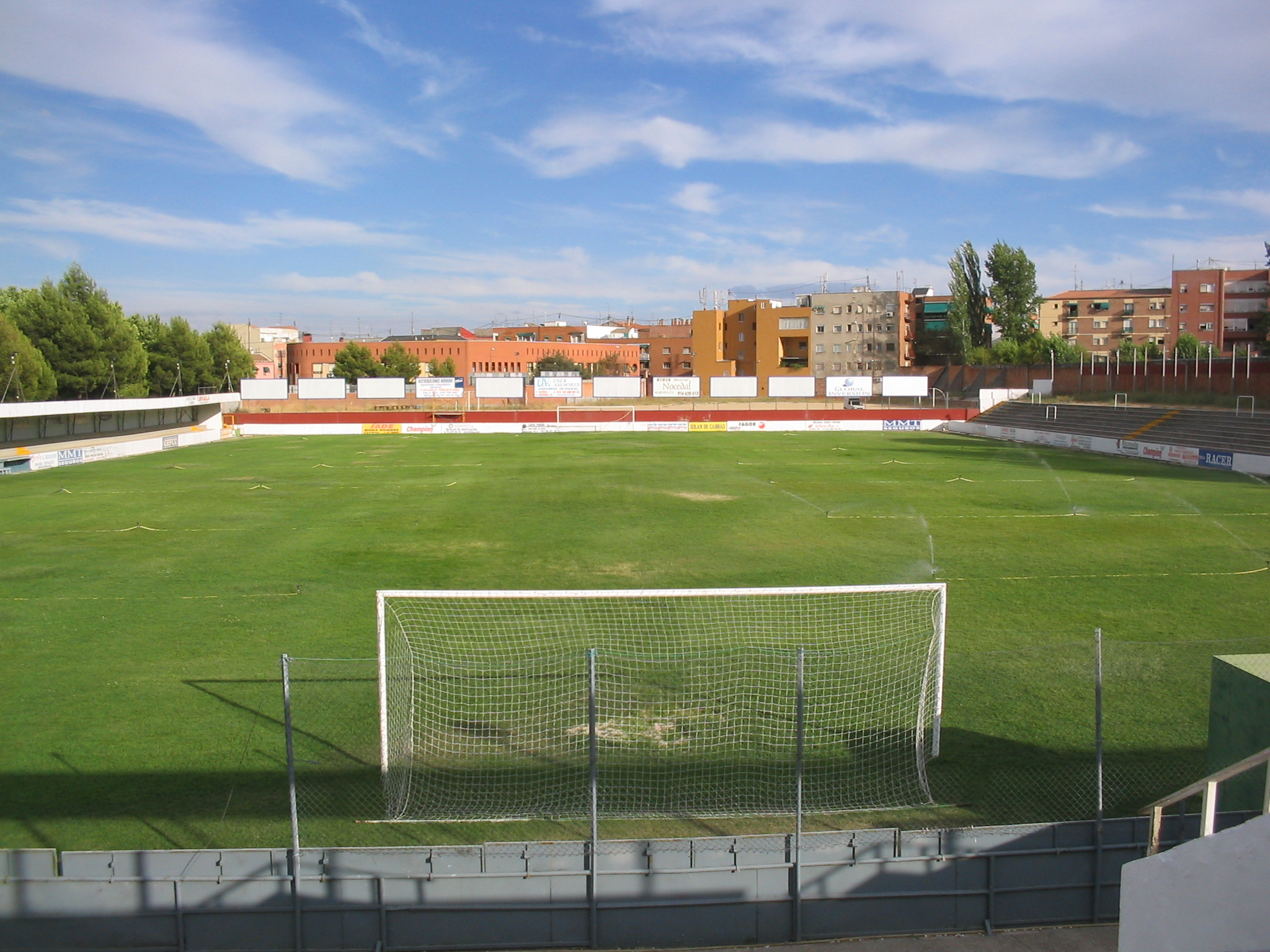
Estadio Román Valero, in 2005.

Estadio Román Valero is a stadium located in Madrid, Spain, that is primarily used for association football. The stadium was built in 1923 and has a capacity of 12,000. CD Colonia Moscardó is one of its tenants. Concerts have also been held at the stadium, including performances by Iron Maiden, Meat Loaf, Judas Priest, Dire Straits, Black Sabbath, Def Leppard, The Police and Whitesnake.

The stadium is located in the Usera district in the south of the city (specifically the Moscardó neighbourhood) and is within two blocks of Usera metro station.
