= San Fermín =

San Fermín or San Fermin may refer to:

- Festival of San Fermín, historically rooted celebration held annually in the city of Pamplona, Navarre
- San Fermín de los Navarros, church located in Madrid, Spain
- San Fermín earthquake, struck the island of Puerto Rico in 1918
- San Fermín-Orcasur, station of the Madrid Metro
- San Fermín (Madrid), ward of Madrid belonging to the district of Usera
- San Fermin (album), self-titled debut album by chamber pop collective San Fermin
- San Fermin (band), American indie rock collective

== See also ==
- Fermín (disambiguation)
