= Matadero Madrid =

Former slaughterhouse turned arts centre in Madrid, Spain

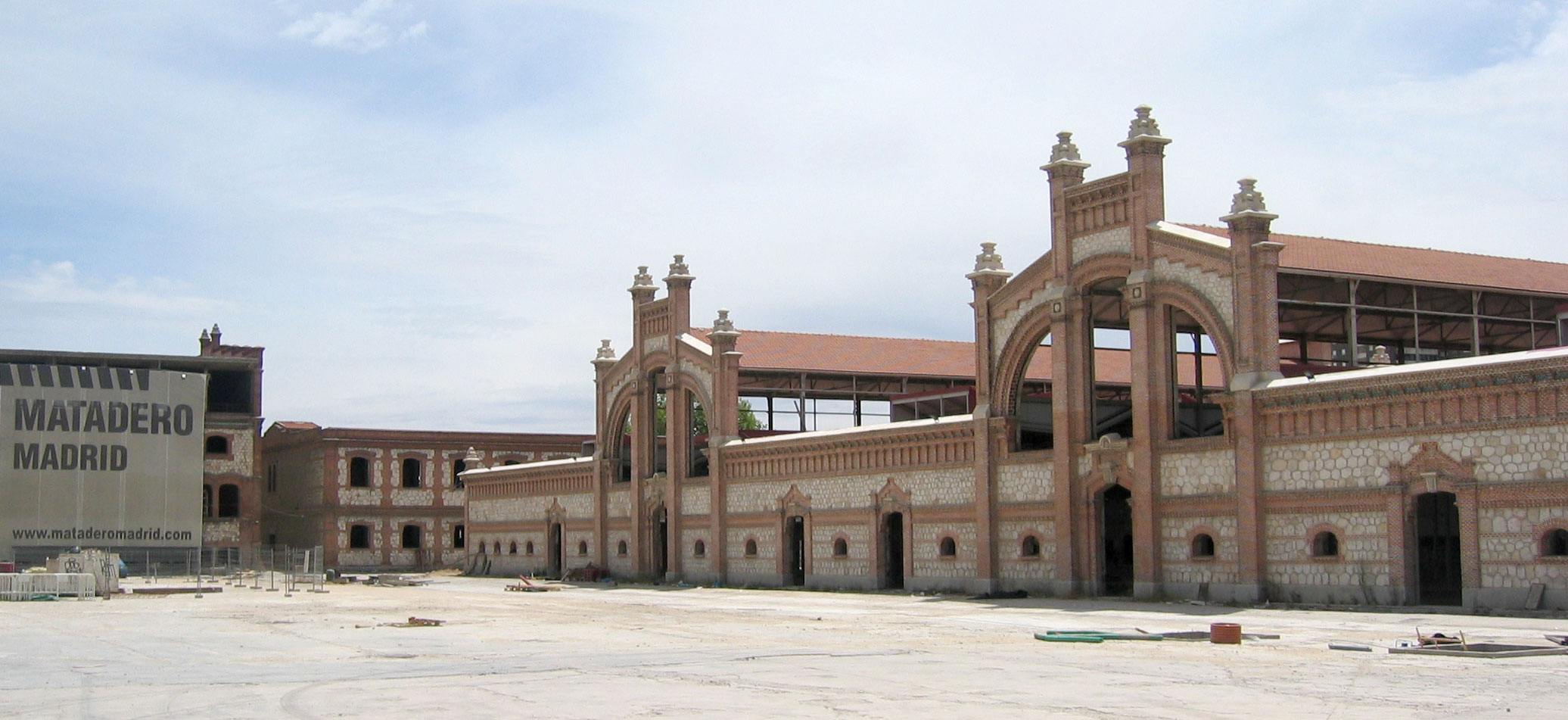

- Location within Madrid
- Established: 2006
- Location: Arganzuela, Madrid, Spain
- Coordinates: 40°23.513′N 3°41.910′W
- Type: Arts centre
- Website: www.mataderomadrid.org/en

Matadero Madrid is the site of a former slaughterhouse, the El Matadero y Mercado Municipal de Ganados (English: Municipal Slaughterhouse and Cattle Market) in the Arganzuela district of Madrid. Today, it is a contemporary arts centre.

== History ==
=== Slaughterhouse ===
Architect Luis Bellido y González was commissioned by the City Council of Madrid to design the complex. The slaughterhouse (in Spanish: matadero) and cattle market were built from 1911 and 1925. The project was structured around a complex of pavilions characterized by functionality, constructive rationality, and conceptual simplicity. There is, however, a historicist element to the architecture, which incorporates Neo-Mudéjar features, such as tiles with abstract designs. The facilities began to be used in 1924 and 1925 and continued operation until the slaughterhouse closed in 1996.

=== Arts centre ===
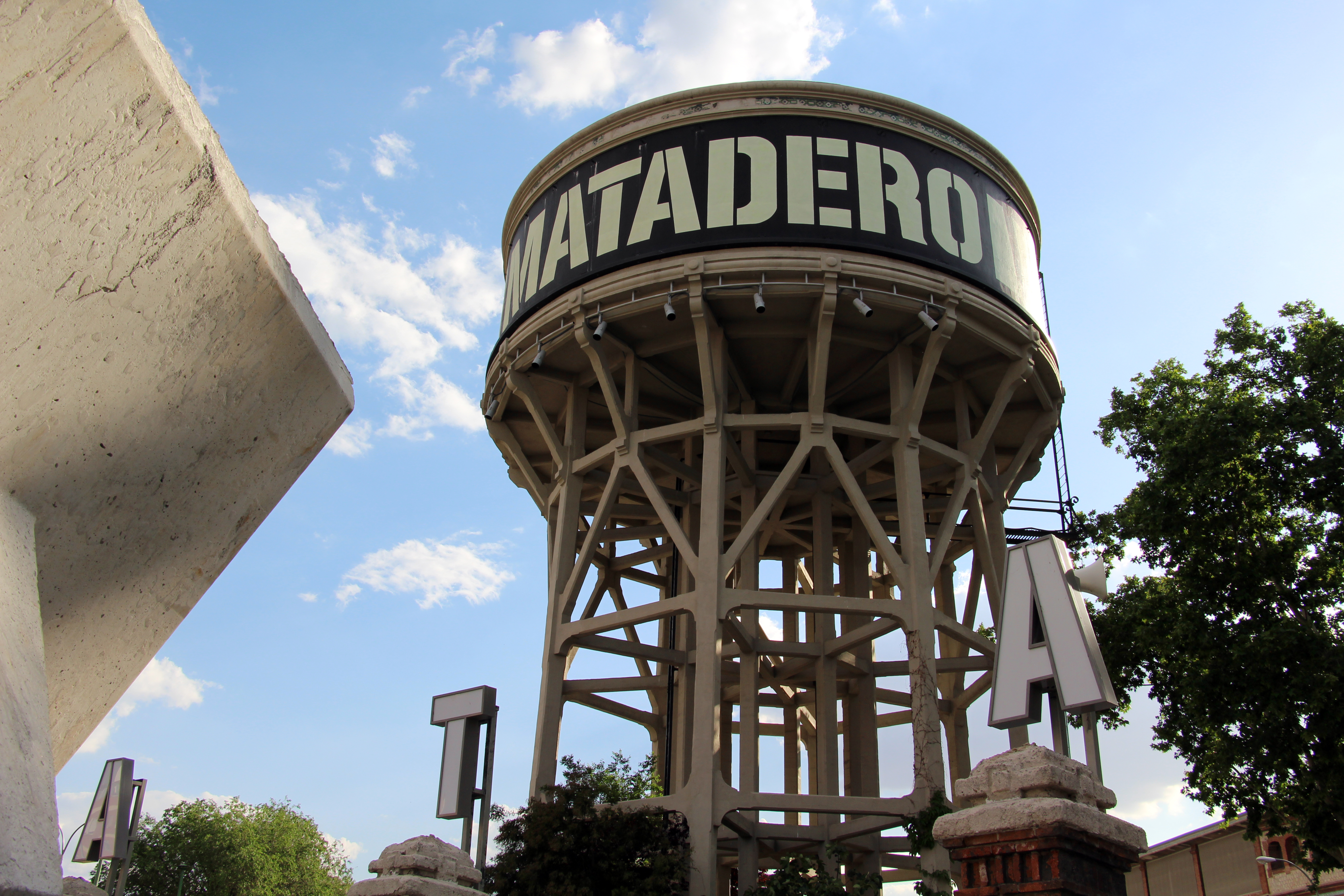
Water tower of Matadero

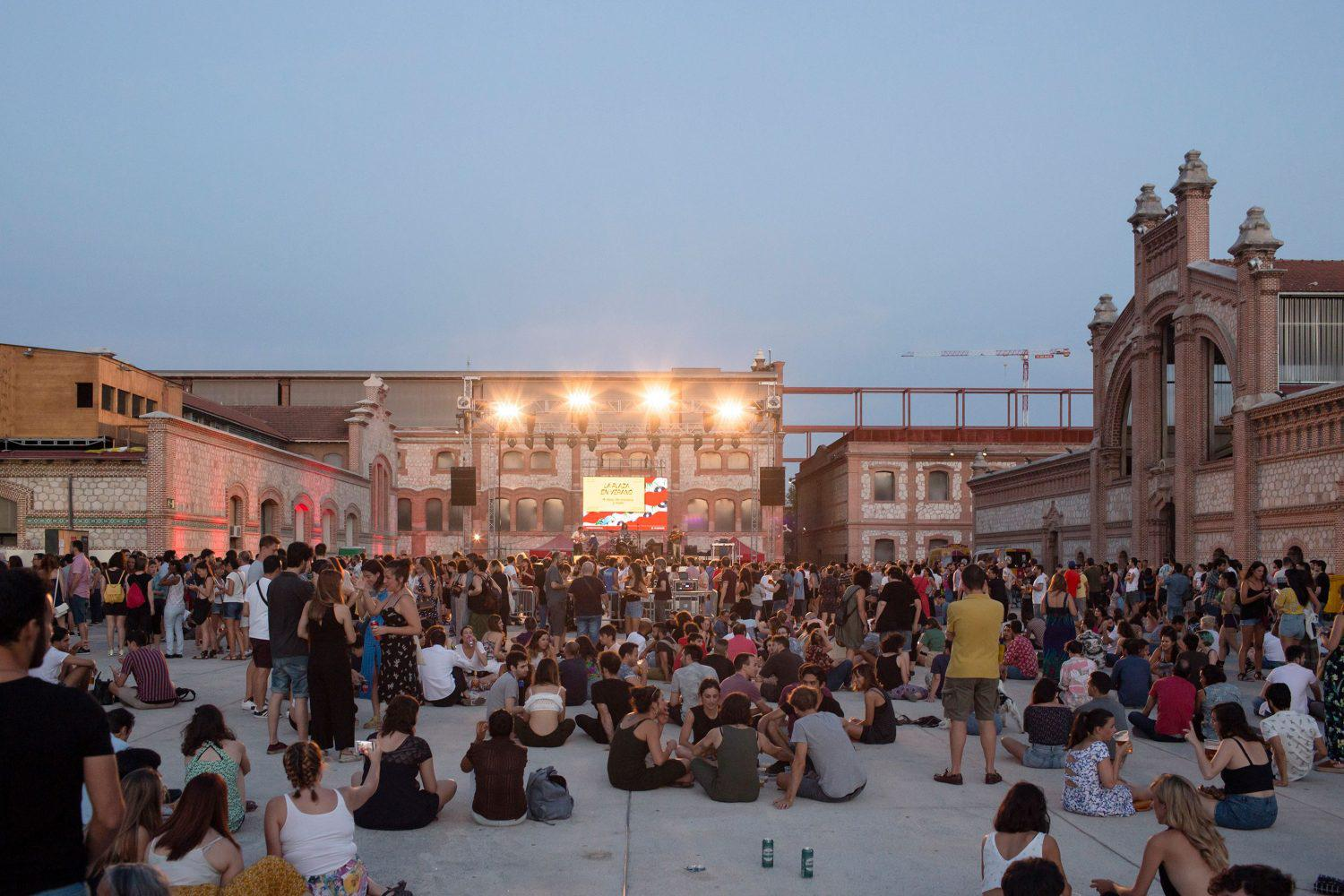
Summer concerts in Matadero

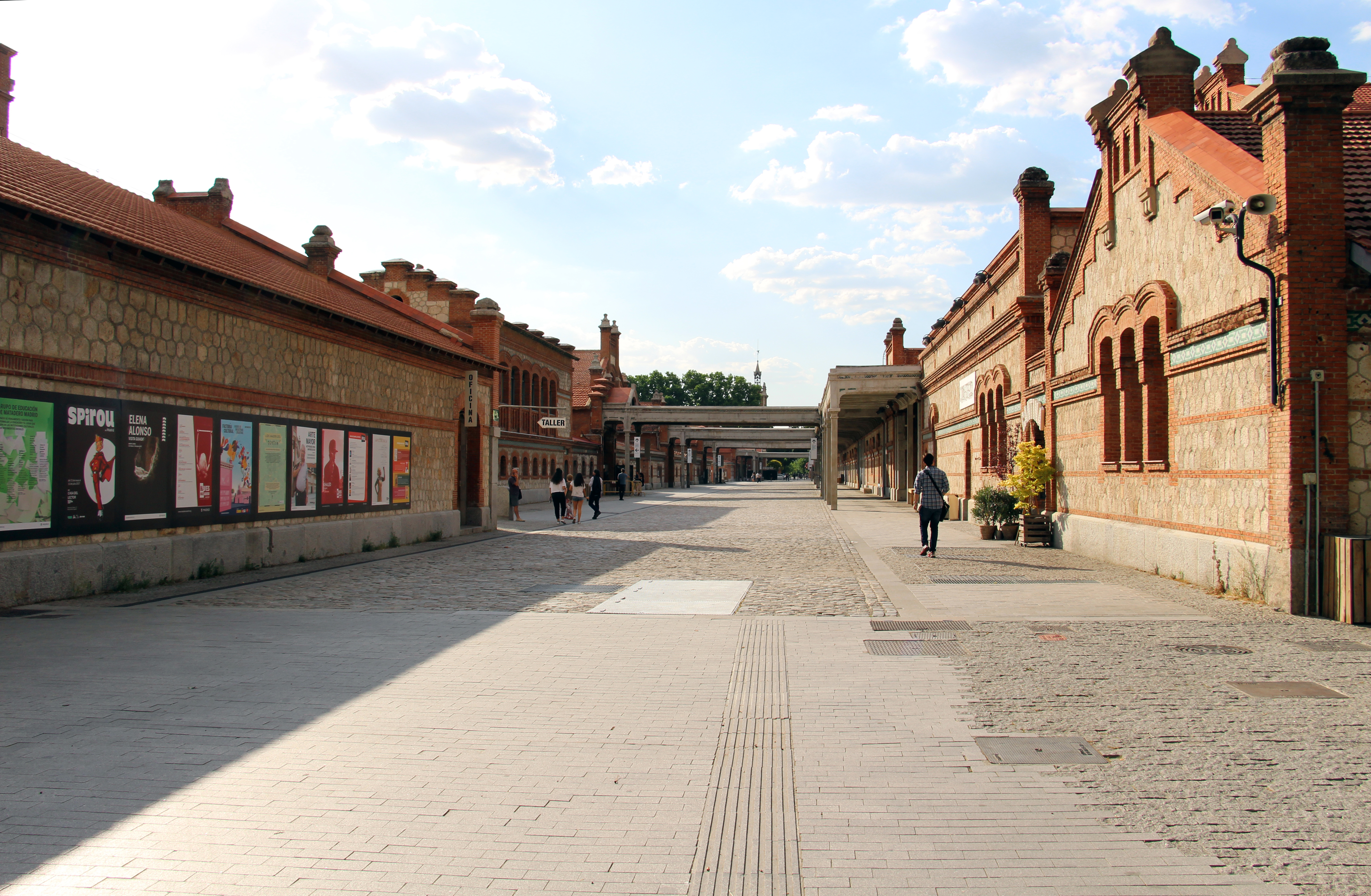
Street inside Matadero complex

At the turn of the 21st century, Madrid City Council decided to turn this space into an arts centre. The Matadero Madrid opened in 2006.

== Management ==
Matadero Madrid is a project promoted by Madrid City Council's Department of the Arts and managed by the Directorate General for Cultural Projects through Matadero Madrid's coordination team, in collaboration with other public and private organizations.

== Facilities ==
=== Abierto X Obras ===
The refurbished refrigeration room in the former slaughterhouse is a unique space for "site-specific" artistic work.

=== Archivo Matadero ===
Archivo Matadero is a space for consultation and research for accessing physical and online documentation in the four archives that compose it: Archivo de Creadores de Madrid, artea, FreshMadrid and Madrid Abierto. This is a point of access to a wide array of documents on the different disciplines in which each of the archives works: the visual arts, the performing arts, architecture and urban planning and public art.

=== El Taller ===
The facility is designed especially for meetings between artists and the public.

=== Extensión Avam ===
Through its satellite office, the Associated Visual Artists of Madrid (AVAM) will offer specialised services to professionals in the contemporary art sector, operating in a network with the AVAM Workshops in Pradolongo.

=== Calle y Plaza Matadero ===
Both individually and together, these spaces are used to accommodate large art events: dance, theatrical and circus performances, concerts and big art interventions in the open air. They are also the complex's main area for meeting and socialising.

=== Cineteca ===
The Cineteca will be dedicated to the documentary film genre. It is the permanent headquarters of the Documenta Madrid film festival

=== Depósito de Especies ===
The water tank of the old Legazpi slaughterhouse has been turned into a plant memorial and archive. A public garden that can be visited through the new access point at the Legazpi roundabout.

=== Avant Garden ===
The Avant Garden offers ecological and participatory activities.

=== Intermediæ ===
Intermediæ is a public, experimental programme. The programme works with the community in the following areas: ecology, art and activism; games as a form of exploration; visual culture; archival processes and memory; and the Creative Arts Grants programme.

=== Naves del Español ===
This staging centre is managed by Teatro Español. It is composed of three buildings joined with a main hall, which can be configured as needed and is unique in Madrid due to its formal characteristics and technical features; a theatre-café, which also functions as a foyer or lobby to the performance space; and Room 2, for small-format shows, next to spaces for rehearsal and training.

=== Central de Diseño ===
Central de Diseño is a space intended to promote graphic design, product design and space design.. The centre is promoted by the Association of Designers from Madrid (DIMAD) and is run by its own foundation (Fundación DIMAD).

=== Nave 16 ===
Nave 16 is an expository space covering more than four thousand square metres.

=== Nave de Música ===
The Nave de Música was a space occupied by the Red Bull Music Academy until November 2011 and now hosts the centre's entire musical programme. The space includes a radio studio and a recording studio, a small stage for concerts, nine rehearsal rooms and other facilities. Covering over 4,000 m^{2}, this space is an example of the new architecture that works with recycled and pre-existing elements, using limited resources.

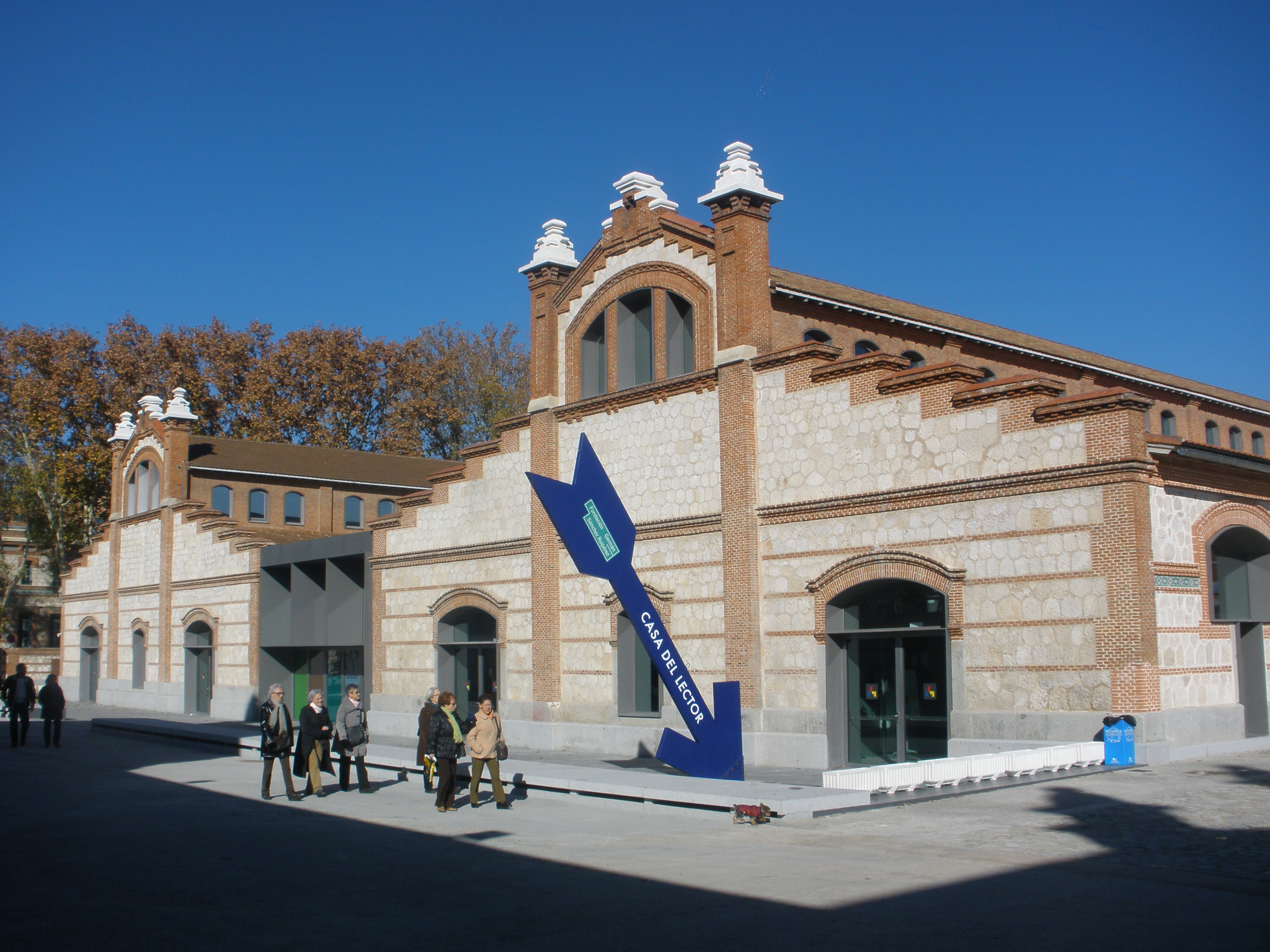
Casa del Lector

=== La Casa del Lector ===
This large cultural space is an initiative of the Germán Sánchez Ruipérez Foundation, which mainly focuses on readers and books. It is open to the general public and professionals.
