= San Fermín-Orcasur (Madrid Metro) =

Madrid Metro station

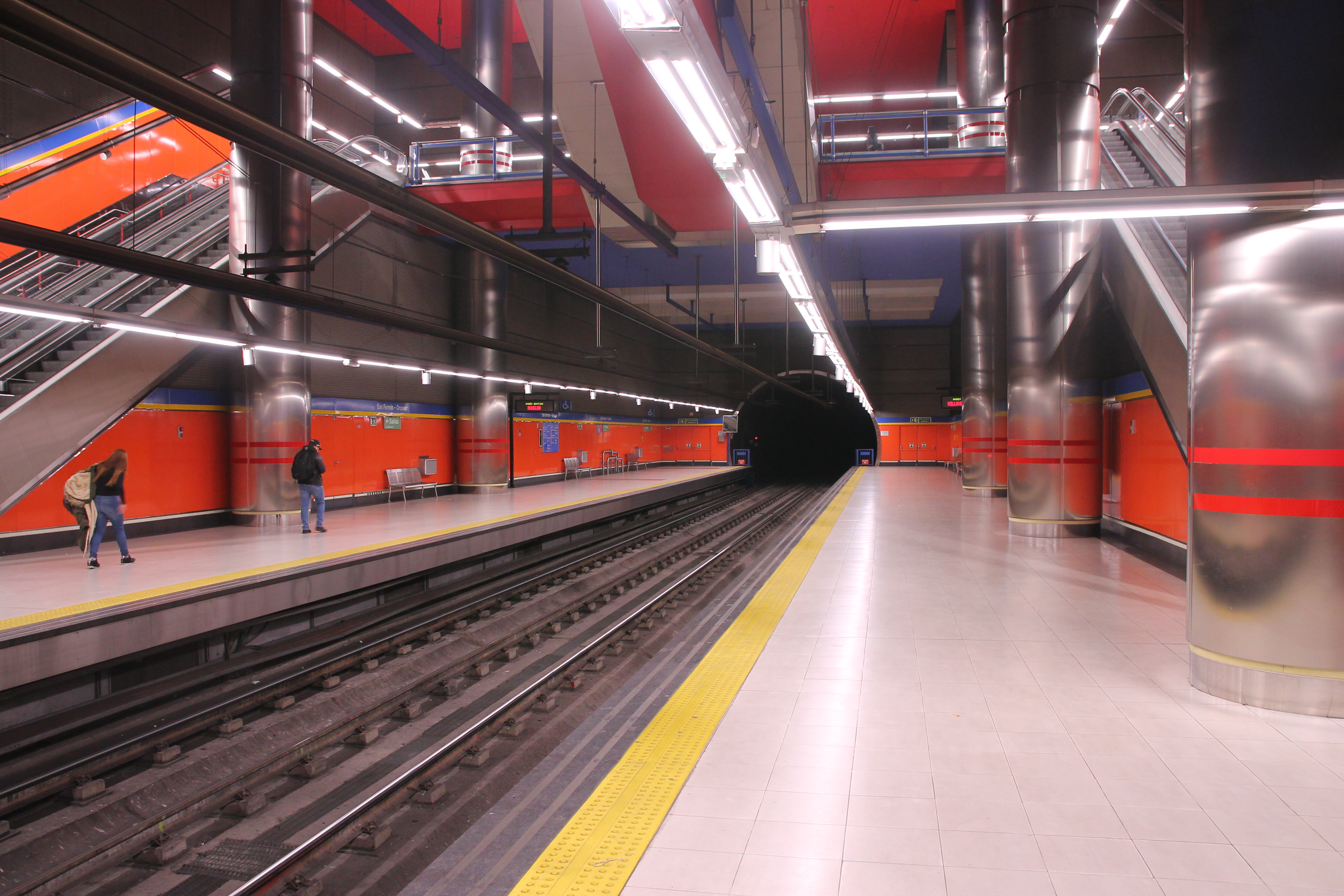

General information
- Location: Usera, Madrid; Spain
- Coordinates: 40.3699938°N 3.6941721°W
- System: Madrid Metro station
- Owner: CRTM
- Operator: CRTM

Construction
- Structure type: Underground
- Accessible: Yes

Other information
- Fare zone: A

History
- Opened: 21 April 2007; 19 years ago

Services
Preceding station	Madrid Metro	Following station
Ciudad de los Ángeles towards El Casar	Line 3	Hospital 12 de Octubre towards Moncloa
Location
- Location within Madrid

San Fermín-Orcasur [ˈsaɱ feɾˈmin oɾkaˈsuɾ] is a station on Line 3 of the Madrid Metro, serving the barrios of San Fermín and Orcasur. It is located in fare Zone A.
