= Almendrales (Madrid Metro) =

Madrid Metro station

- Platform of the station

General information
- Location: Usera, Madrid; Spain
- Coordinates: 40.3840978°N 3.6978863°W
- System: Madrid Metro station
- Owner: CRTM
- Operator: CRTM

Construction
- Structure type: Underground
- Accessible: Yes

Other information
- Fare zone: A

History
- Opened: 21 April 2007; 19 years ago

Services
Preceding station	Madrid Metro	Following station
Hospital 12 de Octubre towards El Casar	Line 3	Legazpi towards Moncloa
Location
- Location within Madrid

Almendrales [almenˈdɾales] is a station on Line 3 of the Madrid Metro, serving the Almendrales barrio. It is located in fare Zone A.
