= Hospital 12 de Octubre (Madrid Metro) =

Madrid Metro station

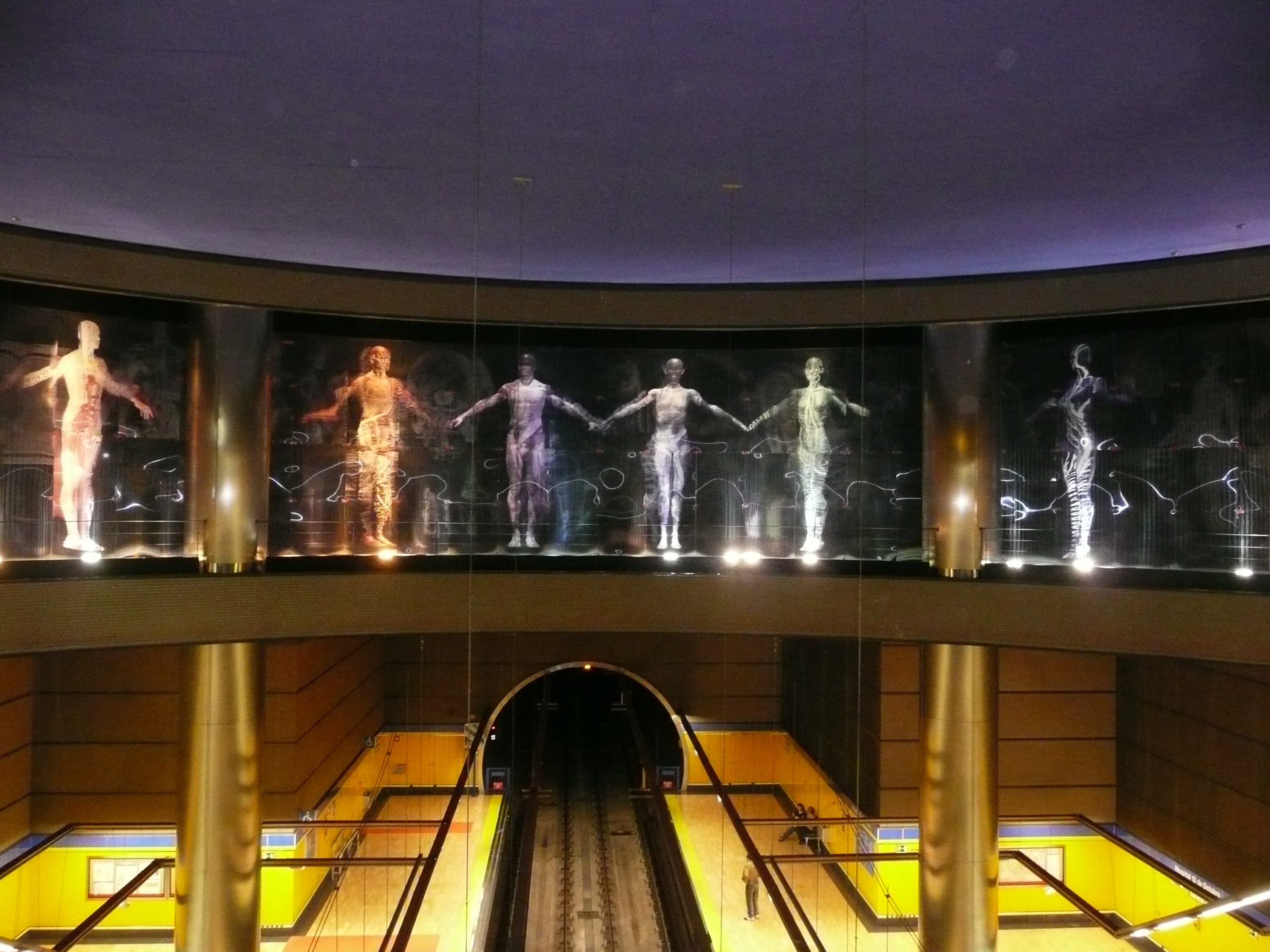

General information
- Location: Usera, Madrid; Spain
- Coordinates: 40.3750289°N 3.6958492°W
- System: Madrid Metro station
- Owner: CRTM
- Operator: CRTM

Construction
- Structure type: Underground
- Accessible: Yes

Other information
- Fare zone: A

History
- Opened: 21 April 2007; 19 years ago

Services
| Preceding station | Madrid Metro | Following station |
|---|---|---|
| San Fermín-Orcasur towards El Casar | Line 3 | Almendrales towards Moncloa |
Location
- Location within Madrid

Hospital 12 de Octubre [ospiˈtal ˈdoθe ðe oɣˈtuβɾe] is a station on Line 3 of the Madrid Metro, serving the Hospital Universitario 12 de Octubre. It is located in fare Zone A.
