= Usera =

Coordinates: 40°22′53″N 3°42′25″W

- District
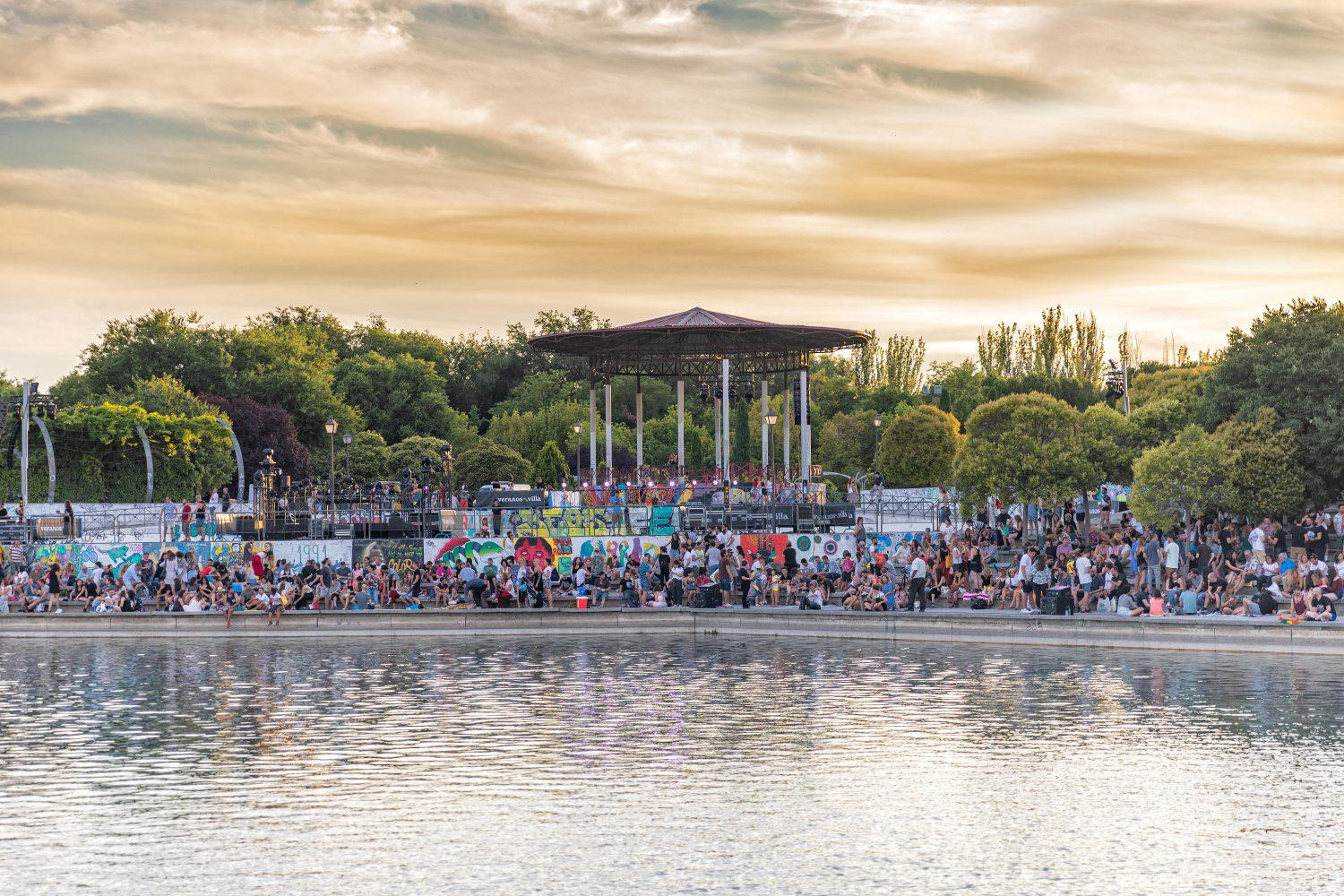
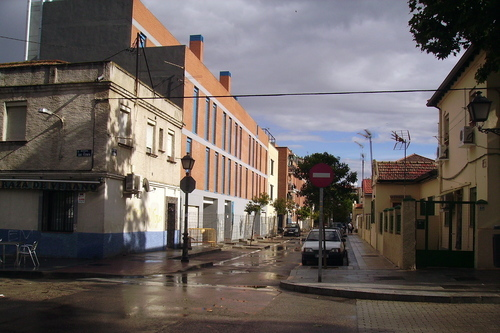
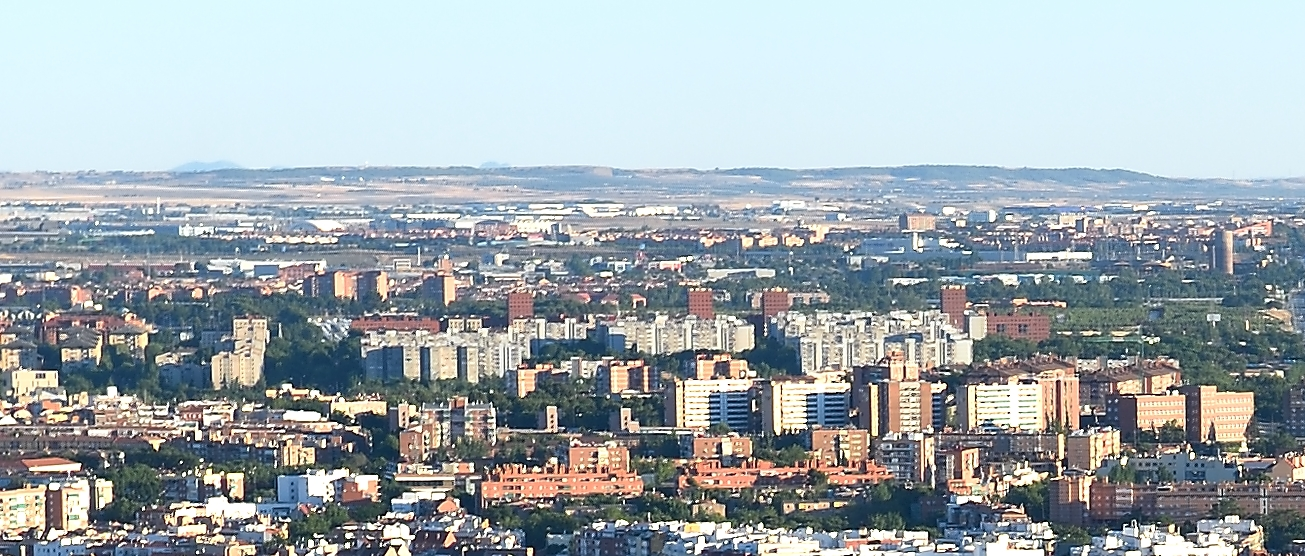
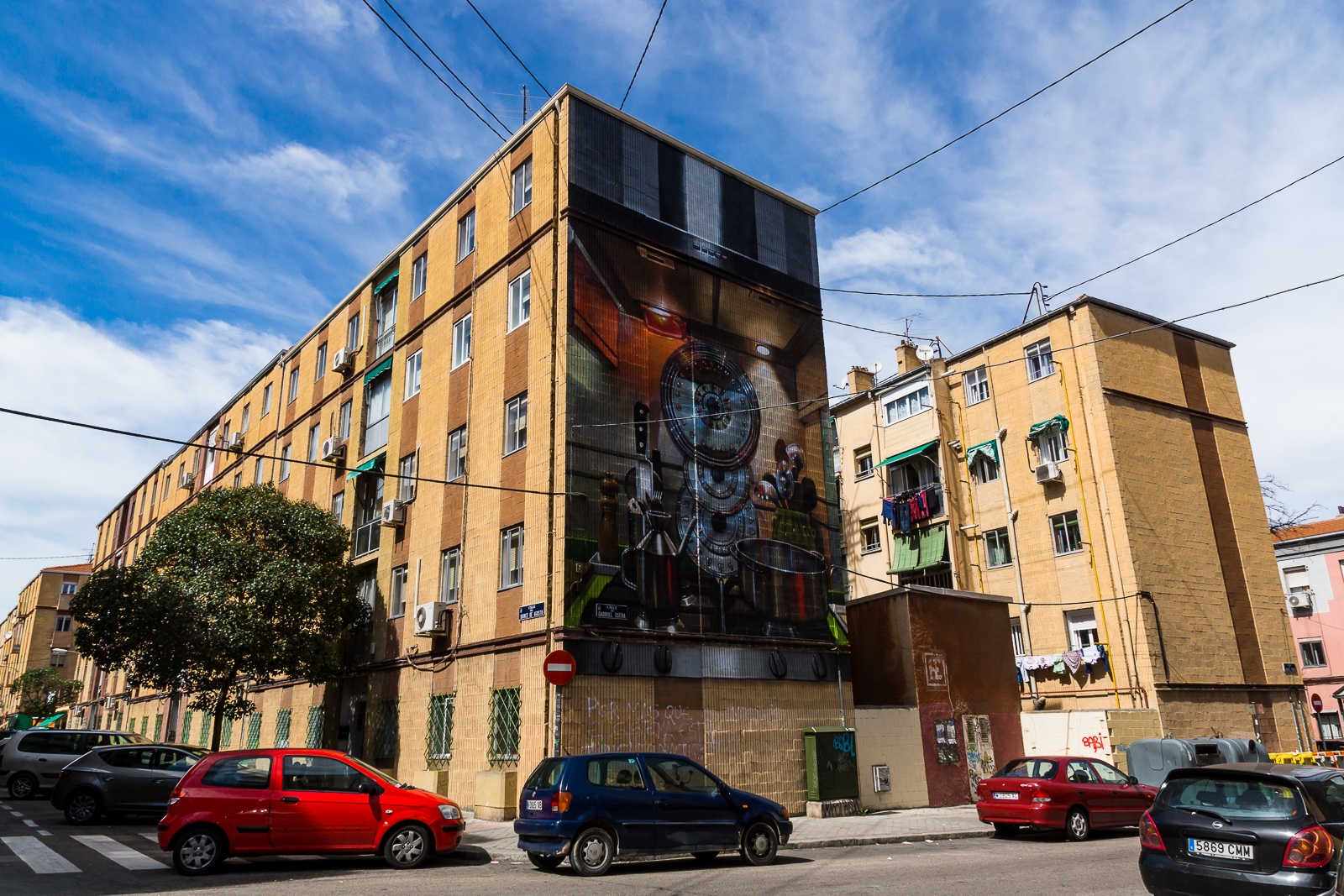
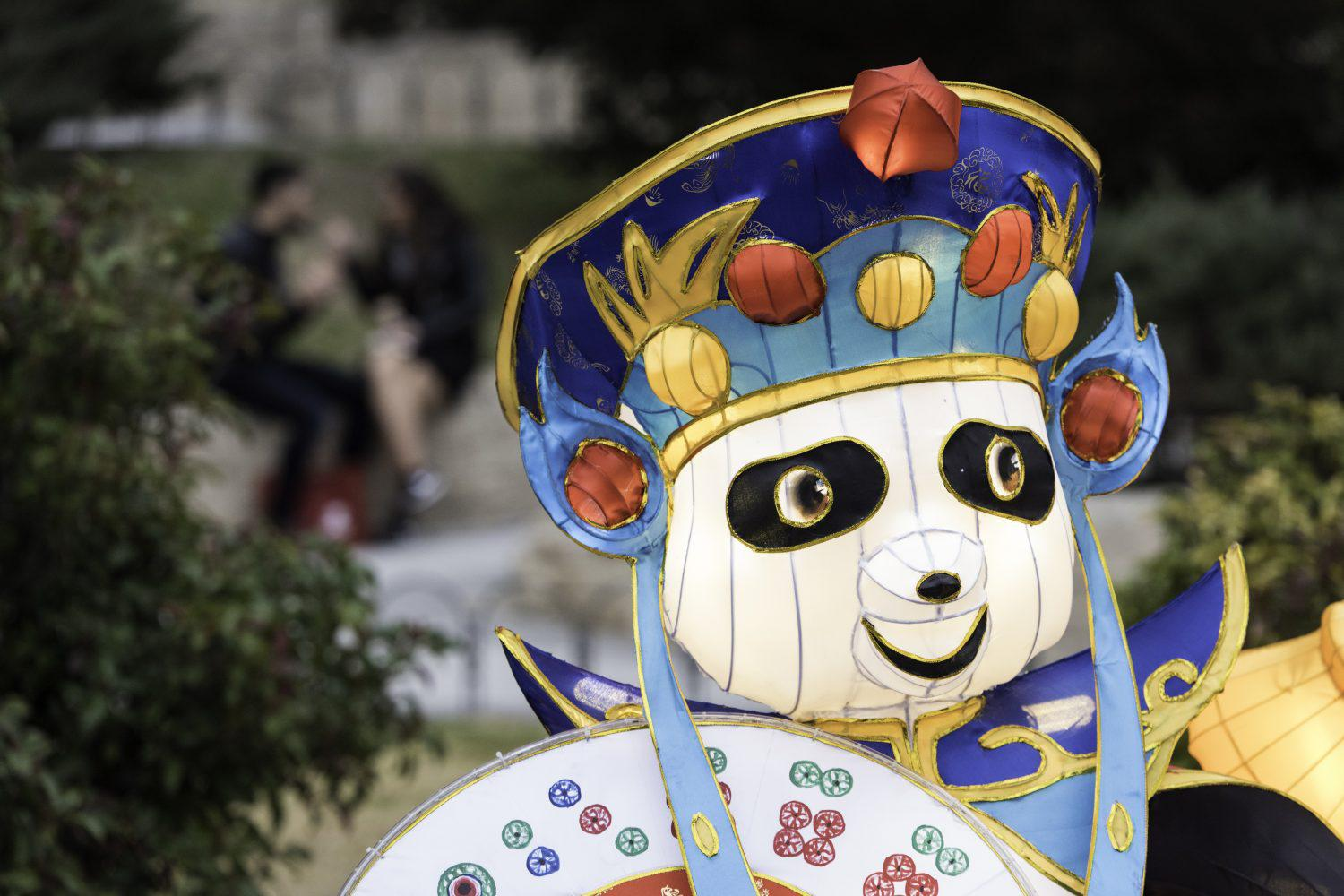
- Country: Spain
- Aut. community: Community of Madrid
- Municipality: Madrid

Government
  - Councillor-President: Sonia Cea Quintana (PP, 2023)

Area
  - Total: 7.70 km^{2} (2.97 sq mi)

Population
  - Total: 141,189
- Postal code: 28032

Usera [uˈse.ɾa] is a district of Madrid, Spain. It lies on the southern (right) bank of the Manzanares. It is home to about 10% of the Chinese citizens who live in the Madrid region, and has long-established Colombian community.

== History ==
The district was established during the city's restructuring on March 28, 1987. The district was formed from the northern part of the Villaverde district and the abolished Mediodia district.

The name of the district comes from the Usera neighborhood, located in the north of the district. This neighborhood has its origin in some land situated to the north of the municipality of Villaverde that belonged to "Tio Sordillo", a farmer from the city whose daughter married Colonel Marcelo Usera. The Colonel proposed that the development of this land would be more profitable than cultivation, so between 1925 and 1930 the land was divided into plots and sold.

The person in charge of delineating and layout of the streets was Colonel Marcelo's administrator, who decided to name many streets after members of the Usera family, as well as his service personnel and some neighbors. Examples of streets named this way are Isabelita, Amparo or Gabriel Usera streets.

In the late 1930s Usera gained notoriety because of the so-called Usera Tunnel scam, which cost the live of at least 67 people.

Usera began to grow from the 1960s onwards with immigrants mainly from rural areas in the rest of Spain, which developed a new network of commercial and service industries. From the 1980s onwards the district was negatively affected by drug addiction and insecurity.

However, since the 2000s, Usera has been revitalized by becoming Madrid's Chinatown. With the arrival of thousands of Chinese families the character of the neighborhood has changed completely and safety increased. Nearly 11,000 Chinese citizens currently live in Usera, reproducing its business models, traditions, gastronomy and festivals.

== Geography ==
=== Location ===
Usera is located to the south of the centre of Madrid. It is bounded to the east by the Manzanares River (between the Praga Bridge and the M-40), to the south by the M-40 motorway and to the west by the A-42 autovía. It is bordered by the district of Carabanchel to the west and northwest, Arganzuela to the north, Puente de Vallecas to the east and Villaverde to the south.

Subdivisions of Usera

=== Subdivision ===
The district is administratively divided into 7 wards (Barrios):

- Orcasitas (121)
- Orcasur (122)
- San Fermín (123)
- Almendrales (124)
- Moscardó (125)
- Zofío (126)
- Pradolongo (127)

== Education ==
In the Usera district, there are 18 child care centres (9 public and 9 private), 11 public nursery and primary schools, 5 secondary schools and 16 private schools (with and without state funding).

== Culture ==
=== Festivals ===
- Chinese New Year: The Chinese New Year is celebrated in February with parades and a Light Festival.
- The Usera festivities are held over a week towards the end of June. The Pradolongo Park is the main stage.

== Sport ==
Usera is home to the Caja Mágica (Magic Box), a multipurpose stadium used mainly for tennis competitions. The Caja Mágica hosts the annual Madrid Open, part of the ATP World Tour Masters 1000.

Usera is also the location of the Román Valero soccer stadium, belonging to the Colonia Moscardó Sports Club and the Unión Deportiva Usera soccer school, both located in Moscardó.

== Chinatown ==
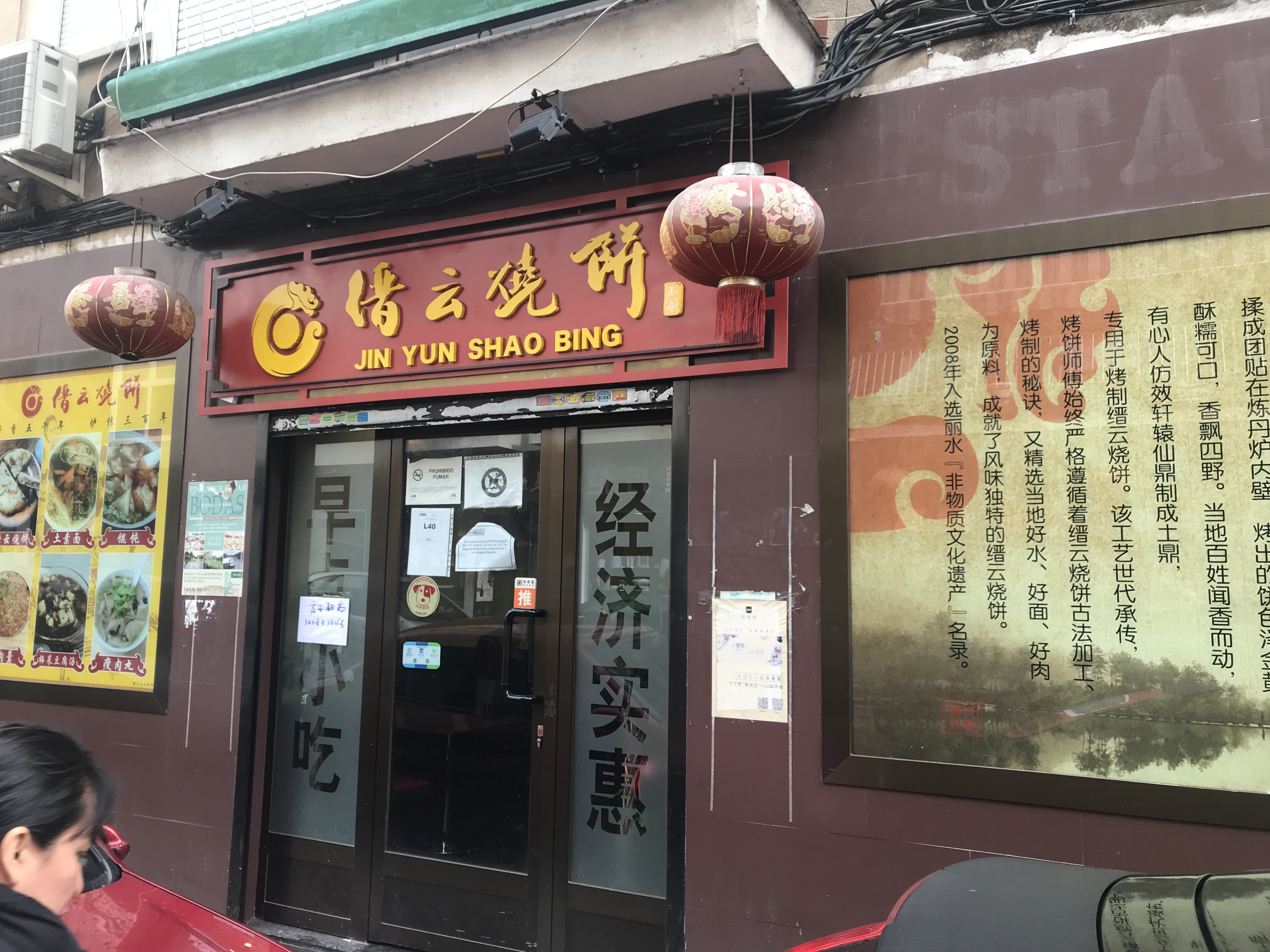
Chinese restaurant in Usera

Since the 2000s Usera has become the location of Madrid's Chinatown and is the neighbourhood with the largest concentration of the Chinese community in Spain. About 11,000 Chinese citizens reside in this district, approximately a quarter of the Chinese population of Madrid. The district is home to a large number of Chinese shops and restaurants and is the location of the annual Chinese New Year celebrations and parade.

== Transport ==
=== Trains ===
Within the district of Usera are two commuter train stations, Doce de Octubre and Orcasitas, both are part of the C-5 line of the Cercanías Madrid. The stations and line are operated by Renfe Operadora.

=== Metro ===
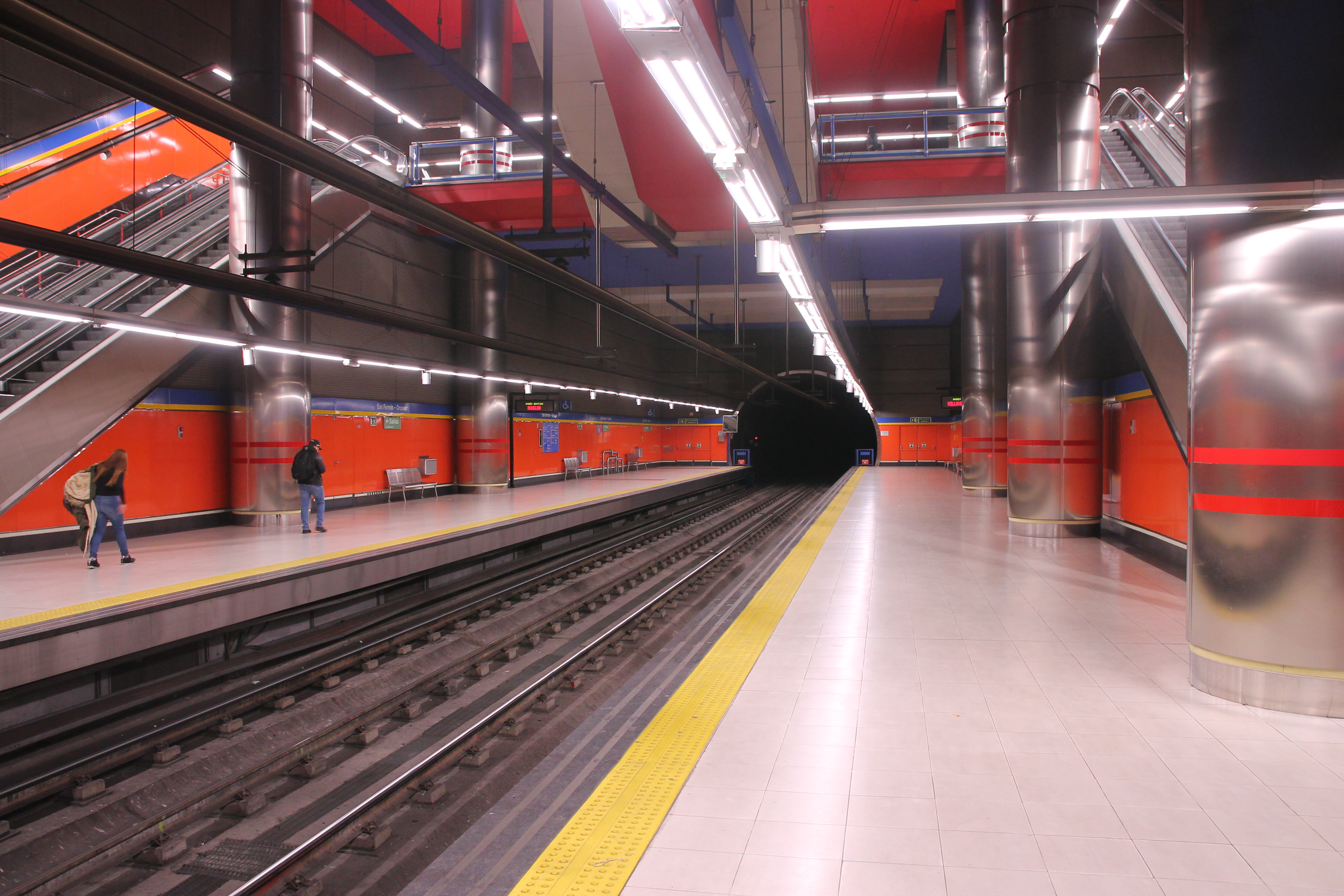
San Fermin-Orcasur metro station

Traditionally, the Usera district has been one of the districts with the least coverage by the Madrid Metro. Currently the district is served by three lines:

- Line 3 runs under Cordoba and Andalusia Avenues and has three stations in the district, Almendrales, Hospital Doce de Octubre and San Fermin-Orcasur.
- Line 6 serves the north of the district with the stations of Usera and Plaza Elíptica.
- Line 11 terminates at the Plaza Elíptica station.

=== Buses ===
The district is served by a number of bus routes including night routes and the express route E1. Buses are operated by EMT Madrid.
