= The Spanish Civil War (book) =

History book by Hugh Thomas

- Author: Hugh Thomas
- Language: English
- Subject: Spanish Civil War
- Published: 1961
- Media type: Print
- Pages: 1096 [4th, revised ed.]
- ISBN: 978-0-141-01161-5

The Spanish Civil War is a book by Hugh Thomas. It provides a scholarly historiographic account of the Spanish Civil War. Begun in 1957, it was first published in 1961 simultaneously in the United Kingdom by Eyre & Spottiswoode and in the United States by Harpers'. It won the Somerset Maugham Prize in 1962 and during the following few years was translated and published in Portugal, France, Germany, Denmark and Italy. Despite initial approving reviews, in Francoist Spain the book received unfavorable treatment and was never published.

The work was revised and enlarged in 1965, 1977 and 2001. It was re-issued many times, the last edition during the lifetime of the author in 2012 and the last known edition in 2022. Over the decades it remained the most popular monograph on the war and was translated into at least 13 languages, reportedly selling over a million copies around the globe. It continues to be quoted in scholarly works on the war. It is usually acclaimed for its unbiased perspective, high level of detail and lively narrative. Detractors claim that it emphasizes storytelling at the expense of historical analysis, that some interpretations advanced are doubtful, and that it relies too heavily on some sources while neglecting others.

== Background ==
=== Previous historiography ===
The first serious works on the Spanish civil war appeared when the conflict was still ongoing (Rudolf Rocker 1937, Frantisek Jellinek 1938). Numerous books went to print in Francoist Spain, but they were largely propagandistic; the best and the most detailed one was also plagued by censorship limitations (Joaquín Arrarás, 1940–1943). The analysis by Gerald Brennan covered causes rather than the war itself (1943). Beyond Spain there were personal accounts (e.g. Julió Álvarez del Vayo 1940), partisan narratives (e.g. Herbert Matthews 1958) or works which focused on particular dimensions of the war (e.g. Patricia van der Esch 1951, David Cattell 1954). In 1953 Brennan declined a proposal to write a broader work and suggested that Raymond Carr, who got interested in Spain only in the early 1950s, write it instead, a suggestion that would not bear fruit until much later. Herbert Southworth would not start writing his most famous work until 1963. Pierre Broué and Émile Témime were about to commence work on their book, to be published in 1961, but it reflected their Trotskyist leanings. Burnett Bolloten was merely collecting data, gathered in his later book (also 1961). Gabriel Jackson was a young college teacher and had not begun his account, which appeared in the mid-1960s.

=== Author ===
In the late 1950s Thomas was in his mid-20s. A Cambridge graduate, former employee of the Foreign Office and member of the British delegation to the UN Disarmament Commission, he was released at his own request due to unease with policies he was asked to promote. In 1956 he published a barely noticed novel on diplomatic life, The World Game. In 1957 he co-authored a Fabian Society brochure titled Disarmament – The Way Ahead. Disarmament remained "one of his main areas of interest". Together with Philip Noel-Baker he considered setting up a National Disarmament League. As director of the Disarmament Campaign of the United Nations he took part in various conferences as well as a meeting of the British-Soviet Friendship Society. He admitted left-wing sympathies, possibly bordering socialism. He was the Labour Party parliamentary candidate 1957-1958 for Ruislip and Northwood. At the time, he was a lecturer at the Royal Military College at Sandhurst. Some sources claim that in 1955 Thomas visited Spain for the first time and began his research on the civil war, though the introduction to his book mentions no such visit. At the time Thomas did not know any Spanish and, though a historian by education, had not published a single historiographic work. According to a contemporary, "in the late 1950s Thomas was casting around for the best use of his talents".

== In the making ==
=== Origins ===
James MacGibbon, a wartime Soviet spy (later a suspect under the MI5 surveillance, which was all unknown to Thomas) and literary agent of the Curtis Brown literary agency, approached the 25-year-old Thomas some time halfway through 1957. MacGibbon claimed having liked The World Game and its acid portrait of British diplomatic circles. He hinted to Thomas that an American firm Coward McCann wanted to commission a book about the Spanish civil war; he asked whether Thomas would be interested. Thomas confirmed and in August he provided an outline to Cass Canfield Jr., at the time the representative of Coward McCann. Canfield liked it and commissioned Thomas for Harper's, which he had by then joined. Thomas shared the outline also with his agent at Eyre and Spottiswoode (the British company which published The World Game), Douglas Jerrold, an active supporter of Franco 20 years before. By the autumn Thomas cashed in the $300 advance from Harper Brothers and £250 from Eyre and Spottiswoode, both considerable amounts (in 1957 average annual earnings in the UK were some £390, the Ford Anglia model cost £571). Further details are unknown; many years later, when approached by an Australian historian who was writing about impact of the Cold War on Anglo-American representations of Spanish civil war, Thomas denied him access to the correspondence between himself and his publisher.

=== Work in progress ===
Thomas was working on the book for almost 4 years, since the summer of 1957 until the spring of 1961. It is not clear whether he visited a single Spanish archive; in his introduction he did not mention any, though he was in Spain a number of times. He did research some documents of the Foreign Office, available at the time, the League of Nations papers in Geneva and numerous printed collections of American, German and Italian diplomatic sources. However, his key source was "a great library of books" written by the participants, "in every language imaginable". Thomas also spoke to tens of individuals from all sides of the conflict, involved in the war; the highest-ranking ones were former ministers in their respective wartime governments, Ramón Serrano Suñer on the Nationalist side and Federica Montseny, Manuel Irujo and Julio Alvarez del Vayo on the Republican one. Others included e.g. Pablo Azcárate, Alberto Onaindia, Josep Maria Tarradellas, José María Gil Robles, cardenal Ángel Herrera, Manuel Fal Conde and Don Juan de Borbón. His research carried him as far away as to Buenos Aires and Santiago de Chile. In later editions he listed 36 Spaniards and 49 people of other nationalities (mostly Britons) he interviewed. Thomas also engaged in epistolographic exchange with a number of individuals, including war correspondents like Herbert Matthews and Henry Buckley.

=== Publication ===
Thomas finished the draft in 1960. It was shown to Eyre and Spottiswoode men, Maurice Temple-Smith, John Bright-Holmes and James Wright. It is not clear whether they suggested any changes or corrections; Thomas does not mention anything in the like and later he refused access to his correspondence with the publisher. Vanessa Jebb, who in April 1962 would become Thomas's wife, compiled the index. He returned to Spain once more "for some last-minute topographical observations" before the work was deemed ready for publication; at the time he was already busy with the next project. First news on the forthcoming book appeared in Britain as marketing information in January 1961. The book was released in the United Kingdom by Eyre and Spottiswoode in April 1961 and in the United States by Harper & Brothers in June 1961. Initially the British edition on its cover was to feature the notorious photograph of Robert Capa, allegedly presenting a Republican militiaman in a moment when hit by enemy bullet, but eventually the publisher settled for simple text, with no graphics. In Britain the book cost 42 shillings (approximately the cost of a nylon shirt from Marks & Spencer). Both editions were hard-cover only. The first British edition was scaled rather moderately as 5,000 copies; they sold out very quickly during few months. None of the sources consulted provides information on the number of copies of the US release.

=== Structure ===
The first 1961 edition (both in the United Kingdom and the United States) was 720 pages in total, but throughout all subsequent revisions across the decades it kept growing in size. The main historiographic narrative falls into 4 parts, named "books"; each of them is divided into numbered and untitled (except #1, titled Prologue, and #49, titled The Flight from Catalonia) chapters. Book 1 (The Origins of the War, pp. 1–186, 186 pages in total, chapters 1–12) presents the background and politics of the Second Republic, Book 2 (Rising and Revolution, pp. 187–450, 263 pages in total, chapters 13–27) deals with the period from July till October 1936, Book 3 (World War in Miniature, pp. 451–654, 203 pages in total, chapters 28–37) covers the months from November 1936 till April 1937) and Book 4 (The War of two Counter-Revolutions, pp. 655–890, 235 pages in total, chapters 38–50) is focused on the phase from May 1937 till April 1939. A brief Conclusion (pp. 891–930, 39 pages, chapter 51) follows. The last release (2012) contains also introduction to the 50th anniversary edition, table of contents, Author’s Notes (one-page explanation as to naming conventions adopted), list of technical abbreviations, list of political abbreviations, preface to the 2001 edition, 4 appendices, bibliographical note, select bibliography and index (footnotes are placed at the bottom of each page). The last edition (Penguin) contains 35 maps, but there is not a single picture (except the cover photograph of a Republican militiaman).

== Immediate reception ==
=== Left ===
Moderate circles tended to positive. Michael Foot (Tribune) called it "a prodigy of a book". Malcolm Muggeridge appreciated that the author skilfully tackled "disagreeable matter". David Marquand (Guardian) delivered an ambiguous praise of "a masterpiece of old-fashioned history"; he noted "personalities which crowd his canvas spring to life … but social and economic history is rarely more than a background; and we get comparatively little sense of the blind, spasmodic heaving of a society in agony". Daily Herald noted that "Mr. Hugh Thomas knows Spain and the Spaniards. Though supporter of the Republic, he writes as a scholar, with strict regard for facts". However, among radical Left the book was heavily criticised. Vernon Richards described the book as "the most cynical book on the Civil War that I have read", claiming that fascinated with personalities, Thomas "more or less overlooks the chief actors – the revolutionary workers – in a struggle that held the world’s attention for nearly three years"; he declared also that the author "lacks the human sympathy without which it is impossible even to start understanding the Spanish people". Similarly, William Alexander (Daily Worker) destroyed the work altogether. Jay Allen was irritated by Thomas, "terribly fuzzy about a lot of things", while Southworth dismissed him as the ethically dubious one who "does not want to take sides", a writer but not a historian. IB veterans were outraged by suggestion that "the war was more than a simple contest between democracy and Fascism".

=== Right ===
On the Right opinions ranged from cautious approval to moderate criticism. Cyril Connolly (Sunday Times) concluded that "almost no aspect of the Civil War, however painful or unpopular, escapes him in this splendid book". The former Nationalist combatant Peter Kemp, who referred to Thomas as "young writer of the Left", paid tribute to "a truly prodigious labour of research" as "clear, readable and carefully documented narrative"; he credited the author for his efforts "to control his own sympathy for the Republic", but concluded that the author was "not quite able to conceal his prejudice against the Nationalists and, in particular, General Franco". Similarly, Arnold Lunn, who wrote to the conservative Catholic Herald, saw the narrative as somewhat biased in favour of the Republicans and underlined reported prejudices of the author against Franco, yet he still thought the work highly readable and interesting. The Sphere acknowledged the book as notable historiographic achievement, especially that "Hugh Thomas admits his sympathies are with the Republicans but this does not prevent him from being scrupulously fair to the Rebels". The Illustrated London News published a large, one-page review by Charles Petrie, who during the war co-led a pro-Nationalist propaganda campaign in Britain; though somewhat cautious and with reservations, the article nevertheless recommended the book as a sound piece of historiography. Roy Jenkins praised it in The Spectator. Popular local media published assenting notes, like "it is a book hard to lay aside".

=== Academia ===
First reviews by professional historians differed. John Lynch praised it as a work which breaks through "the smokescreen put up by journalists and propagandists". Raymond Carr commended the work as a "balanced account" but had reservations about what he saw as Thomas's liking for amusing anecdotes, which diminished the overall picture, and added that "my quarrel with Mr Thomas is one of proportion and detail". Norman Padelford claimed that "the volume gives the fullest and quite the most insightful account of what transpired within Republican circles" but "is somewhat less definitive on the Nationalist side". Stanley G. Payne praised level of detail and "emotional disengagement", but complained about insufficient archival research, "rather poor organisation", "clumsy style and confusing syntax". Hugh Trevor-Rooper wrote to Bolloten that "it is maddening to me that your book dropped unnoticed from the English press while the vastly inferior work of Hugh Thomas was accepted by the reviewers". Angel Palerm noticed "indifference and lack of comprehension, not objectivity and impartiality", that the book "enables the outsider to view the war in Spain … as the bullfights or the flagellant processions" and is "another link in the chain of ‘black’ literature about Spain". Robert Garland Colodny delivered a demolishing review; he failed to notice a "deeper insight" and concluded that Thomas "parades his erudition that is rendered lifeless by the dust of archives and the moral emasculation that masquerades as scholarly detachment and objectivity", suspecting that "Thomas’s failure is traceable to the astigmatic miasma of the Cold War". In 1962 the book earned the Somerset Maugham Award.

=== Spain ===
In 1960, shortly before the publication, Thomas enjoyed brief attention of Spanish press; many titles referred his letter to The New Statesman, where he withdrew earlier reservations (expressed in 1958 review of the work by Herbert Matthews) as to authenticity of Moscardó’s phone talk with his son during the siege of Alcazár. It was noted that though Thomas was "bien conocido por su inclinación izquierdista", he behaved like a gentleman and even offered his apologies to Moscardó's widow. Following the book release initial reviews were rather positive; they highlighted paragraphs thought to be in line with the Francoist historiographic narrative. In 1961 the semi-official Hoja Oficial de Lunes noted "libro veraz y objetivo", in which "el historiador inglés Hugh Thomas desentraña el verdadero signo de la Cruzada". However, a detailed confidential 1962 analysis which reached Franco was largely critical. The public tone started to change; though in 1963 some authors claimed that even Thomas, "poco sospechoso también de favorable a los nacionales", reportedly confirmed some threads of the official Francoist perspective, the same year he was also stigmatized elsewhere as "el arrogante y juvenil Hugh Thomas". In a largely critical 1964 review he was counted among authors who "parecen incapaces de librarse de los prejudicios que la rodean". In the mid-1960s he might have been referred to as "el procomunista Hugh Thomas". In 1966 the semi-official Boletín de Orientación Bibliográfica dismissed the work, the key charge having been "aceptación ciega de las fuentes". The exile Anarchist press lambasted the work from the onset as written with "malas intenciones y tendencia a la falsedad". Some exile pundits, though with minor reservations, admitted "irreproachable impartiality".

== Changes ==
=== Translations and revisions ===
In the UK the first print-run was shortly followed by additional one; altogether in Britain the first edition sold in 16,000 copies. In the US the book for a few weeks appeared on the bestseller list, compiled by Time. The work immediately attracted attention of publishing houses abroad. The first translation – anonymous and later criticized for manipulating the original - was into Spanish by the Paris-based émigré publishing house Ruedo Ibérico, released already in 1961 (La guerra civil española). Other translations soon followed: in 1961 into Portuguese (A guerra civil de Espanha) and French (La guerre d'Espagne), in 1962 into German (Der spanische Bürgerkrieg) and Danish (Den spanske borgerkrig) and in 1963 into Italian (Storia della guerra civile spagnola). The second edition, re-worked by Thomas, was published by Penguin Books in 1965, to be re-issued by Pelican Books in 1968. In 1970 the book was translated into Greek (Ιστορία Του Ισπανικού Εμφυλίου Πολέμου). By that time the work has already been re-issued by foreign publishers, e.g. in West Germany in 1964 or in France in 1967. The book was first published in Spain in 1976 in a new, non-partisan translation. The third English-language edition (following another revision) was released in 1977, reprinted with a new preface in 1986 and then in 1990. The fourth edition appeared on the market in 2001, to be renewed in 2003 and (as anniversary edition) in 2012. By this time the book has been translated into Swedish (Spanska inbördeskriget), Dutch (De spaanse burgerloog), Russian (Гражданская война в Испании), Japanese (スペイン市民戦争), Chinese (西班牙内战：秩序崩溃与激荡的世界格局，1936-1939) and Hebrew (מלחמת האזרחים בספרד). Thomas claimed the book "had seventeen foreign publishers" and declared (incorrectly) that it "was printed in every language of the European Union".

=== Editorial ===
The last edition of The Spanish Civil War, published during the lifetime of the author, took place in 2012. Since its original release 51 years earlier the structure of the work remained mostly unchanged. Some minor additional sections have been appended in-between (e.g. a preface to the 2001 edition, and then on top of it an additional preface written in 2012 for the 50th anniversary edition), while some sections have disappeared (e.g. the first edition contained a brief part titled Some leading actors in the Spanish civil war, which has been dropped later). Some editions contained appendices, not published in other cases (e.g. the US version of 1986 included one appendix dedicated to Spanish economy, another one focused on the International Brigades, and one more with figures on the Catalan industry production). Few maps placed in the first editions have been later left out and some maps have undergone minor re-edition. Brief summary of each chapter, originally placed at its beginning (and included in the table of contents), was then eliminated. Assortments of photographs included in the book differed depending upon release and publisher (the last edition contains no photographs at all). In some cases the work was published in two or more physical volumes. Minor editorial changes followed, e.g. cases of italics, like bourgeoisie, were converted to regular font. Covers of specific editions varied enormously, ranging from simple text with no graphics at all to reproduction of wartime posters, photographs or collages. Bibliography kept growing, as new titles published were being acknowledged in subsequent editions.

=== Narrative ===
Since the 1961 debut of the book Thomas revised it thoroughly 3 times, plus minor changes preceding some editions. Revisions were largely about elaborating on specific episodes in more detail; the book grew from 720 pages in 1961 to 1096 pages in 2012 and in later editions there were tens of new footnotes added, pointing to works published in the 1970s or the 1980s. Some alterations were vital. The death toll of the war, initially estimated at some 0.61m, in the mid-1970s was reduced to 0.37m. Proportions of executions carried by respectively the Nationalists and the Republicans changed from early 40:60 to later 58:42. Other changes referred to key episodes, e.g. initially Thomas claimed that Mola first set the day of the coup on 15 July, the claim he dropped later. Some commentators noticed major shifts in interpretation. In not few cases division into chapters changed, e.g. originally the events from late June 1936 till the coup were referred in chapters 13 and 14, while later they were consolidated within one chapter. Some paragraphs were shifted across the narrative, e.g. originally the death of Lorca was referred in chapter 19, but later it was moved to chapter 16. Numerous other, less important changes have been introduced. Some other figures have been re-assessed, e.g. casualties of the Battle of Jarama were reduced by almost two-thirds. In some cases (Guernica) numbers were revised first downwards and then again, but upwards. Opinion on few key figures changed. Account of certain details was re-formulated. Some errors were corrected. Thomas’ assessment of some sources changed (e.g. the case of Krivitsky); this refers to some episodes as well (Moscardó's phone talk with his son). Initial wrong personal claims have been later dropped with apologies offered (e.g. in case of Gustavo Durán and the Usera Tunnel scam). Some quotations have been re-sourced, e.g. the one from Durruti.

== Later fate ==
=== In Spain ===
The book has never been published in Francoist Spain and numerous sources claim that it "has been banned". Single copies were being brought from France. One such case, dated 1967, ended up with detention of a Spaniard in question; as the book was among numerous bulletins and leaflets carried, the man was charged with "illegal propaganda" and "spreading communism". From time to time Thomas was subject to press criticism, with irony prevailing over assault. According to some sources Sección de Estudios sobre la Guerra de España, a section within the Ministry of Information, was set up to counter the narrative offered not only by Southworth, but also by Thomas. Rafael Casas tackled his mistakes in a dedicated article. However, Thomas kept visiting Spain; in 1969 one title noted the paradox that while he remained "historiador prohibido", Thomas was giving public lectures in various Spanish cities. In the early 1970s he was being interviewed by official press, also offering his comments on the book. In 1974 Ramón Salas Larrazábal commented favourably that when preparing his work, Hugh Thomas intended to "escribir la primera [historia] con intención de imparcialidad, aunque no saliera perfecta". After the fall of Francoism The Spanish Civil War was immediately translated and re-issued a number of times; until works of Spanish scholars appeared on the market in the 1980s, Thomas emerged as the primary point of reference. Since beginning of the bitter memory war in the 1990s he escaped major criticism, be it from the Left or from the Right. His passing away was acknowledged as loss of a great Hispanist both by the socialist El País and the right-wing El Confidencial, though in some cases this was due to his criticism of the Black Legend rather than to his work on the civil war.

=== Current standing ===
Though the book was written in the late 1950s, in the 21st century it is not relegated to the "old stuff" category, a distant and outdated remnant of where historiography was 60 years ago. Because Thomas kept revising it until the 2010s, it is considered a monograph fully recommendable for a present-day reader. In academic historiographic works on the Spanish civil war, published recently, it is a must-have item in accompanying bibliographical listings or bibliographical essays. Numerous scholars refer it as "critically acclaimed", "seminal work" or "una de las referencias más importantes". One author declared it "verdadero exponente del empirismo clásico definitorio de la historiografía británica". According to some history professionals, until today it is "the best general work in English on the Spanish Civil War" and it "stands without rivals as the most balanced and comprehensive book on the subject". Some scholars declare that the book was "the greatest single influence on my writing and, indeed, my general approach as a historian". Marketing campaigns keep advertising the work as "the best, most engrossing narrative" of the war or "definitive one-volume history of a conflict". Also in popular discourse the book is viewed as "obra maestra", "one of key works on the conflict" and "el clásico", acknowledged in such terms both by the right-wing ABC and the socialist El País. Perhaps the most frequently repeated praise is related to non-biased attitude. The book reportedly sold "nearly a million copies throughout the world" and is being constantly re-published; in 2022 Spanish newspapers decided to issue a pocket book reprint.

=== Criticism ===
In present-day public discourse critical remarks about Thomas's work are fairly rare if not exceptional. Some authors repeat reservations raised already in the 1960s, namely that the book was more about storytelling than about historiographic analysis. Paul Preston, in popular statements usually highly apologetic towards his academic master, in opinions intended for specialist audience adheres to the cautious tone when noting ambiguously a "highly colourful narrative account" and summarising that the book "did an enormous amount to popularize the subject but it constitutes a readable compendium of information about the war rather than a major historiographical landmark". Thomas's effort to maintain "liberal objective stance" might be taken against him, with remarks about "merely attempting to find an equilibrium", which reportedly led to initial "dominance of narrative over analysis", merely "corrected somewhat" in subsequent editions. In terms of specific interpretations offered, Payne remains highly sceptical about Thomas's vision of "the War of the Two Counter Revolutions" against his own perspective of the war as principally the conflict between revolution and counter-revolution. One scholar opined that "equally dated are the repeated clichés about the Spanish character, and, indeed, Thomas’s readiness to stereotype all national groupings that participated in the civil war" and – repeating some earlier scholarly doubts and despite numerous revisions of the book – pointed to insufficient source criticism, which render some paragraphs dubious. Numerous specific episodes are tackled as incorrectly accounted, e.g. in case of International Brigades or the Anarchists. Few glaring mistakes survived all revisions and keep being repeated also in the very recent editions.

== Impact ==
For Thomas personally the book was a turning point. Before he was a young disarmament activist unknown to wider public, former civil servant with no permanent job, and the author of two failed novels, who kept hovering around left-wing circles. The publication catapulted the barely 30-year-old author to the status of authority on the Spanish civil war, earned him name in Britain, the United States and Europe, and set him up financially. It also determined his future lifetime career as principally this of a historian, author and scholar. In few years he turned from a person who did not even know Spanish into a Hispanist, later to become a great Hispanist. Many years afterward Thomas admitted that the reviews the book got on its release were a determining factor in his own life and career. For historiography on the Spanish Civil War the book formed a turning point as well. Though the year of 1961 marked the appearance of 3 major works (Thomas, Bolloten, Broué/Témime), it was the work of Thomas which enjoyed major impact. According to a scholar who in 2011 summarized 70 years of historiographic output on the war, the year of 1961 was "punto de arranque", which ended domination of "mythical grand-narratives produced by both contending parties" (i.e. this of a "crusade" and this of "fighting fascism") and commenced a new wave of scientifically mature works (later in the 1960s also Southworth, Jackson, Carr, Tuñón de Lara, Payne, Malefakis). Another professional Hispanist claims that in this very field the book formed part of "the academic breakthrough" of the 1960s. Probably for some half a century the book was the most popular monograph on the war; its preeminence came under threat as late as in 2006, with release of the popular work fathered by Antony Beevor, "whose sweeping narrative now challenges Thomas".

== See also ==
- Hugh Thomas
- Spanish Civil War
