= Fermín =

Fermín or Fermin may refer to:

- Fermin, Spanish saint
- Fermín (name), Spanish name and surname

== See also ==
- San Fermín (disambiguation)
