= Pradolongo =

Coordinates: 40°22′42″N 3°42′22″W

- City neighborhood
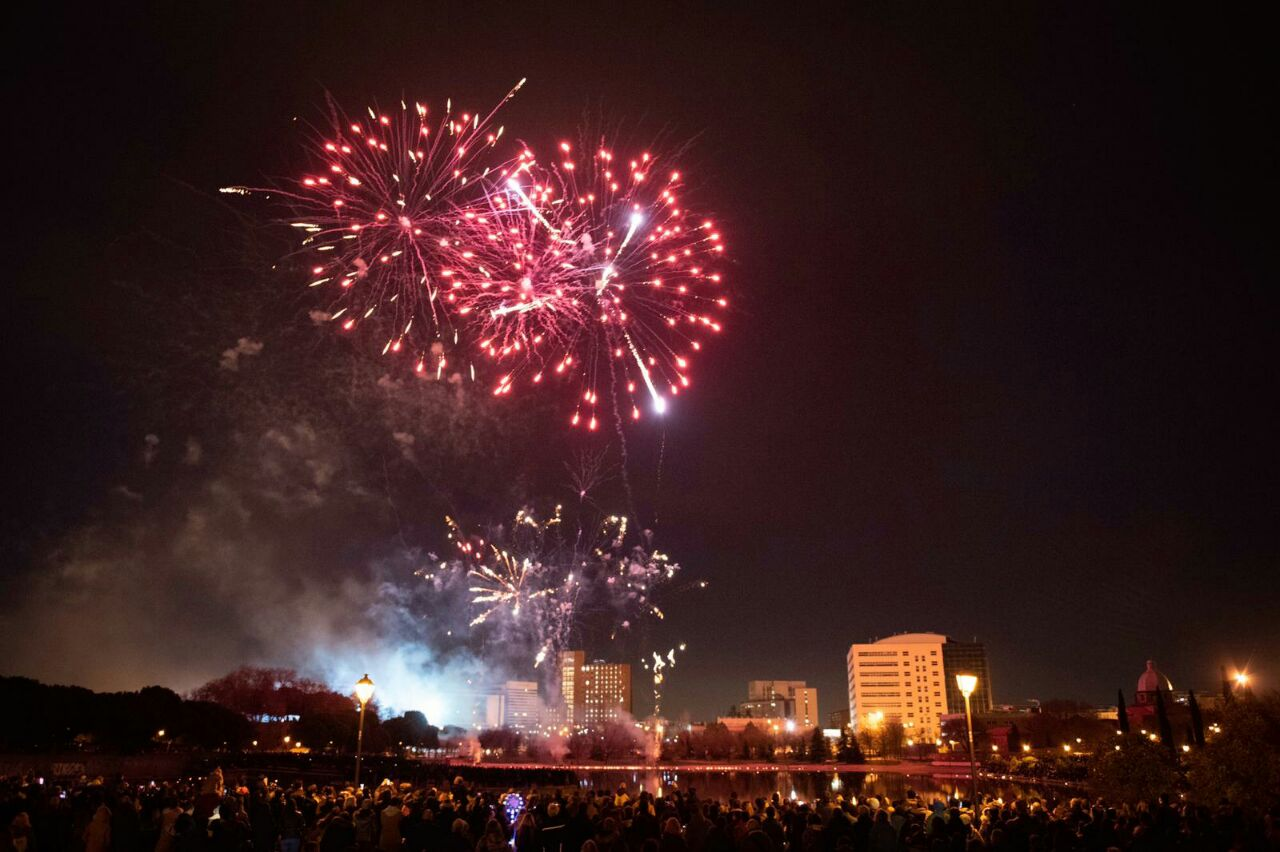

- Country: Spain
- Aut. community: Community of Madrid
- Municipality: Madrid
- District: Usera

Pradolongo is a administrative neighborhood (barrio) of Madrid belonging to the district of Usera.
