= Hospital Universitario 12 de Octubre =

Coordinates: 40.37592°N 3.69899°W

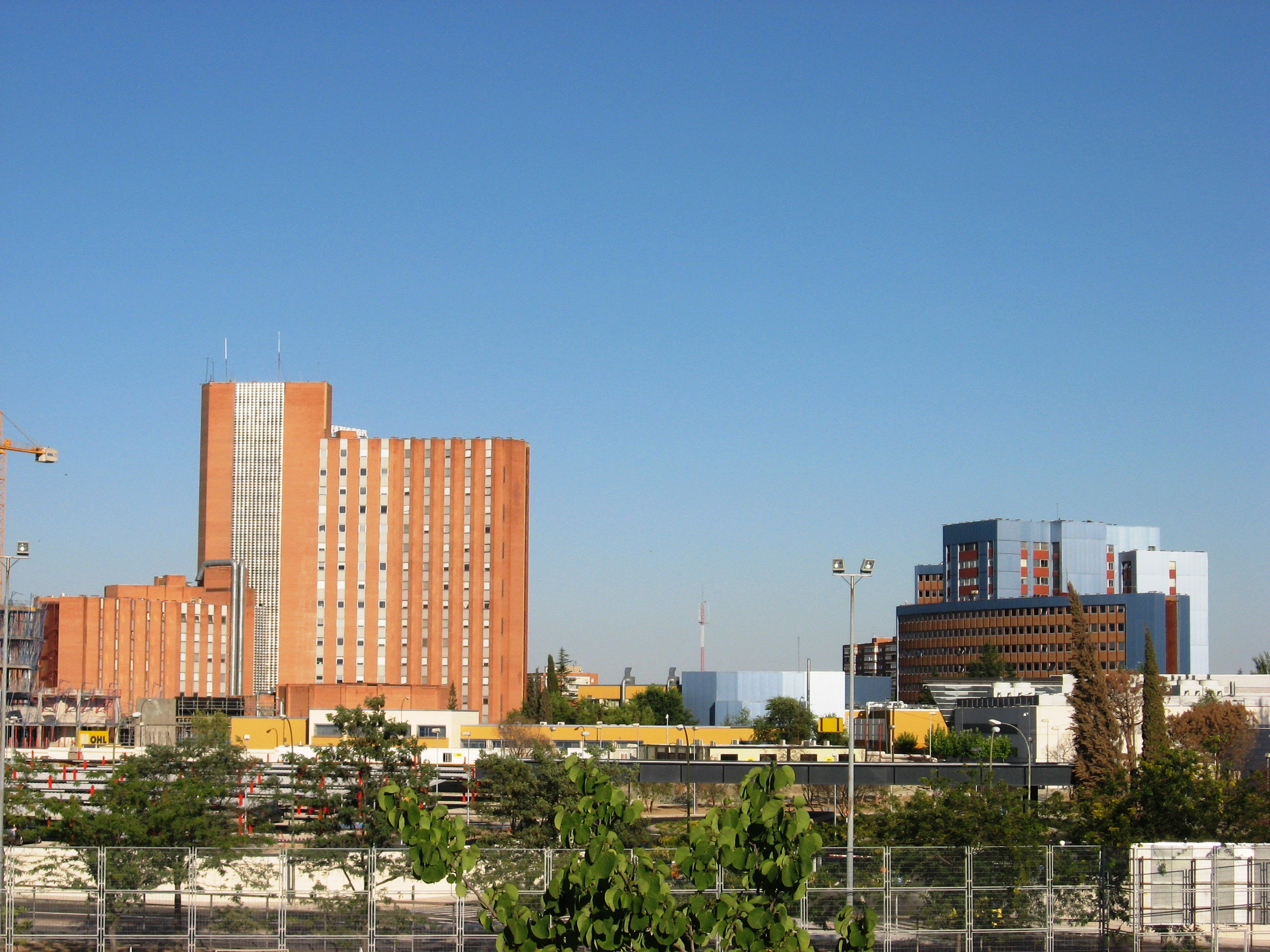

Geography
- Location: Avenida de Córdoba 41, 28026, Madrid, Community of Madrid, Spain

Organisation
- Care system: Public
- Type: Teaching, District General
- Affiliated university: Complutense University of Madrid
- Network: Servicio Madrileño de Salud

Services
- Beds: 1,256

History
- Founded: 2 October 1973

Links
- Lists: Hospitals in Spain

The Hospital Universitario 12 de Octubre is a public district general hospital in the neighborhood of Orcasur, in Madrid, Spain. It is part of the hospital network of the Servicio Madrileño de Salud (SERMAS).

It is one of the healthcare institutions associated to the Complutense University of Madrid (UCM) for the purpose of clinical internship.

== History ==
The architectural project was led by Martín José Marcide, who had Fernando Flórez Plaza and Miguel Tapia-Ruano Rodrigáñez as collaborators, Federico Mestre Rossi and José Martí Barceló were the leading structural engineers. The floor plan followed the X-shaped structure characteristic of buildings such as the Memorial Unit's Grace-New Haven Community Hospital or the Wesley Foundation Memorial Unit in Chicago. For the lower floors a sui generis hexagonal-based outline was also employed. Built in 18 months, it was inaugurated by Francisco Franco on 2 October 1973 under the name of Ciudad Sanitaria 1º de octubre ("October 1st Health City"), a nod to his appointment as Head of State on 1 October 1936. Years after the death of the dictator, on 12 October 1988, the name was changed to "12 de Octubre".

As of 2017, it has 1,256 beds.
