= El Zofío =

Coordinates: 40°22′45″N 3°42′55″W

- City neighborhood
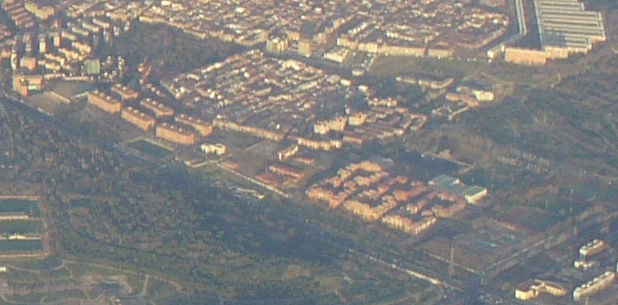
- Interactive map of El Zofío
- Country: Spain
- Aut. community: Community of Madrid
- Municipality: Madrid
- District: Usera

El Zofío is an administrative neighborhood (barrio) of Madrid belonging to the district of Usera.
