= Usera (Madrid Metro) =

Madrid Metro station

- Platform of the station

General information
- Location: Usera, Madrid; Spain
- Coordinates: 40.3870975°N 3.7068947°W
- System: Madrid Metro station
- Owner: CRTM
- Operator: CRTM

Construction
- Accessible: yes

Other information
- Fare zone: A

History
- Opened: 7 May 1981

Services
Preceding station	Madrid Metro	Following station
Plaza Elíptica clockwise / outer	Line 6	Legazpi anticlockwise / inner
Location
- Location within Madrid

Usera [uˈse.ɾa] is a station on Line 6 of the Madrid Metro. It is located in Zone A.
