= Hugh Thomas, Baron Thomas of Swynnerton =

British historian (1931–2017)

The Right Honourable The Lord Thomas of Swynnerton

Member of the House of Lords
- Lord Temporal
- Life peerage 16 June 1981 – 7 May 2017

Personal details
- Born: 21 October 1931 Windsor, Berkshire, England
- Died: 7 May 2017 (aged 85)
- Party: Crossbench (1999–2017)
- Other political affiliations: Labour (1957–1974); Conservative (1979–1997); Liberal Democrats (1997–1999)
- Spouse: Hon. Vanessa Jebb
- Children: 3
- Education: Sherborne School
- Alma mater: Queens' College, Cambridge; Sorbonne
- Occupation: Historian

Hugh Swynnerton Thomas, Baron Thomas of Swynnerton (21 October 1931 – 7 May 2017), was an English historian, writer, diplomat and political adviser known best for his book The Spanish Civil War.

== Early life ==
Hugh Swynnerton Thomas was born on 21 October 1931 in Windsor, Berkshire, England, to Hugh Whitelegge Thomas (1887–1960), a colonial commissioner in the Gold Coast and Cambridge cricketer, and his wife, Margery Augusta Angelo (née Swynnerton). Sir Shenton Thomas was his uncle. He was educated at Sherborne School in Dorset, before going up to Queens' College, Cambridge, where he was a major scholar and later an Honorary Fellow. Thomas gained a first class in Part I of the History Tripos in 1952, and the following year was president of the Cambridge Union Society. He also studied at the Sorbonne in Paris.

== Career ==
From 1954 to 1957, Thomas worked in the Foreign Office, partly as secretary of the British Delegation to the sub-committee of the UN Disarmament Commission, and in the British embassy in Paris under his future father-in-law Gladwyn Jebb. He lectured briefly at the Royal Military Academy at Sandhurst in 1957. After the success of his 1957 novel The World's Game, he accepted an offer from publisher James MacGibbon, then a literary agent at Curtis Brown, to pen the first "broad survey" of the Spanish Civil War, despite his lack of knowledge of Spanish, leading to the publication of his best-known work in 1961. From 1966 until resigning in 1976, he was Professor of History at the University of Reading, and chairman of the European committee. He was then chairman of the neoliberal Centre for Policy Studies in London from 1979 to 1991.

== Politics ==
At university, Thomas was involved with the Conservative Party. He joined the Labour Party soon after quitting his Foreign Office job in the atmosphere of a scandal in early 1957, and was blocked as a prospective Labour candidate for Ruislip and Northwood in 1957–58 by Revolutionary Socialist League members on the selection committee. He remained a Labour member until 1974, when he again failed to secure a parliamentary seat. He then became an unofficial adviser to Margaret Thatcher, embracing her political project. He was particularly influential during the Falklands War in 1982. He was created a life peer as Baron Thomas of Swynnerton, of Notting Hill in Greater London by letters patent dated 16 June 1981, and sat as a Conservative, before he joined the Liberal Democrats in late 1997, declaring concerns about Euroscepticism in the Conservative ranks. He later sat as a crossbencher.

He wrote political works favouring European integration, such as Europe: the Radical Challenge (1973), as well as histories. He was also the author of three novels: The World's Game (1957), The Oxygen Age (1958), and Klara (1988). Thomas's 1961 book The Spanish Civil War won the Somerset Maugham Award for 1962. A significantly revised and enlarged third edition was published in 1977; further editions were published in 1999 and 2012. Cuba, or the Pursuit of Freedom (1971) is a book of more than 1,500 pages tracing the history of Cuba from Spanish colonial rule until the Cuban Revolution. In 1985, Thomas signed a petition against the Sandinista National Liberation Front of Nicaragua, in support of the Contras, an anti-Sandinista paramilitary group.

In 1990, he was one of the leading historians behind the setting up of the History Curriculum Association. The Association advocated a more knowledge-based history curriculum in schools. It expressed "profound disquiet" at the way history was being taught in the classroom and observed that the integrity of history was threatened.

== Personal life ==
Thomas was married to Vanessa Jebb, a painter and a daughter of Gladwyn Jebb, the first Acting United Nations Secretary-General and British Ambassador to France. They had three children: Inigo, Isambard and Isabella.

== Awards ==
Thomas won the Somerset Maugham Award (1962), the Nonino Prize (2009), the Boccaccio Prize (2009), the Gabarrón Prize (2008) and the Calvo Serer Prize (2009). The French Government appointed him Commander of the Order of Arts and Letters in 2008.

Thomas also received the Grand Cross of the Royal Order of Isabella the Catholic from Spain, as well as the Mexican Order of the Aztec Eagle, the Joaquín Romero Murube Prize in Seville (2013) and the Grand Cross of the Civil Order of Alfonso X the Wise (2014).

== Works ==
- Disarmament – The Way Ahead (1957); a Fabian Society tract.
- The World's Game; a novel (1957).
- The Oxygen Age; a novel (1958).
- The Establishment: A Symposium (edited, 1959).
- The Spanish Civil War (1961); Penguin Books Ltd (1968); 2nd revised edition (1977); 4th revised edition (2003). A new revised edition in 2011 commemorated the book's reaching 50 consecutive years in print; it was published in 15 languages.
- The Story of Sandhurst (1961).
- The Suez Affair (1967; revised 1970); an analysis of the Suez Crisis of 1956.
- Crisis in the Civil Service (1968).
- Cuba or the Pursuit of Freedom (1971; revised 1998, 2002, 2010).
- Selected Writings by Jose Antonio Primo de Rivera (edited, 1972).
- Goya: The Third of May 1808 (1972).
- A History of Wales, 1485–1660 (1972).
- Europe: The Radical Challenge (1973).
- John Strachey (1973).
- An Unfinished History of the World (1979); published in the United States as A History of the World, then as World History (1998); and under the original title in London (by Hamish Hamilton) in 1979, and with revised editions in 1981 and 1982.
- The Revolution On Balance (1983), Washington, DC; Cuban American National Foundation 1983 (CANF pamphlet #5). online
- Havannah; a novel (1984).
- Armed Truce: The Beginnings of the Cold War, 1945–46 (1986). online
- Central America: Can Europe Play a Part? (1987); an Institute for European Defence and Strategic Studies paper.
- Klara; a novel (1988).
- Madrid: A Travellers' Companion (1988; revised 2005).
- Ever Closer Union: Britain's Destiny in Europe (1991).
- The Conquest of Mexico (1993); published in the United States as Conquest: Montezuma, Cortés and the Fall of Old Mexico.
- The Slave Trade: The History of the Atlantic Slave Trade 1440–1870 (1997); Simon & Schuster.
- Who Is Who of the Conquistadors (2000). A study of those who fought for Cortés.
- Rivers of Gold (2003); the first book in a trilogy about the Spanish Empire.
- Beaumarchais in Seville (2006); ISBN 978-0-300-12103-2.
- Eduardo Barreiros and the Recovery of Spain (2009); a biography of Eduardo Barreiros.
- The Golden Age: The Spanish Empire of Charles V (2010); the second book in a trilogy about the Spanish Empire. Published in the United States as The Golden Empire: Spain, Charles V, and the Creation of America (2011).
- World Without End: The Global Empire of Philip II (2014); the third volume in a trilogy about the Spanish Empire.

== Arms ==
Coat of arms of Hugh Thomas, Baron Thomas of Swynnerton

Coronet
Coronet of a Baron
Crest
Upon a Chapeau Gules, turned up Ermine, issuant from a representation of the Torre d'Arnolfo on the Palazzo Vicariale at Scarperia in Italy Argent, a Bull's Head Sable, armed Or.
Escutcheon
Quarterly Argent and Or, a Cross formée flory Sable, surmounted by a Dragons Head erased Gules.
Supporters
On either side a Falcon wings expanded and addorsed Argent, beaked, armed and belled Or, legged Gules, gorged with a Torse Or and Gules, and holding in the beak a Quill Argent, penned Or.
Compartment
A Grassy Mound proper, thereon a Bar embowed Or, charged with a Barrulet embowed wavy Azure.
Motto
LATE BUT IN TIME
