= Almendrales =

- Ward
- Interactive map of Almendrales
- Country: Spain
- Aut. community: Madrid
- Municipality: Madrid
- District: Usera

Almendrales is a ward (barrio) of Madrid belonging to the district of Usera.
