= Orcasur =

Coordinates: 40°22′2″N 3°41′57″W

- City neighborhood
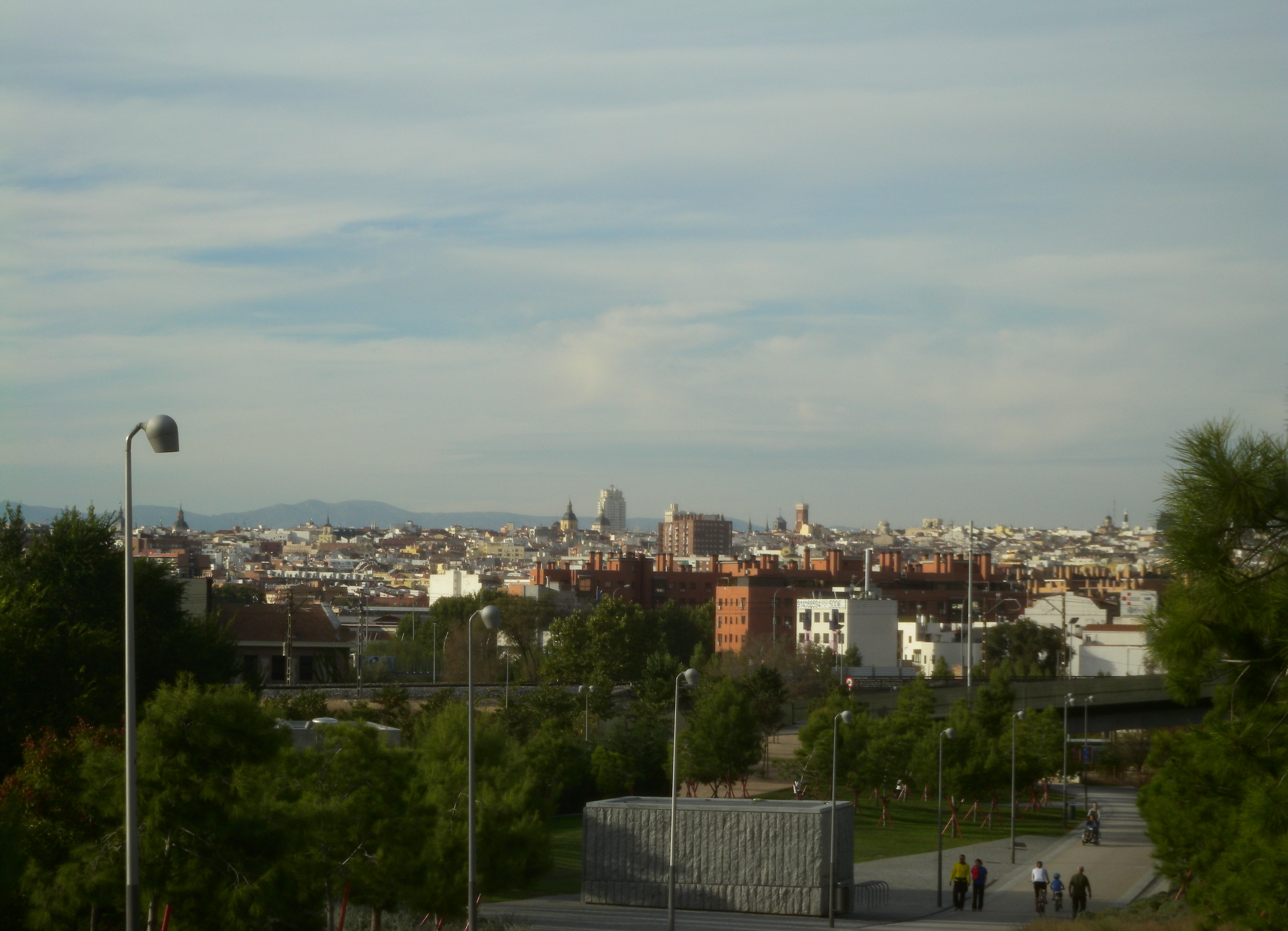

- Country: Spain
- Region: Community of Madrid
- Municipality: Madrid
- District: Usera

Area
  - Total: 1.384234 km^{2} (0.534456 sq mi)

Population (2020)
  - Total: 14,264
  - Density: 10,305/km^{2} (26,689/sq mi)

Orcasur is an administrative neighborhood (barrio) of Madrid belonging to the district of Usera. It has an area of 1.384234 km^{2} (0.534456 sq mi). As of 1 March 2020, it has a total population of 14,264. The Hospital Universitario 12 de Octubre is located in the neighborhood.
