= Moscardó =

Coordinates: 40°23′24″N 3°42′28″W

- City neighborhood
- Country: Spain
- Aut. community: Community of Madrid
- Municipality: Madrid
- District: Usera

Moscardó is an administrative neighborhood (barrio) of Madrid belonging to the district of Usera.
