= San Fermín (Madrid) =

Ward of Madrid, Spain

Coordinates: 40°22′18″N 3°41′18″W

- Ward of Madrid
- Country: Spain
- Aut. community: Madrid
- Municipality: Madrid
- District: Usera

San Fermín is a ward (barrio) of Madrid belonging to the district of Usera. The biggest tourist attractions in the neighborhood are the "Caja Mágica" and the "Lineal del Manzanares" park.
