= Ciudad de los Ángeles (Madrid Metro) =

Madrid Metro station

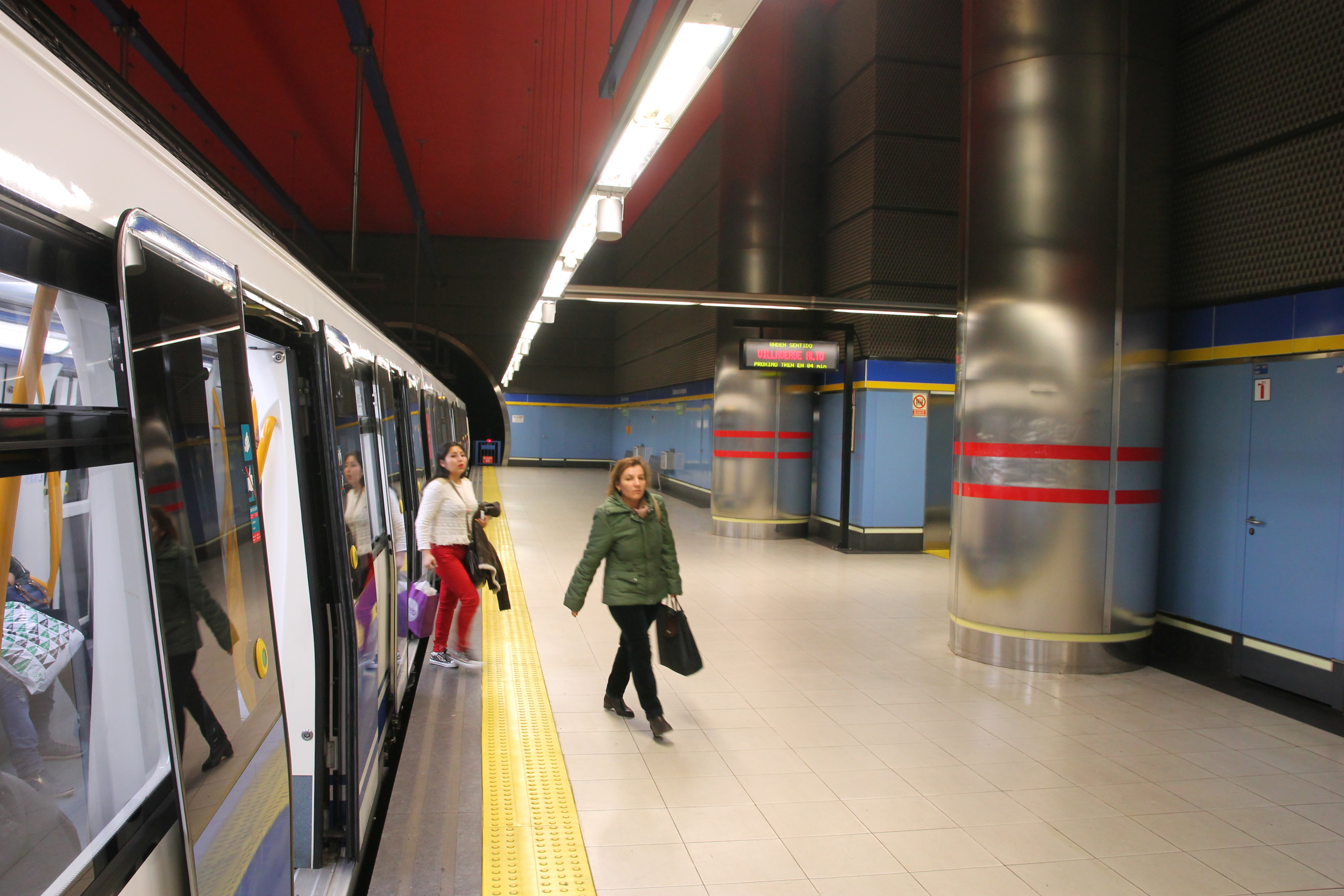
- Platform of the station

General information
- Location: Villaverde, Madrid; Spain
- Coordinates: 40.3595825°N 3.6936297°W
- System: Madrid Metro station
- Owner: CRTM
- Operator: CRTM

Construction
- Structure type: Underground
- Accessible: Yes

Other information
- Fare zone: A

History
- Opened: 21 April 2007; 19 years ago

Services
Preceding station	Madrid Metro	Following station
Villaverde Bajo-Cruce towards El Casar	Line 3	San Fermín-Orcasur towards Moncloa
Location
- Location within Madrid

Ciudad de los Ángeles [θjuˈðað ðe los ˈaŋxeles] is a station on Line 3 of the Madrid Metro, serving the Los Ángeles barrio. It is located in fare Zone A.
