= Villaverde Bajo-Cruce (Madrid Metro) =

Madrid Metro station

General information
- Location: Villaverde, Madrid; Spain
- Coordinates: 40.3508945°N 3.6926458°W
- System: Madrid Metro station
- Owner: CRTM
- Operator: CRTM

Construction
- Structure type: Underground
- Accessible: Yes

Other information
- Fare zone: A

History
- Opened: 21 April 2007; 19 years ago

Services
Preceding station	Madrid Metro	Following station
San Cristóbal towards El Casar	Line 3	Ciudad de los Ángeles towards Moncloa
Location
- Location within Madrid

Villaverde Bajo-Cruce (Spanish pronunciation: [biʎaˈβeɾðe ˈβaxo ˈkɾuθe]; "Lower Villaverde–Crossroads") is a station on Line 3 of the Madrid Metro. It is located in fare Zone A. Its name refers to the intersection of the Avenida de Andalucía and the Carretera de Villaverde a Vallecas.

It should not be confused with the homonymous station of Cercanías Madrid, as there is no direct access between the two stations.

== History ==
The station was a proposed stop on the Madrid Metro Line 3 extension planned in 2006. The station opened to the public on 21 April 2007 along with other stations on the line extension, improving connections between the area and central Madrid.
