= Embajadores (Madrid Metro) =

Madrid Metro station

Coordinates: 40.4052°N 3.7029°W

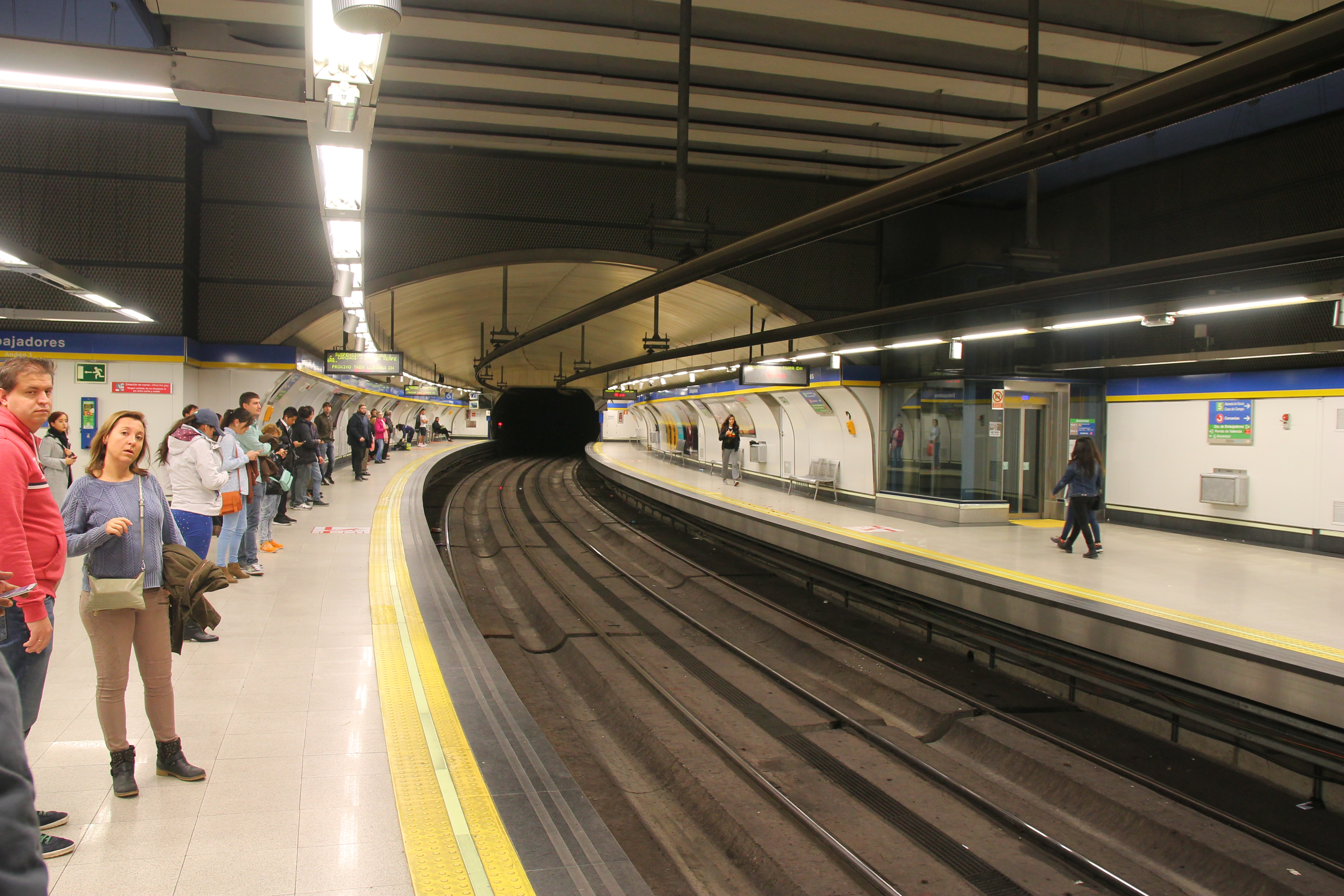
- Line 3 platforms, Embajadores

General information
- Location: Arganzuela / Centro, Madrid; Spain
- System: Madrid Metro station
- Owner: CRTM
- Operator: CRTM

Construction
- Structure type: Underground
- Accessible: Yes

Other information
- Fare zone: A

History
- Opened: 9 August 1936; 90 years ago

Services
Preceding station	Madrid Metro	Following station
Palos de la Frontera towards El Casar	Line 3	Lavapiés towards Moncloa
Out of system interchange
Preceding station	Cercanías Madrid	Following station
Laguna towards Móstoles-El Soto	C-5	Atocha towards Humanes
Location
- Location within Madrid

Embajadores [embaxaˈðoɾes] is a station on the Madrid Metro. It's named after Calle de Embajadores, "Ambassadors' Street"). It is located in fare Zone A. The station offers connection to Cercanías Madrid via Embajadores railway station.
