= Villaverde Alto (Madrid Metro) =

Madrid Metro station

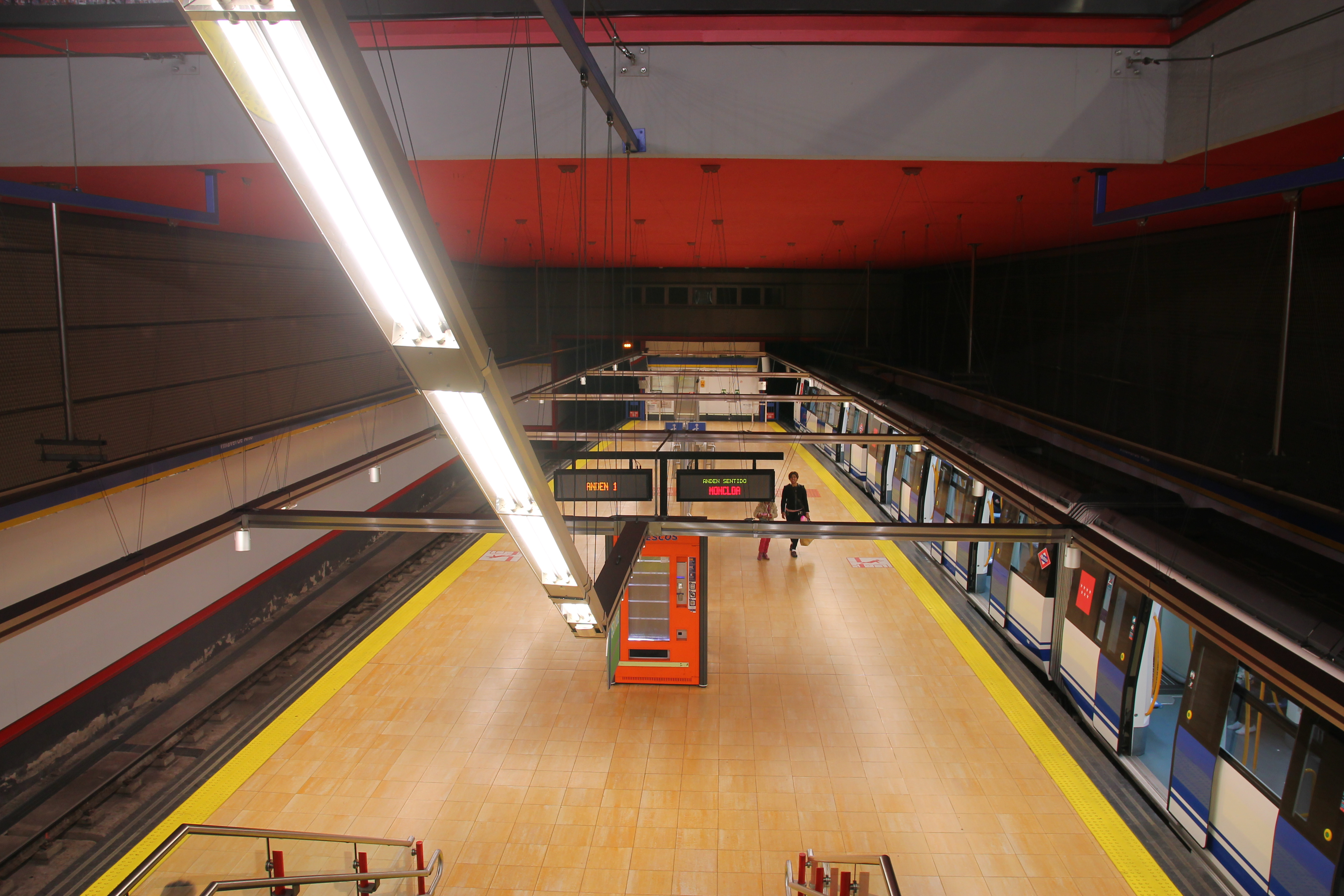

General information
- Location: Villaverde, Madrid; Spain
- Coordinates: 40.34163°N 3.712478°W
- System: Madrid Metro station
- Owner: CRTM
- Operator: CRTM

Construction
- Structure type: Underground
- Accessible: Yes

Other information
- Fare zone: A

History
- Opened: 21 April 2007; 19 years ago

Services
Preceding station	Madrid Metro	Following station
El Casar Terminus	Line 3	San Cristóbal towards Moncloa
Preceding station	Cercanías Madrid	Following station
Villaverde Bajo towards Alcobendas-San Sebastián de los Reyes or Colmenar Viejo	C-4	Las Margaritas-Universidad towards Parla
Puente Alcocer towards Móstoles-El Soto	C-5	Zarzaquemada towards Humanes
Location
- Location within Madrid

Villaverde Alto (Spanish pronunciation: [biʎaˈβeɾðe ˈalto]; "Upper Villaverde") is a station on Line 3 of the Madrid Metro. It is located in fare Zone A.
