= Delicias (Madrid Metro) =

Madrid Metro station

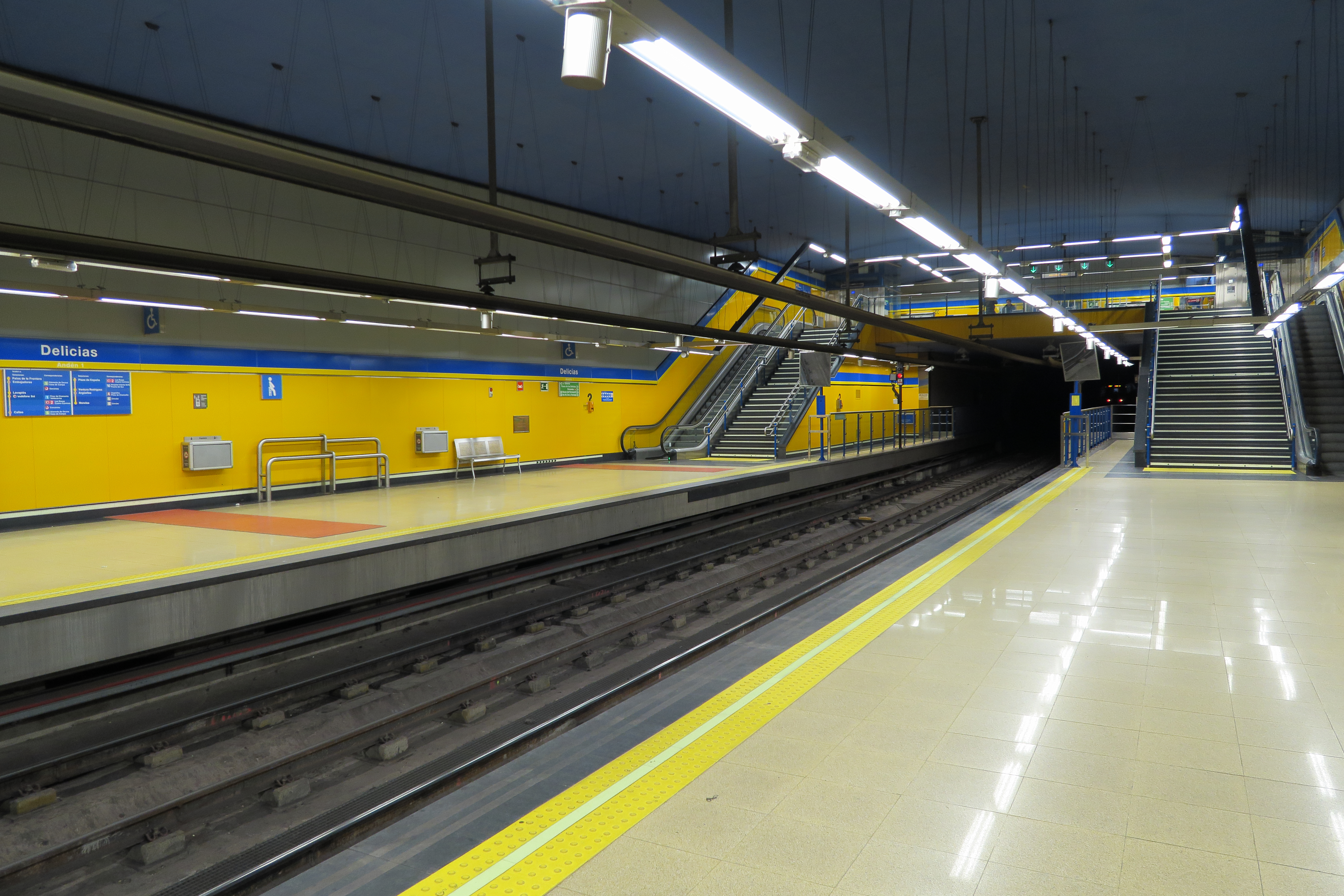
- Platforms of the station

General information
- Location: Arganzuela, Madrid; Spain
- Coordinates: 40.3999161°N 3.6941609°W
- System: Madrid Metro station
- Owner: CRTM
- Operator: CRTM

Construction
- Structure type: Underground
- Accessible: Yes

Other information
- Fare zone: A

History
- Opened: 26 March 1949; 77 years ago

Services
Preceding station	Madrid Metro	Following station
Legazpi towards El Casar	Line 3	Palos de la Frontera towards Moncloa
Location
- Location within Madrid

Delicias [deˈliθjas] is a Madrid Metro station in Madrid city centre, serving the Delicias barrio. It was opened on 26 March 1949 and is situated near the Railway Museum.

It should not be confused with the similarly named station of Cercanías Madrid, as there is no direct access between the two.
