= Palos de la Frontera (Madrid Metro) =

Madrid Metro station

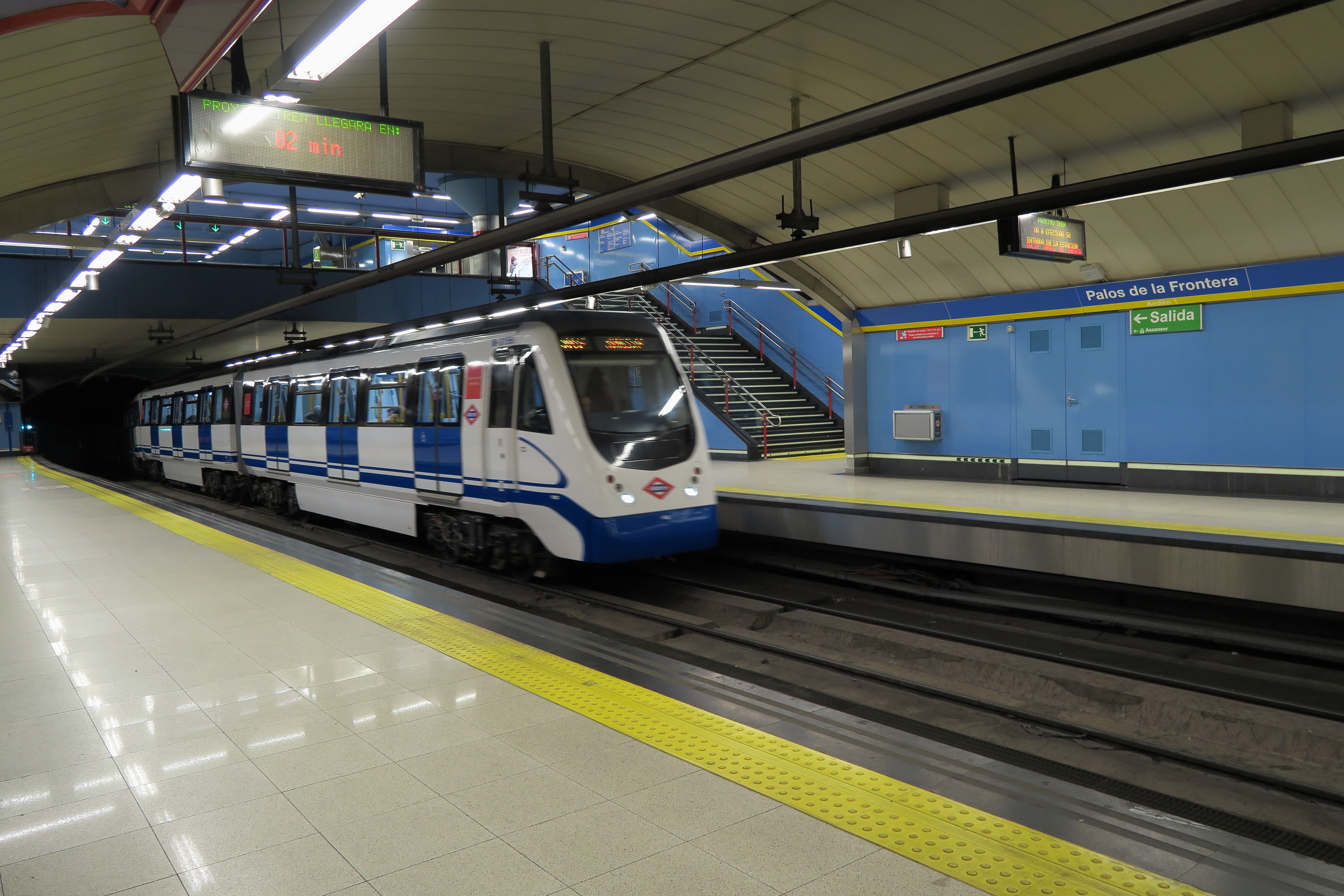

General information
- Location: Arganzuela, Madrid; Spain
- Coordinates: 40.4030775°N 3.6941743°W
- System: Madrid Metro station
- Owner: CRTM
- Operator: CRTM

Construction
- Structure type: Underground
- Accessible: Yes

Other information
- Fare zone: A

History
- Opened: 26 March 1949; 77 years ago

Services
Preceding station	Madrid Metro	Following station
Delicias towards El Casar	Line 3	Embajadores towards Moncloa
Location
- Location within Madrid

Palos de la Frontera [ˈpalos ðe la fɾonˈteɾa] is a station on Line 3 of the Madrid Metro, serving the Palos de la Frontera barrio, named after the town of the same name in south Spain, It is located in fare Zone A.
