= Lavapiés (Madrid Metro) =

Madrid Metro station

- Platforms of the station

General information
- Location: Centro, Madrid; Spain
- Coordinates: 40.4085124°N 3.700908°W
- System: Madrid Metro station
- Owner: CRTM
- Operator: CRTM

Construction
- Structure type: Underground
- Accessible: Yes

Other information
- Fare zone: A

History
- Opened: 9 August 1936; 90 years ago

Services
Preceding station	Madrid Metro	Following station
Embajadores towards El Casar	Line 3	Sol towards Moncloa
Location
- Location within Madrid

Lavapiés ([ˌlaβaˈpjes]) is a station on Line 3 of the Madrid Metro, serving the Lavapiés neighbourhood. It is located in fare Zone A.
