= Legazpi (Madrid Metro) =

Madrid Metro station

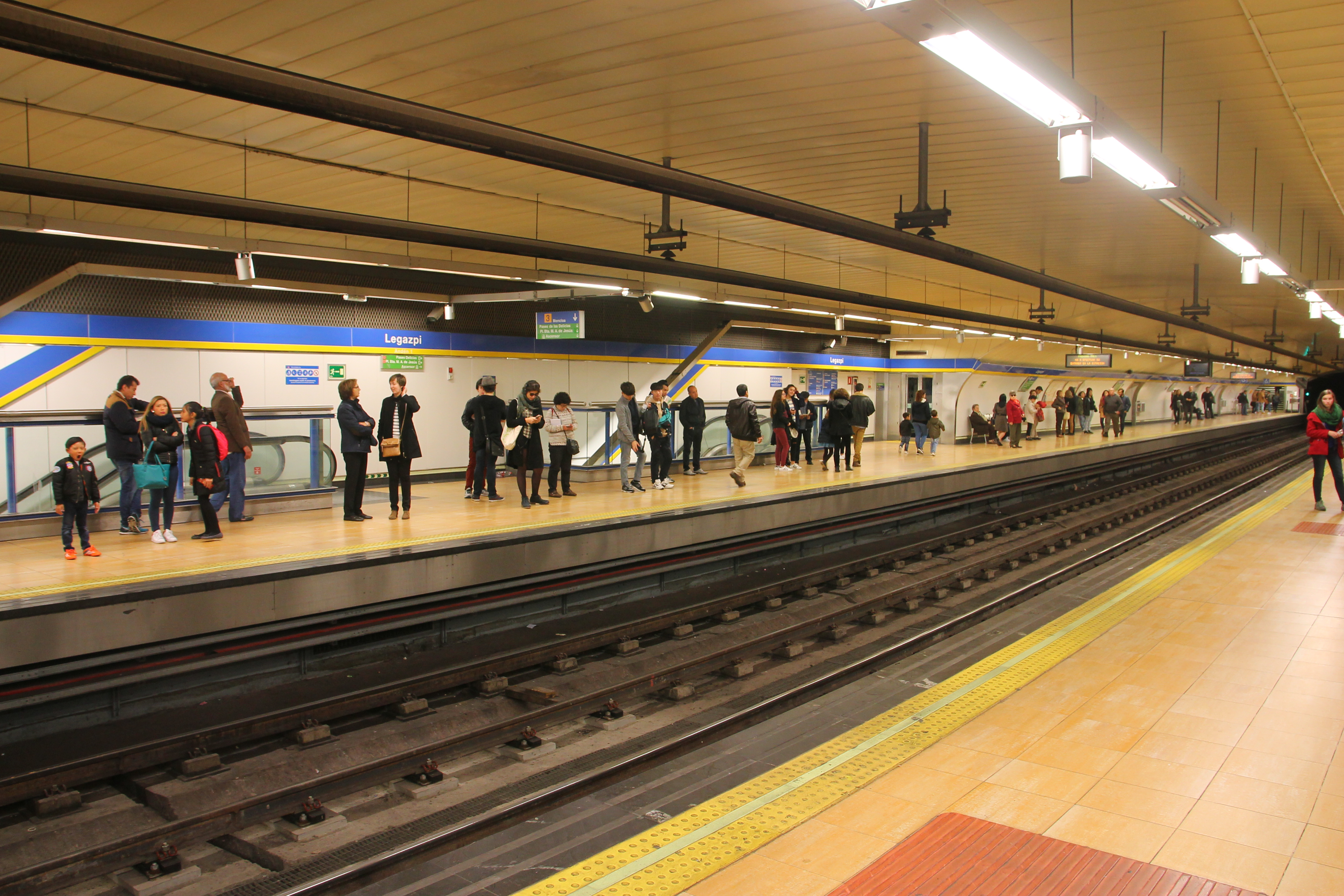

General information
- Location: Arganzuela, Madrid; Spain
- Coordinates: 40.3911507°N 3.6951198°W
- System: Madrid Metro station
- Owner: CRTM
- Operator: CRTM

Construction
- Structure type: Underground
- Accessible: Yes

Other information
- Fare zone: A

History
- Opened: 1 March 1951; 75 years ago

Services
Preceding station	Madrid Metro	Following station
Almendrales towards El Casar	Line 3	Delicias towards Moncloa
Usera clockwise / outer	Line 6	Arganzuela-Planetario anticlockwise / inner
Location
- Location within Madrid

Legazpi [leˈɣaθpi] is a station on Line 3 and Line 6 of the Madrid Metro, serving the Legazpi barrio. It is located in Zone A.

Carlos Palomino was murdered at the station in 2007.
