= Line 3 (Madrid Metro) =

Rapid transit line of the Madrid Metro

Coordinates: 40.4084°N 3.7008°W

- Two Class 3000 trains at Almendrales station

Overview
- Native name: Línea 3
- Owner: CRTM
- Locale: Madrid
- Termini: El Casar; Moncloa
- Stations: 19
- Website: metromadrid.es/en/linea/linea-3

Service
- Type: Rapid transit
- System: Madrid Metro
- Operator: CRTM
- Rolling stock: CAF 3000

History
- Opened: 6 August 1936; 90 years ago
- Last extension: 2025

Technical
- Line length: 16.424 km (10.205 mi)
- Character: Underground
- Track gauge: 1,445 mm (4 ft 8 7/8 in)

Line 3 is a rapid transit line of the Madrid Metro in Madrid. It contains 19 stations across 16.424 kilometres (10.205 mi).

== History ==
The line was opened on 9 August 1936 between Sol and Embajadores, a few days before the beginning of the Spanish Civil War. In 1941 it was extended from Sol to Argüelles, in 1949 from Embajadores to Delicias, in 1951 from Delicias to Legazpi, in 1963 from Argüelles to Moncloa.

In 2007, the platforms were lengthened to 90 metres (300 ft) to allow for 6-car trains of CAF class 3000. During this process, all of the stations were modernized and rebuilt, thus giving the original section of Line 3 a brand new look. Moncloa station was completely rebuilt adjacent to that of the Line 6, proving an easy connection between the two lines.

On 21 April 2007, the line was extended from Legazpi to Villaverde Alto, doubling its length. This was the first extension of the line since 1951. Further extensions on both ends of the line have been proposed.

On 21 April 2025, the line was extended to El Casar station, connecting with Line 12 and Cercanías Line C-3.

== Stations ==
Municipality	District	Station	Opened	Zone	Connections
Getafe	Getafe North	El Casar	2025	B1	Madrid Metro: Cercanías Madrid:
Madrid	Villaverde	Villaverde Alto	2007	A	Cercanías Madrid:
Madrid	Villaverde	San Cristóbal	2007	A	
Madrid	Villaverde	Villaverde Bajo-Cruce	2007	A	
Madrid	Villaverde	Ciudad de los Ángeles	2007	A	
Madrid	Usera	San Fermín-Orcasur	2007	A	
Madrid	Usera	Hospital 12 de Octubre	2007	A	
Madrid	Usera	Almendrales	2007	A	
Madrid	Arganzuela	Legazpi	1951	A	Madrid Metro:
Madrid	Arganzuela	Delicias	1949	A	Cercanías Madrid:
Madrid	Arganzuela	Palos de la Frontera	1949	A	
Madrid	Arganzuela / Centro	Acacias-Embajadores	1936	A	Madrid Metro: Cercanías Madrid:
Madrid	Centro	Lavapiés	1936	A	
Madrid	Centro	Sol	1919	A	Madrid Metro: Cercanías Madrid:
Madrid	Centro	Callao	1941	A	Madrid Metro:
Madrid	Centro / Moncloa-Aravaca	Plaza de España-Noviciado	1925	A	Madrid Metro:
Madrid	Centro / Moncloa-Aravaca	Ventura Rodríguez	1941	A	
Madrid	Centro / Moncloa-Aravaca / Chamberí	Argüelles	1941	A	Madrid Metro:
Madrid	Moncloa-Aravaca / Chamberí	Moncloa	1963	A	Madrid Metro:

== See also ==
- Madrid
- Transport in Madrid
- List of Madrid Metro stations
- List of metro systems
