= Murder of Carlos Palomino =

Political assassination in Madrid, Spain

Carlos Javier Palomino Muñoz (3 May 1991 – 11 November 2007) was a 16-year-old teenager who was murdered in Madrid, Spain. While traveling with 100 others to attend a counter-protest to a neo-Nazi rally, he was stabbed to death at Legazpi Station.

Josué Estébanez de la Hija, the man who stabbed him, was originally from the Basque Country and was a soldier in the Spanish army. He received a 26-year prison sentence.

== Background ==
On the morning of 11 November 2007, a demonstration against immigration had been called by the far right-wing party Democracia Nacional, in a neighbourhood with a significant immigrant presence, which had been communicated and accepted by the Government Delegation in Madrid. According to the judicial summary, Josué Estébanez (Galdacano, 1984), was supposed to be on his way to take part in the demonstration, a fact he denied. According to his version, he was going to have lunch in Villaverde with some friends.

Thanks to the metro's video surveillance cameras, it can be seen how, at Legazpi station on line 3, around one hundred antifascists board a train on their way to take part in the counter-demonstration. In that carriage is Josué Estébanez, who takes out a knife from his pocket and hides it behind his back. Estébanez is wearing a Three Stroke branded sweatshirt, identified as a far-right skinhead symbol. One of the antifascist men getting into the carriage notices that Josué Estébanez is carrying the knife, but Carlos Palomino does not, and reprimands Estébanez about his sweatshirt. At that moment, Estébanez fatally stabs Palomino in the heart.

After the incident, Josué stabbed another young man, who was injured but survived. Estebanez also cut the finger of a third antifascist who tried to stop him. Finally, police came into the metro station, and shot smoke grenades. Josué Estébanez then fled outside and threw the knife on the floor. He encountered another band of antifascists outside of the station and was intercepted by some of Palomino's companions. He was finally arrested by a Municipal Police patrol and was driven to a hospital in emergency to be treated. That same night, he was detained in Soto del Real and later transferred to Alcalá Meco to await trial. He was then judged and sentenced to 26 years.

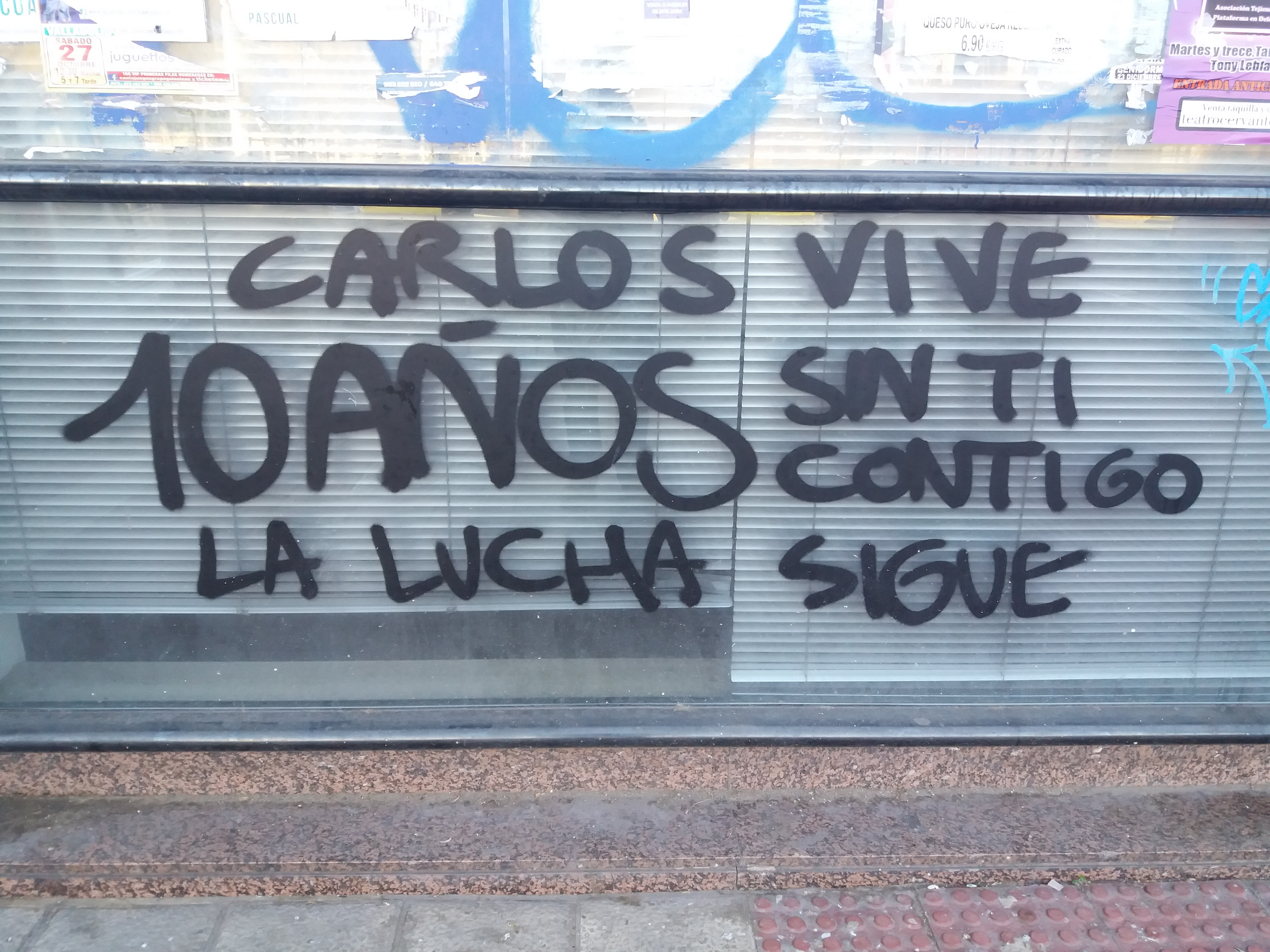
Graffiti in memory of Carlos Palomino (Valladolid)

Carlos Palomino died minutes after the stabbing in a makeshift medical tent on Paseo de las Delicias in Madrid.

== Trial and sentencing ==
During the trial, which was attended as a private prosecution Palomino's mother, the antifascists who accompanied him, and Esteban Ibarra – leader of the Movement against Intolerance – as part of the popular prosecution, the facts of murder were considered proven after viewing the video surveillance cameras. Josué Estébanez was considered a right-wing extremist due to his clothing, as well as gestures that could be observed in the footage, such as the shout and greeting "Sieg Heil". At all times, the accused tried to distance himself from the far-right movement, despite the fact that various fascist and neo-Nazi associations openly showed their support for him. Psychotic and mental factors were also ruled out. During the trial, Estébanez showed no remorse for the acts; he only intervened on the last day of the trial to ask for forgiveness for what had happened.

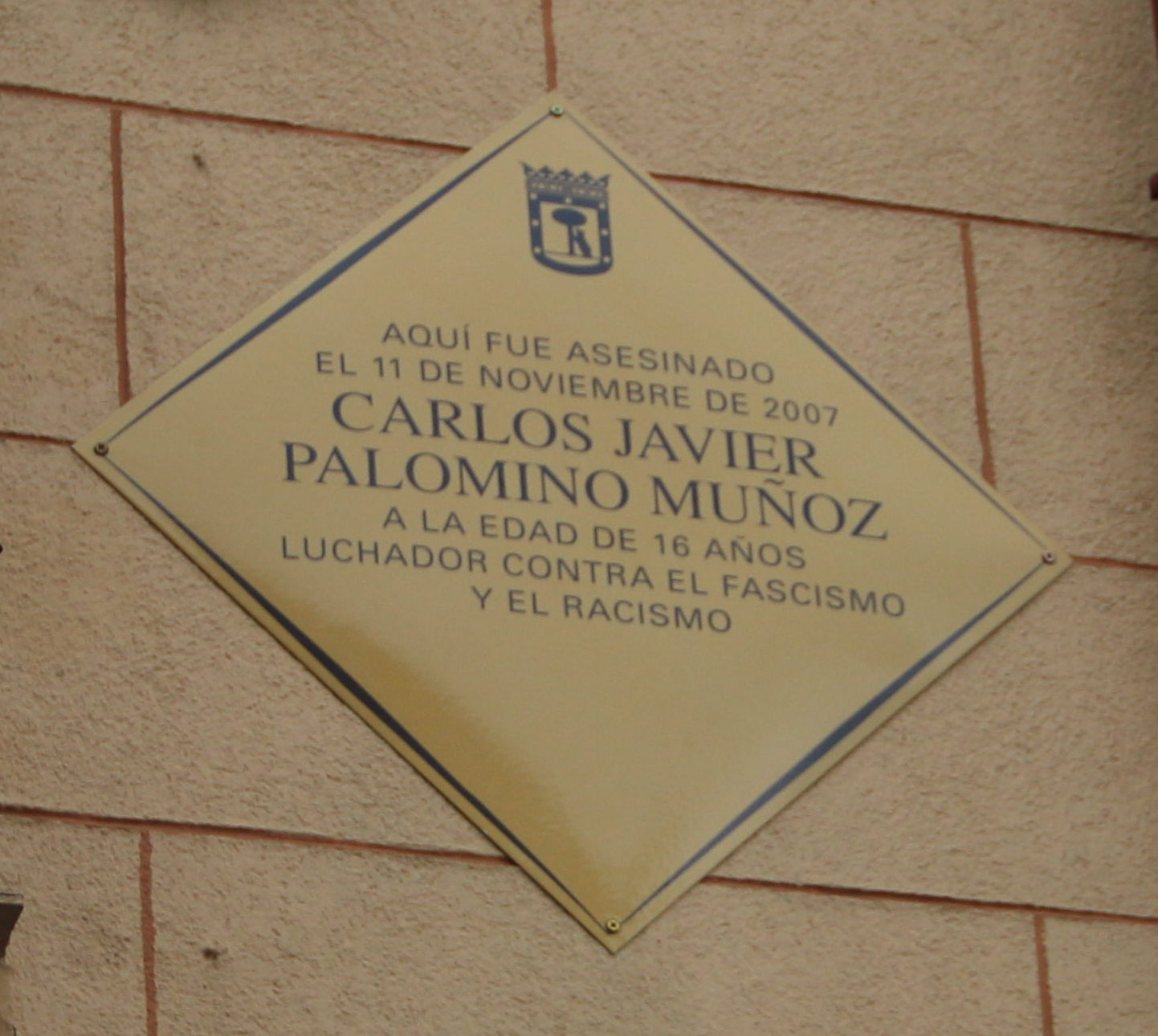
Tribute to Carlos Palomino by Rommy Arce, Celia Mayer, Maby Muñoz (Carlos' mother) and the Mothers against repression collective – 26990187395 (cropped)

The defence requested a prison sentence of six months for reckless homicide and three months for a crime of injury for the stabbing of a second person. After two years of trial, the Provincial Court of Madrid sentenced Josué Estébanez to a total of 26 years in prison – 19 years for murder with the aggravating circumstance of ideological hatred and 7 years for attempted homicide, coupled with a compensation of 150,000 euros. The family asked for 37 years in prison and compensation, while the Alto del Arenal residents' association and the Movement against Intolerance asked for 30 years for hate crime. The sentence was confirmed in its entirety in cassation by the Second Chamber of the Supreme Court in its judgement 360/2010 of 22 April, making the conviction final.

== Consequences and tributes ==
The murder of Carlos Palomino was the most publicised neo-Nazi hate crime of the first decade of the 21st century in Spain. It was also the first time that the Spanish judiciary applied the aggravating factor of ideological motives in a conviction.

After Palomino's death, his mother, Mavi Muñoz, became an anti-fascist activist. She founded the Association of Victims of Fascist, Racist and Homophobic Violence, to fight against fascist violence and demand the outlawing of these groups, and is a member of the association Mothers Against Repression of which she is honorary president.

Anti-fascist collectives placed plaques on up to four occasions at the Metro stations where Carlos Palomino had died, but they were always vandalised. In 2016, Madrid City Council placed a plaque at number 145 Paseo de las Delicias, where Palomino was murdered.

The plaque reads:

"Aquí fue asesinado el 11 de noviembre de 2007 Carlos Javier Palomino Muñoz a la edad de 16 años, luchador contra el fascismo y el racismo" (Here, on the 11th of November 2007, Carlos Javier Palomino Muñoz was killed at the age of 16. A fighter against fascism and racism.)

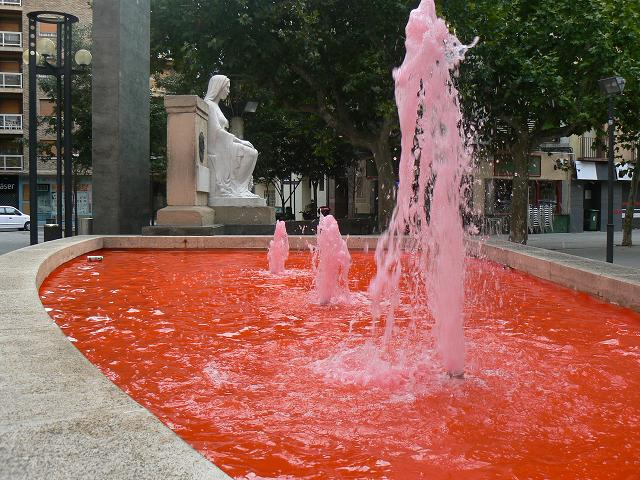
Zaragoza fountains dyed red in homage to Carlos Palomino (2008).

Every 11 November, various anti-fascist groups organise demonstrations to pay tribute to Carlos Palomino, who has become a symbol of their struggle. In 2017, the tenth anniversary of the crime, a demonstration was organised in Madrid, attended by around a thousand people. On that date, protest actions were also held in other Spanish cities. As a memorial, the water in various fountains is often dyed red during demonstrations.

A group of Spaniards, in imitation of the International Brigades, formed the Carlos Palomino Brigade in 2014 to fight on the Russian side in the war in Donbas.

In the Christchurch mosque shootings in March 2019, the perpetrator, Brenton Tarrant, wrote the name of Josué Estébanez on one of his weapons. This alongside other far-right terrorists and attackers such as Anders Behring Breivik and Dylann Roof.
