= Arganzuela-Planetario (Madrid Metro) =

Madrid Metro station

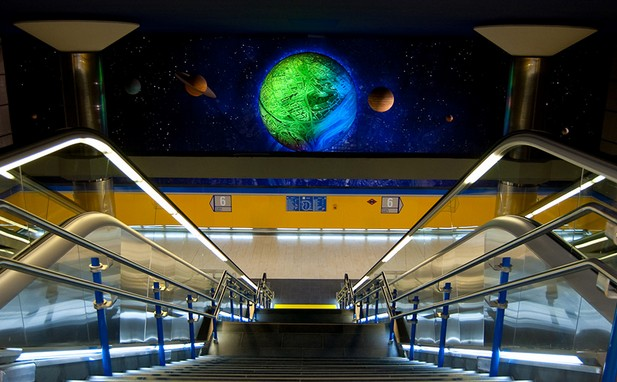
- The artwork refers to the nearby planetarium

General information
- Location: Arganzuela, Madrid; Spain
- Coordinates: 40.3931948°N 3.6886229°W
- System: Madrid Metro station
- Owner: CRTM
- Operator: CRTM

Construction
- Accessible: yes

Other information
- Fare zone: A

History
- Opened: 26 January 2007

Services
Preceding station	Madrid Metro	Following station
Legazpi clockwise / outer	Line 6	Méndez Álvaro anticlockwise / inner
Location
- Location within Madrid

Arganzuela-Planetario ([aɾɣanˈθwela planeˈtaɾjo], "Arganzuela–Planetarium") is a station on Line 6 of the Madrid Metro, serving the Arganzuela barrio and the Madrid Planetarium. It is located in Zone A.
