= Chawl =

Type of Indian residential building

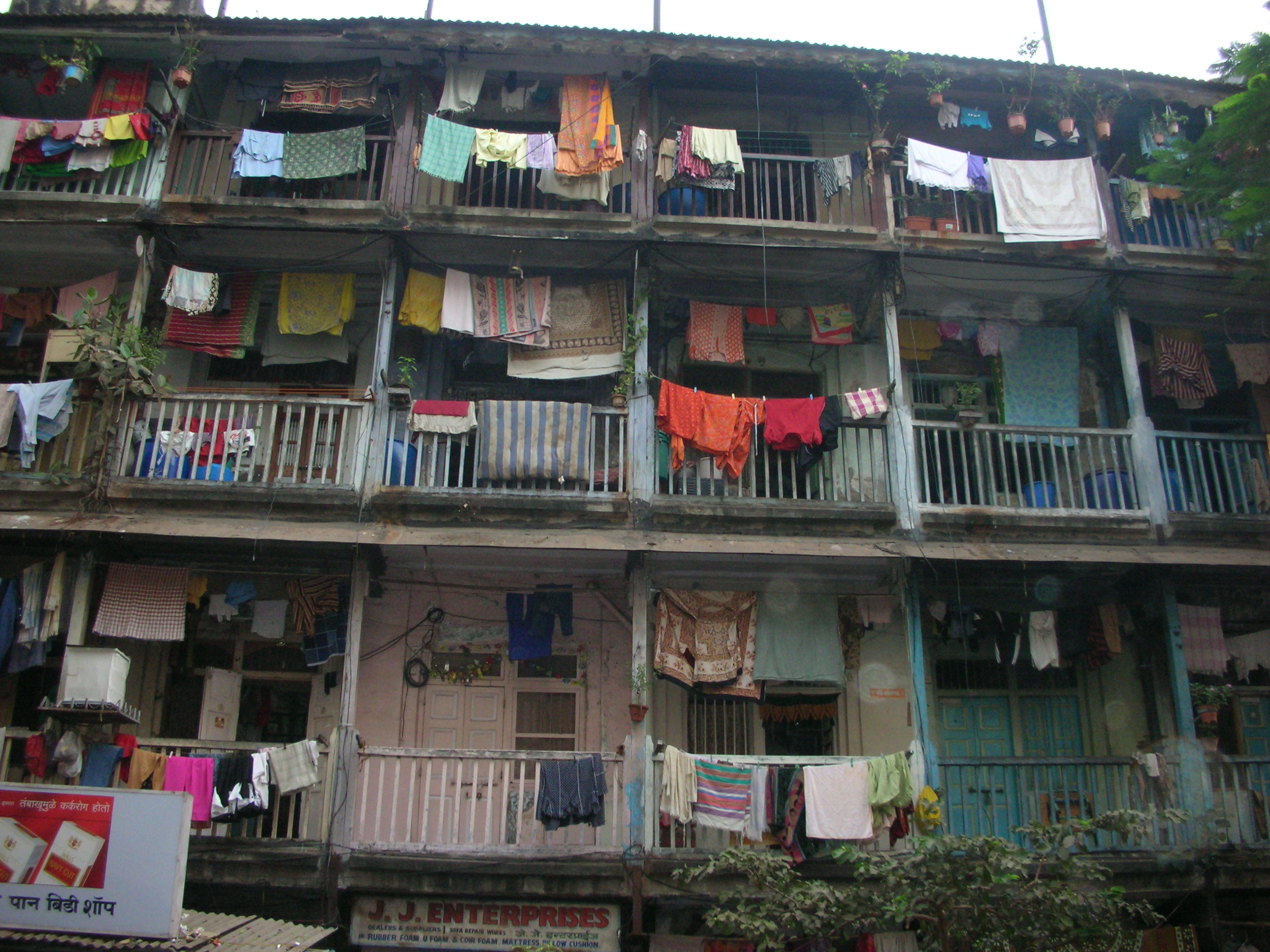
A chawl in Mumbai

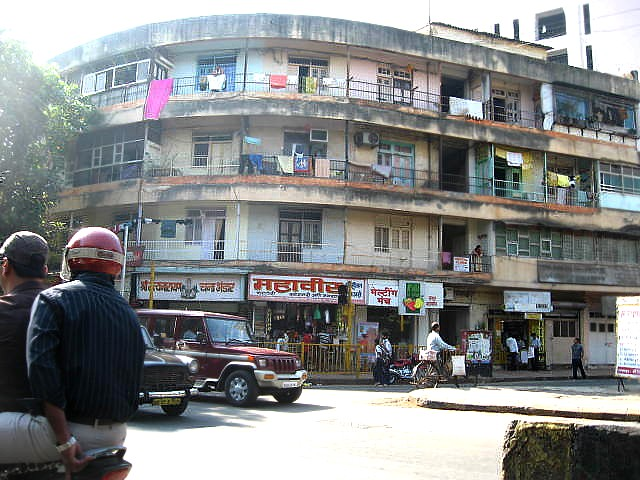
Chawls in Dadar, Mumbai

A chawl (Marathi: चाळ) is a type of residential building found in western India, similar to a tenement. Typically low quality housing, chawls are generally associated with poverty. The first chawls were constructed in the early 1700s, as housing for industrial workers.

== History ==
Chawls are rooted in the history of Bombay's (now Mumbai) colonial past. Workers migrated to Bombay from far and wide, as it was the center of trade for the East India Company. However, due to the land being unequally divided, British merchants and officials lived in sprawling bungalows, leaving little space for the working class. To accommodate this workforce, Chawls sprung up. These were tiny one room apartments shared by up to five people. Being highly congested, unsanitary, and unsafe, these were also more expensive than comparable accommodation in other Indian cities.

Town planning in Bombay finally came about because of fears of a plague epidemic, due to which The City Of Bombay Improvement Trust was established in 1898. Initial projects failed, displacing far more than they resettled. However, subsequent projects saw greater success, which largely included land reclamation projects to connect the Seven Islands of Bombay. This, along with modern apartments, led to availability of better housing, due to which chawls have declined. However, they may still be seen in the poorer parts of Mumbai.

== Description ==
=== Building layout ===
Chawls are typically 4 to 5 stories tall, with between 8 and 16 dwellings on each floor. These dwellings are known as kholis (room). A central staircase services the building and gives access to a long passage that runs the length of each floor. Many chawls are also built around a small courtyard, which functions as a communal space for residents. As many chawls are made with wood and often not subject to repairs, they become unstable or unsafe to live in over time, sometimes requiring relocation of the residents for fear that the structure may collapse.

=== Sanitation ===
Families on a floor have to share a common block of latrines. Tenements with private bathrooms are highly sought after and may be 50% more expensive than the price of a normal chawl. The lack of bathrooms has been credited with furthering disease outbreaks in chawls. Infestations of insects such as cockroaches or centipedes are not uncommon either, and with no rules about littering, sanitary conditions are usually very poor.

== Life for residents ==
Despite poor sanitation and living conditions, chawls are often seen as "middle class" housing, and are often more affordable than much of the housing in Mumbai. Some chawls have shops or businesses incorporated into their structure, which provide employment or shopping opportunities to the inhabitants.

Residents of chawls sometimes cite a sense of community where everything is shared amongst themselves; the cramped design of chawls forces social interaction between residents and very often special occasions, such as weddings or religious festivals, are celebrated communally.

== In popular culture ==
In Mulk Raj Anand's novel Coolie, the central character Munoo lives with two family groups in a chawl during his time in Bombay, with detailed descriptions of the living circumstances. The 2019 Marathi-language drama film, 15 August (Marathi: १५ ऑगस्ट) revolves around life in a chawl, with the majority of the filming taking place there. In Kiran Nagarkar's novel Ravan & Eddie, both main characters and their families live in a chawl.

Chawls are featured in the Mumbai level in the game Hitman 2.

In Tarak Mehta's Duniya Ne Undha Chashma (the source text of the famous Indian sitcom Tarak Mehta Ke Ooltha Chashma), the setting is in a chawl rather than a modern apartment complex like the one depicted in the show.

== See also ==
- Cortiço – a term used in Brazil and Portugal for an area of concentrated, high density urban housing, Cortiço houses are typically divided into small rooms that are rented.
- Casa di ringhiera a very similar type of housing built in the same period, and for the same purposes in Northern Italy.
- Corrala, casa de corredor, or edificación de vecindad, a similar structure typical of Madrid, but also found in some other towns in Castile, as well as in parts of Andalusia and some other cities in Spain.
- Corral de comedias, this same structure used as a venue for theater, especially in Madrid during the Spanish Golden Age.
