= Corrala =

Type of housing in Madrid, Spain

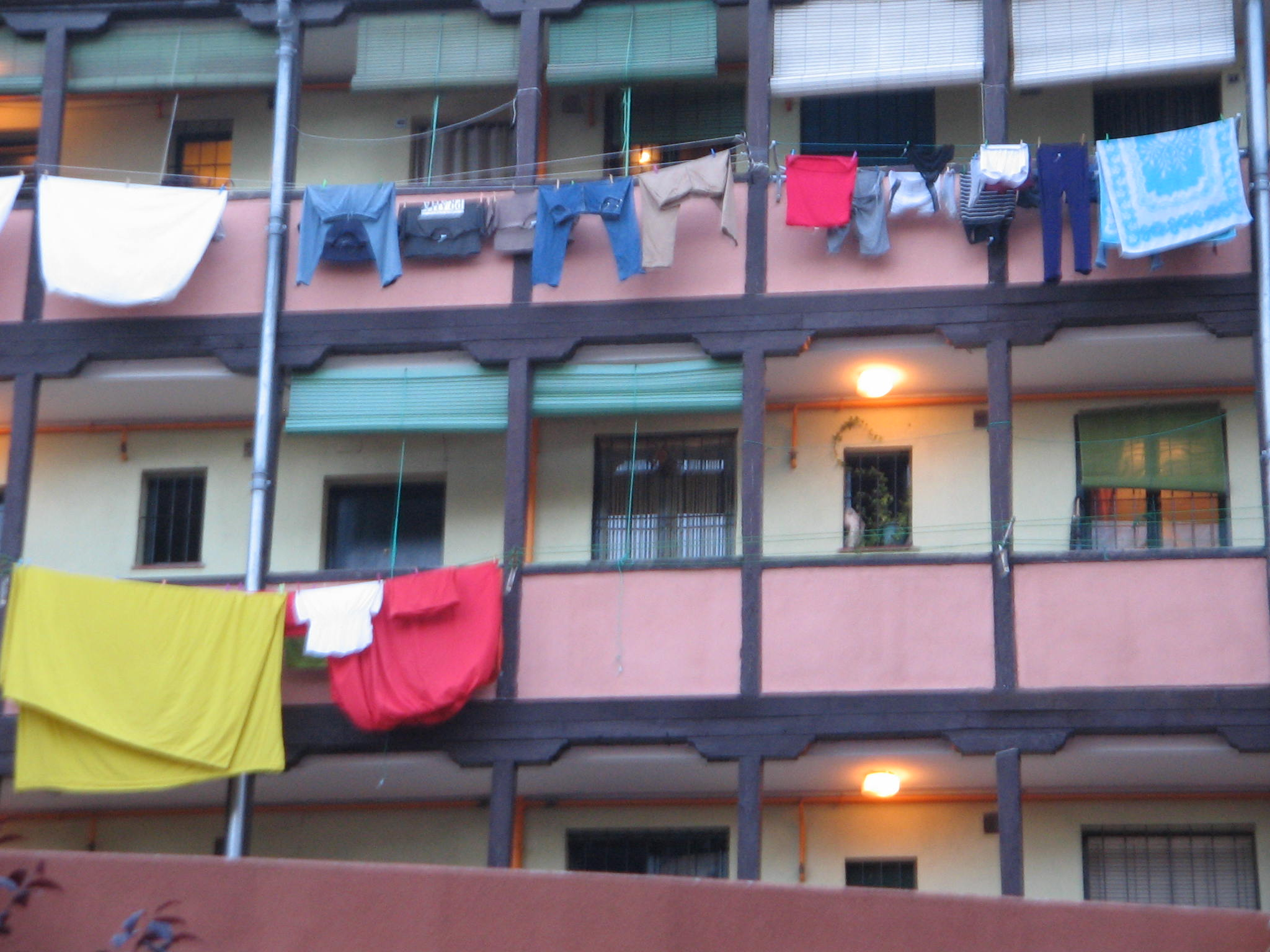
Corralas in Lavapiés, Madrid.

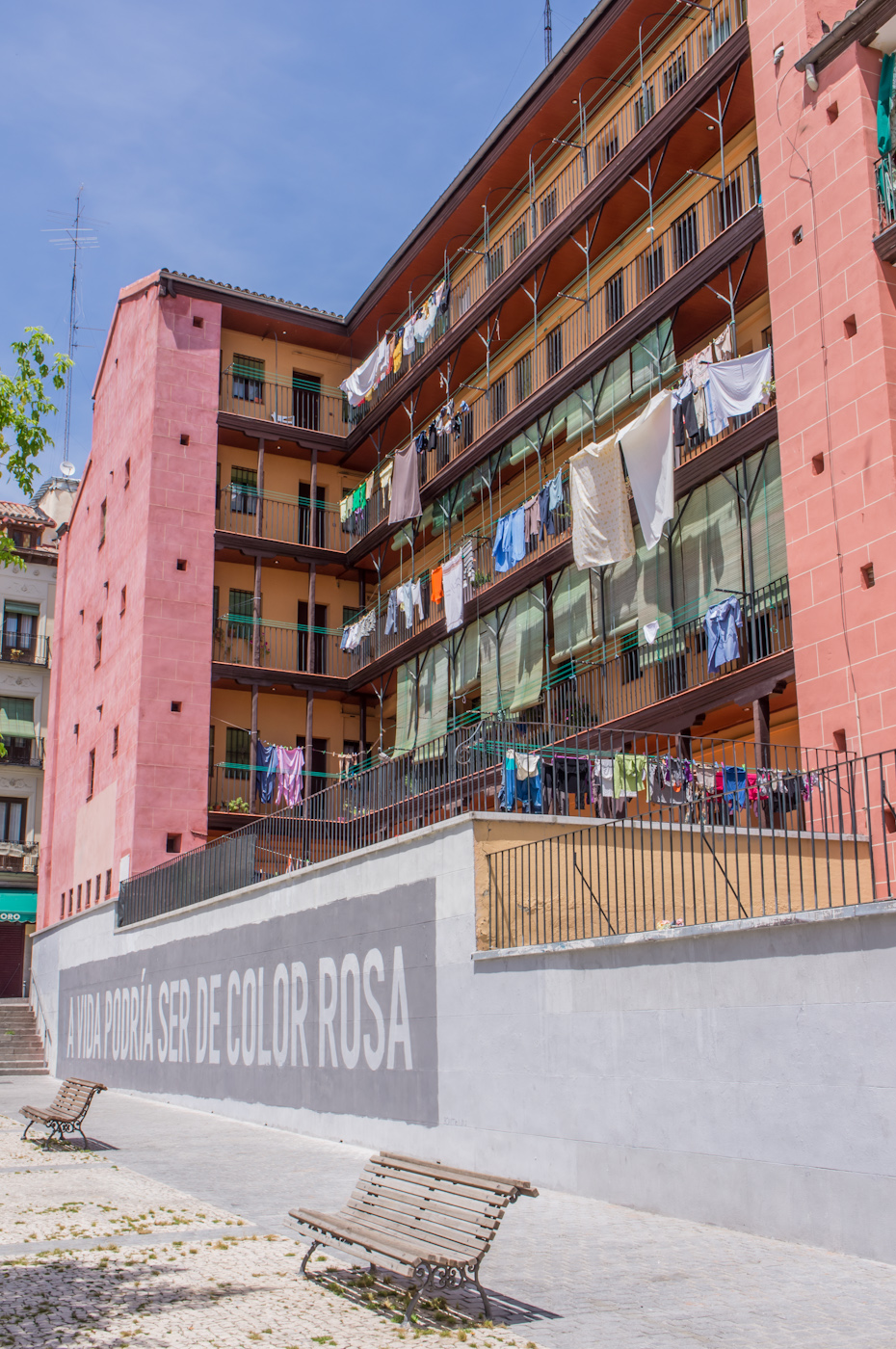
A motto displaying ''Life could be pink'' in a corral.

A corrala is a type of housing found in old Madrid. Sometimes, it may be called a corridor house due to blocks having doors located on corridors. Usually, it is wooden and the units look at the central area, or a patio.

Most are found in dense and traditional neighborhoods and were built during the 17th, 18th, and 19th centuries.

Some of the blocks are even mentioned in books, like Fortunata y Jacinta. Other blocks can also be found in other Spanish cities, like Cádiz, Granada, Málaga, Seville, Valencia, Valladolid, etc. More cities include Vitoria and Santander and in various towns in Castilla y León and Castilla-La Mancha.

In South America, similar blocks are called Conventillos. Such examples include Santiago de Chile, Valparaíso, Buenos Aires, and Montevideo.

== See also ==
- Casa di ringhiera, a similar type of building common in Northern Italy.
- Multi-family residential
