= Lavapiés =

Neighborhood in Madrid, Spain

Coordinates: 40°24.51′N 3°42.06′W

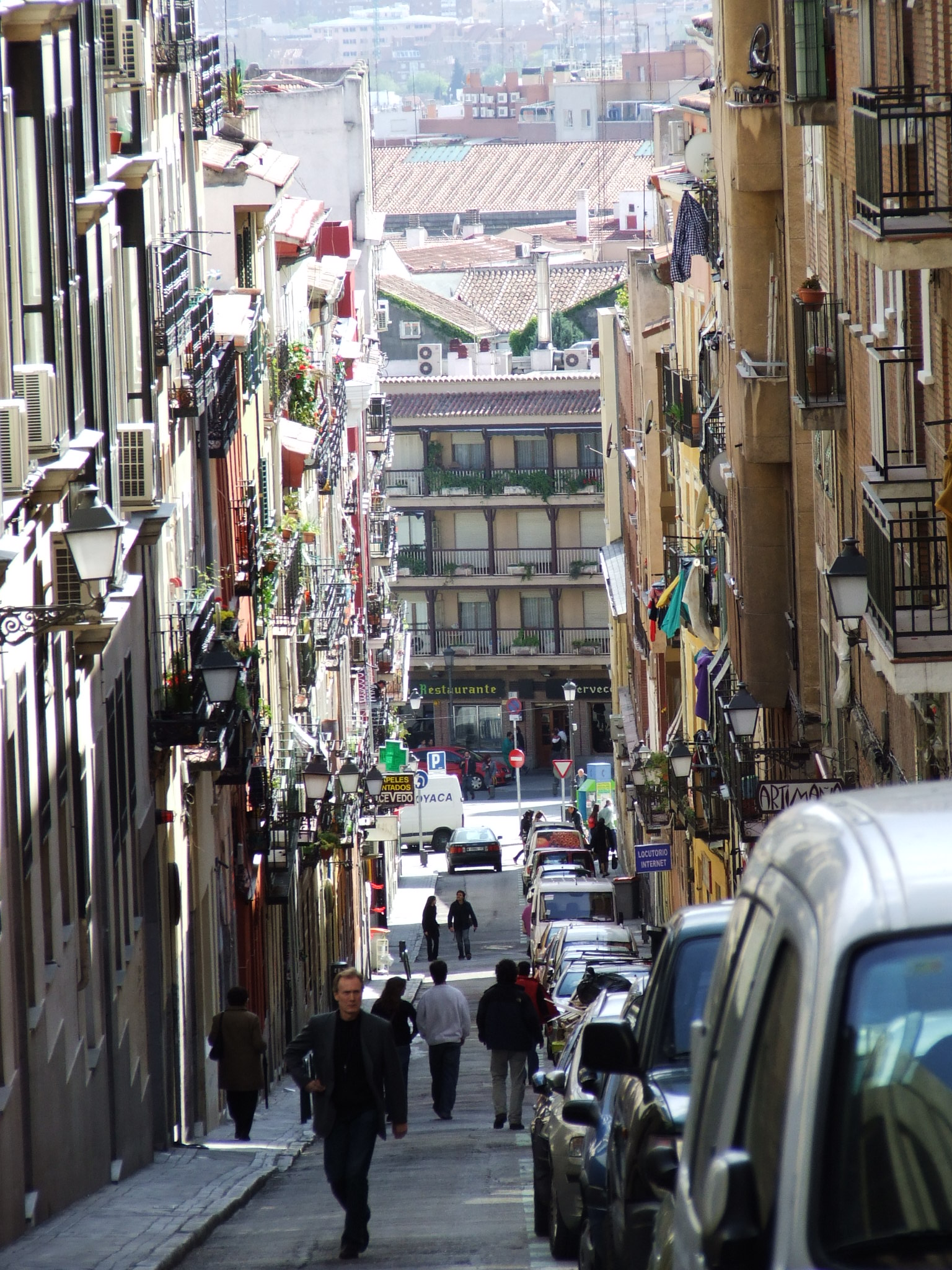
Zurita street, Lavapiés

Lavapiés ([ˌlaβaˈpjes]) is a historic neighbourhood in the city of Madrid, Spain. It is located in the administrative ward (barrio) of Embajadores in the downtown Centro District, southeast of neighbouring neighbourhood La Latina.

The name literally means "wash feet", possibly in reference to the fountain in Plaza de Lavapiés which no longer exists.

== Location ==
The neighborhood is centered on the Plaza de Lavapiés.

The boundaries of the Lavapiés neighborhood are Calle Magdalena and Calle Duque de Alba to the north, Calle Embajadores to the southwest, Calle Sebastián Elcano and Paseo Santa María de la Cabeza to the southeast, and Calle Atocha to the northeast.

== Overview ==
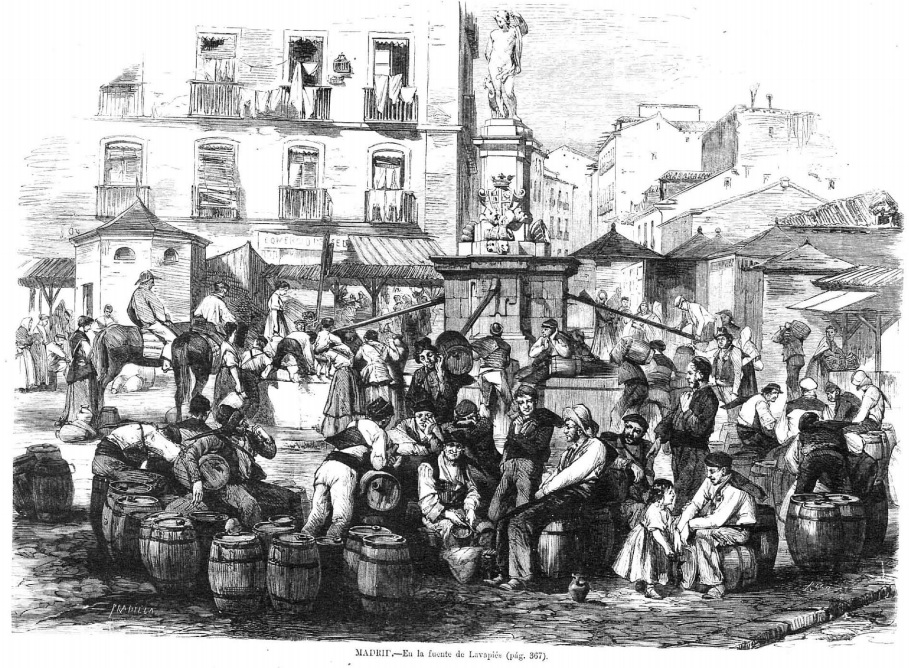
Fountain of Lavapiés, as featured in La Ilustración Española y Americana (1872).

Lavapiés was long considered the most "typical" neighborhood of Madrid; humble and somewhat neglected. Now its large immigrant population has given it a diverse and cosmopolitan flavor and it draws many visitors from other parts of Madrid, as well as foreign tourists. An inscription on a fountain in Plaza de Cabestreros is a monument to the Spanish Republic in Madrid. The ruins of Escuelas Pías, a religious school, were left to stand for many years after it was burned down by the anti-Catholic, radical left that supported the Popular Front in 1936. Only in 2002 were part of the ruins converted into a university library. The north side of the ruins face the Plaza Augustin Lara, named after the 20th century Mexican composer who wrote a song about Madrid which includes the phrase "I'll make you the empress of Lavapiés".

In the late 1980s and 1990s, Lavapiés had acquired a reputation as a "vertical slum", with its tenement blocks either empty or occupied by older people paying low rents. As a result, it became the most important location for okupación, or squatting, in Madrid.

More recently, it has become the focal point for immigrant populations, most notably from the Indian subcontinent, Chinese, Arabs and Senegalese. It has been estimated that around 60% of the population is of foreign origin and that there are 82 different nationalities represented.

West of Calle Ave María has a very high percentage of immigrant residents and shops and restaurants are almost exclusively owned by Chinese, Indians, Bangladeshis, Maghrebis and Middle Easterners. East of Calle Ave María, while still maintaining a socialist atmosphere relative to the other areas of Madrid, has a far higher native Spanish population and culinary/night scene.

There is a consistent police presence in Plaza de Lavapiés, as well as a high level of open drug dealing. Aside from the police, the area is relatively safe in the south and east end. Surveillance cameras are present throughout the neighborhood.

The architecture of Lavapiés, much like other barrios of Madrid (including Malasaña, La Latina and Chueca) is rather uniform with similar height, windows, balconies, pastel colours and shop/apartment set up. However, Lavapiés is unique in that there are steep hills creating a dramatic effect on some streets as well as tall trees unique to the centre of Madrid.

At the end of the 1990s, a programme of urban renewal was begun, in the hope of bringing in more prosperous residents attracted to its Bohemian atmosphere. The resulting sharp increase in rents has driven out much of its previous population.

The Lavapiés metro station on Line 3 of the Madrid Metro is nearby.

== Ambiance ==
The area has evolved from almost projecting a level of high impoverishment to a more multicultural entity within Madrid's metropolitan area. Much of this attitude or culture can be seen in the graffiti that is often on display in the walls. Much of it speaks of an attitude that can be traced to an era in which many of its citizens portrayed an anti-Franco sentiment; however, some writings are more artistic in nature. Furthermore, many graffiti artists in the area are talented, politically minded leftists and anarchists. Street art is a visible reminder of the neighborhood's history and present as an often revolutionary and anti-capitalist tendency.

The atmosphere of the nightlife of Lavapiés can be divided into three parts. South of the plaza are several bars and cafés with a bohemian vibe and many terraces during the summer.

On Calle Ave María and east of it are many alternative bars, not to mention fringe meetings (parties or artistic/musical meetings) that also happen in abandoned or unlicensed premises. There are also several shisha bars and a café selling the Madrid-renowned Zapatilla, a 1kg sandwich made with ham and cheese.

== Gallery ==
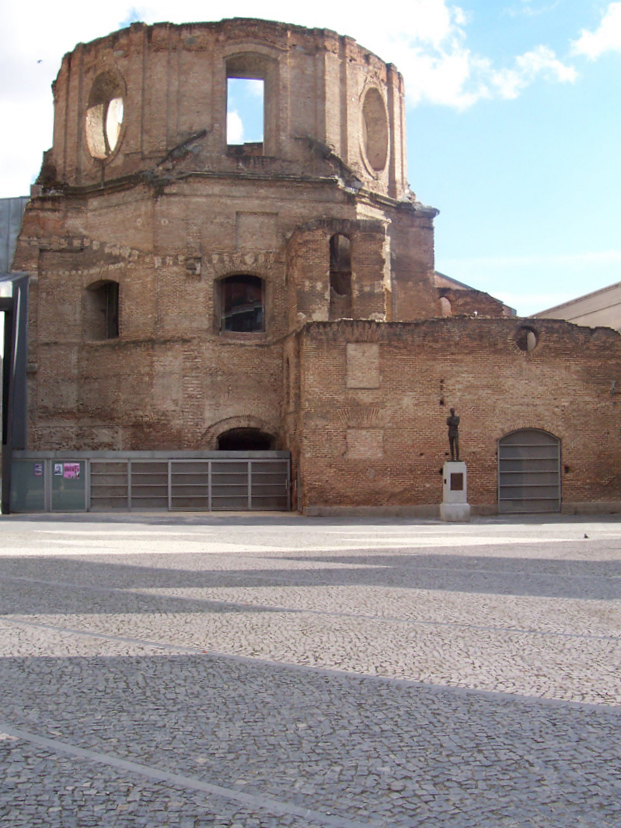
San Fernando church

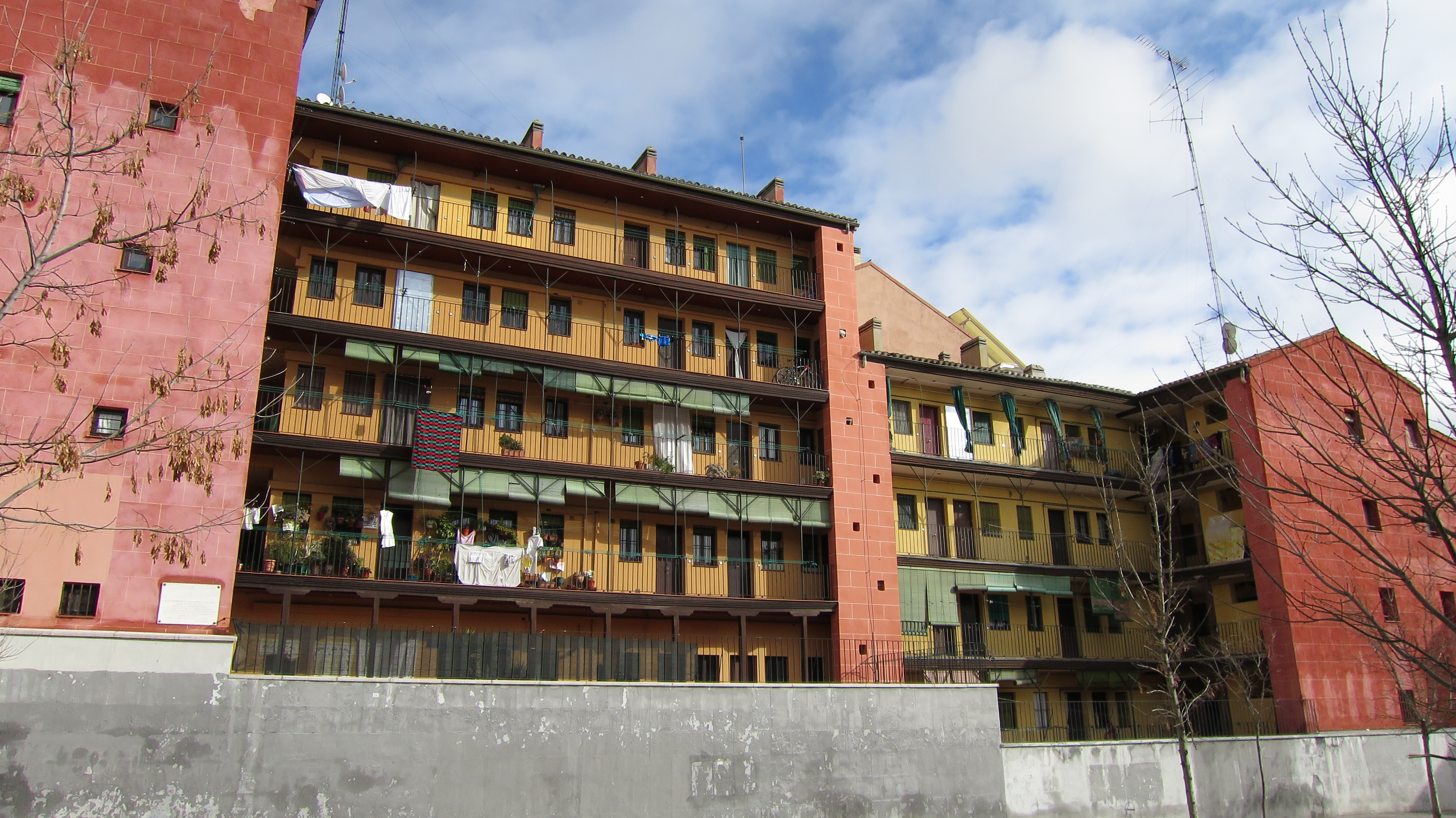
Traditional corrala

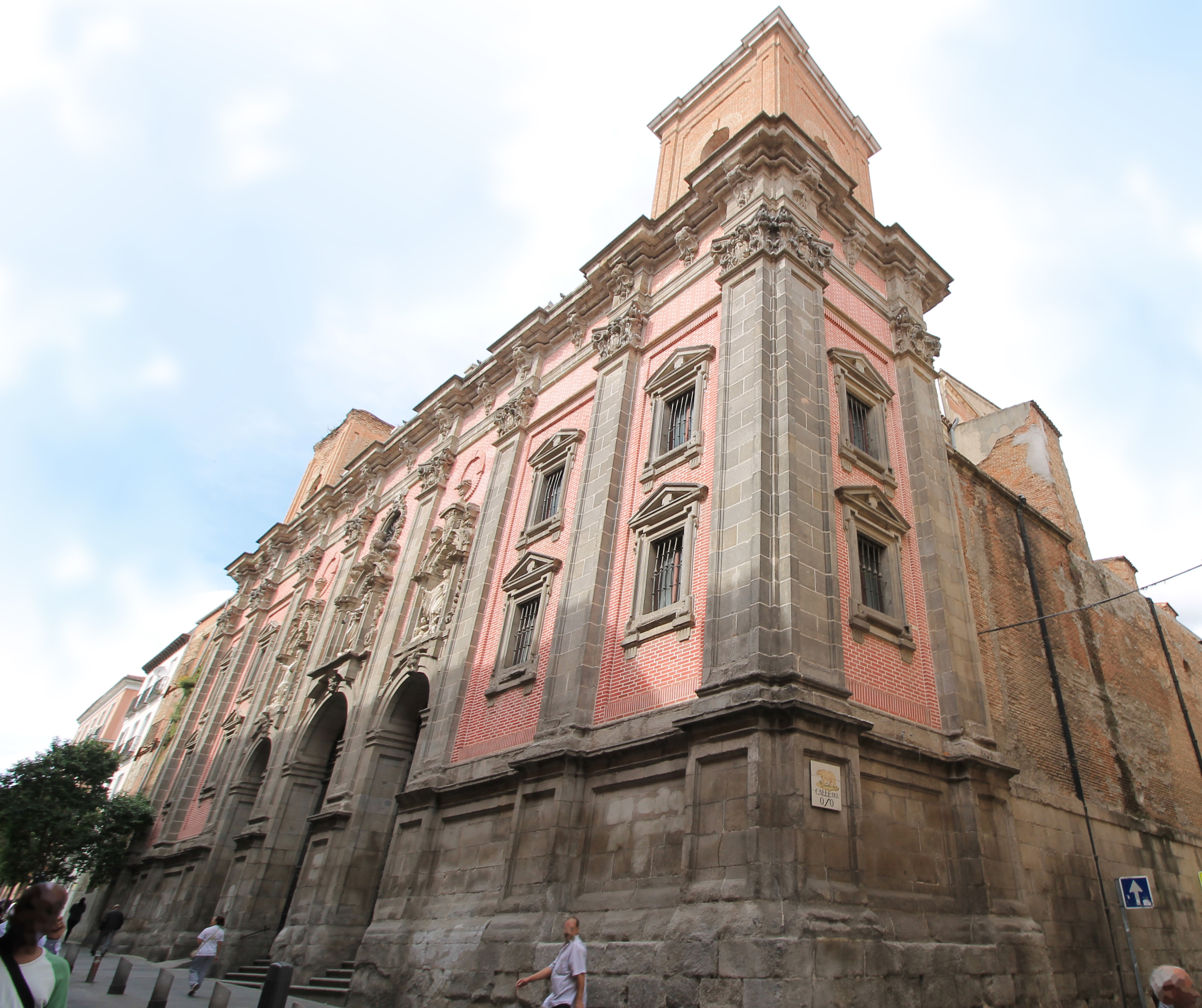
San Cayetano Church

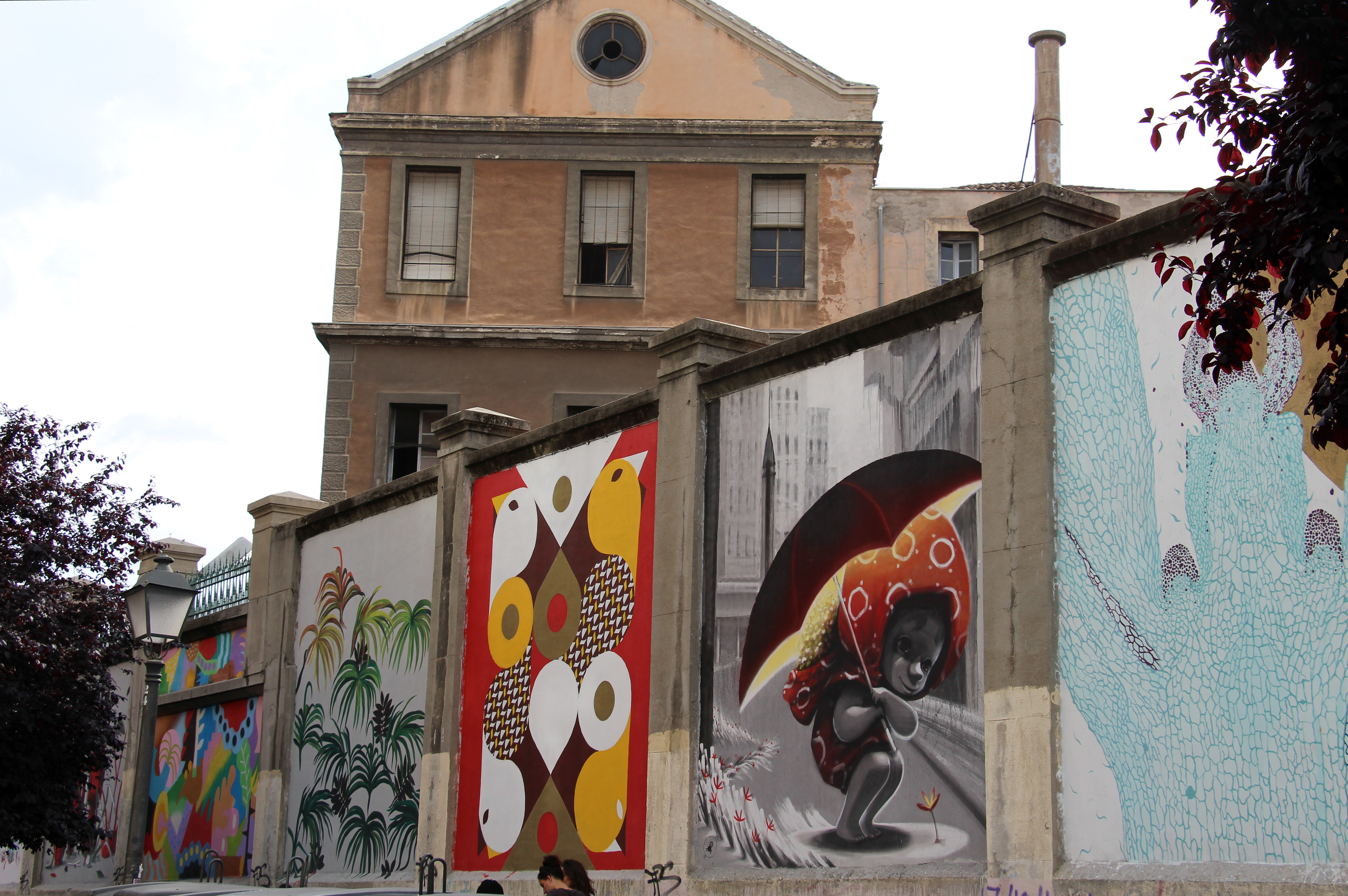
Old Tobacco Warehouse

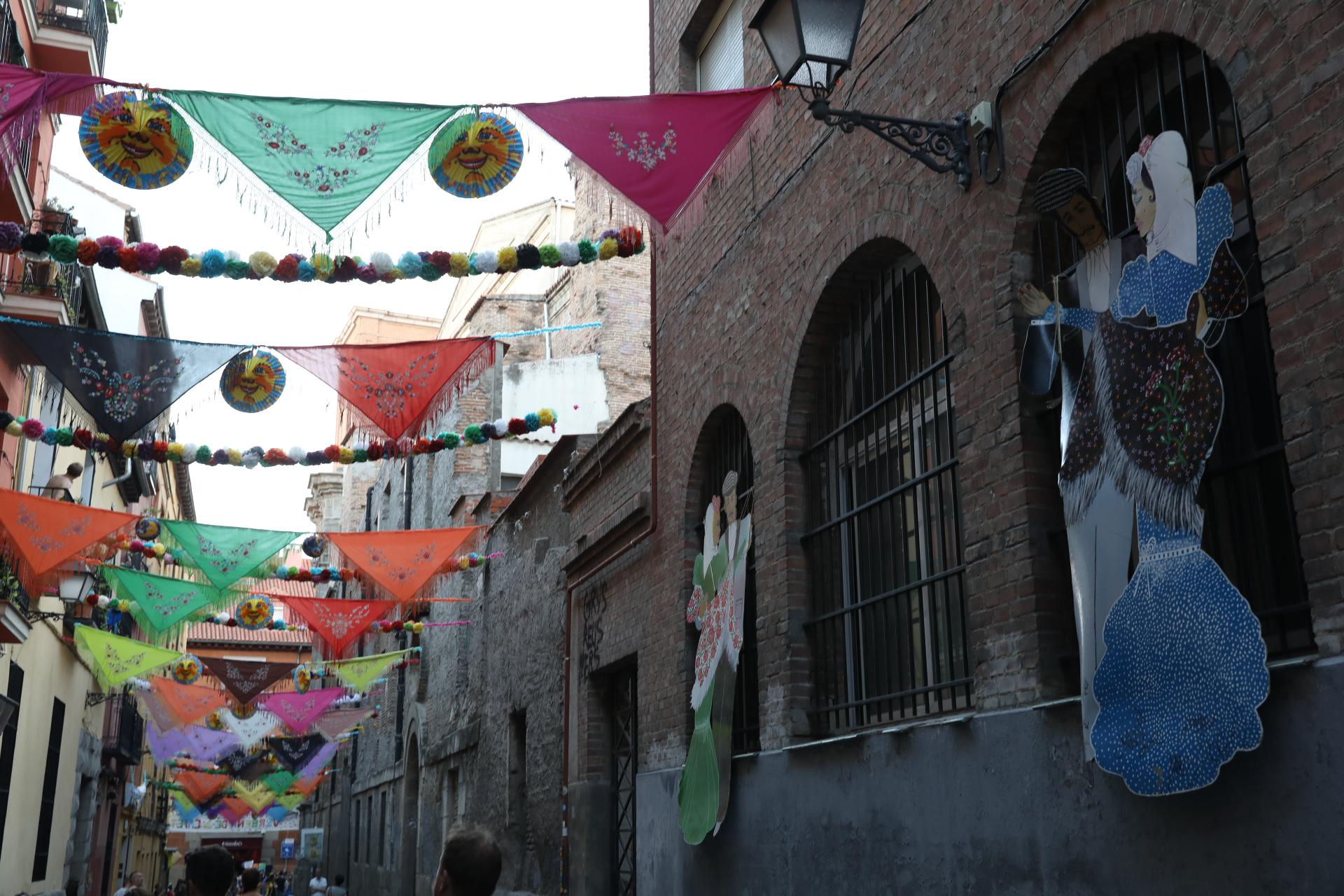
Lavapiés during traditional fiestas

== See also ==
- Embajadores
- Corral (housing)
- Barrio de La Latina (Madrid)
- Lavapiés (Madrid Metro)
