= Puente de Colores =

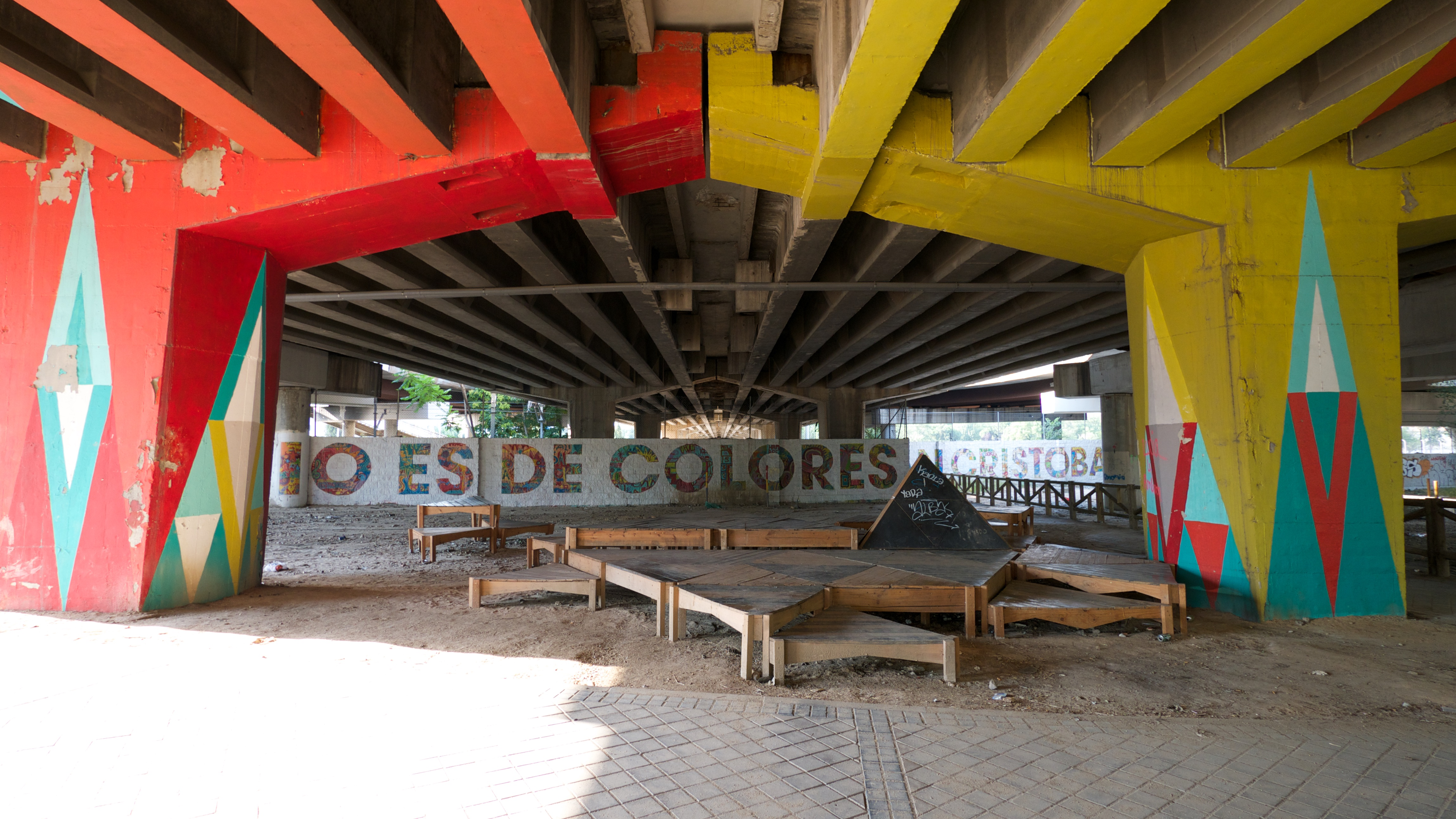
Puente de Colores playground

Puente de Colores is a landmark and open-air arts and culture social centre in the San Cristóbal de los Ángeles ward of Madrid, Spain, at the most prominent entryway to the neighborhood. The project to transform the undeveloped area beneath an Avenida de Andalucía overpass into a functional venue began in 2012 as collaborative effort between community-development project Autobarrios, architects, artists, and local residents. The plan was completed in 2014, though development continues. and Puente de Colores, hosts educational and cultural activities, including a TED event, and has a playground. Its name means 'Bridge of Colours' in Spanish.

== History ==
After consulting and planning with the local community in 2012, Autobarrios, which initially organized to take on this project, began the first phase of construction by painting the surrounding walls, underpass ceiling, and piers of the bridge in 2013. International art collective Boa Mistura collaborated with Autobarrios, architect Sara Fernandez Deutsch, and members of the local community on the painting project. The Department of Conservation and Renewal of Public Roads of the City of Madrid leveled the flooring and added gravel. Additional support has been provided by the Montemadrid Foundation.

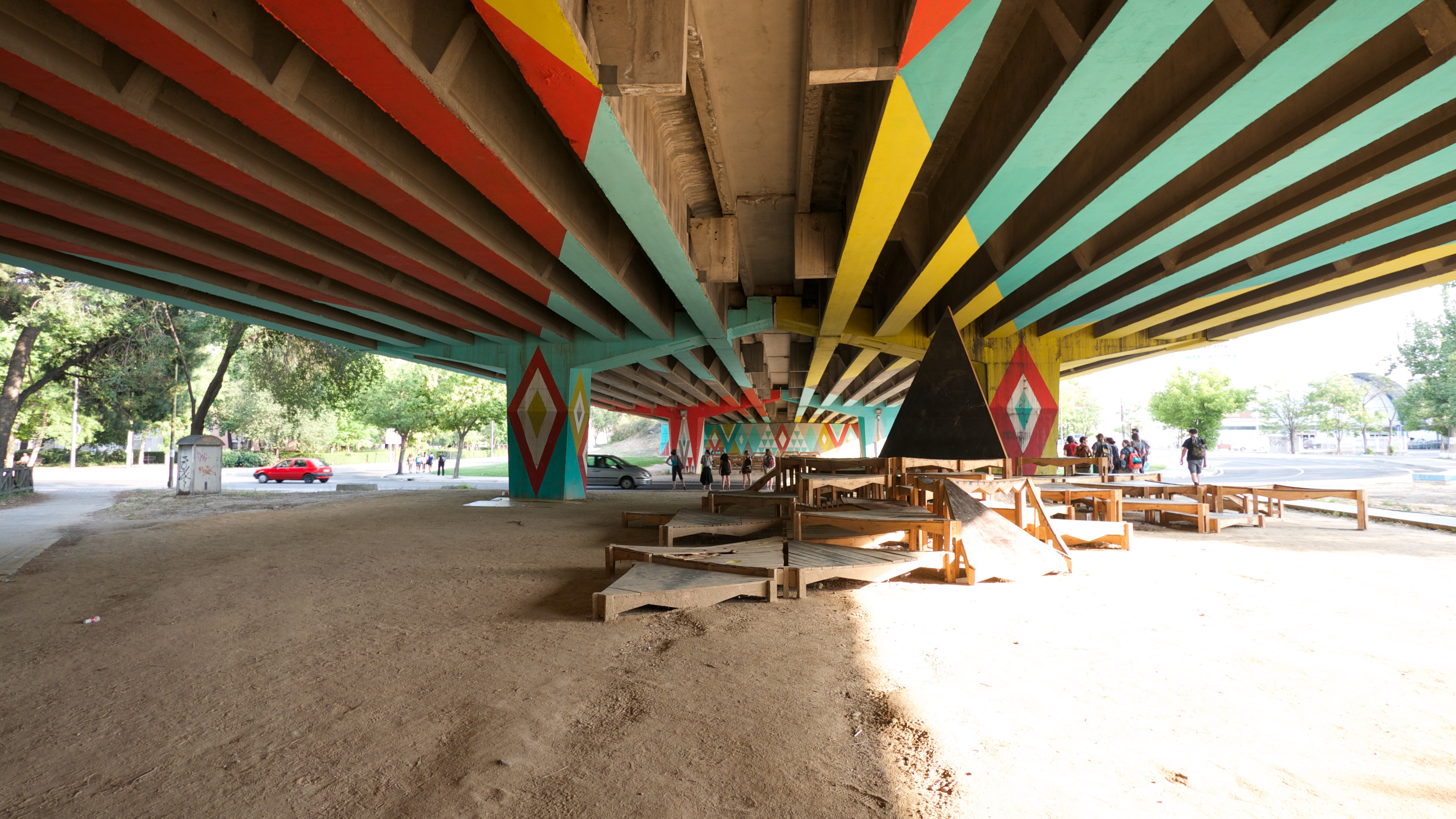
Puente de Colores Stage

After the completion of the painting and leveling, Collectif Etc, a French architecture collective, collaborated with the Institut Français branch in Madrid, and others including multinational auto manufacturer Renault, to design and construct multipurpose furniture that primarily serves as a stage and playground, using excess materials donated by Matadero Madrid and Acciona. In all, some 500 people participated in the three-phase project. The grand opening included activities for children, dance, a chess tournament, and rock and rap music performances.

In 2014 Renault and Matadero Madrid collaborated with the community to build a walkway through the space, using materials donated by Acciona and the local bibliobus (bookmobile) program.

Neighborhood students enrolled in a cultural management course, El Curso de Gestión Cultural, manage the space as an arts and cultural events venue. In July 2014, Puente de Colores hosted community theatre workshops and a film night.

In March 2015, Puente de Colores hosted a health, wellness and community fair, Acción Global Ciudadana del proyecto de Intervención Comunitaria Intercultural. TEDx Madrid Salon selected Puente de Colores as the site of a special outdoor, night program entitled "Informal Learning", on 14 July 2015. Autobarrios is working with El Curso de Gestión Cultural to continually improve the space and expand offerings at the venue. As of 2015, the focus is on establishing electrical connections, WiFi, signage, security, and maintenance. An article in the arts and culture journal Yorokobu reports that participation in building the venue has empowered local youth, in a neighborhood characterized by social problems like low incoming, high unemployment, and poor school attendance.
