= Casa di ringhiera =

Italian style of apartment block with shared balconies

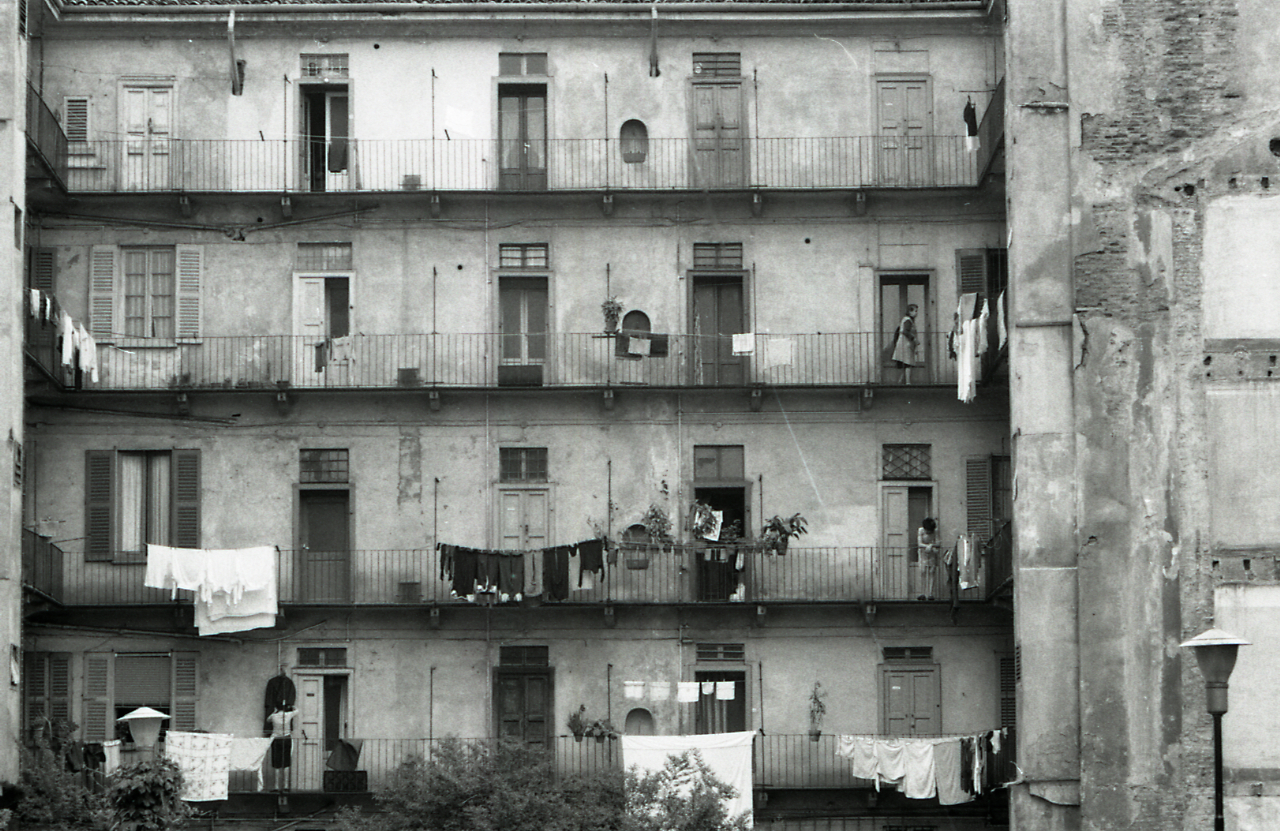
A casa di ringhiera in a picture by Paolo Monti (Milan, 1970)

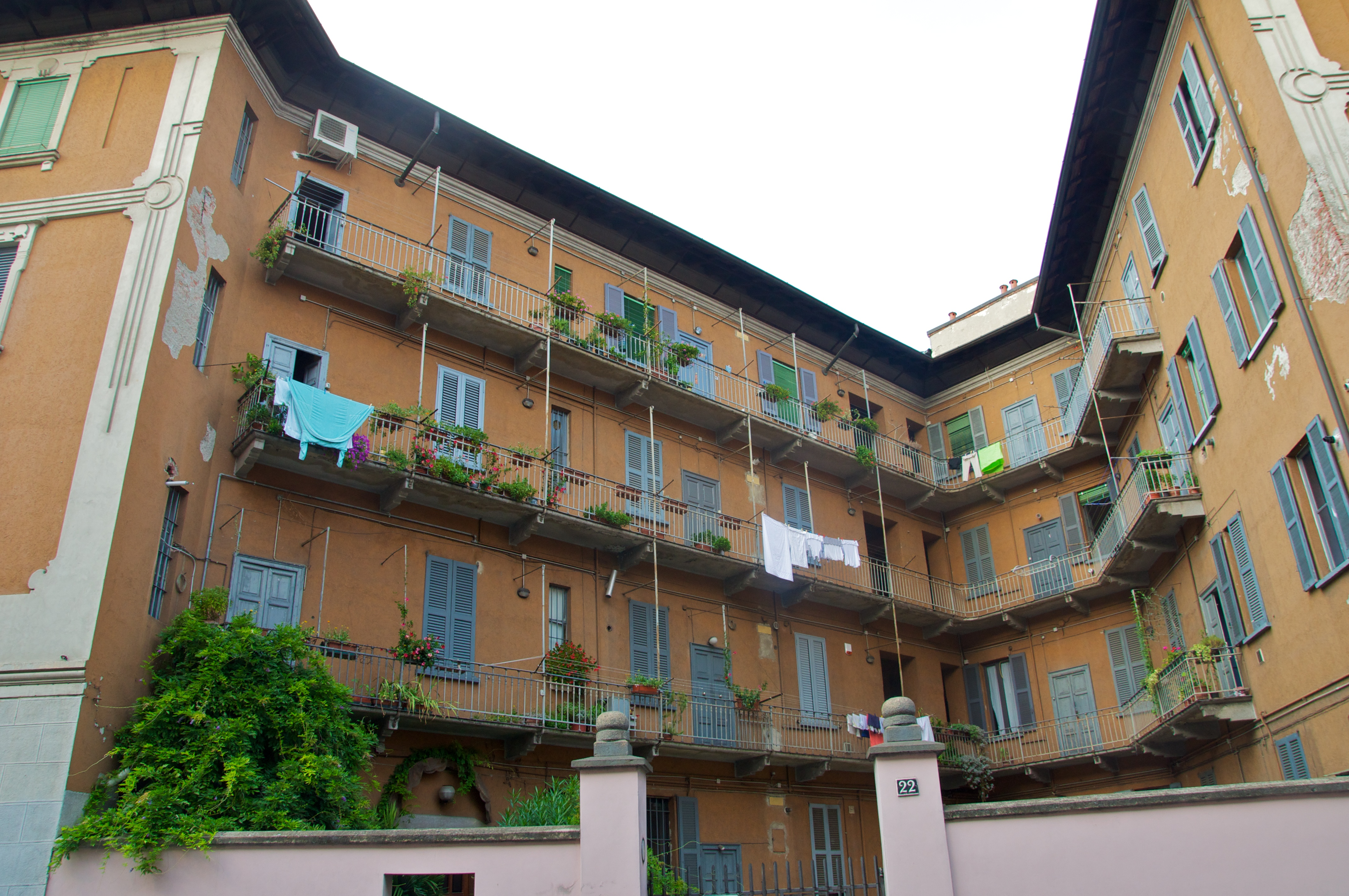
Case di Ringhiera

The casa di ringhiera (Italian pl. case di ringhiera, literally "guard rail houses") is a type of popular housing characterized by several flats sharing the same open gallery on each floor. Such galleries run the whole length of the building, provide access to the individual housing units and face an inner courtyard, which, in some buildings, provided the only access to the toilets. In most cases, however, the toilets were at the end of the gallery and were shared by the inhabitants of a single floor. The vast majority of such buildings has been renovated, with bathrooms created inside the flats.

Tenants of Casa di ringhiera are able to see most of their neighbors from their flats, and the buildings are known for their communal living.

Case di ringhiera typically have three floors (but can have up to six) over a ground floor intended for commercial use. Typically, they have no balconies on the outer side of the building, which, together with their colour (they were traditionally painted a dark yellow, which many of them still retain) made them stand out among buildings of the same age. They were chiefly built around the turn of the 20th century in large towns in Northwestern Italy; however, convents, farmhouses and other structures were built according to the same model at least as early as the 16th century; in spite of the relatively limited period and area in which they were built, and of successive demolitions, case di ringhiera are still numerous today, with 70,000 (about 11% of the total) such living units in Milan alone.

== See also ==
- Chawl a very similar type of housing built in the same period, and for the same purposes, in Western India, especially in the city of Mumbai.
- Corrala, casa de corredor, or edificación de vecindad, a similar structure typical of Madrid, but also found in some other towns in Castile, as well as in parts of Andalusia and some other cities in Spain.
