= Madrid Planetarium =

Museum in Madrid, Spain

Coordinates: 40.3926°N 3.6852°W

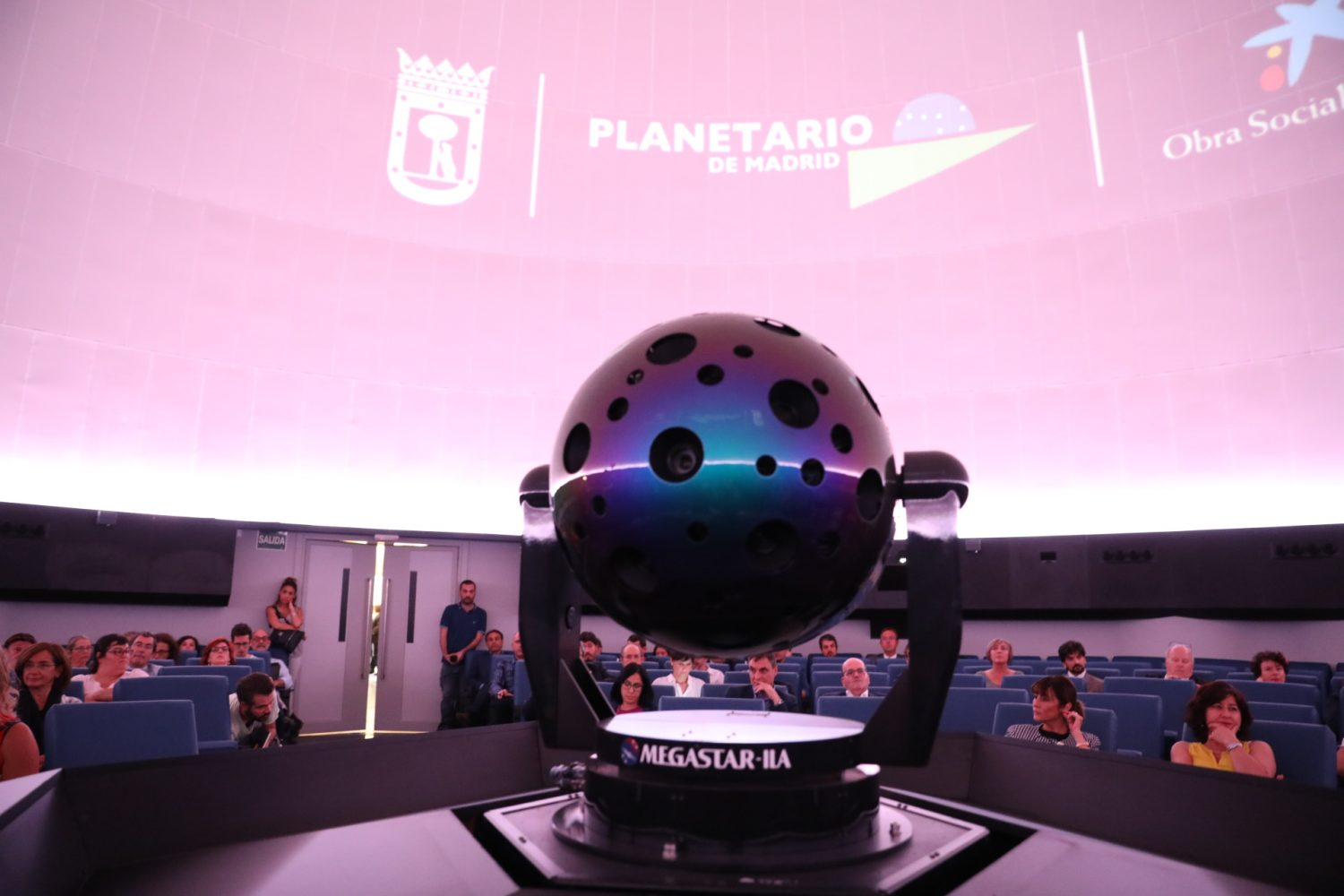

The Madrid Planetarium (Spanish: Planetario de Madrid) is a facility in Madrid, Spain, which was inaugurated in 1986. The equipment was updated in 2016/2017.

With its free exhibitions and interactive displays, the Planetarium promotes science among the younger generations. Outside there is access to the Tierno Galvan Park, where children can play in an open auditorium.
