= Los Ángeles (Madrid) =

Coordinates: 40°21′24″N 3°41′57″W

- Ward of Madrid
- Interactive map of Los Ángeles
- Country: Spain
- Aut. community: Community of Madrid
- Municipality: Madrid
- District: Villaverde

Los Ángeles is a ward (barrio) of Spain's capital Madrid. The ward belongs to the district of Villaverde.
