= San Cristóbal (Madrid) =

Neighbourhood of southern Madrid, Spain

Coordinates: 40°20′36″N 3°41′19″W

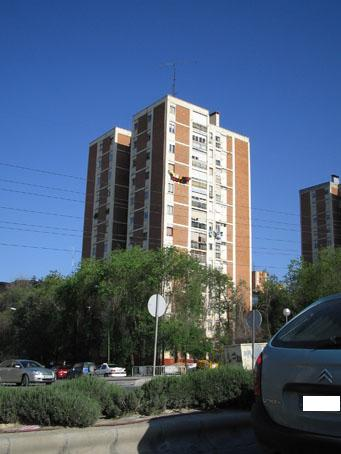
San Cristóbal, as seen from the nearby Avenida de Andalucía

San Cristóbal ([ˈsaŋ kɾisˈtoβal], "Saint Christopher") is a neighbourhood in southern Madrid, the capital city of Spain.

The neighbourhood is isolated by the railroads and highways that create borders, but it has a Madrid Metro stop on Line 3 at San Cristóbal station.

San Cristóbal is home to the Puente de Colores open-air social centre, built from 2012–2014 and a community urban renewal project. Raúl, the Real Madrid legend, was born in this neighbourhood.

== Notable residents ==
- Raúl (born 1977), footballer
