= Villaverde (Madrid) =

Coordinates: 40.445945°N 3.701143°W

- District of Madrid
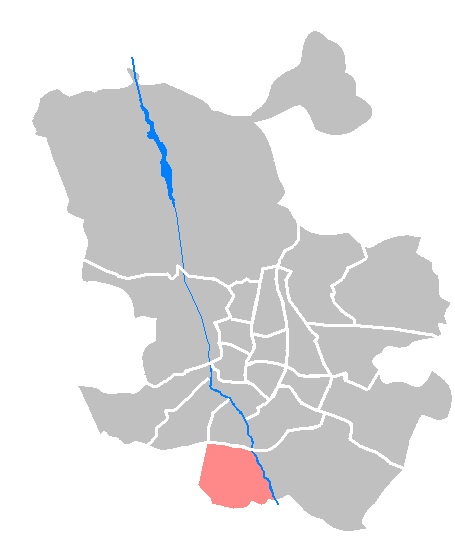
- Country: Spain
- Auton. community: Madrid
- Municipality: Madrid

Government
  - Councillor-President: Orlando Chacón Tabares (PP, 2023)

Area
  - Total: 20.29 km^{2} (7.83 sq mi)

Population
  - Total: 126,802
  - Density: 6,249/km^{2} (16,180/sq mi)
- Postal code: 28032
- Madrid district number: 17

Villaverde (Spanish pronunciation: [biʎaˈβeɾðe]) is one of the 21 districts of the city of Madrid, Spain.

== Geography and history ==
The municipality was absorbed by Madrid in the 1950s as a result of the plans that the Franco government made to simplify the structure of big city administrations. Since then, it is a district. It was in those years when it experienced a massive growth caused by the rural flight in Spain. This is the reason that made Villaverde a typical working class neighbourhood.

This condition leaves a heavy footprint in the district, because it has conditioned the current population composition, with many retired people (some of them returning to their towns in Andalusia, Castile-León, ...) and immigrants attracted by the cheap housing prices.

The district is administratively divided into five wards (barrios):

- Butarque
- Los Ángeles
- Los Rosales
- San Cristóbal de los Ángeles
- Villaverde Alto
