= El Casar (Madrid Metro) =

Madrid Metro station

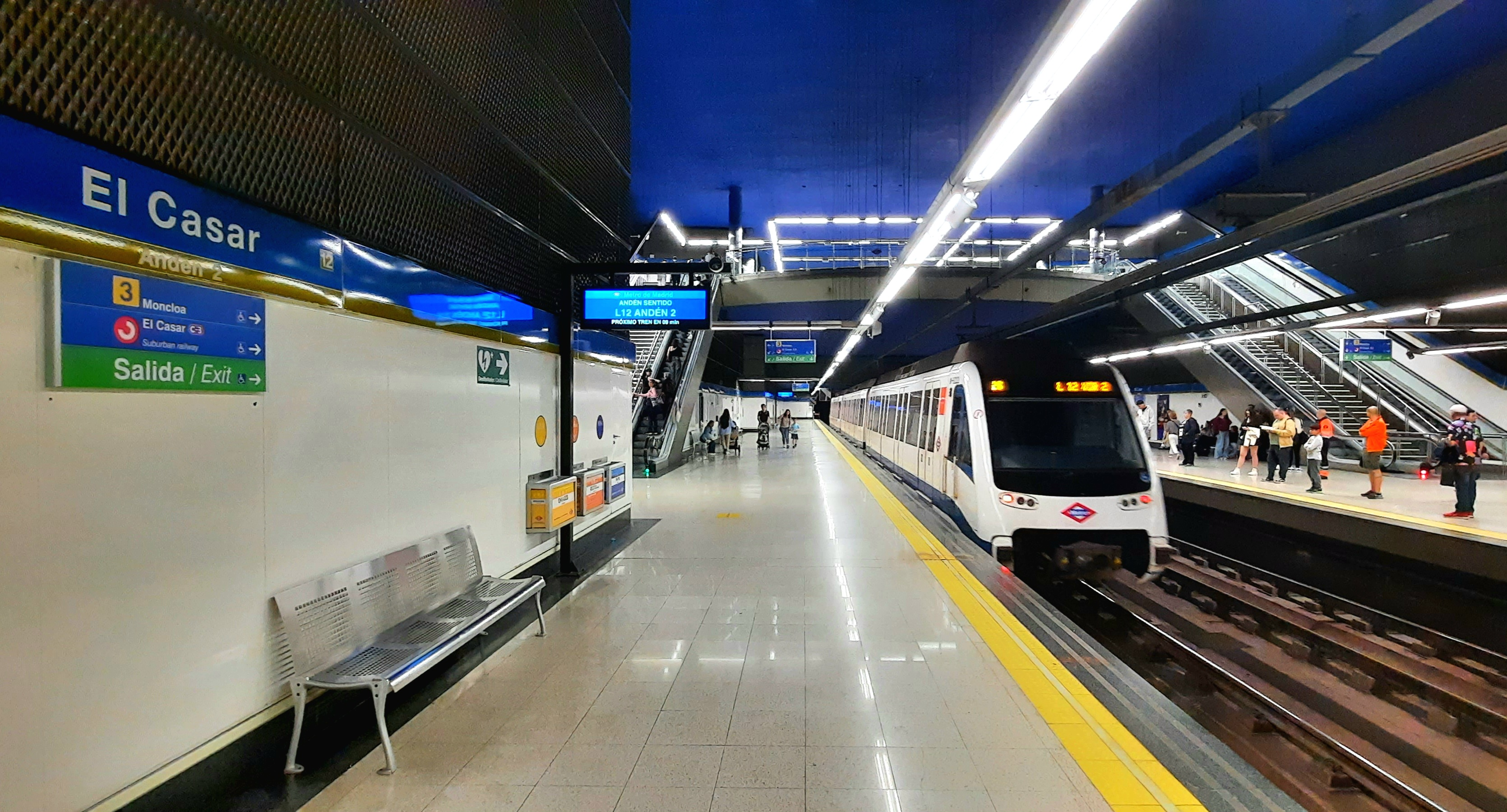

General information
- Location: Getafe, Community of Madrid; Spain
- Coordinates: 40.3184662°N 3.7098354°W
- System: Madrid Metro station
- Owner: CRTM
- Operator: CRTM

Construction
- Accessible: yes

Other information
- Fare zone: B1

History
- Opened: 11 April 2003; 23 years ago

Services
Preceding station	Madrid Metro	Following station
Terminus	Line 3	Villaverde Alto towards Moncloa
Juan de la Cierva clockwise / outer	Line 12	Los Espartales anticlockwise / inner
Preceding station	Cercanías Madrid	Following station
Out of system interchange
Getafe Industrial towards Chamartín	C-3	San Cristobal Industrial towards Aranjuez
Location
- Location within Madrid

El Casar [el kaˈsaɾ] is a station on Line 3 and Line 12 of the Madrid Metro, serving the El Casar barrio of Getafe. It is located in fare Zone B1. The station offers connection to Cercanías Madrid via El Casar railway station.
