= Moncloa (Madrid Metro) =

Madrid Metro station

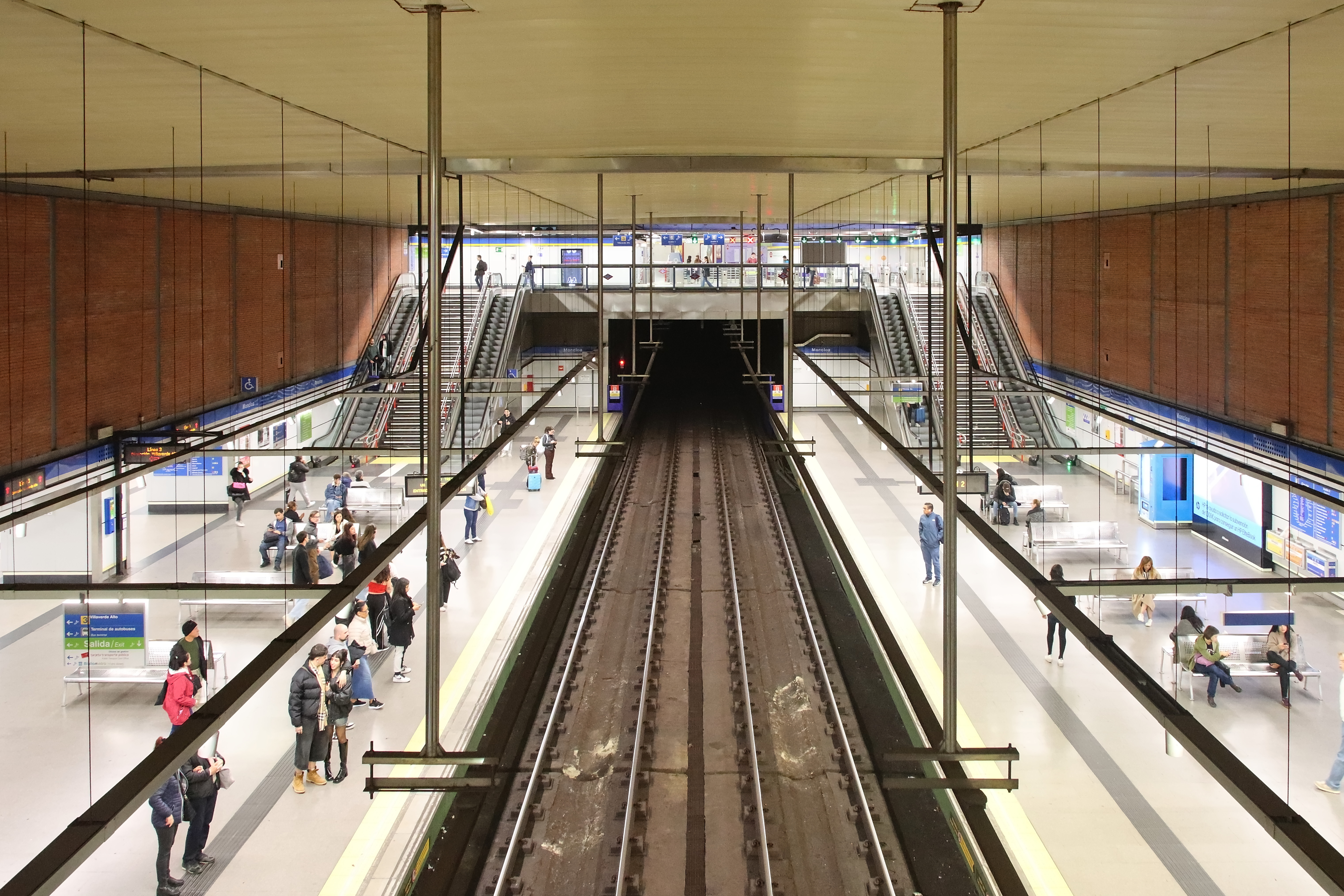
- Line 6 platforms at Moncloa

General information
- Location: Chamberí / Moncloa-Aravaca, Madrid; Spain
- Coordinates: 40.4353828°N 3.7191483°W
- System: Madrid Metro station
- Owner: CRTM
- Operator: CRTM

Construction
- Structure type: Underground
- Accessible: Yes

Other information
- Fare zone: A

History
- Opened: 17 July 1963; 63 years ago

Services
Preceding station	Madrid Metro	Following station
Argüelles towards El Casar	Line 3	Terminus
Ciudad Universitaria clockwise / outer	Line 6	Argüelles anticlockwise / inner
Location
- Location within Madrid

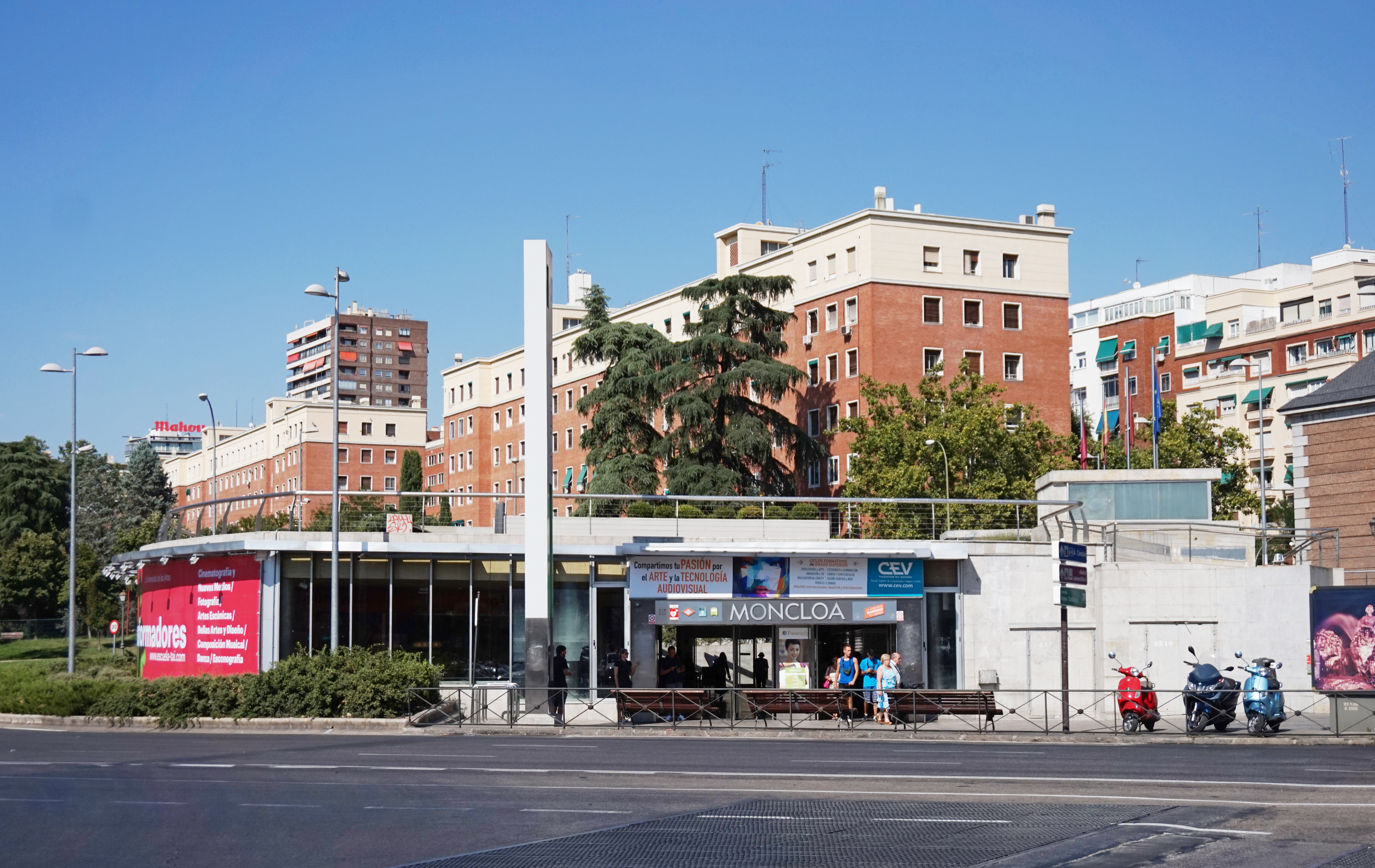
Moncloa station headhouse

Moncloa [moŋˈkloa] is a multimodal station in Madrid, Spain that serves Madrid Metro Line 3 and Line 6, as well as city buses and intercity and long-distance coaches. It is located underneath the Plaza De Moncloa and Calle de la Princesa near Arco de la Victoria and the headquarters of the Spanish Air and Space Force in fare Zone A.

== History ==
The station was inaugurated on 17 July 1963 when Line 3 was extended from Argüelles. The station featured 90-metre (300 ft) platforms, in contrast with the 60-metre (200 ft) found in the rest of the line. Because of this, it was the only station on Line 3 that was not renovated in 2006. The station had two entrances, one on Isaac Peral street, and the other on Fernández de los Ríos street, both of which are closed today.

The Line 6 platforms were inaugurated on 10 May 1995 when the segment between Laguna and Ciudad Universitaria was opened, converting Line 6 into a circular route. The Line 6 platforms are deeper than the Line 3 platforms, and a new corridor was built to connect them, as well as a new entrance on Princesa street in front of the Junta Municipal de Distrito (district city offices).

The first underground bus terminal was inaugurated later that year, and it served intercity buses to towns along the A-6 motorway corridor. It had 14 bays and about 30 lines. The terminal had two additional entrances, one the corner of Paseo Moret and Princesa street and another on Princesa street in front of the Air Force headquarters. However, the number of intercity buses serving the station increased over the years, and by 2004 some buses had to stop on the street above the station due to a lack of space.

In order to address this issue, a new deeper set of Line 3 platforms was constructed between 2004 and 2006, and in 2008 a new bus terminal was opened in the space formerly occupied by the old Line 3 platforms. The new Line 3 platforms were built parallel to the Line 6 platforms to facilitate transfers. The Line 3 platform work affected the entire line, which had to be shut down for three consecutive summers between 2004 and 2006. On 30 September 2006, the new platforms were opened. As part of the renovation, a new entrance was built on Arcipreste de Hita street and a new access was provided to the bus terminal, and the original entrances on Isaac Peral and Fernández de los Ríos streets were closed.

In the space left behind by the old Line 3 platforms, an expansion of the underground bus terminal was built, including an entrance in front of the Junta Municipal de Distrito. The new bus terminal opened on 19 February 2008, and seven bus lines were moved to the station. In February and March of that year, additional lines were moved into the new station. In 2008 and 2009, the bus lines in the old terminal were reorganized to make better use of space. Since 2008, the renewed bus terminal station allow more intercity buses to towns like Las Rozas, Collado Villalba, El Espinar and some others nearby towns on the Sierra de Guadarrama mountains and along the A-6 motorway.

On 12 January 2009, a 7000 series train on Line 6 derailed in the station, and from that point on AnsaldoBreda series trains were permanently banned from Line 6.

Between 28 June and 28 August 2014, the segment of Line 6 between Moncloa and Vicente Aleixandre (then known as Metropolitano) was closed for renovations, making Moncloa a temporary terminal station on Line 6.
