= Argentino =

Argentino is the Spanish word for "citizen of Argentina" or the adjective "Argentine".

It may also refer to:

== Geography ==
- Argentino, a seaside resort in Uruguay
- Lake Argentino, a lake in the Andes in Patagonia

== Sports ==
- Argentino de Quilmes, an Argentine association football club
- Argentino de Rosario, an Argentine association football club
- Club Argentino de Rugby, an Argentine rugby union club

== People ==
- Argentino del Valle Larrabure (1932–1975), Argentine military officer
- Argentino Luna (1941–2011), Argentine singer-songwriter
- Argentino Molinuevo (disambiguation)

== Other ==
- Argentine argentino, a former Argentine currency

== See also ==
- Argentina (disambiguation)
- Argentine (disambiguation)
- Argentin (surname)
