= Wheelerenomyia =

Wheelerenomyia Temporal range: Eocene, 37.2–33.9 Ma

Scientific classification
- Kingdom: Animalia
- Phylum: Arthropoda
- Class: Insecta
- Order: Diptera
- Family: Dolichopodidae
- Subfamily: Sciapodinae
- Genus: †Wheelerenomyia; Meunier, 1907

Type species
- †Wheelerenomyia eocenica Meunier, 1907

Extinct genus of flies

Wheelerenomyia is an extinct genus of flies in the family Dolichopodidae that lived during the Eocene of the Baltic region. The genus currently contains 13 species, all of which were described from Baltic amber. Within the family Dolichopodidae, Wheelerenomyia is considered to be a member of the subfamily Sciapodinae, but its wing vein M is unbranched and strongly curved so it is considered closely related to members of the tribe Mesorhagini. The genus was first described in 1907 by Fernand Meunier, who named it after William Morton Wheeler.

== Species ==
The genus contains 13 species. Originally it had only one species, W. eocenica; in 2008, Igor Grichanov moved 14 extinct species from other sciapodine genera (Amesorhaga, Nematoproctus, Psilopus – now Sciapus – and Neurigona) to the genus. In 2024, a new species, W. negrobovi, was described, while three others were synonymized.

- †Wheelerenomyia bickeli (Negrobov & Selivanova, 2003)
- †Wheelerenomyia corcula (Meunier, 1907)
- †Wheelerenomyia eocenica Meunier, 1907 (synonym: Wheelerenomyia subparva (Meunier, 1916))
- †Wheelerenomyia longicerca (Negrobov & Selivanova, 2003)
- †Wheelerenomyia negrobovi Grichanov, 2024
- †Wheelerenomyia originaria (Meunier, 1907) (synonym: Wheelerenomyia quadrispinosa (Negrobov & Selivanova, 2003))
- †Wheelerenomyia pacata (Meunier, 1907)
- †Wheelerenomyia parca (Meunier, 1907)
- †Wheelerenomyia parva (Meunier, 1907) (synonym: Wheelerenomyia parvula (Meunier, 1907))
- †Wheelerenomyia pellucida (Meunier, 1907)
- †Wheelerenomyia perastutula (Meunier, 1907)
- †Wheelerenomyia perattica (Meunier, 1907)
- †Wheelerenomyia vladimiri (Negrobov & Selivanova, 2003)
