= Argentina (disambiguation) =

Argentina is a country in South America.

Argentina may also refer to:

== Places ==
- Argentina, Santiago del Estero, Argentina, a village
- Argentina (river), a river in Imperia Province, Italy
- Villa Argentina, a seaside resort in Uruguay

== Historical entities ==
- Colonial Argentina (16th century–18th century)
- Viceroyalty of the Río de la Plata (1776–1825)
- United Provinces of the Río de la Plata (1810–1831)
- Argentine Confederation (1831–1861)

== Music ==
- Argentina, a 1996 album by Thela
- "Argentina", a song by Jeremy Healy & Amos
- "Argentina", a song by Gunna from Wunna
- "Argentina", a song by Trueno featuring Nathy Peluso

== Other uses ==
- Argentina (plant), a genus of flowering plants
- Argentina (fish), a genus of fishes
- Argentina (brand), a Philippine brand of meat products
- Argentina (locomotive), a compound steam locomotive designed by Livio Dante Porta
- República Argentina (Madrid Metro), a station on Line 6
- Argentina, a variant of the Ligurian dialect Brigasc
- Callsign for Aerolíneas Argentinas, a leisure airline
- Argentina (Dexter), an episode of the American television series Dexter
- La República Argentina (sculpture), a monumental sculpture by Jean-Baptiste Hugues

== People with the name ==
- Imperio Argentina (1906–2003), Argentine singer and actress
- Argentina Altobelli (1866–1942), Italian trade unionist
- Argentina Apollo (1938–1984), Argentine professional wrestler
- Argentina Brunetti (1907–2005), Argentine actress and writer
- Argentina Díaz Lozano (1912–1999), Honduran writer
- Argentina Menis (1948–2023), Romanian discus thrower
- Tina Paulino (born 1973), Mozambique runner
- Argentina Rocca (1921–1977), Italian-Argentine professional wrestler
- Argentina Santos (1924–2019), Portuguese singer

== See also ==
- Argentia, Newfoundland, Canada
- Argentoratum, the ancient name of Strasbourg, France
- Argennina, a genus of spiders
- La Argentina (disambiguation)
- Argentine (disambiguation)
- Argentinia, a genus of flies
- La Argentinita or Encarnación López Julvez (1898–1945), Argentine flamenco dancer
- Largo di Torre Argentina, a piazza in Rome
- Name of Argentina
