= Argentine (disambiguation) =

Argentine is a citizen of Argentina. The Argentine was an older name for Argentina that is no longer commonly used.

Argentine, Argentinian and Argentinean may also refer to:

== Places ==
- Argentine, Kansas, United States
- Argentine, Michigan, United States
- Argentine, Savoie, a commune in France
- Argentine Township, Michigan, United States
- Argentine Township, Fall River County, South Dakota, United States
- Argentine station, a Paris Metro station
- L'Argentine, a mountain in the Alps

== People ==
- Argentine Alington (1876–1945), British vice-admiral
- Argentine Bellegarde-Foureau (1842–1901), Haitian educator
- John Argentine (died 1507), English physician
- Richard Argentine (died 1568), English physician and divine

== Other uses ==
- Silver and other similar metals
- Argentine (fish), a fish in the family Argentinidae or the herring smelts
- Spatalia argentina or Argentine, a moth in the family Notodontidae
- The Argentine, the subtitle for part one of the 2008 biopic Che about Che Guevara starring Benicio del Toro

== See also ==
- Argentina (disambiguation)
- Something of, from, or related to Argentina
- Argentino (disambiguation)
- Culture of Argentina
