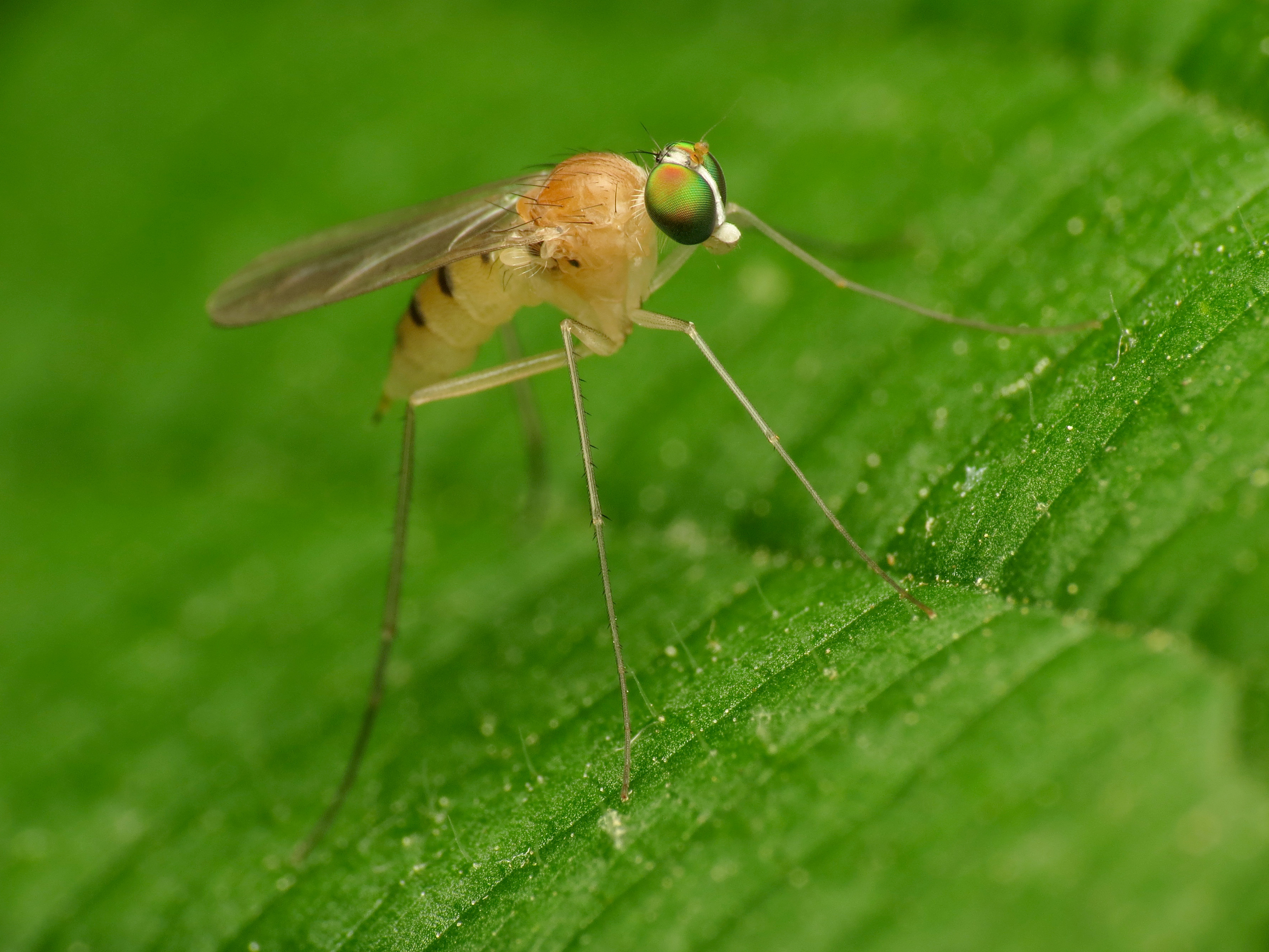

Scientific classification
- Kingdom: Animalia
- Phylum: Arthropoda
- Class: Insecta
- Order: Diptera
- Family: Dolichopodidae
- Subfamily: Neurigoninae
- Tribe: Neurigonini
- Genus: Neurigona
- Species: N. disjuncta

Binomial name
- Neurigona disjuncta Van Duzee, 1913

= Neurigona disjuncta =

Species of fly

Neurigona disjuncta is a species of long-legged fly in the family Dolichopodidae.
