= Jean-Baptiste Hugues =

French sculptor

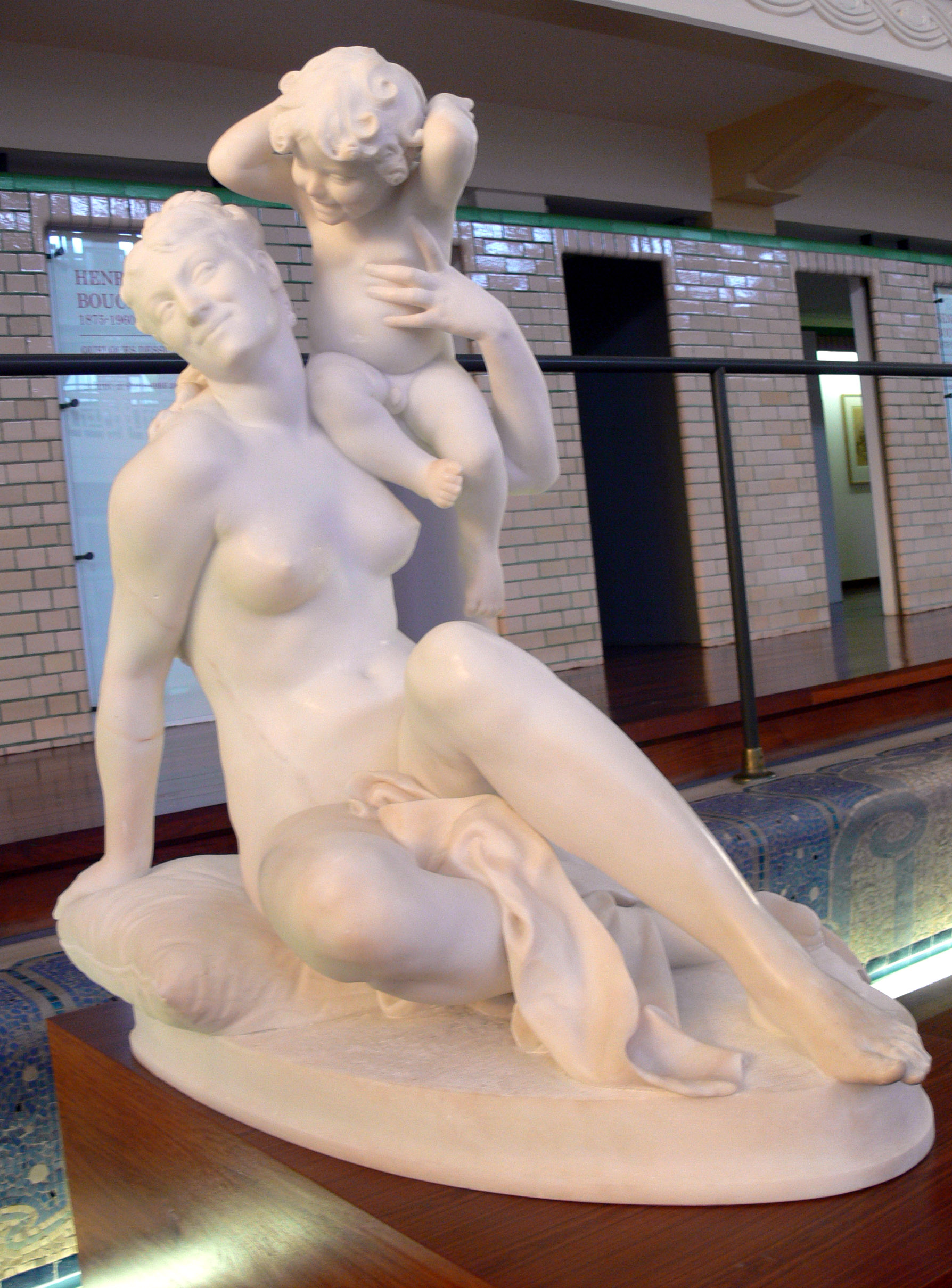
Femme jouant avec son enfant, La Piscine (museum of art and industry)

Jean-Baptiste Hugues (15 April 1849, in Marseille – 28 October 1930, in Paris) was a French sculptor.

He won the Grand Prix de Rome for sculpture in 1875. He was resident at the Villa Medicis from 1876 to 1879. When he was alive, he gained some fame : his works were exhibited at the Salons and were always commented on by critics and writers at the time. He produced several sculptures including La Fontaine des Danaïdes in Marseille or La Gravure at the National Library, pediments, bas-reliefs on monuments, busts, fountains and ceilings of Parisian restaurants.

== Works ==
- Ombres de Paolo et Francesca da Rimini, outline for the Prix de Rome, Musée d'Orsay, Paris, 1877
- Femme jouant avec son enfant, marble, La Piscine (museum of art and industry), Roubaix, 1880
- Œdipe à Colone, Musée d'Orsay, 1885
- La República Argentina, bronze, Escuela Técnica Raggio, Buenos Aires, 1889
- Limoges and Nantes, allegorical statues for the Gare de Tours, for architect Victor Laloux, 1898
- allegorical figures of Courage and Strength for the Hôtel de Ville, Tours, for Laloux, c. 1900
- La Muse de la source, font, marble and bronze, Musée d'Orsay, 1900
- La Misère, Jardin des Tuileries in Paris, 1907
- La Vigne, terracotta, Musée d'Orsay
- Buste de M^{elle} Rateau, patinated plaster
