= La Argentina =

La Argentina may refer to:

- La Argentina (dancer) (1890–1936), Argentine dancer
- La Argentina, Huila, a town and municipality in the Huila Department, Colombia
- La Argentina (poem), a 1602 poem by Martín del Barco Centenera
- La Argentina, a sail frigate used by the Argentine corsair Hippolyte Bouchard in his campaign 1817–19
  - Several other ships of the Argentine Navy have been named either La Argentina or ARA La Argentina, among them
    - ARA La Argentina (C-3), a light cruiser of the Argentine Navy commissioned in 1939
    - ARA La Argentina (D-11), a MEKO-360 type destroyer of the Argentine Navy commissioned in 1983

== See also ==
- Argentina
- Argentina (disambiguation)
