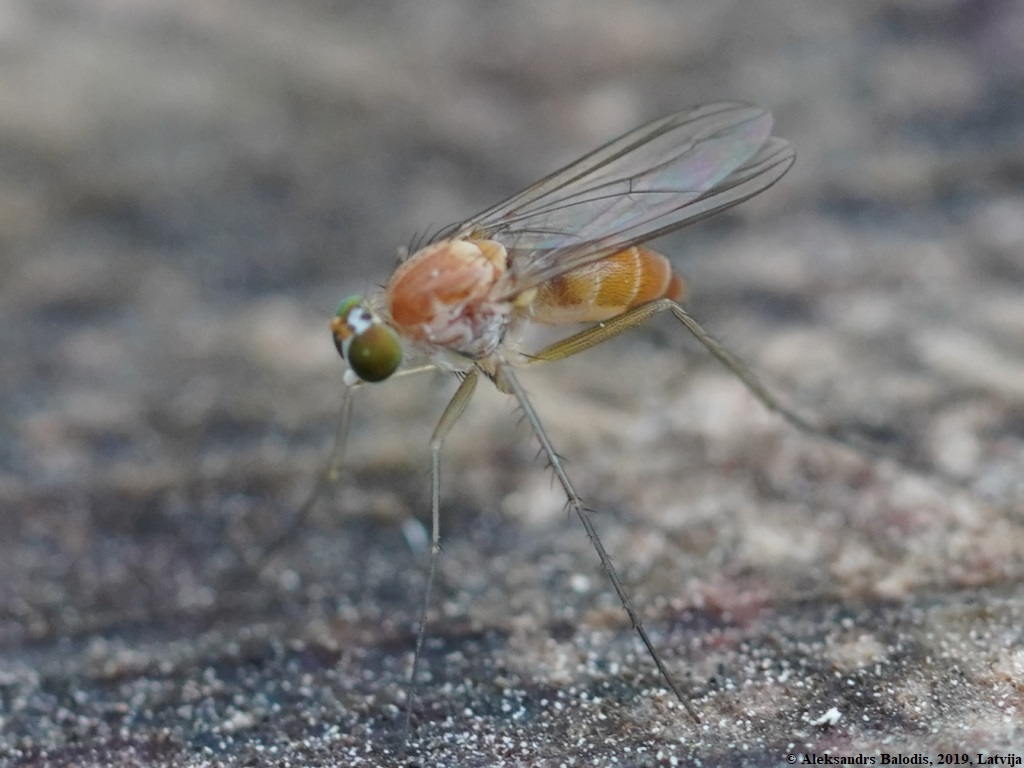

Scientific classification
- Kingdom: Animalia
- Phylum: Arthropoda
- Class: Insecta
- Order: Diptera
- Family: Dolichopodidae
- Subfamily: Neurigoninae
- Tribe: Neurigonini
- Genus: Neurigona
- Species: N. pallida

Binomial name
- Neurigona pallida (Fallén, 1823)

Synonyms
- Dolichopus pallida Fallén, 1823

= Neurigona pallida =

Species of fly

Neurigona pallida is a species of long-legged fly belonging to the Dolichopodidae family.
