= Neurigona aestiva =

Scientific classification
- Kingdom: Animalia
- Phylum: Arthropoda
- Class: Insecta
- Order: Diptera
- Family: Dolichopodidae
- Subfamily: Neurigoninae
- Tribe: Neurigonini
- Genus: Neurigona
- Species: N. aestiva

Binomial name
- Neurigona aestiva Van Duzee, 1913

Species of fly

Neurigona aestiva is a species of long-legged fly in the family Dolichopodidae.
