= Viridigona =

Scientific classification
- Kingdom: Animalia
- Phylum: Arthropoda
- Class: Insecta
- Order: Diptera
- Family: Dolichopodidae
- Subfamily: Neurigoninae
- Tribe: Neurigonini
- Genus: Viridigona; Naglis, 2003

Type species
- Neurigona viridis Van Duzee, 1913

Genus of flies

Viridigona is a genus of flies in the family Dolichopodidae. It consists of 28 species which are distributed in the Neotropics, with the exception of V. viridis which is known from the eastern United States. The generic name is a combination of the Latin word viridis (meaning 'green') and the ending of 'Neurigona', from which Viridigona is distinguished by its metallic green thorax and abdomen.

== Species ==
The genus includes the following species:

- Viridigona albisigna Naglis, 2003 – Peru, Venezuela
- Viridigona amazonica Naglis, 2003 – Brazil, Venezuela
- Viridigona argyrotarsis Naglis, 2003 – Costa Rica
- Viridigona asymmetrica Naglis, 2003 – Costa Rica
- Viridigona beckeri Naglis, 2003 – Brazil
- Viridigona bisetosa Naglis, 2003 – Chile
- Viridigona cecilia Naglis, 2003 – Costa Rica
- Viridigona costaricensis Naglis, 2003 – Costa Rica
- Viridigona flavipyga Naglis, 2003 – Costa Rica
- Viridigona guana Naglis, 2003 – Costa Rica
- Viridigona limona Naglis, 2003 – Costa Rica
- Viridigona longicornis Naglis, 2003 – Chile
- Viridigona longiseta Naglis, 2003 – Belize, Brazil
- Viridigona magnifica Naglis, 2003 – Brazil, Peru, Venezuela, Costa Rica
- Viridigona merzi Naglis, 2003 – Chile, Argentina
- Viridigona mexicana Naglis, 2003 – Mexico
- Viridigona minima Naglis, 2003 – Mexico, Panama, Costa Rica
- Viridigona nigrisigna Naglis, 2003 – Panama, Costa Rica
- Viridigona panamensis Naglis, 2003 – Panama
- Viridigona papallacta Naglis, 2003 – Ecuador
- Viridigona ponti Naglis, 2003 – Brazil
- Viridigona puntarena Naglis, 2003 – Costa Rica
- Viridigona rondinha Naglis, 2003 – Brazil, Bolivia
- Viridigona subrondinha Naglis, 2003 – Brazil
- Viridigona teutonia Naglis, 2003 – Brazil
- Viridigona thoracica (Van Duzee, 1931) – Panama, Dominica, Ecuador, Venezuela, Peru
- Viridigona tinalandia Naglis, 2003 – Ecuador
- Viridigona viridis (Van Duzee, 1913) – eastern United States, Costa Rica?
