= Paracoeloglutus =

Scientific classification
- Kingdom: Animalia
- Phylum: Arthropoda
- Clade: Pancrustacea
- Class: Insecta
- Order: Diptera
- Family: Dolichopodidae
- Subfamily: Neurigoninae
- Tribe: Coeloglutini
- Genus: Paracoeloglutus; Naglis, 2001
- Species: P. chilensis

Binomial name
- Paracoeloglutus chilensis Naglis, 2001

Genus of flies

Paracoeloglutus is a genus of flies from Chile in the family Dolichopodidae. It contains only one species, Paracoeloglutus chilensis. The generic name is a combination of the Greek word 'para' (meaning 'near') and Coeloglutus, a closely related genus. The specific name is derived from Chile, the country where P. chilensis was collected.
