= Amesorhaga =

Scientific classification
- Kingdom: Animalia
- Phylum: Arthropoda
- Class: Insecta
- Order: Diptera
- Family: Dolichopodidae
- Subfamily: Sciapodinae
- Tribe: Mesorhagini
- Genus: Amesorhaga; Bickel, 1994

Type species
- Mesorhaga femorata De Meijere, 1916

Genus of flies

Amesorhaga is a genus of flies in the family Dolichopodidae. All species in the genus are from the Oriental realm.

== Species ==
The genus contains seven species, all originally from Mesorhaga:

- Amesorhaga angulata (Parent, 1935) – West Malaysia
- Amesorhaga argentifacies (Parent, 1941) – Thailand, West Malaysia
- Amesorhaga breviappendiculata (De Meijere, 1916) – Java
- Amesorhaga femorata (De Meijere, 1916) – Java
- Amesorhaga malayensis (Parent, 1935) – West Malaysia
- Amesorhaga mellavana (Hollis, 1964) – Sri Lanka
- Amesorhaga pseudolata (Hollis, 1964) – Sri Lanka

Four further species of Amesorhaga, all extinct, were described from Baltic amber by Negrobov and Selivanova in 2003: A. bickeli, A. longicerca, A. quadrispinosa and A. vladimiri. These have since been moved to the extinct genus Wheelerenomyia by Igor Grichanov in 2008.
