= Mberu =

Scientific classification
- Kingdom: Animalia
- Phylum: Arthropoda
- Class: Insecta
- Order: Diptera
- Family: Dolichopodidae
- Subfamily: Neurigoninae
- Tribe: Coeloglutini
- Genus: Mberu; Capellari & Amorim, 2011
- Species: M. pepocatu

Binomial name
- Mberu pepocatu Capellari & Amorim, 2011

Genus of flies

Mberu is a genus of flies in the family Dolichopodidae. It is known from the Atlantic Forest in southeastern Brazil, and contains only one species, Mberu pepocatu. The generic name is the Tupi–Guarani word for "fly". The specific name is a combination of the Tupi–Guarani words pepo ("wing") and cato ("beautiful"), referring to the vein pattern of the wings.
