= Oncopygius =

Oncopygius Temporal range: Upper Oligocene–Present

Scientific classification
- Kingdom: Animalia
- Phylum: Arthropoda
- Class: Insecta
- Order: Diptera
- Family: Dolichopodidae
- Subfamily: Neurigoninae
- Tribe: Neurigonini
- Genus: Oncopygius; Mik, 1866

Type species
- Systenus ornatus Mik, 1866

Genus of flies

Oncopygius is a genus of flies in the family Dolichopodidae. It includes three living species in Europe, mainly recorded from montane habitats in Central and Southeastern Europe. Also associated with the genus are three extinct species known from fossils found in the Rott Formation of Germany, dated to the Oligocene.

== Species ==
- Oncopygius distans (Loew, 1857)
- Oncopygius formosus Parent, 1927
- Oncopygius magnificus Loew, 1873
- †"Oncopygius" gracilior Statz, 1940
- †"Oncopygius" oligocaenicus Statz, 1940
- †"Oncopygius" venustus Statz, 1940
