= Dactylomyia =

Scientific classification
- Kingdom: Animalia
- Phylum: Arthropoda
- Clade: Pancrustacea
- Class: Insecta
- Order: Diptera
- Family: Dolichopodidae
- Subfamily: Neurigoninae
- Tribe: Dactylomyiini
- Genus: Dactylomyia; Aldrich, 1894

Type species
- Dactylomyia gracilipes (= Medetera lateralis Say, 1829) Aldrich, 1894

Synonyms
- Coelinium Parent, 1939; Macrodactylomyia Naglis, 2002

Genus of flies

Dactylomyia is a genus of flies in the family Dolichopodidae. It includes 13 species known from eastern North America, Central America, Brazil, the Lesser Antilles, and the Hawaiian Islands. The only species recorded from the Hawaiian Islands is Dactylomyia vockerothi, recorded only from Midway Atoll; the species is an accidental introduction to Midway, probably from the main Hawaiian islands and ultimately from the Neotropics.

== Species ==
- Dactylomyia bicolor (Van Duzee, 1933) – Guatemala
- Dactylomyia bipectinipes Quevedo, Capellari & Lamas, 2025 – Brazil (Goiás, Mato Grosso do Sul, Minas Gerais)
- Dactylomyia corumba Quevedo, Capellari & Lamas, 2025 – Brazil (Mato Grosso do Sul)
- Dactylomyia coruscans (Parent, 1928) – Costa Rica
- Dactylomyia decora (Aldrich, 1902) – Lesser Antilles (Grenada, St. Vincent, Barbados)
- Dactylomyia ferrea Quevedo, Capellari & Lamas, 2025 – Brazil (Minas Gerais)
- Dactylomyia lateralis (Say, 1829) – eastern North America (USA and Canada)
- Dactylomyia magnicauda (Naglis, 2002) – Brazil (Paraná, Santa Catarina)
- Dactylomyia mexicana Naglis, 2002 – Mexico
- Dactylomyia parenti Naglis, 2002 – Costa Rica
- Dactylomyia sevilhae Quevedo, Capellari & Lamas, 2025 – Brazil (Distrito Federal)
- Dactylomyia tefe Quevedo, Capellari & Lamas, 2025 – Brazil (Amazonas, Maranhão)
- Dactylomyia vockerothi Bickel, 1998 – Hawaiian Islands (Midway Atoll)
