= Systenoides =

Scientific classification
- Kingdom: Animalia
- Phylum: Arthropoda
- Class: Insecta
- Order: Diptera
- Family: Dolichopodidae
- Subfamily: Neurigoninae
- Tribe: Dactylomyiini
- Genus: Systenoides; Naglis, 2002
- Species: S. paraguayensis

Binomial name
- Systenoides paraguayensis Naglis, 2002

Genus of flies

Systenoides is a genus of flies in the family Dolichopodidae. It is known from Paraguay, and contains only one species, Systenoides paraguayensis. The generic name refers to the similarity with the genus Systenus. The specific name is derived from Paraguay, the country where S. paraguayensis was collected.
