= Prosperidad (disambiguation) =

Prosperidad is Spanish for prosperity. It may refer to the following places:

- Prosperidad, municipality in the Philippines and capital of the province of Agusan del Sur
- Prosperidad (Madrid), a ward in the city of Madrid, Spain
  - Prosperidad (Madrid Metro), a station on Line 4 serving the Madrid ward
