= Avenida de América (Madrid Metro) =

Madrid Metro station

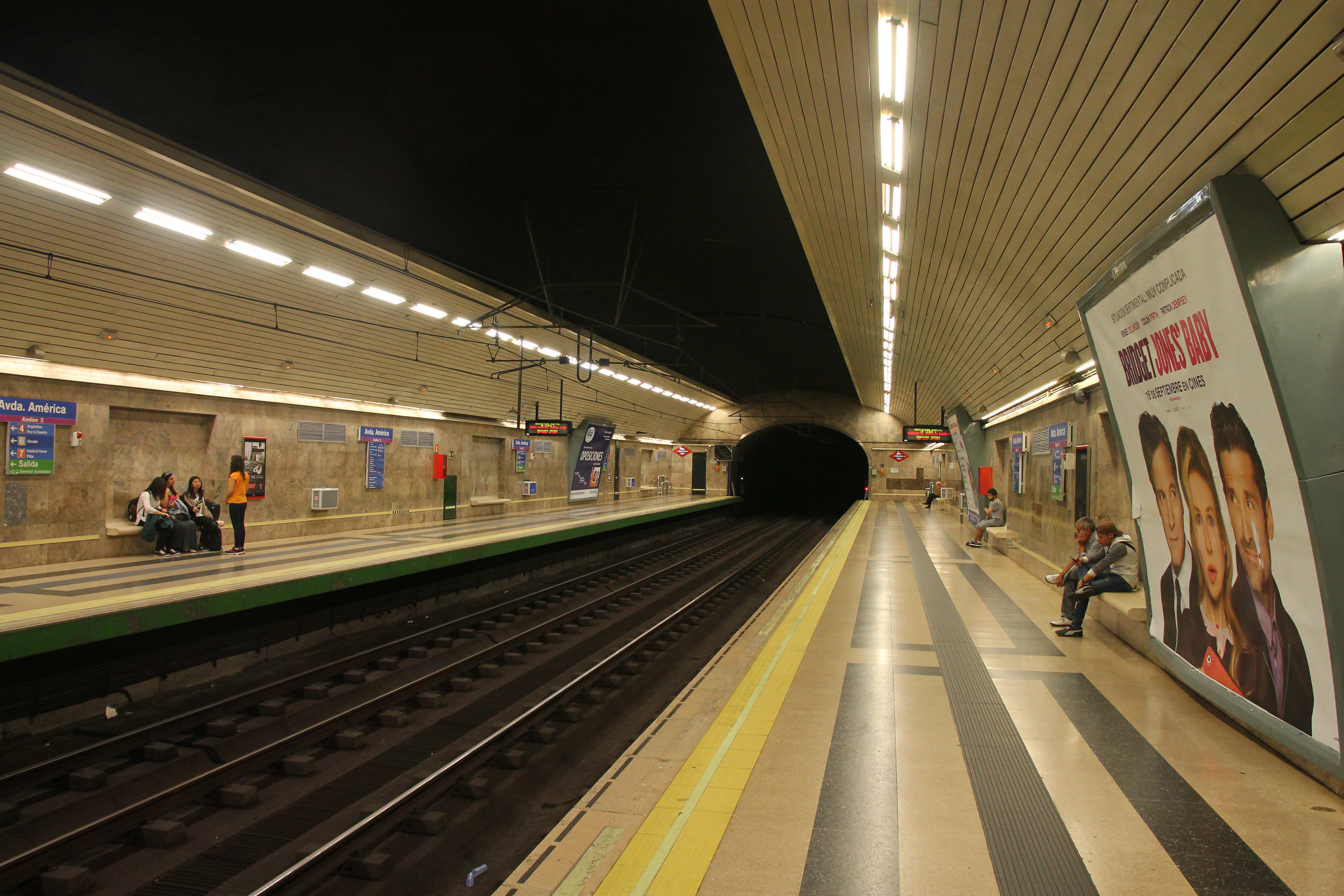
- Line 9 platform, Avenida de América

General information
- Location: Chamartín / Salamanca, Madrid; Spain
- Coordinates: 40.438035°N 3.6766893°W
- System: Madrid Metro station
- Owner: CRTM
- Operator: CRTM

Construction
- Structure type: Underground
- Accessible: Bus terminal only; accessibility to rest of station planned

Other information
- Fare zone: A

History
- Opened: 26 March 1973; 53 years ago

Services
Preceding station	Madrid Metro	Following station
Diego de León towards Argüelles	Line 4	Prosperidad towards Pinar de Chamartín
Diego de León clockwise / outer	Line 6	República Argentina anticlockwise / inner
Cartagena towards Hospital del Henares	Line 7	Gregorio Marañón towards Pitis
Cruz del Rayo towards Paco de Lucía	Line 9	Núñez de Balboa towards Arganda del Rey
Location
- Location within Madrid

Avenida de América ([aβeˈniða ðe aˈmeɾika]; "Avenue of the Americas") is a multimodal station in Madrid, Spain that services Madrid Metro Line 4, Line 6, Line 7, and Line 9, as well as city buses and intercity and long-distance coaches. Between 1986 and 1996, it also served Line 8. The station is located below the intersections of Avenida de América and Francisco Silvela and Príncipe de Vergara streets. The station consists of several underground levels, with the bus terminal located in the upper three and the Metro station located in the lower four. It serves the neighborhood of Prosperidad and El Viso in Chamartín district and La Guindalera in Salamanca district. It is about 15 minutes from Madrid Barajas Airport and 10 minutes from the city centre of Madrid.

== History ==
=== Madrid Metro station ===
The station was inaugurated on 26 March 1973 when Line 4 was extended from Diego de León to Alfonso XIII. The metro station was built from the start to service four Metro lines, and each platform was opened to the public when the corresponding line went into service. The Line 4 platforms are the shallowest in the Metro station, located at the fourth level below the street and aligned with Francisco Silvela street.

On 17 March 1975, Line 7 was extended to Avenida de América. The Line 7 platforms are the second shallowest in the Metro station, and are arranged in a Spanish solution layout with one central platform and two side platforms.

Four years later, on 10 October 1979, the Line 6 platforms entered service when the first stretch of Line 6 was inaugurated between Pacífico and Cuatro Caminos. Like the Line 7 platforms, it features a central platform and side platforms.

Another four years later, on 30 December 1983, a segment of Line 9 known as Line 9B was built, connecting Avenida de América to Plaza de Castilla. This segment was not connected to the rest of Line 9 until 24 February 1986, when the stretch from Avenida de América to Sainz de Baranda was built. The Line 9 platforms are the deepest in the station.

On 23 December 1986, service on the old Line 8 began between Avenida de América and Nuevos Ministerios using the existing Line 7 tunnel, so that each line used one track. When Line 8 and Line 10 were merged in 1996, Line 8 service ended at Avenida de América, and in 1998 Line 7 resumed the use of both tracks.

In recent years, the Line 6 and Line 4 platforms have undergone renovations. The Line 7 platforms were temporarily closed during September 2006 in order to replace the catenaries.

=== Bus terminal ===
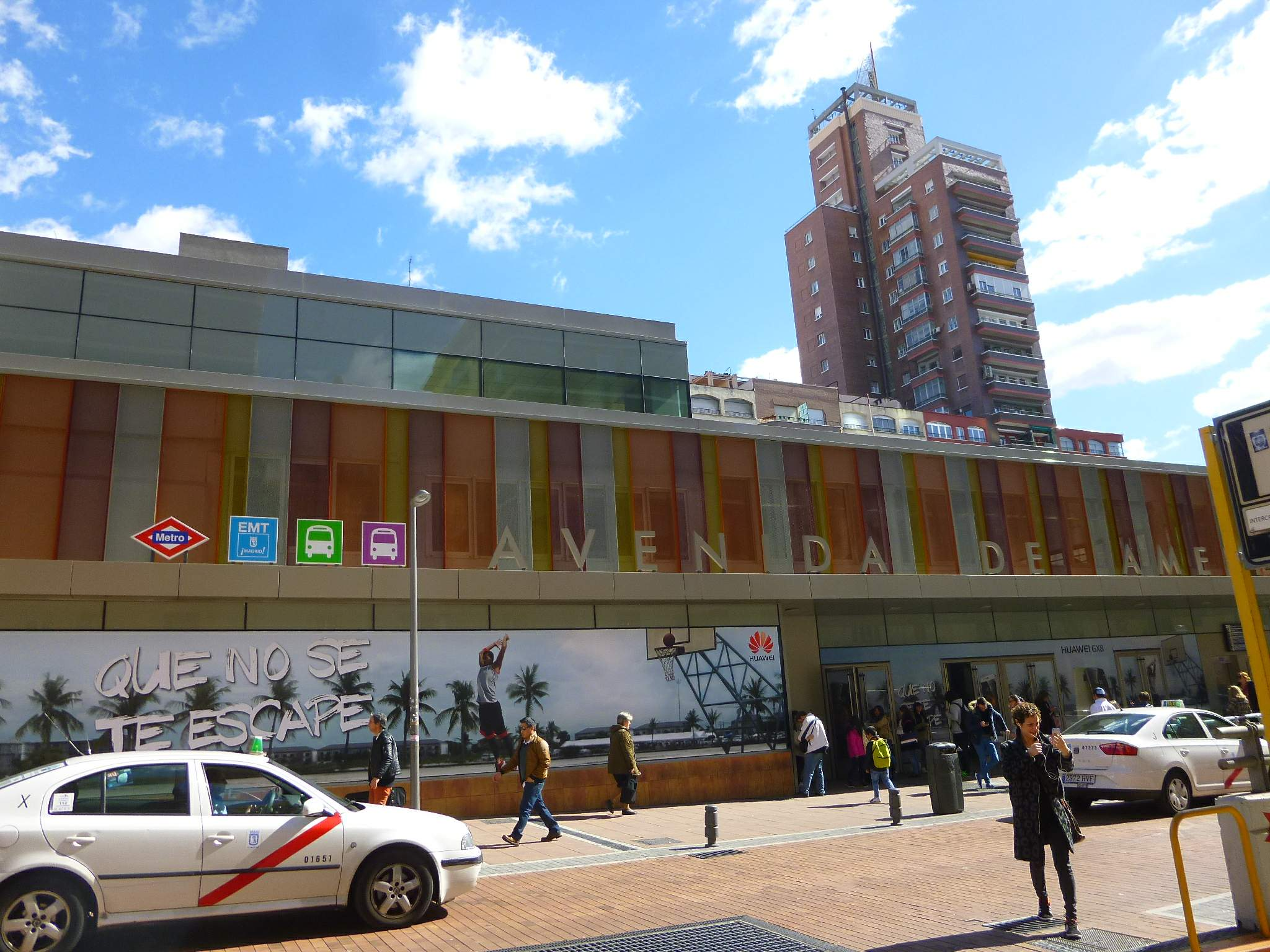
Exterior of the Avenida de América bus terminal

At the end of the 1990s, a three-level underground bus station was built above the metro station in the area previously used the Metro station vestibule. The station, which was the second underground bus station to be built in Madrid, was completed in 2000. It services city buses as well as interurban and long-distance coaches, and it houses stores and a parking garage.

Between 2009 and 2014, the second level of the bus station underwent renovations.

== Station layout ==
0	Street level	Exits/entrances (Lift to bus terminal on Avenida da America)
-1	Upper mezzanine	Bus terminal gates 20–36 (long-distance buses)
-2	Center mezzanine	Bus terminal gates 1–19 (urban/suburban buses)
-3	Metro mezzanine	One-way fare gates, ticket machines, station agent Transfer between platforms (Lowest level served by lifts; platforms not handicapped accessible)
-4; Line 4 platforms	Side platform, doors will open on the left
-4; Line 4 platforms	Eastbound	→ to Pinar de Chamartín (Prosperidad) →
-4; Line 4 platforms	Westbound	← to Argüelles (Diego de León)
-4; Line 4 platforms	Side platform, doors will open on the left
-5; Line 7 platforms	Side platform, doors will open on the left
-5; Line 7 platforms	Eastbound	→ to Estadio Metropolitano (Cartagena) →
-5; Line 7 platforms	Island platform, doors will open on the right for alighting passengers only
-5; Line 7 platforms	Westbound	← to Pitis (Gregorio Marañón)
-5; Line 7 platforms	Side platform, doors will open on the left
-6; Line 6 platforms	Side platform, doors will open on the left
-6; Line 6 platforms	Track 2	→ clockwise (Diego de León) →
-6; Line 6 platforms	Island platform, doors will open on the right for alighting passengers only
-6; Line 6 platforms	Track 1	← counterclockwise (República Argentina)
-6; Line 6 platforms	Side platform, doors will open on the left
-7; Line 9 platforms	Side platform, doors will open on the left
-7; Line 9 platforms	Southbound	→ to Puerta de Arganda (Núñez de Balboa) →
-7; Line 9 platforms	Northbound	← to Paco de Lucía (Cruz del Rayo)
-7; Line 9 platforms	Side platform, doors will open on the left
