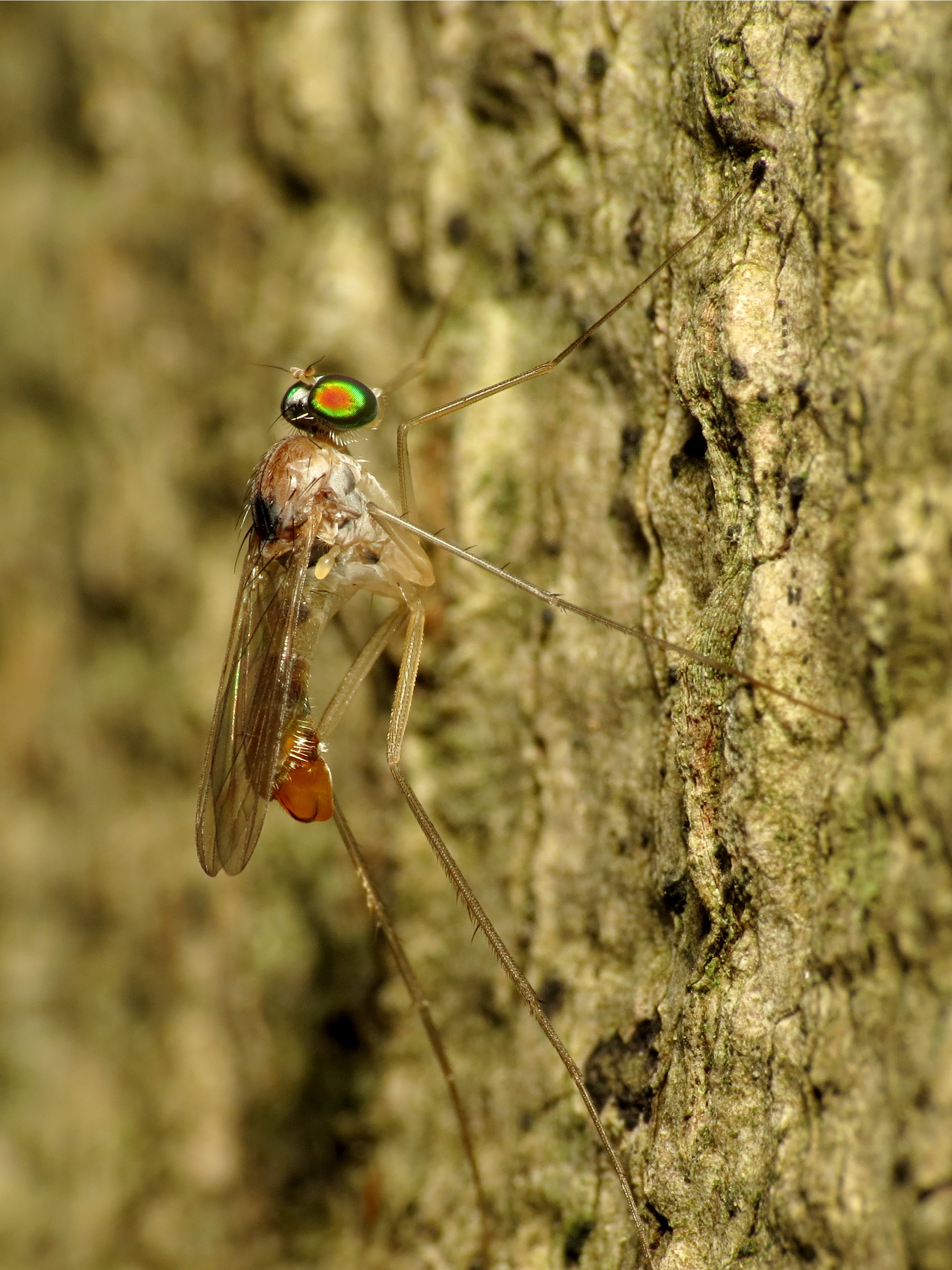

Scientific classification
- Kingdom: Animalia
- Phylum: Arthropoda
- Class: Insecta
- Order: Diptera
- Family: Dolichopodidae
- Genus: Neurigona
- Species: N. carbonifer

Binomial name
- Neurigona carbonifer (Loew, 1869)

Synonyms
- Saucropus carbonifer Loew, 1869

= Neurigona carbonifer =

Species of fly

Neurigona carbonifer is a species of long-legged fly in the family Dolichopodidae.
