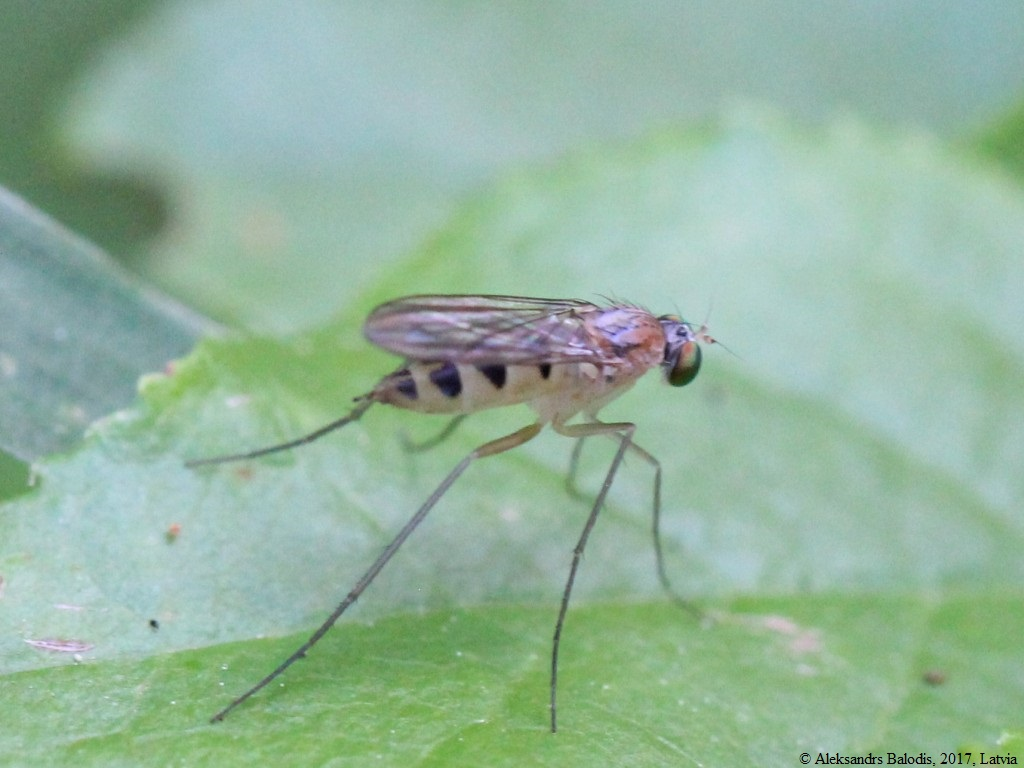

Scientific classification
- Kingdom: Animalia
- Phylum: Arthropoda
- Class: Insecta
- Order: Diptera
- Family: Dolichopodidae
- Subfamily: Neurigoninae
- Tribe: Neurigonini
- Genus: Neurigona
- Species: N. quadrifasciata

Binomial name
- Neurigona quadrifasciata (Fabricius, 1781)

Synonyms
- Dolichopus quadrifasciata Fabricius, 1781; Porphyrops erichsonii Haliday in Walker, 1851

= Neurigona quadrifasciata =

Species of fly

Neurigona quadrifasciata is a species of long-legged fly in the family Dolichopodidae.
