= Naticornus =

Scientific classification
- Kingdom: Animalia
- Phylum: Arthropoda
- Class: Insecta
- Order: Diptera
- Family: Dolichopodidae
- Subfamily: Neurigoninae
- Tribe: Neurigonini
- Genus: Naticornus; Olejníček, 2005
- Species: N. luteum

Binomial name
- Naticornus luteum Olejníček, 2005

Genus of flies

Naticornus is a genus of flies in the family Dolichopodidae. It is known from Laos, and contains only one species, Naticornus luteum.
