= Rubén Darío (Madrid Metro) =

Madrid Metro station

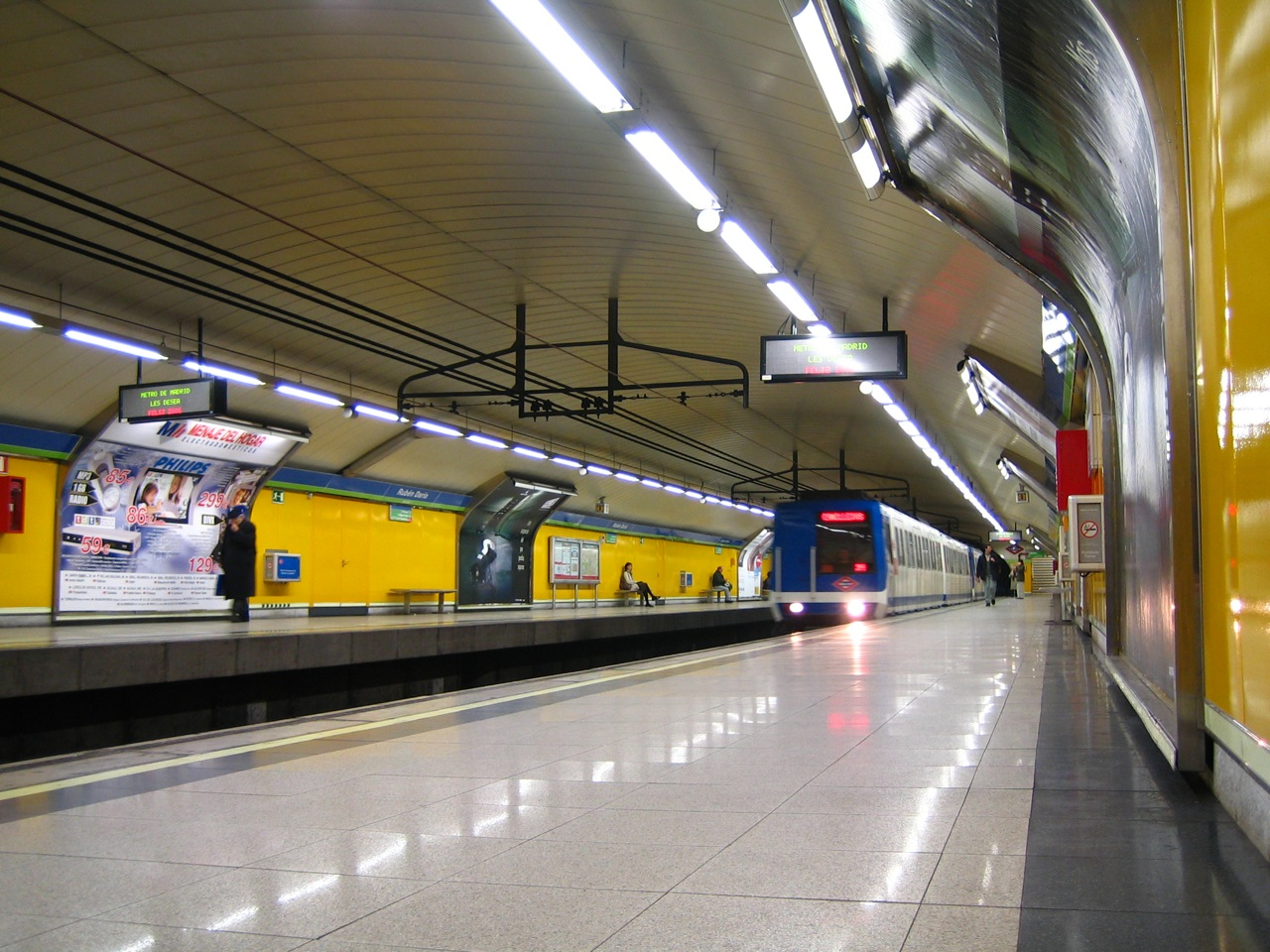

General information
- Location: Chamberí, Madrid; Spain
- Coordinates: 40.4331574°N 3.6895385°W
- System: Madrid Metro station
- Owner: CRTM
- Operator: CRTM

Construction
- Accessible: No

Other information
- Fare zone: A

History
- Opened: 26 February 1970

Services
Preceding station	Madrid Metro	Following station
Núñez de Balboa towards Alameda de Osuna	Line 5	Alonso Martínez towards Casa de Campo
Location
- Location within Madrid

Rubén Darío [ruˈβen daˈɾi.o] is a station on Line 5 of the Madrid Metro. It is located in Zone A.

The station was named after nearby Rubén Darío Plaza, which in turn was named after the Nicaraguan poet Rubén Darío.
