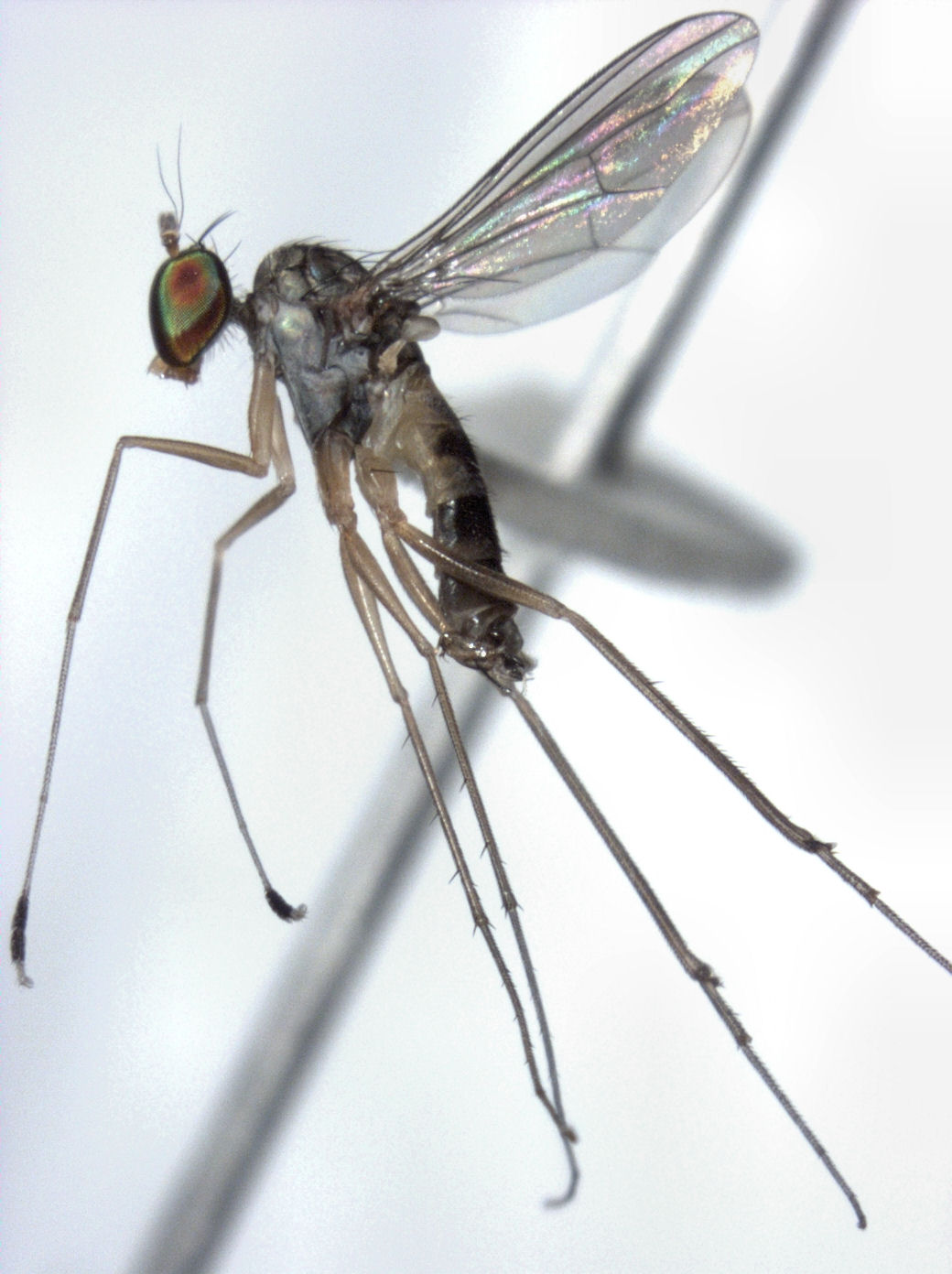
- Arachnomyia sp.

Scientific classification
- Kingdom: Animalia
- Phylum: Arthropoda
- Clade: Pancrustacea
- Class: Insecta
- Order: Diptera
- Family: Dolichopodidae
- Subfamily: Neurigoninae
- Tribe: Neurigonini
- Genus: Arachnomyia; White, 1916

Type species
- Arachnomyia arborum White, 1916

Synonyms
- Pleuropygius Parent, 1933

= Arachnomyia =

Genus of flies

Arachnomyia is a genus of flies in the family Dolichopodidae. It is known from Australia.

== Species ==
The genus includes three species:

- Arachnomyia arborum White, 1916 (Synonym: Pleuropygius longipes Parent, 1933) – Tasmania, South Australia, Victoria
- Arachnomyia cuprea (Macquart, 1850) – Tasmania
- Arachnomyia ornatipes Hardy, 1939 – Queensland
