= Spanish solution =

Train station layout that uses both island and side platforms

Spanish solution diagram: Passengers board from the left platform and alight onto the island in the centre.

In railway and rapid transit parlance, the Spanish solution is a station layout with two railway platforms, one on each side of a track, which allows for separate platforms for boarding and alighting.

== Description ==
This platform arrangement allows the separation of passenger streams by using one platform only for boarding and the other only for alighting. The separate designation of platforms for boarding and alighting has been proven effective at reducing dwell time at stations with high passenger numbers.

The Spanish solution is most commonly applied at high-frequency underground metro stations. Stations are sometimes retrofitted to include a Spanish solution layout to expand the capacity of existing stations when there is no space to widen the existing platform, an issue that can occur in island platform configurations.

To encourage passengers to exit to the correct platform, arriving trains typically first open their doors facing the platform for alighting passengers, and then open the doors for boarding passengers after a slight delay.

== Examples ==
In Spain, the Spanish solution is used in several stations of the Madrid Metro (e.g. Avenida de América) and Barcelona Metro (e.g. Sant Andreu).

It is now also used in many rail stations around the world. An example of the Spanish solution within Europe is the Karlsplatz (Stachus) station on the Munich S-Bahn in Germany, which has island platforms for boarding and side platforms for alighting. In Asia, the LRT platforms at Choa Chu Kang station in Singapore also use the Spanish solution. In the United States, Atlanta's MARTA rail system uses the Spanish solution at Five Points station, the system's primary transfer hub.

== Gallery ==
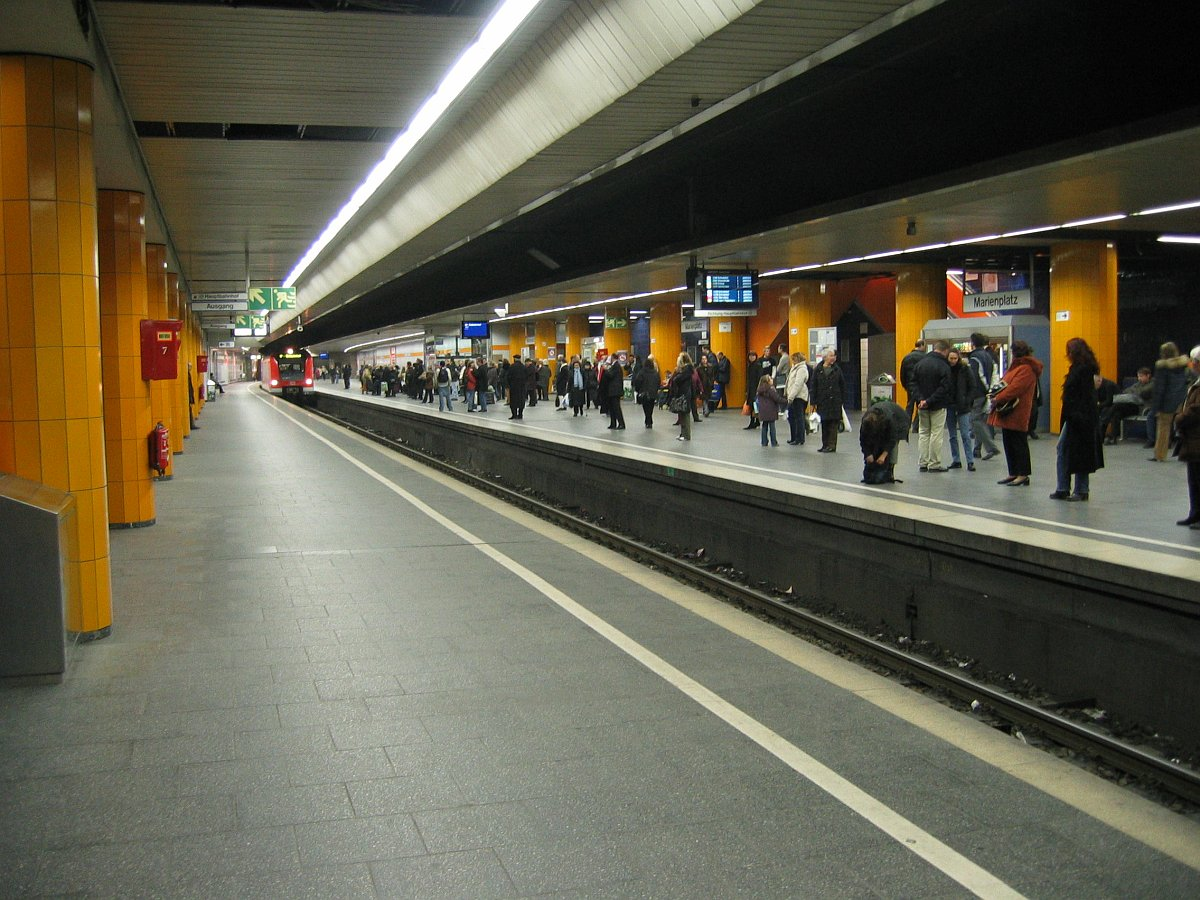
Eastbound track at Marienplatz station, Munich S-Bahn

Van Cortlandt Park-242nd Street Station on the 1 Line of the New York City Subway. This station actively uses the Spanish Solution to his day.

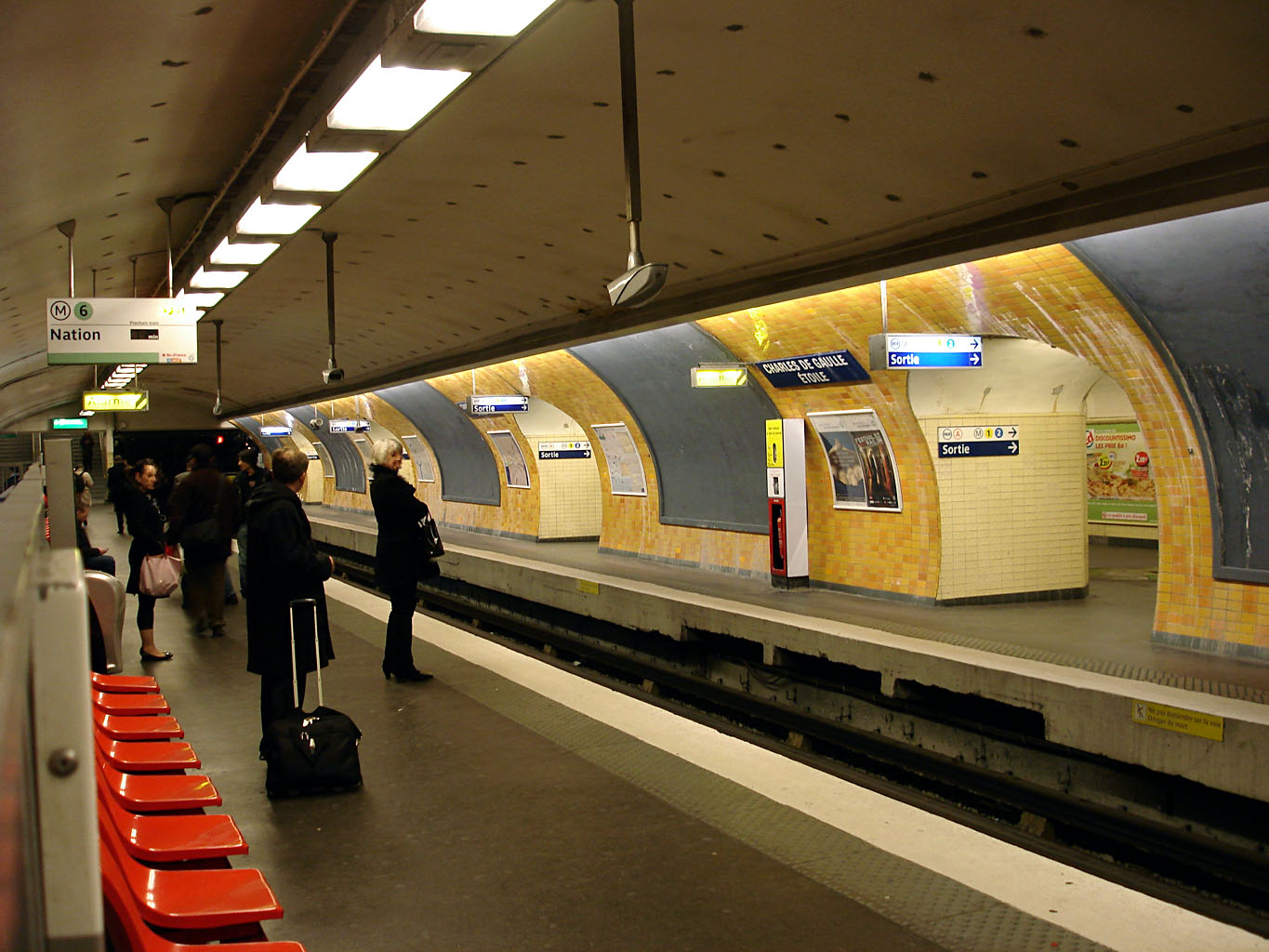
Spanish solution on Line 6 at Charles de Gaulle–Étoile, Paris Metro

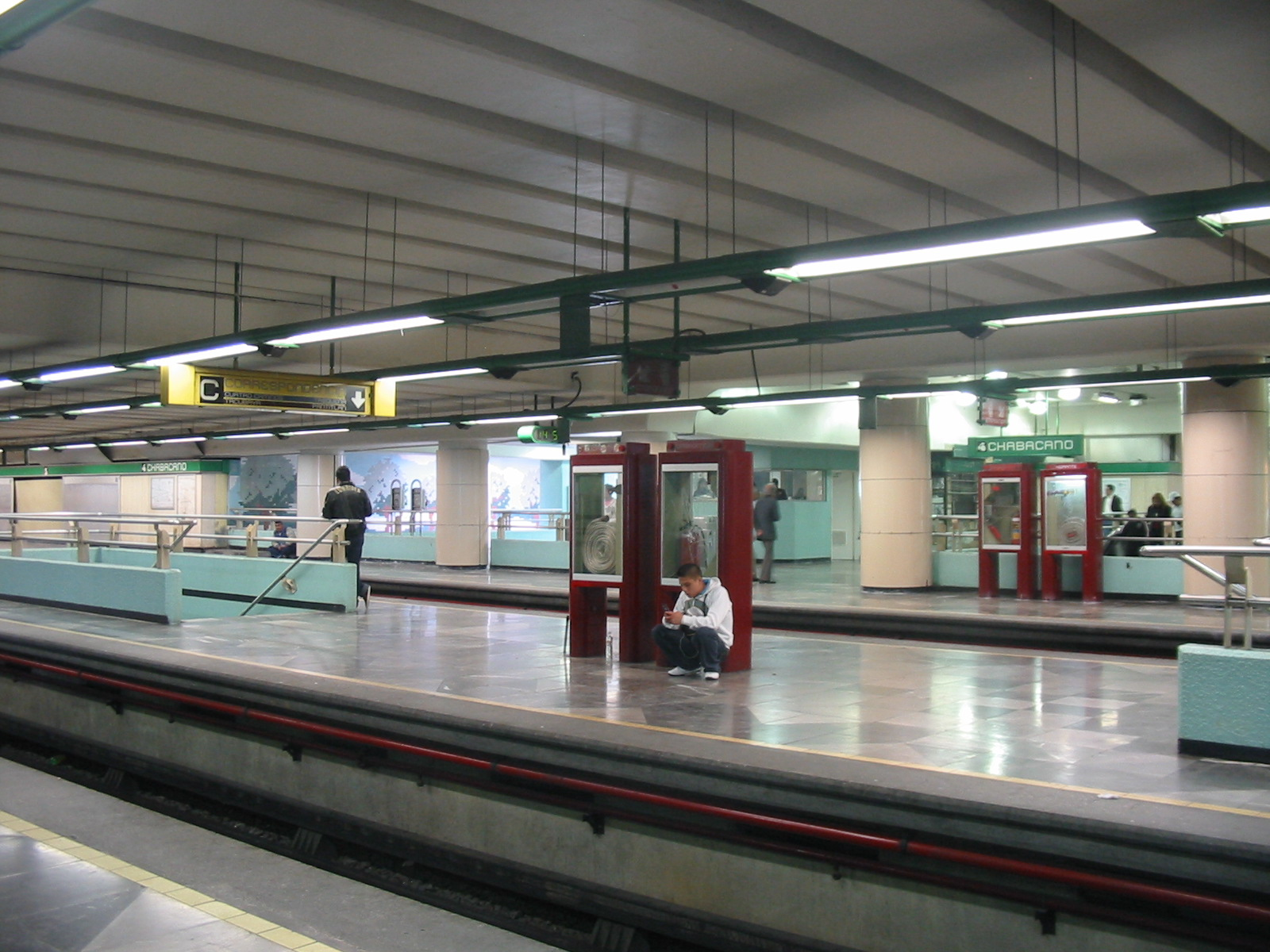
Platforms of the Chabacano station on Line 8, Mexico City Metro

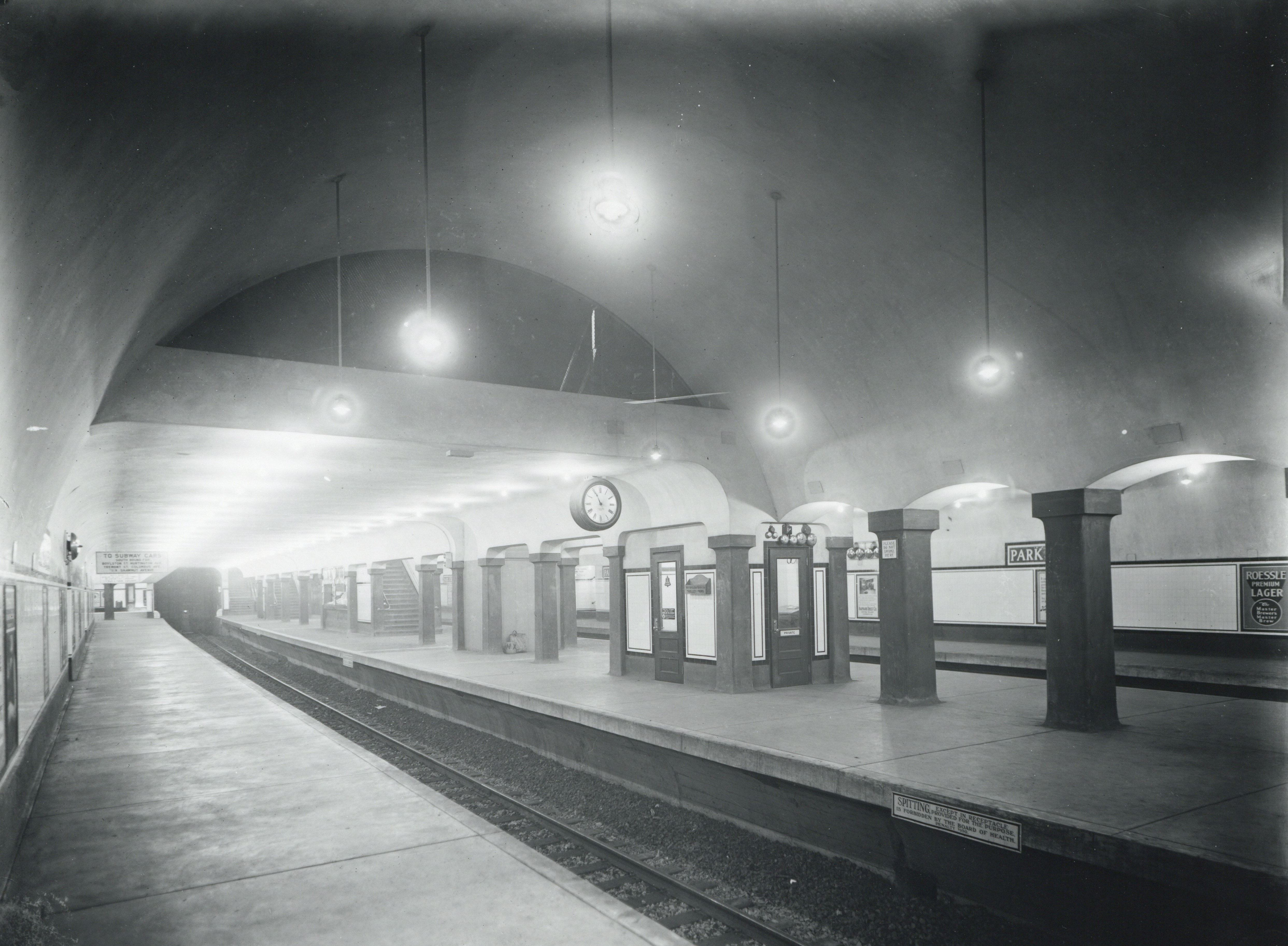
Boston's Park Street Under station in 1912. The same platform configuration is still in use.

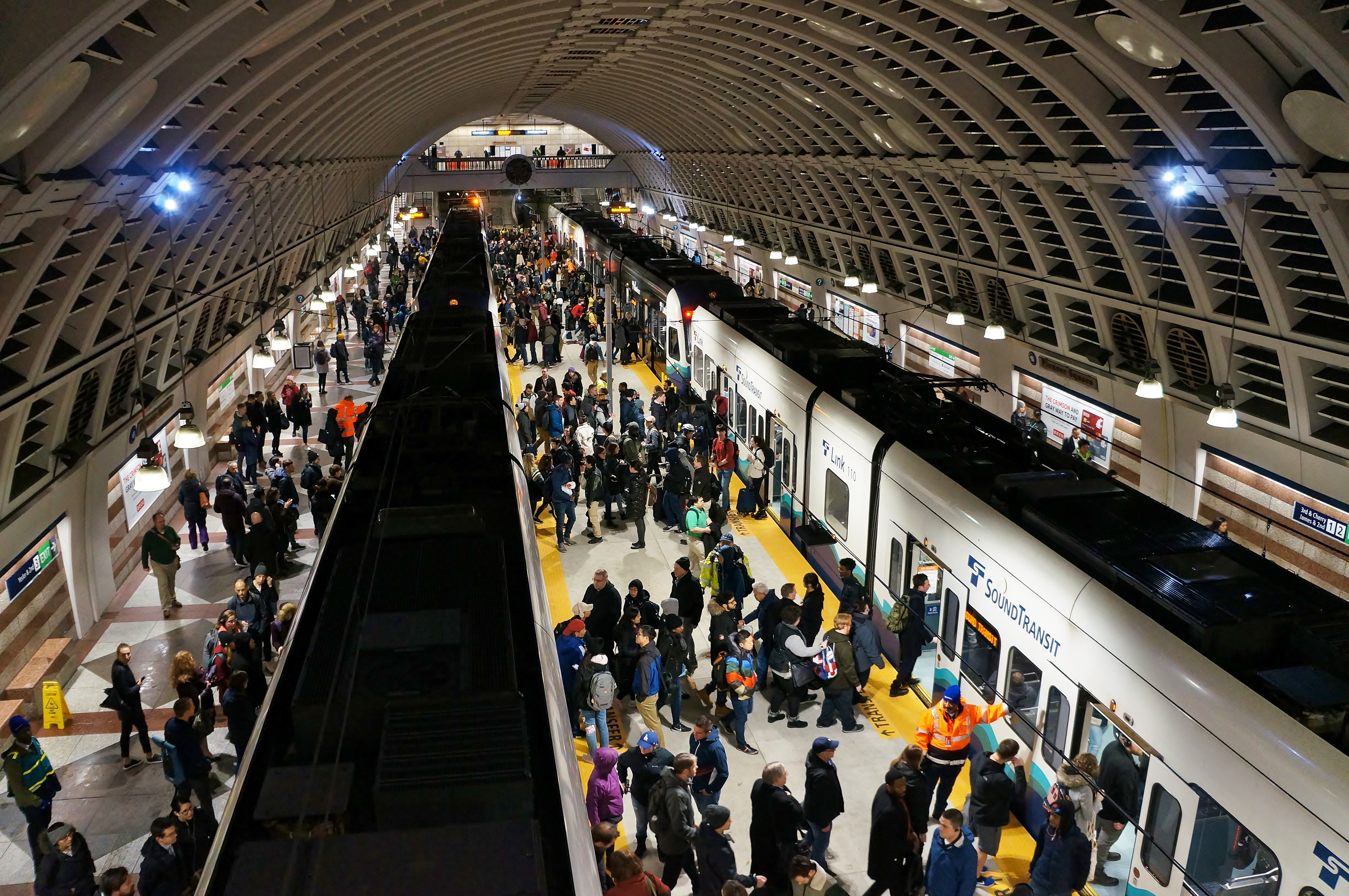
A temporary center platform at Pioneer Square station in Seattle used for transfers between trains

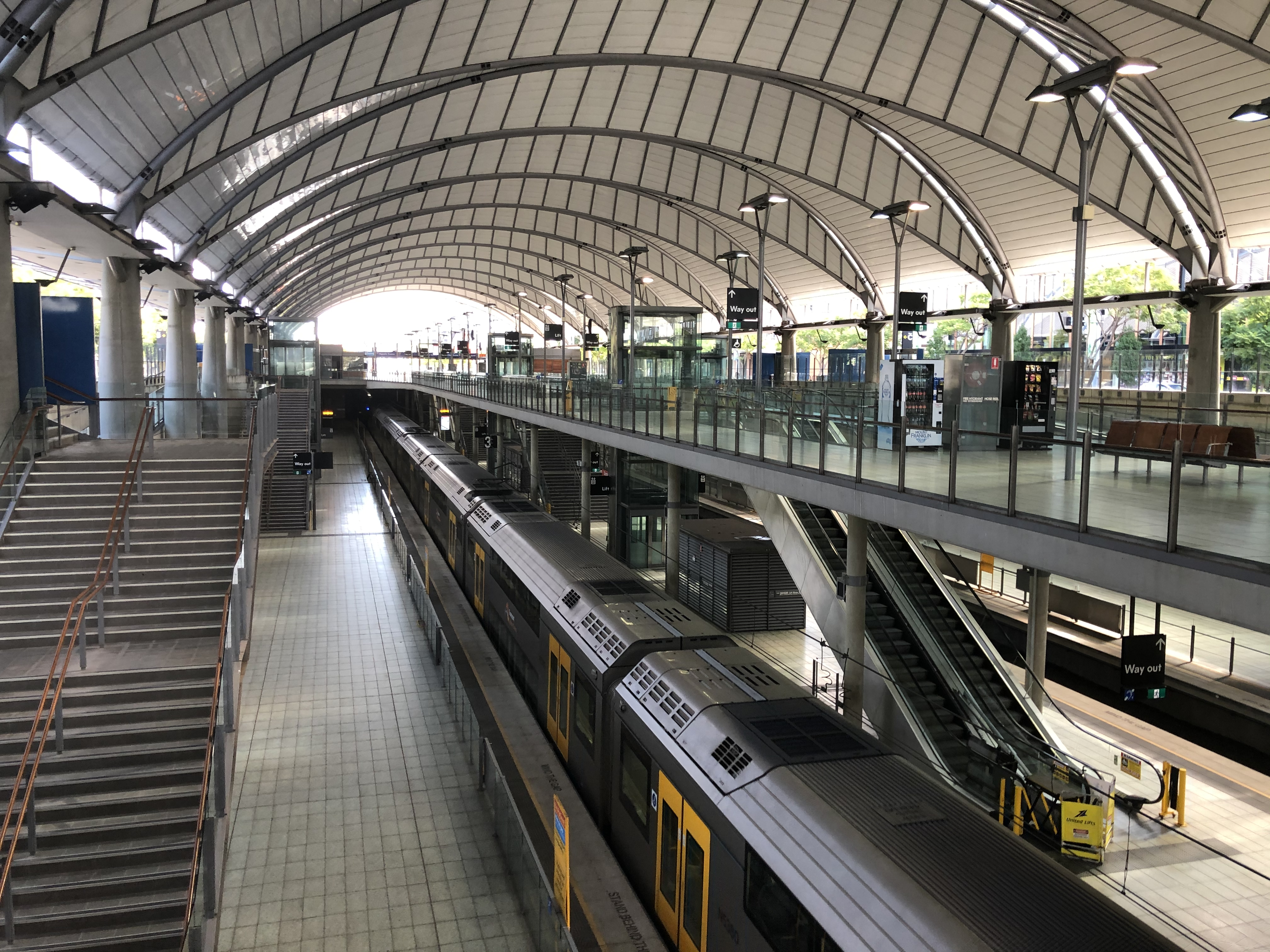
Olympic Park station in Sydney. All passengers alight on the island platform and board from the significantly wider outer platforms during major events.

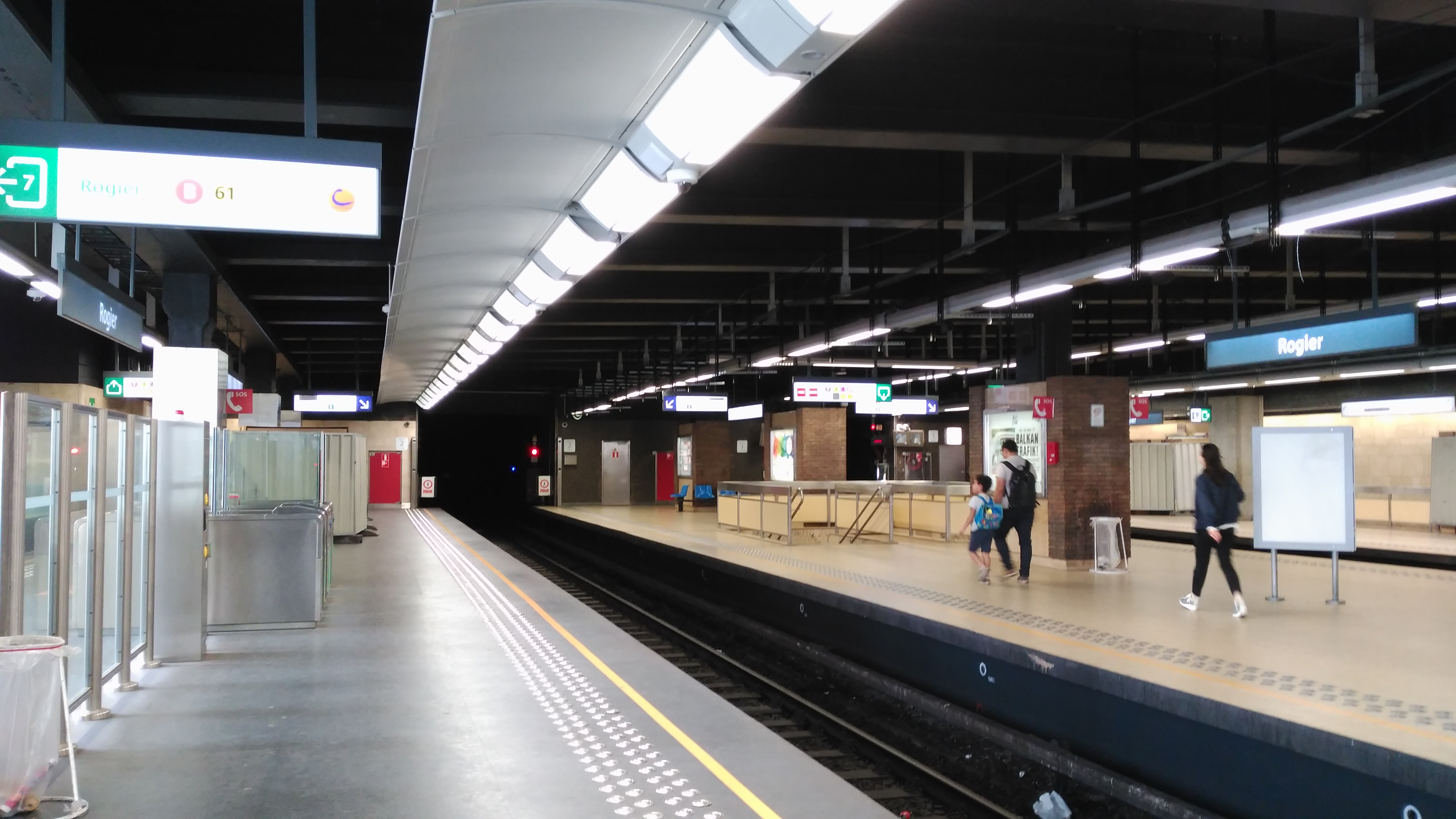
Platforms of the Rogier station on Lines 2 and 6, Brussels Metro

== See also ==
- Cross-platform interchange
- Interchange station
