= Neotonnoiria =

Scientific classification
- Kingdom: Animalia
- Phylum: Arthropoda
- Class: Insecta
- Order: Diptera
- Family: Dolichopodidae
- Subfamily: Neurigoninae
- Tribe: Coeloglutini
- Genus: Neotonnoiria; Robinson, 1970
- Species: N. maculipennis

Binomial name
- Neotonnoiria maculipennis (Van Duzee, 1929)

Synonyms
- Genus: Tonnoiria Parent, 1929 (nec Malloch, 1929); Species: Neurigona maculipennis Van Duzee, 1929; Tonnoiria angustifacies Parent, 1929

Genus of flies

Neotonnoiria is a genus of flies in the family Dolichopodidae. It is known from Brazil, Panama, Costa Rica and Peru, and contains only one species, Neotonnoiria maculipennis. The genus was originally named Tonnoiria by Octave Parent in 1929; however, this was preoccupied by Tonnoiria Malloch, 1929, so it was renamed to Neotonnoiria by Harold E. Robinson (1970).
