= Halteriphorus =

Scientific classification
- Kingdom: Animalia
- Phylum: Arthropoda
- Class: Insecta
- Order: Diptera
- Family: Dolichopodidae
- Tribe: Neurigonini
- Genus: Halteriphorus; Parent, 1933

Type species
- Halteriphorus mirabilis Parent, 1933

Species
- Halteriphorus mirabilis Parent, 1933; Halteriphorus thorpei Capellari & Cândido, 2024

Genus of flies

Halteriphorus is a genus of flies in the family Dolichopodidae, known from New Zealand. The genus was originally established for a single species, Halteriphorus mirabilis. A second species, Halteriphorus thorpei, was described in 2024.
