= Bickelomyia =

Scientific classification
- Kingdom: Animalia
- Phylum: Arthropoda
- Class: Insecta
- Order: Diptera
- Family: Dolichopodidae
- Subfamily: Neurigoninae
- Tribe: Neurigonini
- Genus: Bickelomyia; Naglis, 2002

Type species
- Bickelomyia nigriseta Naglis, 2002

Genus of flies

Bickelomyia is a genus of flies in the family Dolichopodidae. It is known from Mexico and Costa Rica. The genus is named after the Australian dipterologist Daniel J. Bickel.

== Species ==
- Bickelomyia canescens Naglis, 2002
- Bickelomyia flaviseta Naglis, 2002
- Bickelomyia nigriseta Naglis, 2002
- Bickelomyia setipyga Naglis, 2002
- Bickelomyia subcanescens Naglis, 2002
