= Núñez de Balboa (Madrid Metro) =

Madrid Metro station

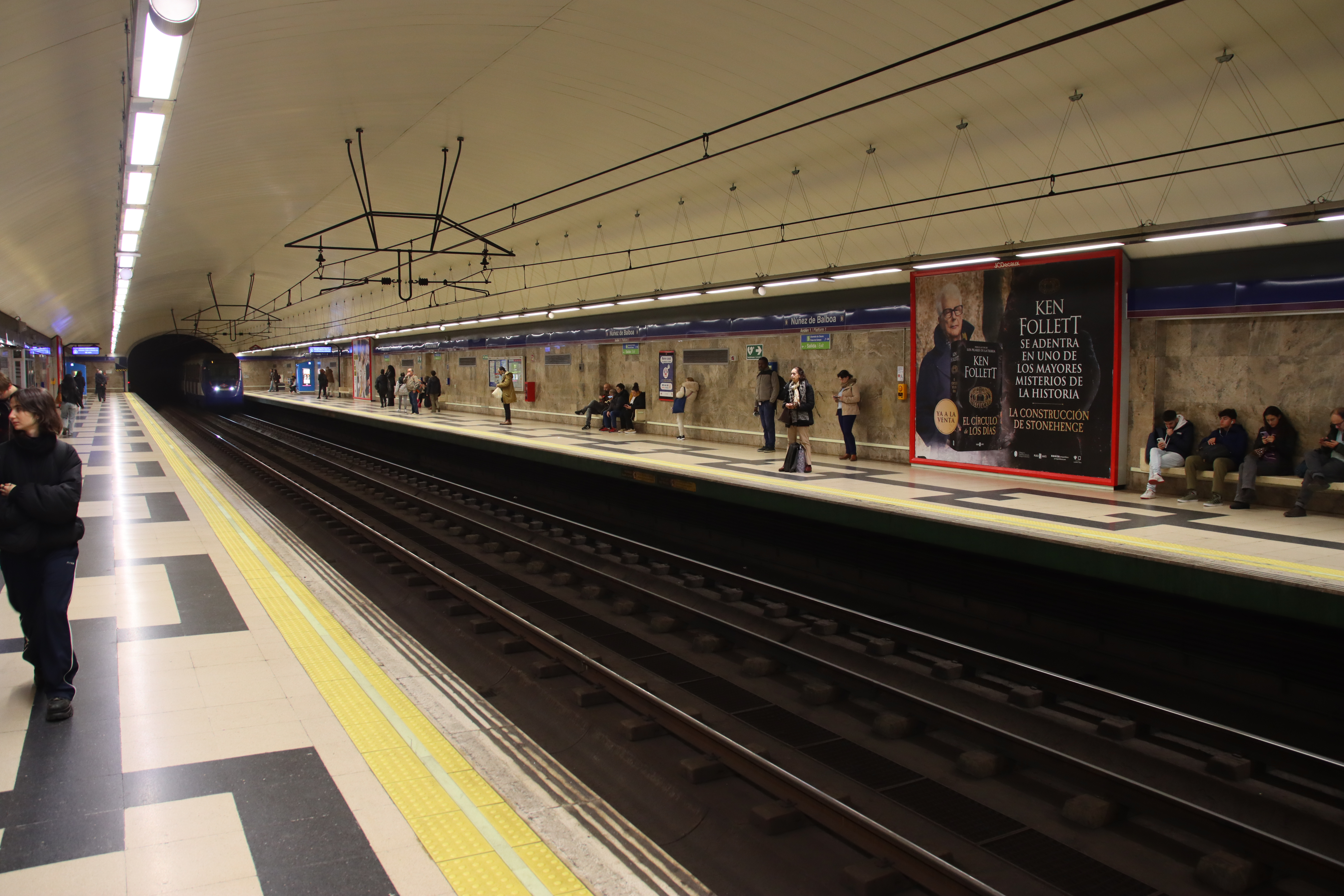
- Line 9 platforms

General information
- Location: Salamanca, Madrid; Spain
- Coordinates: 40.4327842°N 3.6825787°W
- System: Madrid Metro station
- Owner: CRTM
- Operator: CRTM

Construction
- Accessible: No

Other information
- Fare zone: A

History
- Opened: 26 February 1970; 56 years ago

Services
Preceding station	Madrid Metro	Following station
Diego de León towards Alameda de Osuna	Line 5	Rubén Darío towards Casa de Campo
Avenida de América towards Paco de Lucía	Line 9	Príncipe de Vergara towards Arganda del Rey
Location
- Location within Madrid

Núñez de Balboa [ˈnuɲeθ ðe βalˈβo.a] is a station on Line 5 and Line 9 of the Madrid Metro. It is located in fare Zone A.

The station is named after the Calle de Núñez de Balboa, which is named for the Spanish explorer Vasco Núñez de Balboa.
