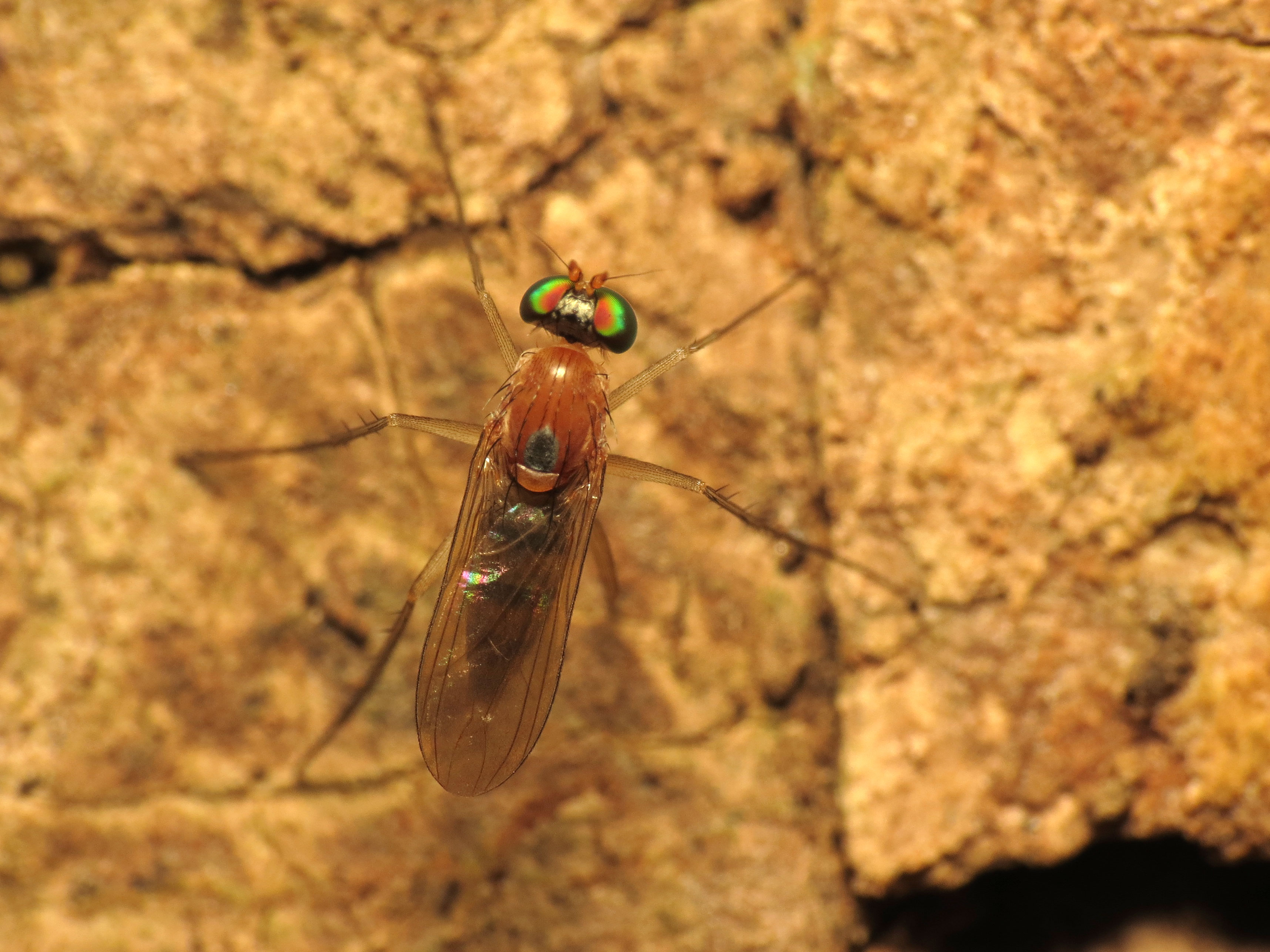

Scientific classification
- Kingdom: Animalia
- Phylum: Arthropoda
- Class: Insecta
- Order: Diptera
- Family: Dolichopodidae
- Genus: Neurigona
- Species: N. dimidiata

Binomial name
- Neurigona dimidiata (Loew, 1861)

Synonyms
- Saucropus dimidiata Loew, 1861

= Neurigona dimidiata =

Species of fly

Neurigona dimidiata is a species of long-legged fly in the family Dolichopodidae.
