= Coeloglutus =

Scientific classification
- Kingdom: Animalia
- Phylum: Arthropoda
- Clade: Pancrustacea
- Class: Insecta
- Order: Diptera
- Family: Dolichopodidae
- Subfamily: Neurigoninae
- Tribe: Coeloglutini
- Genus: Coeloglutus; Aldrich, 1896
- Species: C. concavus

Binomial name
- Coeloglutus concavus Aldrich, 1896

Synonyms
- Medetera sinuata Parent, 1928; Coeloglutus bicoloripes Van Duzee, 1933

Genus of flies

Coeloglutus is a genus of flies in the family Dolichopodidae. It is known from Guatemala, Ecuador, El Salvador, the Lesser Antilles (Dominica and St. Vincent), Puerto Rico, Costa Rica, Venezuela, Bolivia, Panama and Peru, and contains only one species, Coeloglutus concavus.
