= Argentinia =

Scientific classification
- Kingdom: Animalia
- Phylum: Arthropoda
- Class: Insecta
- Order: Diptera
- Family: Dolichopodidae
- Subfamily: Neurigoninae
- Tribe: Dactylomyiini
- Genus: Argentinia; Parent, 1931

Type species
- Argentinia annulitarsis Parent, 1931

Genus of flies

Argentinia is a genus of flies in the family Dolichopodidae.

== Species ==
- Argentinia annulitarsis Parent, 1931 – Argentina
- Argentinia bickeli Naglis, 2002 – Chile
- Argentinia unicolor (Parent, 1939) – Argentina
