= República Argentina (Madrid Metro) =

Madrid Metro station

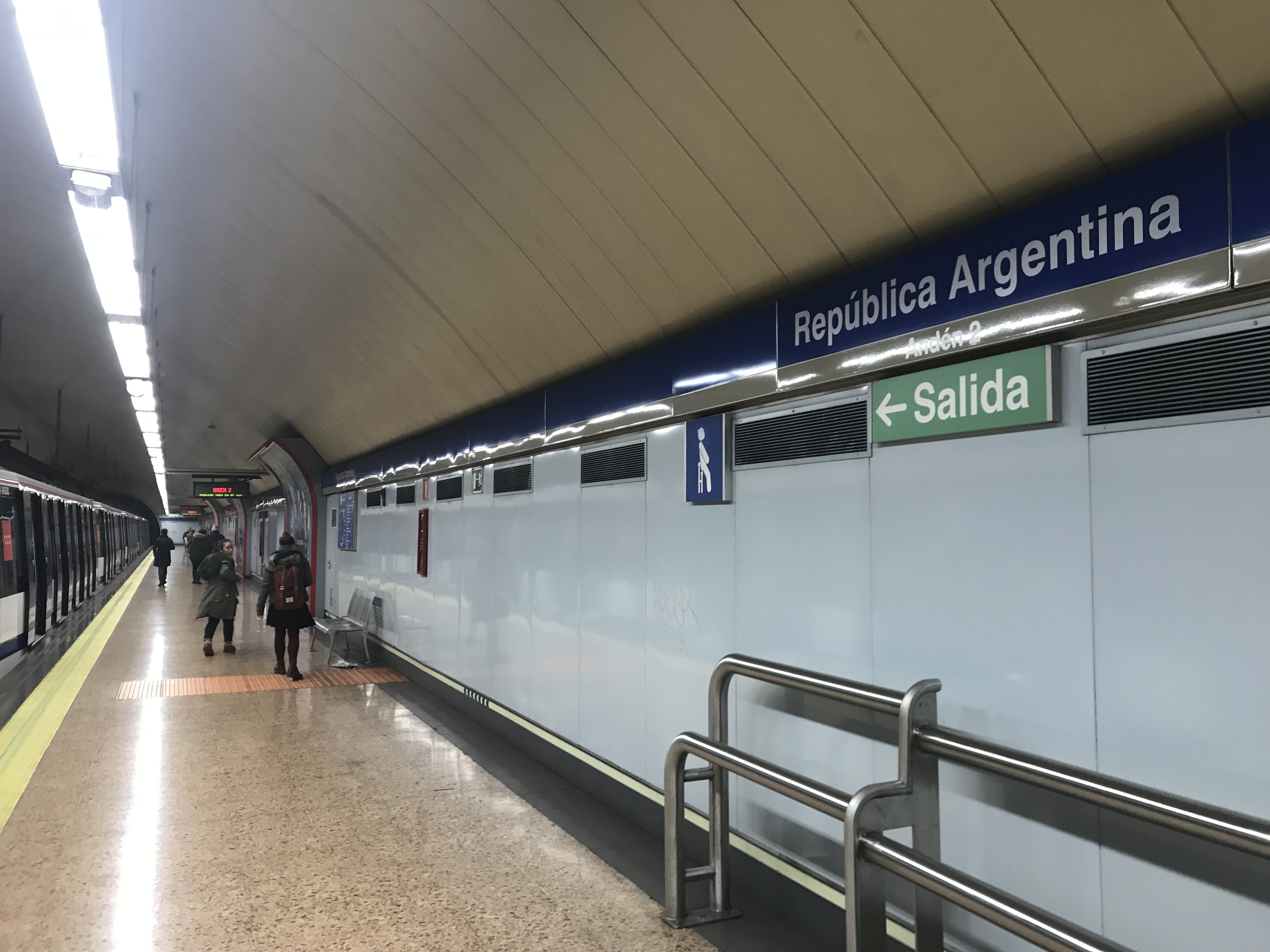

General information
- Location: Chamartín, Madrid; Spain
- Coordinates: 40.4437935°N 3.6840578°W
- System: Madrid Metro station
- Owner: CRTM
- Operator: CRTM

Construction
- Accessible: yes

Other information
- Fare zone: A

History
- Opened: 11 October 1979

Services
Preceding station	Madrid Metro	Following station
Avenida de América clockwise / outer	Line 6	Nuevos Ministerios anticlockwise / inner
Location
- Location within Madrid

República Argentina [reˈpuβlika aɾxenˈtina] is a station on Line 6 of the Madrid Metro. The station is located beneath the Plaza de la República Argentina (Argentine Republic Square) in the neighborhood of El Viso in Chamartín district in fare Zone A.

The station was already included in a development plan from 1967, but wasn't opened until 10 October 1979, when the first stretch of Line 6 was inaugurated.
