= Escuela Técnica Raggio =

Raggio Technical School
- Escuela Técnica Raggio
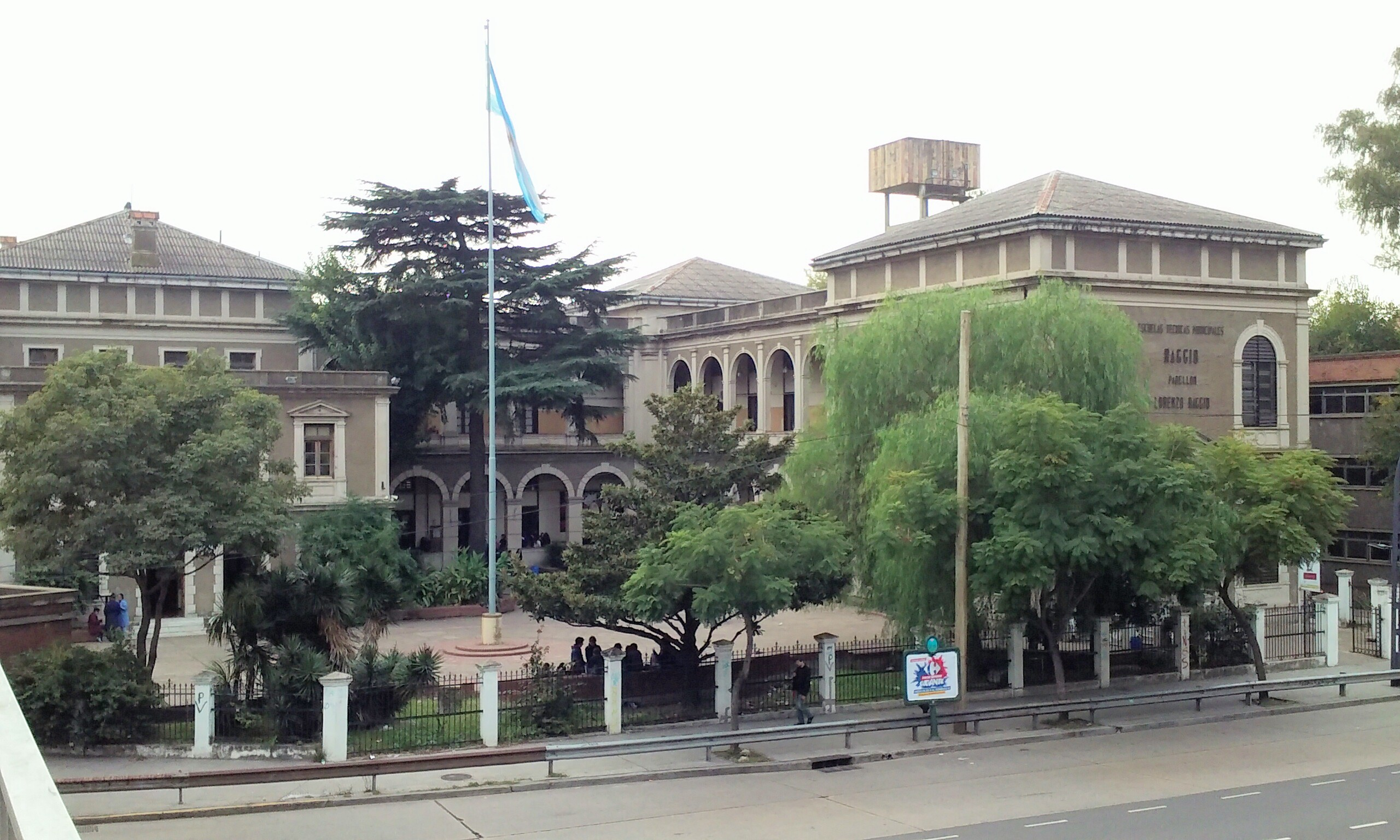

Location
- Buenos Aires; Argentina
- Coordinates: 34.5360°S 58.4662°W

Information
- Former name: Escuela de Artes y Oficios
- School type: Technical school
- Established: 1924
- Language: Spanish
- Website: www.escuelaraggio.edu.ar

The Escuela Técnica Raggio (Spanish for 'Raggio Technical School') is a government-run secondary school in Buenos Aires, Argentina. The school is located in Nuñez, on Avenida del Libertador near Avenida General Paz.

It is the only technical school in Buenos Aires that wasn't a part of the National Council of Technical Education (CONET), a national organization that grouped trade schools together between 1959 and 1994.

== History ==
The Raggio Technical School was designed and built by civil engineers Emilio Seitún and Andrés T. Raggio, brother of Rómulo Raggio, the sponsor of the construction of the building.

The school originally had two pavilions, the Lorenzo Raggio for the boys, and the María Celle de Raggio for the girls, both named in honour of the parents of the Raggio brothers.

Andrés Raggio managed the construction of the building. The school was inaugurated on 8 December 1924, in a ceremony that was attended by Argentina's President Marcelo Torcuato de Alvear and the Governor of Buenos Aires, Carlos Noel. Other attendees included the first lady Mrs. Regina Pacini, the secretaries of the intendant Dr. Emilio Ravignani and Don Antonio Barrier Nicholson.

On the occasion of the expansion of the Plaza San Martín in the Retiro neighborhood, the municipality dismounted the Argentinian Pavilion between 1932 and 1934 and transferred the sculpture symbolizing the Argentinian Republic to the Raggio Technical School.

The school was donated to the City of Buenos Aires.

The Buenos Aires City Legislature declared of educational interest the approval for the 90 years of the foundation of the Raggio Technical Schools to be celebrated on 8 December 2014. The resolution, approved on 30 October 2014 in the session room gave rise to a commemoration that took place in the Salón Dorado of the Buenos Aires Legislature.

== Building ==
Its romantic arches characterize the building as Neoclassical architecture. It was raised in two pavilions with the names of the Raggio marriage, María Celle for the female students, and Lorenzo Raggio for the male students, which worked separately as it was common then. The female pavilion was demolished in 1960 to unify General Paz Avenue with Lugones Avenue. The school was donated to the City of Buenos Aires' hall. Its open architectural approach is new, valuing the green spaces for expansion and recreational areas

== Museum ==
Inside the school, there is the techno-educational museum known as Lorenzo Raggio, which objective is the recovery, the restoration, and the cataloging of photographic, artistic, technical material found in the institution.

There are the Colon Theater builders plans, that is a set of more than 30 plans from 1892 sealed by the architect Vittorio Meano studio, who was one of the three architects involved in the project. These documents, that were in the school library for many years, were used by former teachers of the school, Federico Federicci and Cayetano Donato, who worked in the construction and in the maintenance of the Colon Theater scenography.
