= Argentin (surname) =

Argentin is a surname. Notable people with the surname include:

- Christian Argentin (1893–1955), French actor
- Moreno Argentin (born 1960), Italian cyclist and race director
- Raymond Argentin (1924–2022), French sprint canoeist
