= Club Argentino de Rugby =

Argentine rugby union and field hockey club

(Argentina) Argentino
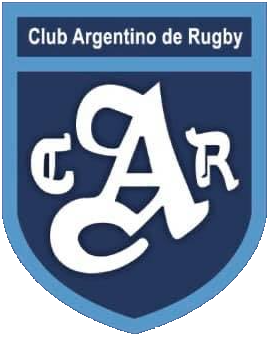
- Full name: Club Argentino de Rugby
- Union: URBA
- Founded: 3 March 1977; 48 years ago
- Ground(s): Avellaneda, Argentina
- Chairman: Horacio Gerardi
- League: URBA Primera B
- 2025: 9th.
Team kit

Official website
- argentinoderugby.com.ar

Club Argentino de Rugby, simply known as Argentino, is an Argentine amateur sports club headquartered in Avellaneda, Greater Buenos Aires. The rugby union stadium is located on the km 43,5 of the Autovía 2 (the main road to the city of Mar del Plata). The team currently plays in Primera B, the third division of the Unión de Rugby de Buenos Aires league system.

Argentino also has a field hockey section, affiliated to the Buenos Aires Hockey Association.

== History ==
By 1976 a group of veteran rugby players decided to create a club where to play the sport they loved. On March 3, 1977, Club Argentino de Rugby was founded, with the participation of children from 8 to 12 years old and their parents also collaborating with the project.

At first, they trained in a little square, moving then to a football field rented to the Asociación Cristiana de Jóvenes (Youth Christian Association) and finally in Club Arsenal de Sarandí. Argentino's home games were played in a rented field owned by the Dirección Nacional de Vialidad (the organism that regulates the roads of Argentina), which was located in Ezeiza, Buenos Aires.

The first jerseys were sold in a pharmacy and the administration office worked in a little room of the Círculo Universitario de Avellaneda.

The team promoted to first division in 1987 and 1997 but would be later relegated to a lower category. In 2011 Argentino was relegated to third division.
