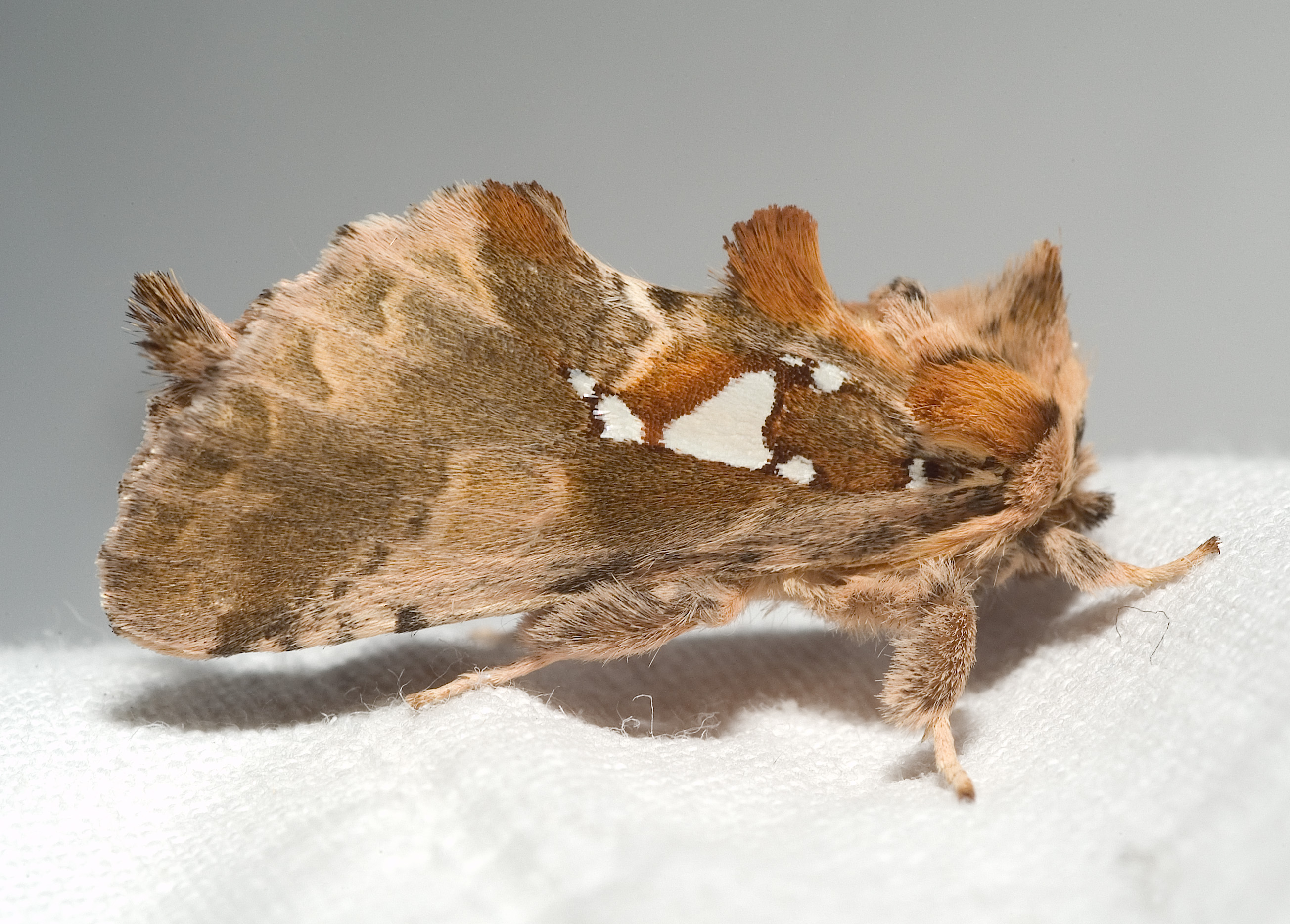

Scientific classification
- Kingdom: Animalia
- Phylum: Arthropoda
- Clade: Pancrustacea
- Class: Insecta
- Order: Lepidoptera
- Superfamily: Noctuoidea
- Family: Notodontidae
- Genus: Spatalia
- Species: S. argentina

Binomial name
- Spatalia argentina (Denis & Schiffermüller, 1775)

= Spatalia argentina =

Species of moth

Spatalia argentina, the Argentine, is a species of moth in the family Notodontidae. It is found in central and southern Europe, through Turkey and Iraq, up to Iran.

The wingspan is 35–40 millimetres (1.4–1.6 in). The moth flies from April to August in two generations depending on the location.

The larvae mainly feed on Quercus species but also on Salix and Populus species.
