= Mesorhagini =

Scientific classification
- Kingdom: Animalia
- Phylum: Arthropoda
- Class: Insecta
- Order: Diptera
- Family: Dolichopodidae
- Subfamily: Sciapodinae
- Tribe: Mesorhagini; Bickel, 1994

Genera
- see text

Tribe of flies

Mesorhagini is a tribe of flies in the family Dolichopodidae.

== Genera ==
- Amesorhaga Bickel, 1994
- Mesorhaga Schiner, 1868
- Negrobovia Bickel, 1994
