= La República Argentina (sculpture) =

- English: The Argentine Republic
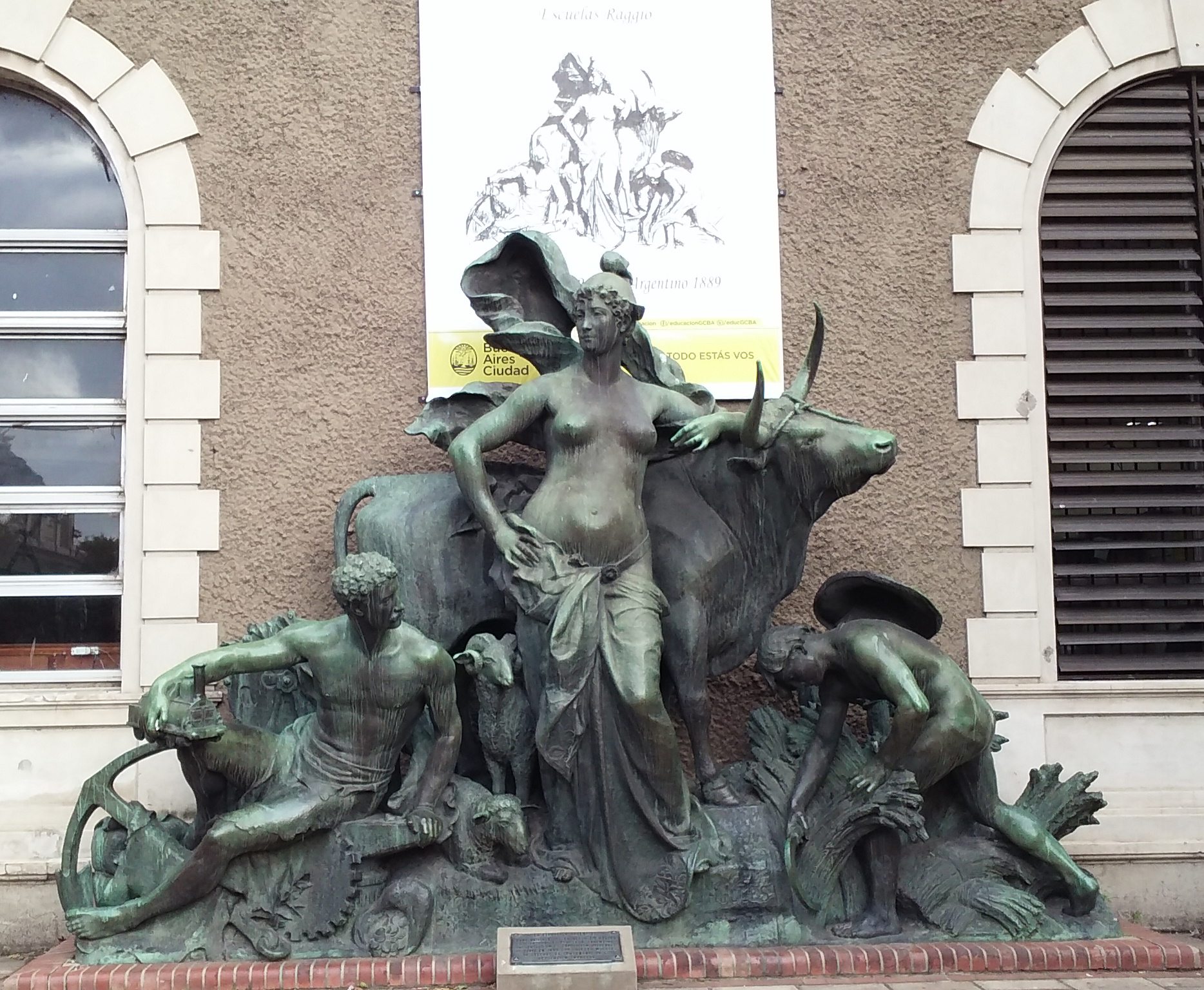
- Artist: Jean-Baptiste Hugues
- Medium: Bronze sculpture
- Location: Buenos Aires
- 34.5360°S 58.4661°W

La República Argentina (Spanish for 'The Argentine Republic') is a monumental sculpture by Jean-Baptiste Hugues, that was a central part of the Argentine Pavilion at the Universal Exhibition of Paris in 1889.

== History ==
=== The Argentine Pavilion ===
At the Paris Universal Exhibition held in 1889, 35 countries built enormous pavilions that were used by each nation to show its progress and cultural level. Each pavilion tried to represent the wealth of the participant nation. Argentina was one of the invited countries, which gave an opportunity for its political leadership to show the economic strength of a nation that had experienced major modernisation and transformation in the preceding twenty years. The Argentine Pavilion was in the Champ de Mars; a privileged place because of its nearness to the Eiffel Tower, which was the entrance to the exhibition. The Argentine Pavilion was designed in a European style, as compared to the Mexican and the Brazilian pavilions that emphasized their Latin American heritage.

To build the Argentine Pavilion, the national government delegated the task of organizing a contest to an ad hoc committee chaired by the writer Eugenio Cambaceres. A demountable construction of iron was specified so as to be able to move the pavilion to Buenos Aires after the exhibition ended. The work of construction was awarded to the renowned French architect Albert Ballu, who came second in the contest.

=== The sculpture and its maquette ===
Hugues sculpted an original work in bronze for the pavilion. The National Museum of Fine Arts conserves the original plaster model of the sculpture, measuring 84 cm x 122.3 cm x 33 cm. (Note: Museo Nacional de Bellas Artes (Buenos Aires), inv. 6695) It was given to the museum in 1946 by Ignacio Pirovano, to commemorate his mother María Rosa Lezica Alvear of Pirovano. Dr. Pirovano inherited the sculpture from his grandfather, Ricardo de Lezica y Thompson, who was a member of the Argentine commission of the Paris exhibition.

=== The relocation of the sculptures ===
After the Universal Exhibition, the Argentine delegation in Paris tried to sell the pavilion because of the precarious state of the Argentine economy after the crisis of 1890. The pavilion was made of iron, and could be easily disassembled. When there were no buyers, it was decided to bring it to Buenos Aires. Some parts were lost in a storm during the transatlantic crossing, but it arrived in Buenos Aires in acceptable condition. A bidding contest was held to see who wanted to rebuild it and exploit the concession, which was won by an Englishman who used the pavilion for various types of exhibitions. In 1910, at the centenary of the Revolution of May, the pavilion was recovered by the national government in order to place it in Plaza San Martín (San Martín square) in front of the National Museum of Fine Arts. The Pavilion was dismantled between the 1932 and 1934, and eventually sold as scrap.

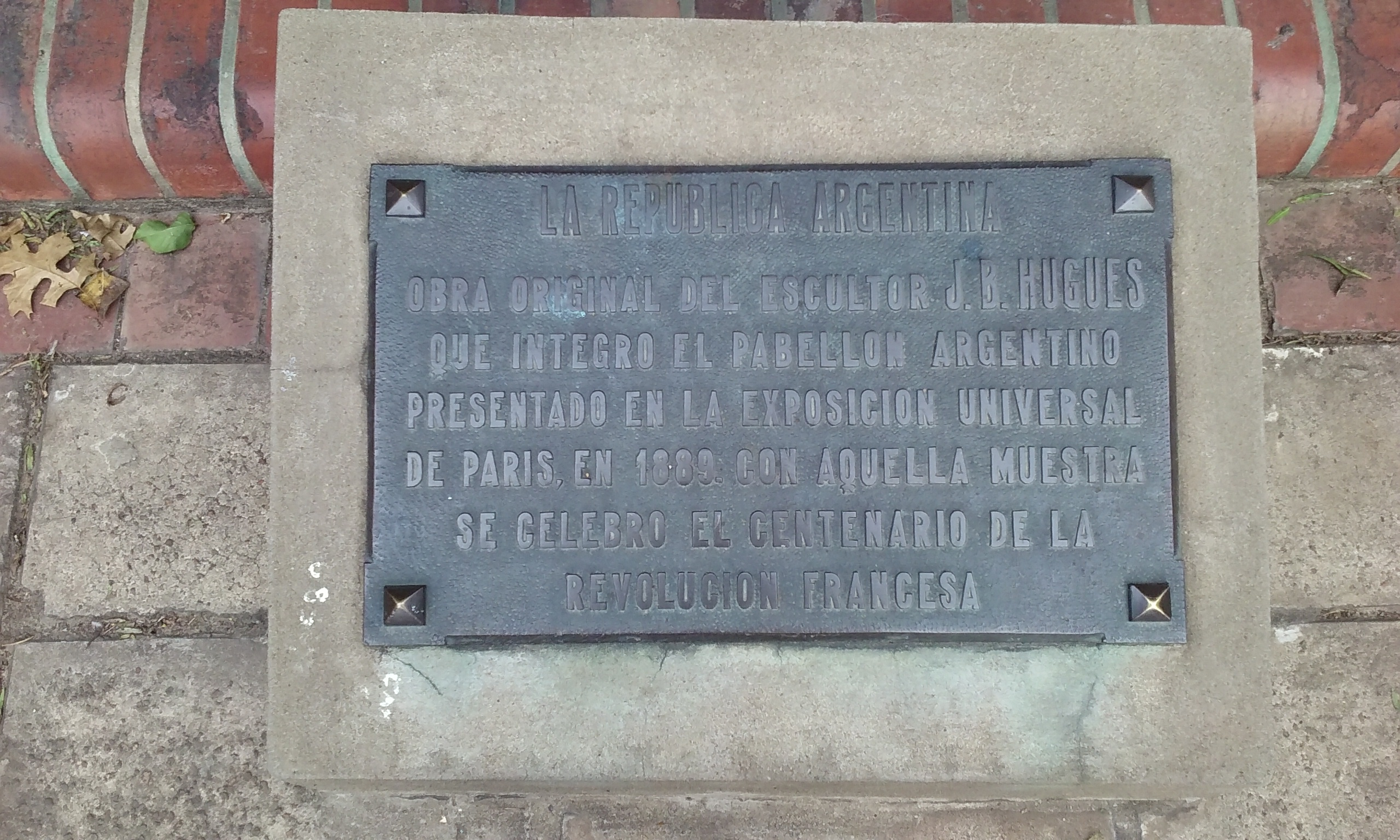
Monument plate of the sculpture at its location at the Escuela Técnica Raggio

The bronze sculptural groups that decorated the four corners of the pavilion were installed by the Buenos Aires city authorities in diverse points of the city, whilst the main sculpture was placed at its current location next to the building of the Escuela Técnica Raggio.

=== The fate of the pavilion ===
In 1997, in the neighbourhood of Mataderos, (Note: Andalgalá 1475) some remains of the Pavilion that had become part of the Fábrica Solana de Carros y Carruajes, 'Solana Factory of Cars and Carriages' were discovered. Recent investigations carried out by a group of researchers of the University of Buenos Aires Faculty of Architecture, Design and Urbanism, and another group of the Museo Archivo Tecno Educativo Lorenzo Raggio, 'museum and archive of technology and education Lorenzo Raggio', found that the former owner (Isidoro Adrets, a soldier and a blacksmith), had bought the remains of the Argentine Pavilion in 1945. The elements of the main nave of the pavilion had not been destroyed, but were buried in a sector of the Parque Tres de Febrero in the neighbourhood of Palermo. Despite this, there have been no efforts to locate and display them.

== Description ==
The sculpture is a feminine figure that personifies the Argentine Republic, with a Phrygian cap (a traditional symbol of liberty) and garments waving in the wind. At her back is a bull that symbolises the growing animal husbandry in Argentina. At its feet are two human figures: one the right that is harvesting grain (representing the agriculture that is main source of the wealth of the country) and one on the left; a man seated on an anvil between gears (that symbolize industry) holding a locomotive, personifying the progress of a modern country.
