= Argentine Bellegarde-Foureau =

Haitian educator

- Born: 1842; Haiti
- Died: 1901 (aged 58–59); Haiti
- Occupations: Educator, social reformer
- Organization: Pensionnat national des demoiselles
- Known for: Advancing education for girls in Haiti and advocacy for gender equality in education
- Term: 1880–1901
- Movement: Social reform

Argentine Bellegarde-Foureau (1842-1901) was a Haitian educator.

== Early life and education ==
Argentine Bellegarde-Foureau was born on August 2, 1842, in Arcahaie, Haiti, and was the daughter of Jean-Louis Bellegarde. She studied at Mme Isidore Boisrond's institution in Port-au-Prince, where she already showed an aptitude for teaching.

== Career ==
She was the head of the national network of the girl schools of Haiti, the Pensionnat national des demoiselles, from 1880, and are regarded to have played an important part in the education of girls in Haiti. She was also known as a vocal critic of all abuse from both the liberal and national party, and spoke for solidarity and equal education for sexes as a principle to reform society.
