= Mesorhaga =

Scientific classification
- Kingdom: Animalia
- Phylum: Arthropoda
- Class: Insecta
- Order: Diptera
- Family: Dolichopodidae
- Subfamily: Sciapodinae
- Tribe: Mesorhagini
- Genus: Mesorhaga; Schiner, 1868

Type species
- Mesorhaga tristis Schiner, 1868

Synonyms
- Aptorthus Aldrich, 1893

Genus of flies

Mesorhaga is a genus of flies in the family Dolichopodidae.

== Species ==
- Mesorhaga actites Bickel, 1994
- Mesorhaga adunca (Van Duzee, 1933)
- Mesorhaga africana Curran, 1927
- Mesorhaga albiciliata (Aldrich, 1893)
- Mesorhaga albiflabellata Parent, 1944
- Mesorhaga aurata Naglis, 2000
- Mesorhaga baadsvicki Bickel, 2007
- Mesorhaga borealis (Aldrich, 1893)
- Mesorhaga caerulea Van Duzee, 1930
- Mesorhaga canberrensis Bickel, 1994
- Mesorhaga caudata Van Duzee, 1915
- Mesorhaga chillagoensis Bickel, 1994
- Mesorhaga circumflexa Parent, 1937
- Mesorhaga clavicauda Van Duzee, 1925
- Mesorhaga cockatoo Bickel, 1994
- Mesorhaga cocori Bickel, 2007
- Mesorhaga coolumensis Bickel, 1994
- Mesorhaga danielsi Bickel, 1994
- Mesorhaga decembris Bickel, 1994
- Mesorhaga demeyeri Grichanov, 1998
- Mesorhaga didillibah Bickel, 1994
- Mesorhaga dimi Negrobov, 1984
- Mesorhaga dispar Becker, 1922
- Mesorhaga emmensis Bickel, 1994
- Mesorhaga falciunguis Bickel, 2007
- Mesorhaga flavicoma Bickel, 1994
- Mesorhaga flavipes Van Duzee, 1932
- Mesorhaga fujianensis Yang, 1995
- Mesorhaga funebris Parent, 1929
- Mesorhaga garamba Grichanov, 1999
- Mesorhaga gatesae Bickel, 1994
- Mesorhaga geoscopa Bickel, 1994
- Mesorhaga gingra Bickel, 1994
- Mesorhaga gracilis Zhu & Yang, 2011
- Mesorhaga grootaerti Yang, 1995
- Mesorhaga guangxiensis Yang, 1998
- Mesorhaga hule Bickel, 2007
- Mesorhaga isthmia Bickel, 2007
- Mesorhaga jucunda Becker, 1922
- Mesorhaga kirkspriggsi Grichanov, 2000
- Mesorhaga koongarra Bickel, 1994
- Mesorhaga lacrymans Parent, 1928
- Mesorhaga laeta Becker, 1922
- Mesorhaga lamondensis Bickel, 1994
- Mesorhaga lata Becker, 1922
- Mesorhaga limitata Becker, 1922
- Mesorhaga litoralis Grootaert & Meuffels, 1995
- Mesorhaga longipenis Bickel, 1994
- Mesorhaga longiseta Yang & Saigusa, 2001
- Mesorhaga maceveyi Bickel, 1994
- Mesorhaga mahunkai Grichanov, 1997
- Mesorhaga martius Bickel, 1994
- Mesorhaga mexicana Bickel, 2007
- Mesorhaga minatitlan Bickel, 2007
- Mesorhaga muchei Bickel, 1994
- Mesorhaga naumanni Bickel, 1994
- Mesorhaga nayaritensis Bickel, 2007
- Mesorhaga negrobovi Grichanov, 2021
- Mesorhaga nerrensis Bickel, 1994
- Mesorhaga nigripes (Aldrich, 1893)
- Mesorhaga nigrobarbata Parent, 1937
- Mesorhaga nigroviridis Becker, 1922
- Mesorhaga obscura Becker, 1922
- Mesorhaga ornatipes Van Duzee, 1932
- Mesorhaga ovalis Parent, 1932
- Mesorhaga palaearctica Negrobov, 1984
- Mesorhaga pallidicornis Van Duzee, 1925
- Mesorhaga pauliani Vanschuytbroeck, 1952
- Mesorhaga paupercula Parent, 1937
- Mesorhaga petrensis Bickel, 1994
- Mesorhaga prima Parent, 1932
- †Mesorhaga pseudolacrymans Bickel & Solórzano Kraemer, 2016
- Mesorhaga queenslandensis Bickel, 1994
- Mesorhaga saetosa Naglis, 2000
- Mesorhaga sarukhani Bickel, 2007
- Mesorhaga schneiderae Bickel, 1994
- Mesorhaga septima Becker, 1922
- Mesorhaga setosa Zhu & Yang, 2011
- Mesorhaga similis Bickel, 1994
- Mesorhaga stylata Becker, 1922
- Mesorhaga stylatoides Grootaert & Meuffels, 1995
- Mesorhaga tanzaniensis Grichanov, 2021
- Mesorhaga tarooma Bickel, 1994
- Mesorhaga terminalis Becker, 1922
- Mesorhaga tindali Bickel, 1994
- Mesorhaga toddensis Bickel, 1994
- Mesorhaga townsendi (Aldrich, 1893)
- Mesorhaga tristis Schiner, 1868
- Mesorhaga tsurikovi Grichanov, 1998
- Mesorhaga turneri Bickel, 1994
- Mesorhaga varicornis Bickel, 1994
- Mesorhaga varipes Van Duzee, 1917
- Mesorhaga villanuevi Bickel, 2007
- Mesorhaga wanbi Bickel, 1994
- Mesorhaga weiri Bickel, 1994
- Mesorhaga wirthi Bickel, 1994
- Mesorhaga xizangensis Yang, 1995
- Mesorhaga yarratt Bickel, 1994
- Mesorhaga zborowskii Bickel, 1994

Unrecognised species:

- Mesorhaga torquata Bigot, 1890
