= ARA La Argentina =

Several ships of the Argentine Navy ((in Spanish) Armada de la República Argentina) have been named La Argentina, with or without the prefix "ARA".

- La Argentina (1816), a frigate commanded by Hippolyte Bouchard in the corsair campaign 1817-1819
- La Argentina (1828), a schooner
- La Argentina (1828), a corvette
- La Argentina (1865), a barque
- ARA La Argentina (1884), a school ship in service from 1884 to 1900.
- ARA La Argentina (C-3), a light cruiser launched in 1937. She was decommissioned in 1972 and scrapped in 1974.
- ARA La Argentina (D-11), an Almirante Brown-class destroyer, launched in 1981.
