= Argentino Molinuevo =

Argentino Molinuevo can refer to:

- Argentino Molinuevo Sr. (1911-2006), Argentine Olympic equestrian
- Argentino Molinuevo Jr. (born 1945), Argentine Olympic equestrian
