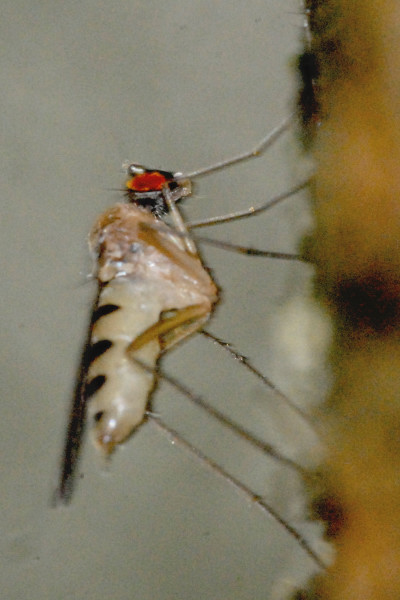
- Neurigona quadrifasciata

Scientific classification
- Kingdom: Animalia
- Phylum: Arthropoda
- Clade: Pancrustacea
- Class: Insecta
- Order: Diptera
- Family: Dolichopodidae
- Subfamily: Neurigoninae
- Tribe: Neurigonini
- Genus: Neurigona; Rondani, 1856

Type species
- Musca quadrifasciata Fabricius, 1781

Synonyms
- Neurogona Oldenberg, 1904; Saucropus Loew, 1857

= Neurigona =

Genus of flies

Neurigona is a genus of flies in the family Dolichopodidae. It is a large genus, with over 150 known species.

== Gallery ==
Neurigona quadrifasciata

== Species ==
- Neurigona abdominalis (Fallén, 1823)
- Neurigona aestiva Van Duzee, 1913
- Neurigona alajuela Naglis, 2003
- Neurigona albitarsis Naglis, 2003
- Neurigona albospinosa Van Duzee, 1913
- Neurigona aldrichi Van Duzee, 1913
- Neurigona americana Parent, 1934
- Neurigona angulata De Meijere, 1916
- Neurigona anomaloptera Negrobov, 1987
- Neurigona apicilata Lin, Wang & Ding, 2024
- Neurigona aragua Naglis, 2003
- Neurigona arcuata Van Duzee, 1913
- Neurigona argentifacies Naglis, 2003
- Neurigona australis Van Duzee, 1913
- Neurigona banksi Van Duzee, 1929
- Neurigona basalis Yang & Saigusa, 2005
- Neurigona basicurva Lin, Wang & Ding, 2024
- Neurigona bicolor Van Duzee, 1933
- Neurigona biflexa Strobl, 1909
- Neurigona bimaculata Yang & Saigusa, 2005
- Neurigona bivittata Van Duzee, 1913
- Neurigona borneoensis Parent, 1935
- Neurigona brevidigitata Lin, Wang & Ding, 2024
- Neurigona brevitibia Naglis, 2003
- Neurigona bullata Negrobov, 1987
- Neurigona californica Harmston, 1972
- Neurigona cantareira Naglis, 2003
- Neurigona carbonifer (Loew, 1870)
- Neurigona centralis Yang & Saigusa, 2001
- Neurigona chetitarsa Parent, 1926
- Neurigona ciliata Van Duzee, 1913
- Neurigona cilimanus Van Duzee, 1925
- Neurigona cilipes (Oldenberg, 1904)
- Neurigona composita Becker, 1922
- Neurigona concaviuscula Yang, 1999
- Neurigona convexa Lin, Wang & Ding, 2024
- Neurigona crinitarsis Naglis, 2003
- Neurigona dahli Becker, 1922
- Neurigona davshinica Negrobov, 1987
- Neurigona deformis Van Duzee, 1913
- Neurigona denudata Becker, 1922
- Neurigona dimidiata (Loew, 1861)
- Neurigona disjuncta Van Duzee, 1913
- Neurigona dobrogica Pârvu, 1996
- Neurigona elongata Wang in Wang, Yang & Zhang, 2019
- Neurigona erichsoni (Zetterstedt, 1843)
- Neurigona euchroma Negrobov, 1987
- Neurigona exemta Becker, 1922
- Neurigona febrilata Negrobov & Fursov, 1988
- Neurigona flava Van Duzee, 1913
- Neurigona flavella Negrobov, 1987
- Neurigona floridula Wheeler, 1899
- Neurigona fuscalaris Harmston, 1968
- Neurigona fuscicosta Robinson, 1975
- Neurigona gemina Becker, 1922
- Neurigona georgiana Harmston & Knowlton, 1963
- Neurigona grisea Parent, 1944
- Neurigona grossa Negrobov, 1987
- Neurigona grossicauda Van Duzee, 1931
- Neurigona guanacasta Naglis, 2003
- Neurigona guangdongensis Wang, Yang & Grootaert, 2007
- Neurigona guangxiensis Yang, 1999
- Neurigona guizhouensis Wang, Yang & Grootaert, 2007
- Neurigona hachaensis Naglis, 2003
- Neurigona hainana Wang, Chen & Yang, 2010
- Neurigona hauseri Wang in Wang, Yang & Zhang, 2019
- Neurigona helva Negrobov & Tsurikov, 1990
- Neurigona henana Wang, Yang & Grootaert, 2007
- Neurigona huanglianshana Lin, Wang & Ding, 2024
- Neurigona jacobsoni Hollis, 1964
- Neurigona jiangsuensis Wang, Yang & Grootaert, 2007
- Neurigona kasparyani Negrobov, 1987
- Neurigona lamellata Naglis, 2003
- Neurigona latifacies Naglis, 2003
- Neurigona lenae Capellari, 2013
- Neurigona lienosa Wheeler, 1899
- Neurigona limonensis Naglis, 2003
- Neurigona lineata (Oldenberg, 1904)
- Neurigona lobata Parent, 1935
- Neurigona longipalpa Naglis, 2003
- Neurigona longipes Becker, 1918
- Neurigona longiseta Wang in Wang, Yang & Zhang, 2019
- Neurigona longitarsis Naglis, 2003
- Neurigona lopesi Silva, Capellari & Oliveira, 2022
- Neurigona maculata Van Duzee, 1913
- Neurigona maculosa Naglis, 2003
- Neurigona magnipalpa Naglis, 2003
- Neurigona manauara Capellari, 2013
- Neurigona melini Frey, 1928
- Neurigona meironensis Grichanov, 2010
- Neurigona micra Naglis, 2003
- Neurigona micropyga Negrobov, 1987
- Neurigona mongolensis Negrobov & Fursov, 1985
- Neurigona montebello Naglis, 2003
- Neurigona nervosa Naglis, 2003
- Neurigona nigrimanus Van Duzee, 1930
- Neurigona nigritibialis Robinson, 1964
- Neurigona ninae Negrobov, 1987
- Neurigona nitida Van Duzee, 1913
- Neurigona nubifera (Loew, 1869)
- Neurigona obscurata Naglis, 2003
- Neurigona orbicularis Becker, 1922
- Neurigona ornata Van Duzee, 1930
- Neurigona ornatipes Parent, 1934
- Neurigona pallida (Fallén, 1823)
- Neurigona papaveroi Silva, Capellari & Oliveira, 2022
- Neurigona parchamii Grichanov & Gilasian, 2023
- Neurigona pectinata Becker, 1922
- Neurigona pectinulata Parent, 1935
- Neurigona pectoralis Van Duzee, 1913
- Neurigona perbrevis Van Duzee, 1913
- Neurigona perplexa Van Duzee, 1913
- Neurigona persiana Pollet & Kazerani, 2022
- Neurigona pitilla Naglis, 2003
- Neurigona planipes Van Duzee, 1925
- Neurigona plumitarsis Naglis, 2003
- Neurigona pressitarsis Naglis, 2003
- Neurigona procera Naglis, 2003
- Neurigona pseudobanksi Naglis, 2003
- Neurigona pseudolongipes Negrobov, 1987
- Neurigona pullata Negrobov & Fursov, 1988
- Neurigona punctifera Becker, 1907
- Neurigona purulha Naglis, 2003
- Neurigona qingchengshana Yang & Saigusa, 2001
- Neurigona quadrifasciata (Fabricius, 1781)
- Neurigona quadrimaculata Lin, Wang & Ding, 2024
- Neurigona rubella (Loew, 1861)
- Neurigona scutitarsis Robinson, 1970
- Neurigona semilata Negrobov & Fursov, 1988
- Neurigona sergii Negrobov & Fursov, 1988
- Neurigona shaanxiensis Yang & Saigusa, 2005
- Neurigona shennongjiana Yang, 1999
- Neurigona sichuana Wang, Chen & Yang, 2010
- Neurigona signata Parent, 1932
- Neurigona signifer Aldrich, 1896
- Neurigona sirena Naglis, 2003
- Neurigona smithi Robinson, 1970
- Neurigona solodovnikovi Grichanov, 2010
- Neurigona spiculifera Robinson, 1970
- Neurigona squamifera Parent, 1935
- Neurigona starki Naglis, 2003
- Neurigona subcilipes Negrobov & Fursov, 1988
- Neurigona subnervosa Naglis, 2003
- Neurigona suturalis (Fallén, 1823)
- Neurigona tarsalis Van Duzee, 1913
- Neurigona tatjanae Negrobov, 1987
- Neurigona tatumbia Naglis, 2003
- Neurigona temasek Grootaert & Foo, 2019
- Neurigona tenuicauda Naglis, 2003
- Neurigona tenuis (Loew, 1864)
- Neurigona terminalis Van Duzee, 1925
- Neurigona timahensis Grootaert & Foo, 2019
- Neurigona tingua Silva, Capellari & Oliveira, 2022
- Neurigona torrida Harmston, 1951
- Neurigona transversa Van Duzee, 1913
- Neurigona tridens Van Duzee, 1913
- Neurigona unicalcarata Negrobov & Fursov, 1988
- Neurigona unicinata Negrobov & Fursov, 1988
- Neurigona unicolor Oldenberg, 1916
- Neurigona uralensis Becker, 1918
- Neurigona valgusa Harmston & Rapp, 1968
- Neurigona ventralis Yang & Saigusa, 2005
- Neurigona ventriprocessa Lin, Wang & Ding, 2024
- Neurigona wui Wang, Yang & Grootaert, 2007
- Neurigona xiaolongmensis Wang, Yang & Grootaert, 2007
- Neurigona xiangshana Yang, 1999
- Neurigona xizangensis Yang, 1999
- Neurigona xui Zhang, Yang & Grootaert, 2003
- Neurigona yacambo Naglis, 2003
- Neurigona yaoi Wang, Chen & Yang, 2010
- Neurigona yunnana Wang, Yang & Grootaert, 2007
- Neurigona zhangae Wang, Yang & Grootaert, 2006
- Neurigona zhejiangensis Yang, 1999
- Neurigona zionensis Harmston & Knowlton, 1942

The following are regarded as nomina dubia:

- Neurigona brasiliensis (Schiner, 1868)
- Neurigona cinereicollis (Van der Wulp, 1888)
- Neurigona derelicta Parent, 1928
- Neurigona lamprostetha (Philippi, 1865)
