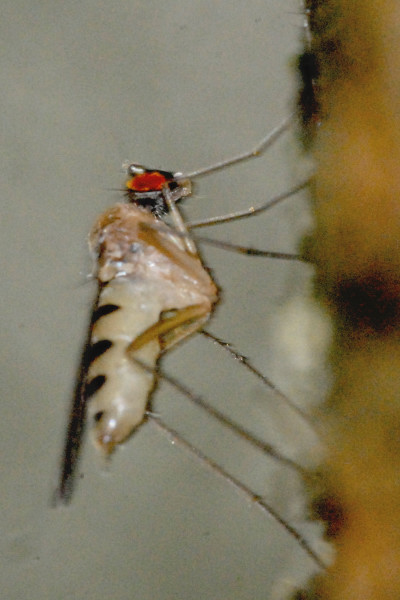
- Neurigona quadrifasciata

Scientific classification
- Kingdom: Animalia
- Phylum: Arthropoda
- Clade: Pancrustacea
- Class: Insecta
- Order: Diptera
- Family: Dolichopodidae
- Subfamily: Neurigoninae; Aldrich, 1905

Genera
- see text

Synonyms
- Coeloglutinae Negrobov, 1986

= Neurigoninae =

Subfamily of flies

Neurigoninae is a subfamily of flies in the family Dolichopodidae.

== Genera ==
- Tribe Coeloglutini Negrobov, 1986
  - Coeloglutus Aldrich, 1896
  - Mberu Capellari & Amorim, 2011
  - Neotonnoiria Robinson, 1970
  - Paracoeloglutus Naglis, 2001
- Tribe Dactylomyiini Naglis, 2002
  - Argentinia Parent, 1931
  - Dactylomyia Aldrich, 1894
  - Naglisia Quevedo, Capellari & Lamas, 2024
  - Systenoides Naglis, 2002
- Tribe Neurigonini Aldrich, 1905
  - Arachnomyia White, 1916
  - Bickelomyia Naglis, 2002
  - Halteriphorus Parent, 1933
  - Naticornus Olejníček, 2005
  - Neurigona Rondani, 1856
  - Oncopygius Mik, 1866
  - Viridigona Naglis, 2003
