= List of Sciapus species =

This is a list of 85 species in Sciapus, a genus of long-legged flies in the family Dolichopodidae.

== Sciapus species ==
- Sciapus aberrans Becker, 1918
- Sciapus adana Grichanov & Negrobov, 2014
- Sciapus adumbratus (Becker, 1902)
- Sciapus albifrons (Meigen, 1830)
- Sciapus albovittatus Strobl, 1909
- Sciapus algirus Macquart, 1849
- Sciapus arctus Becker, 1922
- Sciapus basarukini Grichanov & Selivanova, 2022
- Sciapus basavandae Grichanov & Gilasian, 2023
- Sciapus basilicus Meuffels & Grootaert, 1990
- Sciapus bellus (Loew, 1873)
- Sciapus calceolatus (Loew, 1859)
- Sciapus canariensis Grichanov & Negrobov, 2014
- Sciapus collucens (Walker, 1856)
- †Sciapus combaluzieri Timon-David, 1944
- Sciapus contristans (Wiedemann, 1817)
- Sciapus corsicanus Grichanov & Negrobov, 2014
- Sciapus costae (Mik, 1890)
- Sciapus delicatus (Walker, 1849)
- Sciapus discretus Parent, 1926
- Sciapus dytei Negrobov, Maslova & Selivanova, 2012
- Sciapus endrodyi Grichanov, 1997
- †Sciapus erasmius Meuffels & Grootaert, 1999
- Sciapus euchromus (Loew, 1857)
- Sciapus euzonus (Loew, 1859)
- Sciapus evanidus Bezzi, 1898
- Sciapus filipes (Loew, 1861)
- Sciapus flavicinctus (Loew, 1857)
- Sciapus flexicornis Parent, 1944
- Sciapus frater (Parent, 1927)
- Sciapus freidbergi Grichanov & Negrobov, 2014
- Sciapus glaucescens (Loew, 1856)
- Sciapus gracilipes (Loew, 1871)
- Sciapus heteropygus Parent, 1926
- Sciapus hirtiventris (De Meijere, 1924)
- Sciapus holoxanthos Parent, 1926
- Sciapus incognitus Negrobov & Shamshev, 1986
- Sciapus iranicus Grichanov & Negrobov, 2014
- Sciapus judaeus Parent, 1932
- Sciapus khuzestanicus Grichanov & Gilasian, 2023
- Sciapus laetus (Meigen, 1838)
- Sciapus lesinensis (Mik, 1889)
- Sciapus litoralis Grichanov & Negrobov, 2014
- Sciapus lobipes (Meigen, 1824)
- Sciapus longimanus Becker, 1907
- Sciapus longitarsis Grichanov & Negrobov, 2014
- Sciapus longulus (Fallén, 1823)
- Sciapus maritimus Becker, 1918
- Sciapus matilei Negrobov, 1973
- Sciapus maurus Parent, 1930
- Sciapus medvedevi Negrobov & Selivanova, 2009
- Sciapus mitis Parent, 1925
- Sciapus montium Becker, 1908
- Sciapus nebraskaensis (Harmston & Rapp, 1968)
- Sciapus negrobovi Naglis & Bartak, 2015
- Sciapus nervosus (Lehmann, 1822)
- Sciapus nigricornis (Loew, 1869)
- Sciapus occidasiaticus Grichanov & Negrobov, 2014
- Sciapus oldenbergi Parent, 1932
- Sciapus opacus (Loew, 1866)
- Sciapus pallens (Wiedemann, 1830)
- Sciapus palmipes Collin, 1966
- Sciapus paradoxus Negrobov & Shamshev, 1986
  - Sciapus paradoxus paradoxus Negrobov & Shamshev, 1986
  - Sciapus paradoxus sachalinensis Negrobov & Shamshev, 1986
- Sciapus platypterus (Fabricius, 1805)
- Sciapus polozhentsevi Negrobov, 1977
- Sciapus pseudobellus Grichanov & Negrobov, 2014
- Sciapus richterae Negrobov & Grichanov, 2010
- Sciapus roderi Parent, 1929
- †Sciapus rottensis Statz, 1940
- Sciapus rutilus (Van Duzee, 1914)
- Sciapus sibiricus Negrobov & Shamshev, 1986
- Sciapus spiniger (Zetterstedt, 1859)
- Sciapus spinosus Parent, 1929
- Sciapus subvicinus Grichanov, 2007
- Sciapus sylvaticus Becker, 1907
- Sciapus talebii Kazerani & Grichanov in Kazerani, Khaghaninia, Talebi & Grichanov, 2015
- Sciapus tener (Loew, 1862)
- Sciapus tenuinervis (Loew, 1857)
- Sciapus vanharteni Naglis & Bickel, 2017
- Sciapus venetus Meuffels, 1977
- Sciapus vicinus Parent, 1925
- Sciapus vladimiri Grichanov & Negrobov, 2014
- Sciapus wiedemanni (Fallen, 1823)
- Sciapus zewoiensus Tang, Zhu & Yang, 2019
- Sciapus zonatulus (Zetterstedt, 1843)

The following additional species are listed for the genus by online databases:

- Sciapus ukrainensis Pollet, 2003^{g}

Unrecognised species:

- Sciapus aequalis Becker, 1922
- Sciapus clarus (Walker, 1857)
- Sciapus derelictus (Walker, 1856)
- Sciapus dialithus (Bigot, 1890)
- Sciapus illiciens (Walker, 1856)
- Sciapus leiopus (Doleschall, 1856)^{c g}
- Sciapus nitidus (Walker, 1852)
- Sciapus palmetorum (Doleschall, 1858)^{c g}
- Sciapus pellucens (De Meijere, 1913)^{c g}
- Sciapus piger Becker, 1922
- Sciapus posticus (Walker, 1857)
- Sciapus subnotatus (Walker, 1857)
- Sciapus tardus Becker, 1922
- Sciapus viridicollis (Frey, 1917)^{c g}

Synonyms:

- Sciapus adhaerens Becker, 1922:^{c g} Moved to Heteropsilopus
- Sciapus aestimatus (Walker, 1859):^{c g} Moved to Chrysosoma
- Sciapus albifacies Parent, 1931:^{c g} Moved to Amblypsilopus
- Sciapus albimanus Becker, 1918: Synonym of Sciapus algirus Macquart, 1849
- †Sciapus amabilis Statz, 1940: Renamed to Sciapus erasmius Meuffels & Grootaert, 1999
- Sciapus amplicaudatus (Lamb, 1922):^{c g} Moved to Mascaromyia
- Sciapus angelicus Parent, 1930: Synonym of Amblypsilopus unicinctus (Van Duzee, 1927)
- Sciapus angustifrons Parent, 1929:^{c g} Moved to Amblypsilopus
- Sciapus antennatus Becker, 1922: Moved to Amblypsilopus
- Sciapus arduus Parent, 1936:^{c g} Moved to Chrysosoma
- Sciapus auresi Vaillant, 1952:^{c g} Var. of Sciapus euzonus (Loew, 1859)
- Sciapus aurichalceus Becker, 1922: Moved to Amblypsilopus
- Sciapus australensis (Schiner, 1868):^{c g} Moved to Negrobovia
- Sciapus badjavensis Dyte, 1975:^{c g} Synonym of Amblypsilopus flavipes (De Meijere, 1910)
- Sciapus barbipalpis Parent, 1937:^{c g} Synonym of Amblypsilopus lenga (Curran, 1929)
- Sciapus basilewskyi Vanschuytbroeck, 1960:^{c g} Moved to Amblypsilopus
- Sciapus bellimanus (Van Duzee, 1927):^{c g} Moved to Amblypsilopus
- Sciapus bicalcaratus Parent, 1933:^{c g} Moved to Ethiosciapus
- Sciapus bilobatus (Lamb, 1922):^{c g} Moved to Ethiosciapus
- Sciapus bilobus (Van Duzee, 1929):^{c g} Moved to Amblypsilopus
- Sciapus bipectinatus Parent, 1934:^{c g} Moved to Amblypsilopus
- Sciapus bredini Robinson, 1975: Moved to Amblypsilopus
- Sciapus brevitarsis Parent, 1932:^{c g} Synonym of Amblypsilopus flaviappendiculatus (De Meijere, 1910)
- Sciapus brionii (Becker, 1918):^{c g} Synonym of Sciapus glaucescens (Loew, 1856)
- Sciapus californicus Steyskal, 1966:^{i} Moved to Amblypsilopus
- Sciapus capillimanus (Enderlein, 1912):^{c g} Moved to Amblypsilopus
- Sciapus carboneus Parent, 1932:^{c g} Synonym of Krakatauia anthracoides (Van der Wulp, 1896)
- Sciapus castus (Loew, 1866): Moved to Amblypsilopus
- Sciapus cilicostatus (Van Duzee, 1927):^{c g} Moved to Amblypsilopus
- Sciapus cilipennis (Aldrich, 1901):^{c g} Moved to Amblypsilopus
- Sciapus coalescens Parent, 1934:^{c g} Synonym of Bickeliolus haemorhoidalis (Becker, 1923)
- Sciapus connexus (Walker, 1835):^{i} Moved to Austrosciapus
- Sciapus cuthbertsoni Parent, 1937:^{c g} Moved to Amblypsilopus
- Sciapus decoripes Robinson, 1975: Moved to Amblypsilopus
- Sciapus delectabilis Parent, 1932:^{c g} Moved to Amblypsilopus
- Sciapus difficilis (Parent, 1932):^{c g} Moved to Narrabeenia
- Sciapus digitatus Van Duzee, 1914:^{c g} Synonym of Condylostylus quadricolor (Walker, 1849)
- Sciapus dimidiatus (Loew, 1862): Moved to Amblypsilopus
- Sciapus dolichoenemis (Frey, 1925):^{c g} Synonym of Amblypsilopus flaviappendiculatus (De Meijere, 1910)
- Sciapus duplicatus Parent, 1932:^{c g} Moved to Mascaromyia
- Sciapus elegans (Walker, 1852): Moved to Amblypsilopus
- Sciapus ellisi Hollis, 1964:^{c g} Moved to Amblypsilopus
- Sciapus eutarsus Schiner, 1860: Synonym of Sciapus euzonus (Loew, 1859)
- Sciapus evulgatus Becker, 1922: Moved to Krakatauia
- Sciapus exarmatus Parent, 1933:^{c g} Moved to Ethiosciapus
- Sciapus eximius (Costa, 1886): Renamed to Sciapus costae (Mik, 1890)
- Sciapus exul (Parent, 1932):^{c g} Moved to Amblypsilopus
- Sciapus filitarsis Parent, 1935:^{c g} Moved to Amblypsilopus
- Sciapus flabellifer Becker, 1923: Moved to Amblypsilopus
- Sciapus flagellaris (Frey, 1925):^{c g} Moved to Amblypsilopus
- Sciapus flaviannulatus (Van Duzee, 1929):^{c g} Synonym of Amblypsilopus unicinctus (Van Duzee, 1927)
- Sciapus flaviappendiculatus (De Meijere, 1910):^{c g} Moved to Amblypsilopus
- Sciapus flavicornis (Aldrich, 1896):^{c g} Moved to Amblypsilopus
- Sciapus flavidus (Aldrich, 1896):^{c g} Moved to Amblypsilopus
- Sciapus flavipes (De Meijere, 1910):^{c g} Moved to Amblypsilopus
- Sciapus flaviventris Bezzi, 1905: Synonym of Ethiosciapus flavirostris (Loew, 1858)
- Sciapus flavomaculatus Ringdahl, 1949: Synonym of Sciapus maritimus Becker, 1918
- Sciapus flexus Loew, 1869: Synonym of Sciapus contristans (Wiedemann, 1817)
- Sciapus floridanus Harmston, 1971:^{i} Moved to Amblypsilopus
- Sciapus fruticosus Becker, 1922: Moved to Amblypsilopus
- Sciapus fulgens von Roser, 1840: Synonym of Sciapus laetus (Meigen, 1838)
- Sciapus fuscinervis (Van Duzee, 1926):^{i} Moved to Amblypsilopus
- Sciapus gemmatus (Walker, 1849):^{c g} Moved to Parentia
- Sciapus gilvipes (Enderlein, 1912):^{c} Moved to Amblypsilopus
- Sciapus grandicaudatus (Lamb, 1922):^{c g} Moved to Mascaromyia
- Sciapus gratiosus Becker, 1922: Synonym of Austrosciapus connexus (Walker, 1835)
- Sciapus gravipes Becker, 1922: Moved to Amblypsilopus
- Sciapus haemorhoidalis Becker, 1923: Moved to Bickeliolus
- Sciapus inaequalis (Van Duzee, 1927):^{c g} Moved to Amblypsilopus
- Sciapus indistinctus (Lamb, 1922):^{c g} Moved to Mascaromyia
- Sciapus infans Becker, 1922: Moved to Amblypsilopus
- Sciapus inflexus Becker, 1923: Moved to Ethiosciapus
- Sciapus infumatus (Aldrich, 1901):^{i} Moved to Amblypsilopus
- Sciapus ingruo (Harris, 1780):^{c g} Synonym of Sciapus platypterus (Fabricius, 1805)
- Sciapus innoxius Parent, 1934: Synonym of Amblypsilopus cilipennis (Aldrich, 1901)
- Sciapus integer Becker, 1923: Moved to Ethiosciapus
- Sciapus interdictus Becker, 1922: Moved to Amblypsilopus
- Sciapus lamellatus Parent, 1935:^{c g} Moved to Bickeliolus
- Sciapus latifacies (Van Duzee, 1934):^{c} Moved to Amblypsilopus
- Sciapus latilamellatus Parent, 1934:^{c g} Moved to Amblypsilopus
- Sciapus latitarsis Becker, 1922: Moved to Condylostylus
- Sciapus lectus Becker, 1922: Synonym of Austrosciapus discretifasciatus (Macquart, 1849)
- Sciapus lenga Curran, 1929: Moved to Amblypsilopus
- Sciapus longipes (Van Duzee, 1929):^{c g} Moved to Amblypsilopus
- Sciapus luteus Robinson, 1975: Moved to Amblypsilopus
- Sciapus macrodactylus Becker, 1918: Synonym of Sciapus evanidus Bezzi, 1898
- Sciapus macula (Wiedemann, 1830): Moved to Amblypsilopus
- Sciapus magnicaudatus (Lamb, 1922):^{c g} Moved to Mascaromyia
- Sciapus mauritiensis Parent, 1939:^{c g} Moved to Mascaromyia
- Sciapus medianus (Becker, 1922):^{c g} Moved to Amblypsilopus
- Sciapus mediterraneus Bulli & Negrobov, 1987:^{c g} Renamed to Sciapus subvicinus Grichanov, 2007
- Sciapus mexicanus (Aldrich, 1901):^{c g} Moved to Amblypsilopus
- Sciapus mutatus Becker, 1922:^{g} Moved to Amblypsilopus
- Sciapus nanus Parent, 1929:^{c g} Moved to Amblypsilopus
- Sciapus neoparvus Dyte, 1975:^{c g} Moved to Amblypsilopus
- Sciapus nigrimanus Van Duzee, 1914:^{c g} Moved to Amblypsilopus
- Sciapus nitidifacies Parent, 1934:^{c g} Moved to Krakatauia
- Sciapus noditarsis Becker, 1922: Moved to Amblypsilopus
- Sciapus nubilipennis (Van Duzee, 1927):^{c g} Synonym of Amblypsilopus macula (Wiedemann, 1830)
- Sciapus occultus (Santos Abreu, 1929):^{c g} Var. of Sciapus glaucescens (Loew, 1856)
- Sciapus oldroydi Haider, 1957:^{c g} Moved to Amblypsilopus (unrecognised)
- Sciapus oscillans Parent, 1935:^{c g} Moved to Amblypsilopus
- Sciapus paracarboneus Hollis, 1964:^{c g} Moved to Krakatauia
- Sciapus parrai Milward de Azevedo, 1985:^{c g} Moved to Amblypsilopus
- Sciapus parvus Van Duzee, 1933:^{c g} Moved to Amblypsilopus
- Sciapus pectinatus (De Meijere, 1910):^{c g} Moved to Amblypsilopus
- Sciapus pectoralis Van Duzee, 1931: Synonym of Amblypsilopus parvus (Van Duzee, 1933)
- Sciapus pediformis Becker, 1922: Moved to Amblypsilopus
- Sciapus penicillatus Becker, 1922: Moved to Amblypsilopus
- Sciapus peringueyi Curran, 1926: Synonym of Amblypsilopus rosaceus (Wiedemann, 1824)
- Sciapus planipes (Van Duzee, 1929):^{c g} Moved to Amblypsilopus
- Sciapus pollicifer (Lamb, 1922):^{c g} Moved to Mascaromyia
- Sciapus pollinosus Van Duzee, 1915:^{i} Moved to Amblypsilopus
- Sciapus praecipuus Milward de Azevedo, 1985:^{c g} Moved to Amblypsilopus
- Sciapus pressipes Parent, 1929:^{i} Synonym of Krakatauia evulgata (Becker, 1922)
- Sciapus prolectans (Walker, 1856): Moved to Chrysosoma (unrecognised)
- Sciapus pruinosus Coquillett, 1904:^{i} Moved to Condylostylus
- Sciapus psittacinus (Loew, 1861):^{i} Moved to Amblypsilopus
- Sciapus rectus (Wiedemann, 1830): Moved to Krakatauia
- Sciapus rectangularis Parent, 1937:^{c g} Moved to Amblypsilopus
- Sciapus renschi Parent, 1932:^{c g} Moved to Amblypsilopus
- Sciapus restrictus (Hutton, 1901):^{c g} Moved to Parentia
- Sciapus rezendei Milward de Azevedo, 1985:^{c g} Moved to Amblypsilopus
- Sciapus rosaceus (Wiedemann, 1824):^{c g} Moved to Amblypsilopus
- Sciapus rotundiceps (Aldrich, 1904):^{i} Moved to Amblypsilopus
- Sciapus sachalinensis Negrobov & Shamshev, 1986:^{c g} Subspecies of Sciapus paradoxus Negrobov & Shamshev, 1986
- Sciapus scintillans (Loew, 1861):^{i} Moved to Amblypsilopus
- Sciapus sericeus (De Meijere, 1913):^{c g} Moved to Krakatauia
- Sciapus setifrons Parent, 1937:^{c g} Synonym of Ethiosciapus bicalcaratus (Parent, 1933)
- Sciapus sordidus (Parent, 1928):^{c g} Moved to Dytomyia
- Sciapus spinimanus (Van Duzee, 1927):^{c g} Synonym of Amblypsilopus bellimanus (Van Duzee, 1927)
- Sciapus striaticollis Becker, 1922: Moved to Amblypsilopus
- Sciapus stuckenbergi Vanschuytbroeck, 1957:^{c g} Moved to Amblypsilopus
- Sciapus subfascipennis Curran, 1926: Moved to Amblypsilopus
- Sciapus subtilis Becker, 1924: Moved to Amblypsilopus
- Sciapus sudanensis Parent, 1939:^{c g} Moved to Amblypsilopus
- Sciapus svenhedini Parent, 1936:^{c g} Moved to Amblypsilopus
- Sciapus tabulina Becker, 1922: Moved to Krakatauia
- Sciapus tenuicauda Parent, 1936:^{c g} Moved to Amblypsilopus
- Sciapus trahens (Frey, 1925):^{c g} Moved to Amblypsilopus
- Sciapus trisetosus Van Duzee, 1932:^{i g} Synonym of Condylostylus scaber (Loew, 1861)
- Sciapus tropicalis Parent, 1933:^{c g} Moved to Amblypsilopus
- Sciapus turbidus Becker, 1922: Moved to Amblypsilopus
- Sciapus unicoiensis Robinson, 1964:^{i} Moved to Amblypsilopus
- Sciapus unifasciatus (Say, 1823):^{i} Moved to Amblypsilopus
- Sciapus unitus Parent, 1928: Synonym of Krakatauia recta (Wiedemann, 1830)
- Sciapus vagabundus Bezzi & Lamb, 1926^{c g} Moved to Mascaromyia
- Sciapus variabilis (De Meijere, 1913):^{c g} Moved to Amblypsilopus
- Sciapus variegatus (Loew, 1861):^{i} Moved to Amblypsilopus
- Sciapus vialis (Raddatz, 1873):^{c g} Synonym of Sciapus contristans (Wiedemann, 1817)
- Sciapus villeneuvei Parent, 1927: Renamed to Amblypsilopus josephi Meuffels & Grootaert, 1999
- Sciapus viridivittatus (Robinson, 1960):^{i} Synonym of Amblypsilopus dorsalis (Loew, 1866)
- Sciapus zucchii Milward de Azevedo, 1885:^{c g} Moved to Amblypsilopus

Data sources: i = ITIS, c = Catalogue of Life, g = GBIF, b = Bugguide.net
