= Abbemyia taree =

Scientific classification
- Kingdom: Animalia
- Phylum: Arthropoda
- Clade: Pancrustacea
- Class: Insecta
- Order: Diptera
- Family: Dolichopodidae
- Subfamily: Sciapodinae
- Tribe: Chrysosomatini
- Genus: Abbemyia
- Species: A. taree

Binomial name
- Abbemyia taree Bickel, 1994

Species of fly

Abbemyia taree is a species of fly in the family Dolichopodidae. It was described by Daniel J. Bickel in 1994 in his revision of Australian Sciapodinae.

== Distribution ==
Abbemyia taree is known from Australia, where it has been recorded from New South Wales.
