= Abbemyia baylaci =

Scientific classification
- Kingdom: Animalia
- Phylum: Arthropoda
- Clade: Pancrustacea
- Class: Insecta
- Order: Diptera
- Family: Dolichopodidae
- Subfamily: Sciapodinae
- Tribe: Chrysosomatini
- Genus: Abbemyia
- Species: A. baylaci

Binomial name
- Abbemyia baylaci Bickel, 2002

Species of fly

Abbemyia baylaci is a species of fly in the family Dolichopodidae. It was described by Daniel J. Bickel in 2002 in a taxonomic treatment of the Sciapodinae of New Caledonia.

== Distribution ==
Abbemyia baylaci is known from New Caledonia.
