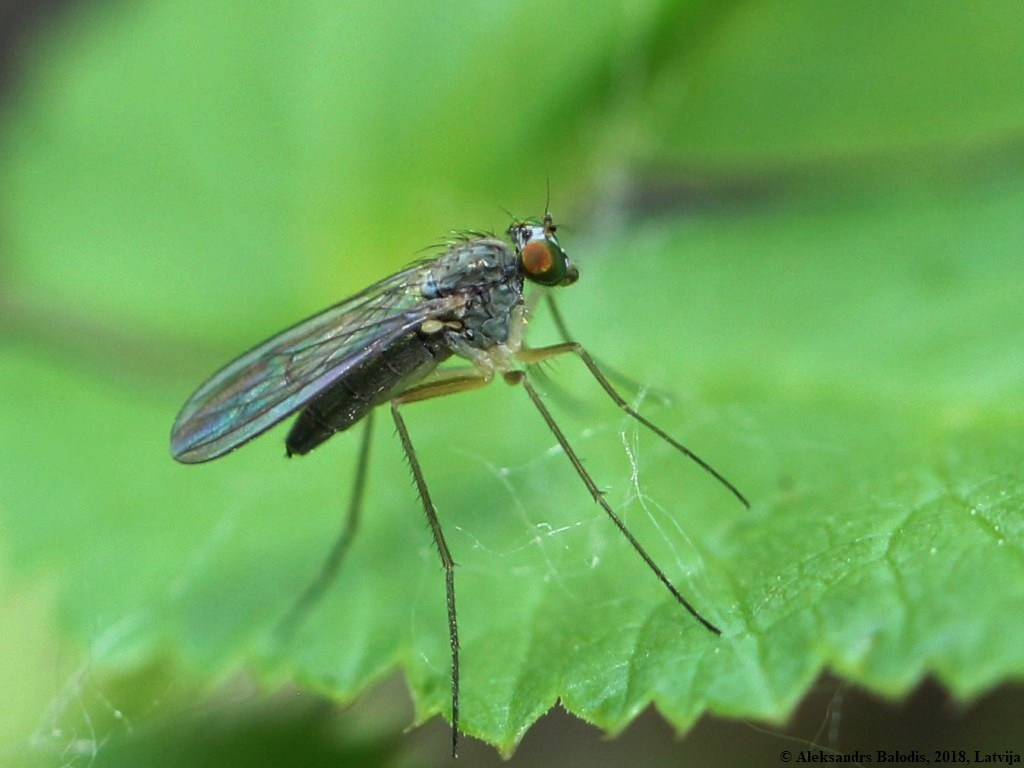
- Sciapus contristans

Scientific classification
- Domain: Eukaryota
- Kingdom: Animalia
- Phylum: Arthropoda
- Class: Insecta
- Order: Diptera
- Family: Dolichopodidae
- Subfamily: Sciapodinae
- Tribe: Sciapodini
- Genus: Sciapus
- Species: S. contristans

Binomial name
- Sciapus contristans (Wiedemann, 1817)

Synonyms
- Dolichopus contristans Wiedemann, 1817; Psilopus regalis Meigen, 1824; Sciapus flexus Loew, 1869; Sciapus vialis Raddatz, 1873; Sciapus loewi Becker, 1902

= Sciapus contristans =

Species of fly

Sciapus contristans is a species of long-legged fly in the family Dolichopodidae.
