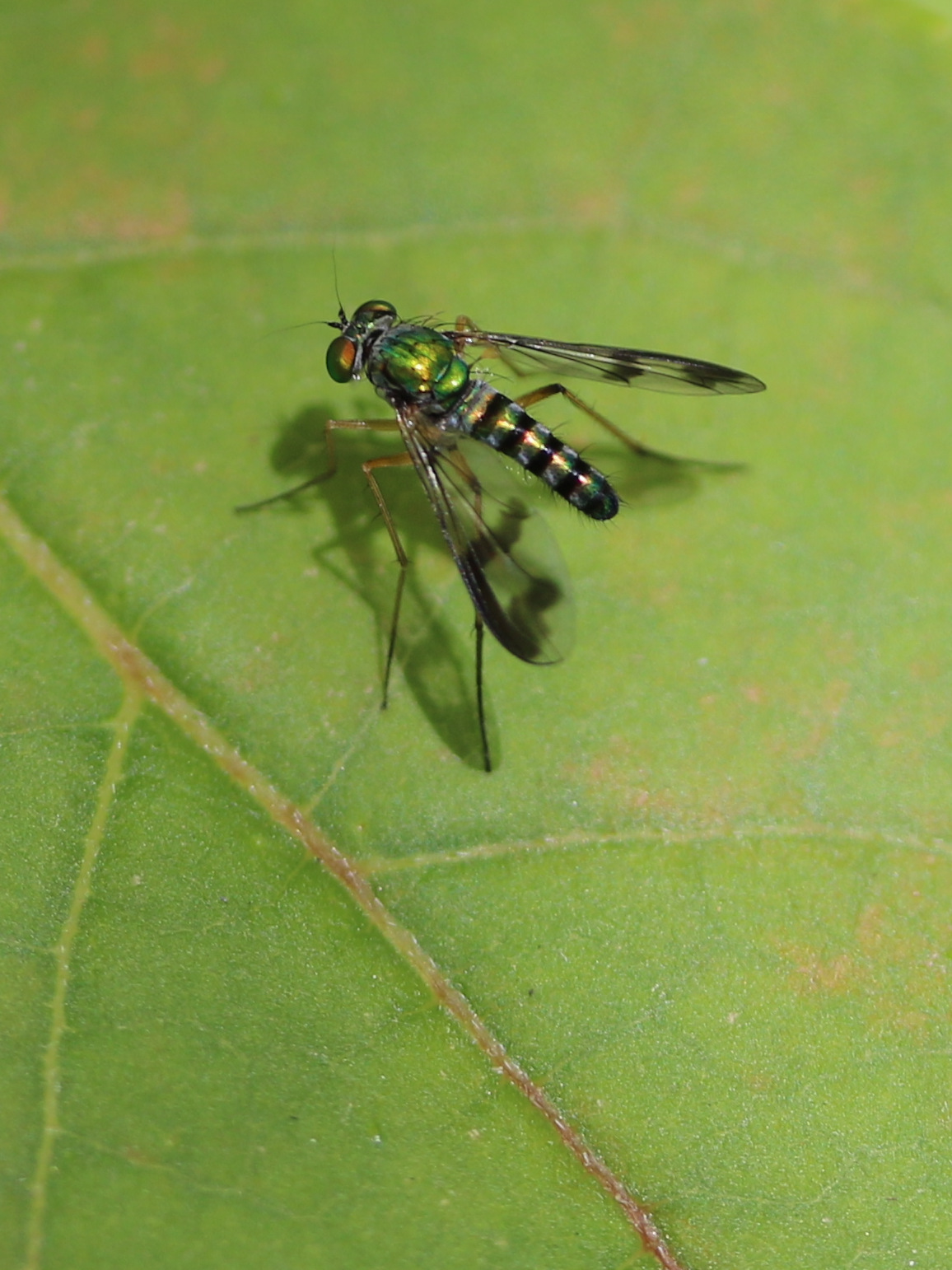

Scientific classification
- Kingdom: Animalia
- Phylum: Arthropoda
- Clade: Pancrustacea
- Class: Insecta
- Order: Diptera
- Family: Dolichopodidae
- Subfamily: Sciapodinae
- Tribe: Chrysosomatini
- Genus: Austrosciapus
- Species: A. connexus

Binomial name
- Austrosciapus connexus Walker 1835

= Austrosciapus connexus =

Green long-legged fly

Australian species of insect

Austrosciapus connexus (the green long-legged fly) is a species of long-legged fly in the family Dolichopodidae. It is found in the south-west corner as well as the east coast of Australia, as well as Norfolk Island, Hawaii, and the French Polynesia.

== Description ==
A. connexus has a length of between 4.4 and 4.8 mm, and a metallic green appearance. The wings have two broad, brown bands, which are fused anteriorly.
