= Sciapus tener =

Scientific classification
- Domain: Eukaryota
- Kingdom: Animalia
- Phylum: Arthropoda
- Class: Insecta
- Order: Diptera
- Family: Dolichopodidae
- Subfamily: Sciapodinae
- Tribe: Sciapodini
- Genus: Sciapus
- Species: S. tener

Binomial name
- Sciapus tener (Loew, 1862)

Synonyms
- Psilopus tener Loew, 1862

Species of fly

Sciapus tener is a species of long-legged fly in the family Dolichopodidae.
