= Sciapus pallens =

Scientific classification
- Domain: Eukaryota
- Kingdom: Animalia
- Phylum: Arthropoda
- Class: Insecta
- Order: Diptera
- Family: Dolichopodidae
- Subfamily: Sciapodinae
- Tribe: Sciapodini
- Genus: Sciapus
- Species: S. pallens

Binomial name
- Sciapus pallens (Wiedemann, 1830)

Synonyms
- Psilopus albonotatus Loew, 1857; Psilopus pallens Wiedemann, 1830

Species of fly

Sciapus pallens is a species of long-legged fly in the family Dolichopodidae. It is found in Europe.
