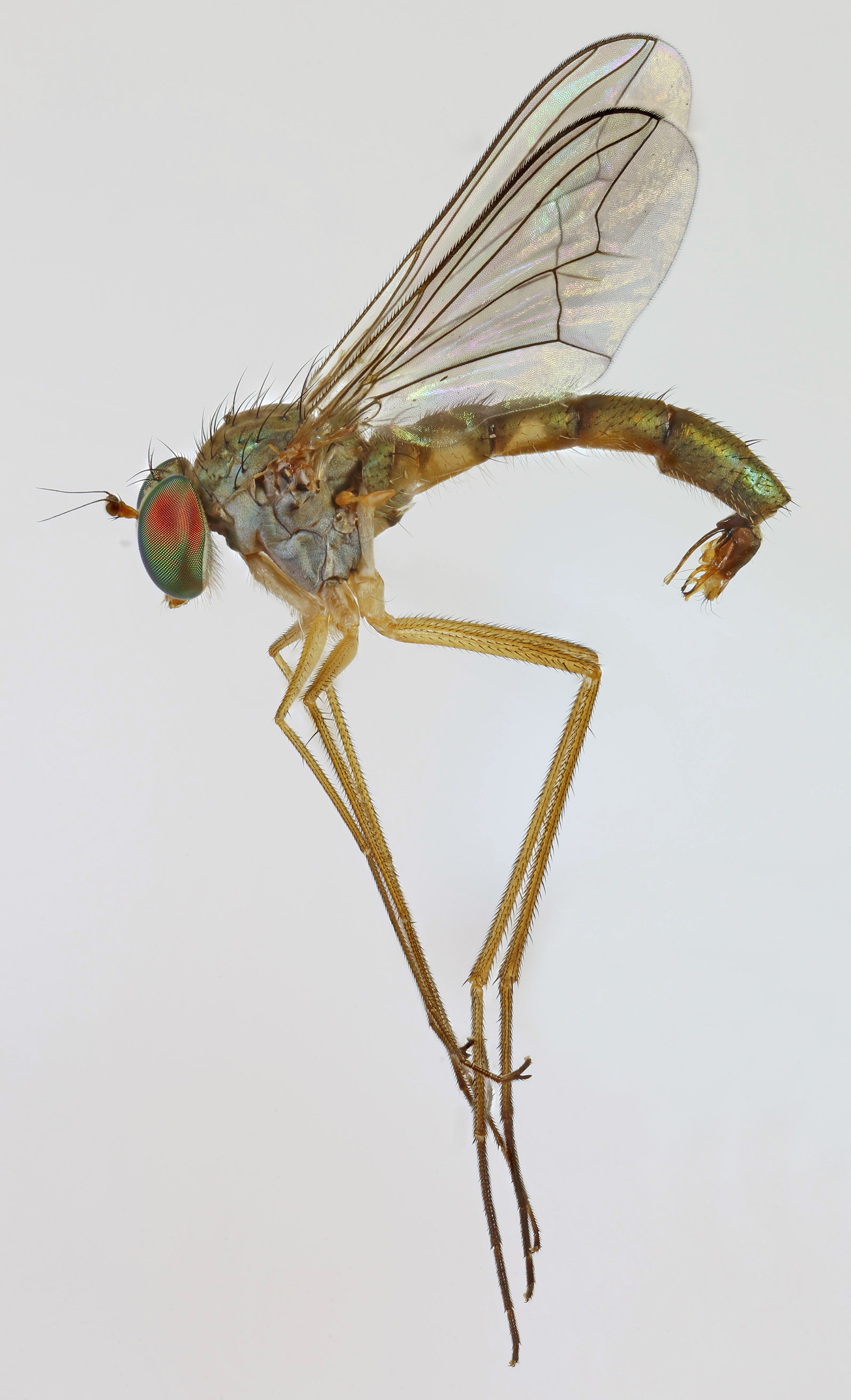
- Sciapus wiedemanni North Wales

Scientific classification
- Kingdom: Animalia
- Phylum: Arthropoda
- Class: Insecta
- Order: Diptera
- Family: Dolichopodidae
- Subfamily: Sciapodinae
- Tribe: Sciapodini
- Genus: Sciapus
- Species: S. wiedemanni

Binomial name
- Sciapus wiedemanni (Fallén, 1823)

Synonyms
- Leptopus wiedemanni Fallén, 1823; Psilopus contristans Meigen, 1824 (nec Wiedemann, 1817); Sciapus divergens Van Duzee, 1933; Sciapus nervosus British auctt., nec Lehmann, 1822

= Sciapus wiedemanni =

Species of fly

Sciapus wiedemanni is a species of fly in the family Dolichopodidae. It is widely distributed across Europe. It has also been introduced to Washington, United States and Ontario, Canada.
