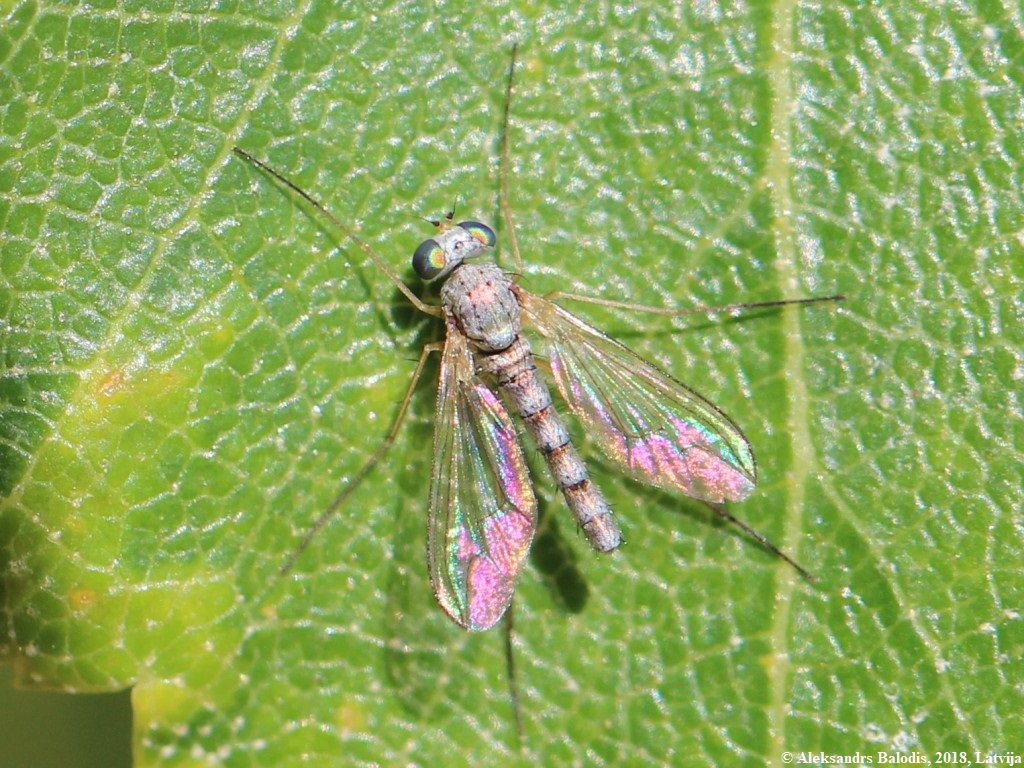

Scientific classification
- Domain: Eukaryota
- Kingdom: Animalia
- Phylum: Arthropoda
- Class: Insecta
- Order: Diptera
- Family: Dolichopodidae
- Subfamily: Sciapodinae
- Tribe: Sciapodini
- Genus: Sciapus
- Species: S. maritimus

Binomial name
- Sciapus maritimus Becker, 1918

= Sciapus maritimus =

Species of fly

Sciapus maritimus is a species of long-legged fly in the family Dolichopodidae.
