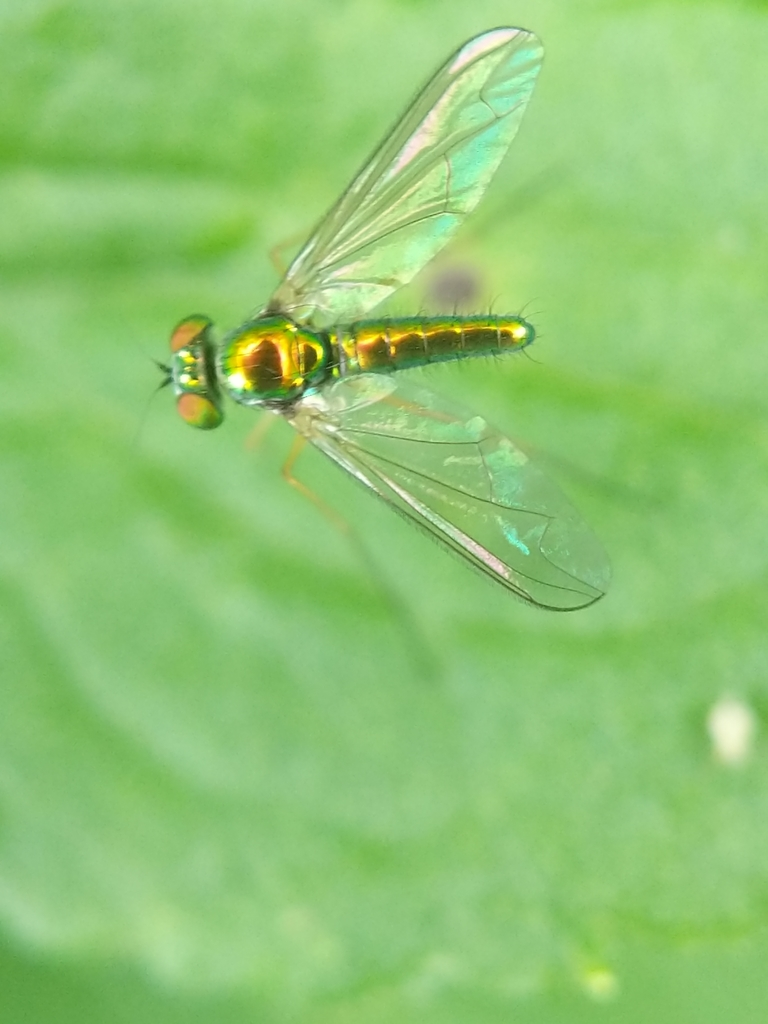
- Male specimen (Monroe County, PA, USA)
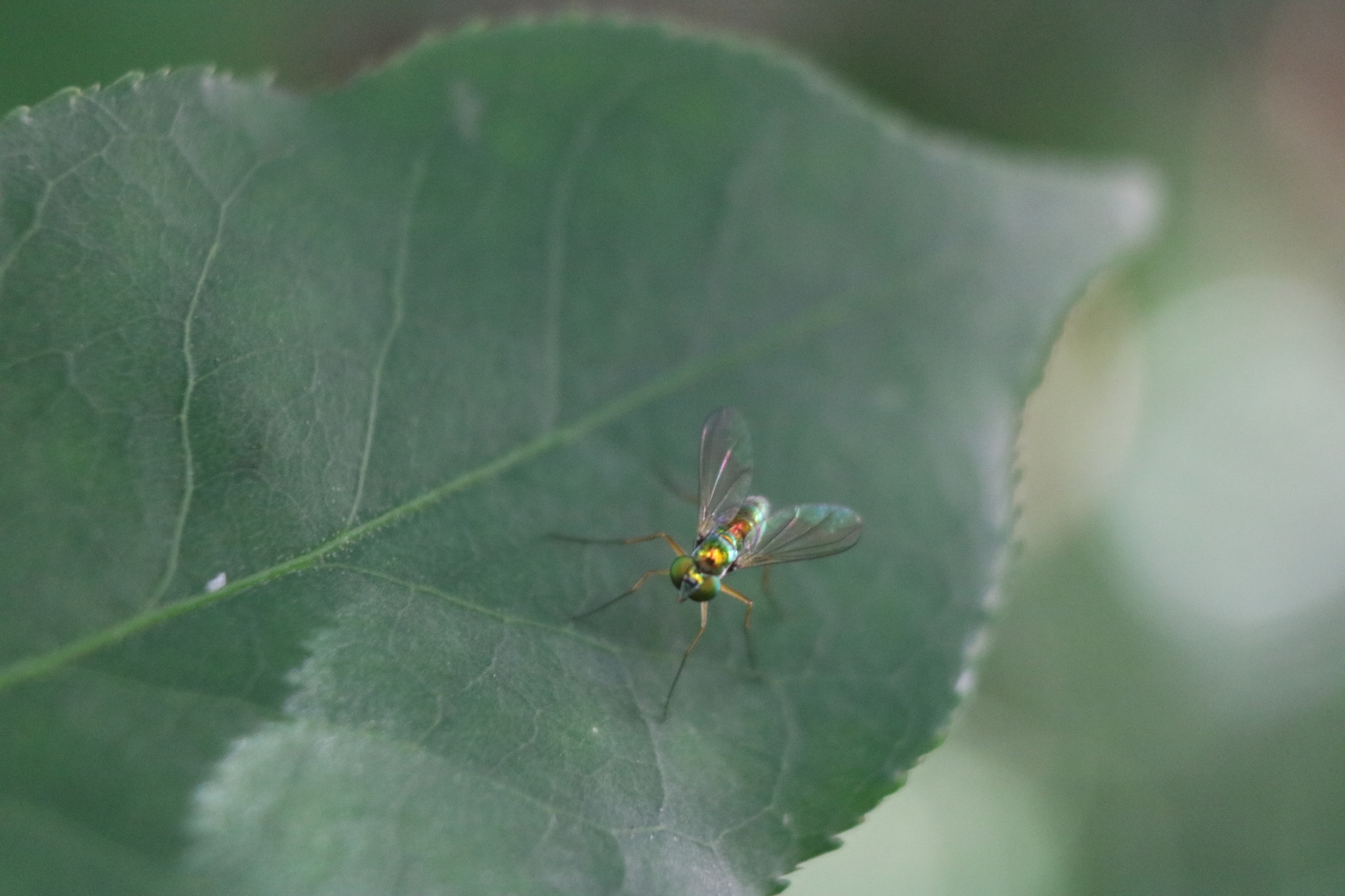
- Female specimen (Ontario, Canada)

Scientific classification
- Kingdom: Animalia
- Phylum: Arthropoda
- Clade: Pancrustacea
- Class: Insecta
- Order: Diptera
- Family: Dolichopodidae
- Genus: Amblypsilopus
- Species: A. scintillans

Binomial name
- Amblypsilopus scintillans (Loew, 1861)

Synonyms
- Psilopus scintillans Loew, 1861; Psilopus angustatus Enderlein, 1912; Sciapus fulgidus Parent, 1929; Sciapus dubiosus Van Duzee, 1932

= Amblypsilopus scintillans =

Species of long-legged fly

Amblypsilopus scintillans is a species of long-legged fly in the Amblypsilopus genus.

== Description ==
The second and third coxae are black in males, while in females they can be dark yellow to brown. The legs are otherwise yellow in both genders. In males, the second tibia is without bristles. The wing costa is normal, and the body shines, distinguishing it from both A. costalis and A. pollinosus.

== Range ==
It resides in eastern North America.
