= Abbemyia nigrofasciata =

Scientific classification
- Kingdom: Animalia
- Phylum: Arthropoda
- Clade: Pancrustacea
- Class: Insecta
- Order: Diptera
- Family: Dolichopodidae
- Genus: Abbemyia
- Species: A. nigrofasciata

Binomial name
- Abbemyia nigrofasciata (Macquart, 1850)

Synonyms
- Psilopus nigrofasciatus Macquart, 1850; Chrysosoma chetiscutatum Parent, 1932; Chrysosoma regale Parent, 1932

Species of fly

Abbemyia nigrofasciata is a species of fly in the family Dolichopodidae. It was first described by Pierre-Justin-Marie Macquart in 1850 as Psilopus nigrofasciatus.

== Distribution ==
Abbemyia nigrofasciata is known from Australia, including New South Wales and Queensland.
