= Abbemyia =

Scientific classification
- Kingdom: Animalia
- Phylum: Arthropoda
- Class: Insecta
- Order: Diptera
- Family: Dolichopodidae
- Subfamily: Sciapodinae
- Tribe: Chrysosomatini
- Genus: Abbemyia; Bickel, 1994

Type species
- Psilopus nigrofasciatus Macquart, 1850

Genus of flies

Abbemyia is a genus of flies in the family Dolichopodidae, known from Australia and New Caledonia. It was first described in 1994 by Australian entomologist Daniel John Bickel who named the genus to honour the French entomologist Abbé Octave Parent, who studied the family Dolichopodidae.

== Species ==
- Abbemyia baylaci Bickel, 2002
- Abbemyia nigrofasciata (Macquart, 1850) (Synonyms: Chrysosoma chetiscutatum Parent, 1932, Chrysosoma regale Parent, 1932)
- Abbemyia taree Bickel, 1994
