= Pseudoparentia =

Scientific classification
- Kingdom: Animalia
- Phylum: Arthropoda
- Clade: Pancrustacea
- Class: Insecta
- Order: Diptera
- Family: Dolichopodidae
- Subfamily: Sciapodinae
- Tribe: Chrysosomatini
- Genus: Pseudoparentia; Bickel, 1994

Type species
- Pseudoparentia centralis Bickel, 1994

Genus of flies

Pseudoparentia is a genus of flies in the family Dolichopodidae. It is known from Australia.

== Species ==
- Pseudoparentia advena Bickel, 1994
- Pseudoparentia canalicula Bickel, 2013
- Pseudoparentia centralis Bickel, 1994
- Pseudoparentia hangayi Bickel, 1994
- Pseudoparentia niharae Bickel, 2013
- Pseudoparentia nullaborensis Bickel, 1994
- Pseudoparentia tricosa Bickel, 1994
