= Bickeliolus =

Scientific classification
- Kingdom: Animalia
- Phylum: Arthropoda
- Class: Insecta
- Order: Diptera
- Family: Dolichopodidae
- Subfamily: Sciapodinae
- Tribe: Chrysosomatini
- Genus: Bickeliolus; Grichanov, 1996

Type species
- Ethiosciapus (Bickeliolus) maslovae Grichanov, 1996

Genus of flies

Bickeliolus is a genus of flies in the family Dolichopodidae. It was originally a subgenus of Ethiosciapus, but was later raised to genus rank in 1998.

== Species ==
- Bickeliolus alluaudi (Parent, 1935)
- Bickeliolus bogoria Grichanov, 2021
- Bickeliolus haemorhoidalis (Becker, 1923)
- Bickeliolus lamellatus (Parent, 1935)
- Bickeliolus lasiophthalmus (Lamb, 1922)
- Bickeliolus maslovae (Grichanov, 1996)
- Bickeliolus trochanteralis (Curran, 1924)

Species that are now synonyms:

- Bickeliolus gerlachi (Meuffels & Grootaert, 2007): synonym of Bickeliolus alluaudi (Parent, 1935)
