= Gigantosciapus =

Scientific classification
- Kingdom: Animalia
- Phylum: Arthropoda
- Class: Insecta
- Order: Diptera
- Family: Dolichopodidae
- Subfamily: Sciapodinae
- Tribe: Chrysosomatini
- Genus: Gigantosciapus; Grichanov, 1997

Type species
- Gigantosciapus oldroydi Grichanov, 1997

Genus of flies

Gigantosciapus is a genus of flies in the family Dolichopodidae.

== Species ==
- Gigantosciapus africanus (Parent, 1933)
- Gigantosciapus anomalipes (Parent, 1935)
- Gigantosciapus decellei (Vanschuytbroeck, 1966)
- Gigantosciapus francoisi Grichanov, 1998
- Gigantosciapus gemmarius (Walker, 1849)
- Gigantosciapus inversus (Curran, 1927)
- Gigantosciapus kamerunensis (Becker, 1923)
- Gigantosciapus meyeri (Vanschuytbroeck, 1962)
- Gigantosciapus nataliae Grichanov, 1998
- Gigantosciapus oldroydi Grichanov, 1997
- Gigantosciapus pseudogemmarius (Parent, 1933)
- Gigantosciapus saegeri (Vanschuytbroeck, 1959)
- Gigantosciapus tuberculatus (Curran, 1927)
