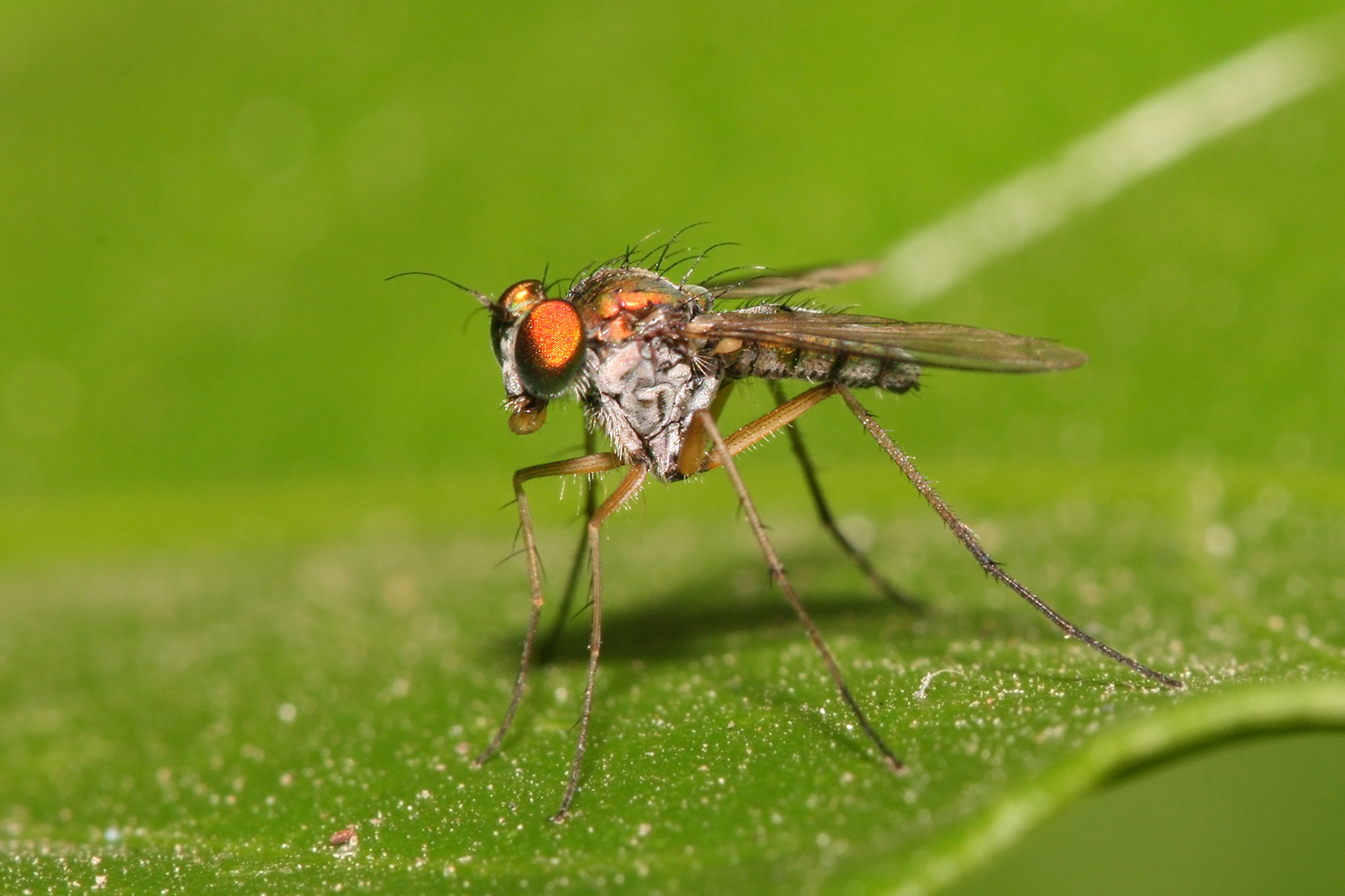
- Chrysosoma sp.

Scientific classification
- Kingdom: Animalia
- Phylum: Arthropoda
- Clade: Pancrustacea
- Class: Insecta
- Order: Diptera
- Family: Dolichopodidae
- Subfamily: Sciapodinae
- Tribe: Chrysosomatini
- Genus: Chrysosoma; Guérin-Méneville, 1831

Type species
- Psilopus fasciatus (= Dolichopus aeneus Fabricius, 1805) Guérin-Méneville, 1831

Subgenera
- Chrysosoma Guérin-Méneville, 1831; Kalocheta Becker, 1923; Mesoblepharius Bigot, 1859

Synonyms
- Agonosoma Guérin-Méneville, 1838; Eudasypus Bigot, 1888; Eudasypus Bigot, 1890; Margaritostylus Bigot, 1859; Megistostylus Bigot, 1859; Oariopherus Bigot, 1888; Oariopherus Bigot, 1890; Oariostylus Bigot, 1859; Spathiopsilopus Bigot, 1888; Spathipsilopus Bigot, 1890

= Chrysosoma =

Genus of flies

Chrysosoma is a genus of flies in the family Dolichopodidae. It is a large genus, with more than 200 species distributed in the Old World and Oceania.

== Species ==
Subgenus Chrysosoma Guérin-Méneville, 1831:

- Chrysosoma aeneum (Fabricius, 1805)
- Chrysosoma aequatoriale Parent, 1933
- Chrysosoma aestimabile Parent, 1933
- Chrysosoma aestimatum (Walker, 1859)
- Chrysosoma agrihan Bickel, 1994
- Chrysosoma akrikense Bickel in Bickel & Martin, 2022
- Chrysosoma alboguttatum Parent, 1930
- Chrysosoma aldrichi (De Meijere, 1913)
- Chrysosoma annuliferum Frey, 1924
- Chrysosoma annulitarse Parent, 1935
- Chrysosoma anoplum Meuffels & Grootaert, 1999
- Chrysosoma antennatum Becker, 1922
- Chrysosoma argenteomicans Parent, 1935
- Chrysosoma argentinoides Hollis, 1964
- Chrysosoma armillatum (Bigot, 1890)
- Chrysosoma arrogans Parent, 1934
- Chrysosoma austeni Parent, 1934
- Chrysosoma baiyerense Bickel in Bickel & Martin, 2022
- Chrysosoma bearni Parent, 1935
- Chrysosoma betege Bickel in Bickel & Martin, 2022
- Chrysosoma bicolor Parent, 1937
- Chrysosoma bicoloratum Grichanov, 1999
- Chrysosoma bifiguratum Becker, 1922
- Chrysosoma biseriatum Parent, 1932
- Chrysosoma bitcoin Bickel in Bickel & Martin, 2022
- Chrysosoma callosum Parent, 1929
- Chrysosoma cautum Parent, 1935
- Chrysosoma ceramense (De Meijere, 1913)
- Chrysosoma chinense Becker, 1922
- Chrysosoma chrysoleucum Frey, 1924
- Chrysosoma cilifemoratum Parent, 1933
- Chrysosoma cinctitarse (De Meijere, 1914)
- Chrysosoma clarkei Bickel, 1994
- Chrysosoma complicatum Becker, 1922
- Chrysosoma compressum Becker, 1922
- Chrysosoma confusum Parent, 1932
- Chrysosoma consimile Lamb, 1929
- Chrysosoma cooksoni Grichanov, 2021
- Chrysosoma cordieri Parent, 1934
- Chrysosoma corruptor Parent, 1933
- Chrysosoma crassum Yang & Saigusa, 2001
- Chrysosoma crinicorne (Wiedemann, 1824)
- Chrysosoma crypticum Becker, 1922
- Chrysosoma cupido (Walker, 1849)
- Chrysosoma cuprevittatum Bickel in Bickel & Martin, 2022
- Chrysosoma cyaneculiscutum Bickel & Wei, 1996
- Chrysosoma dalianum Yang & Saigusa, 2001
- Chrysosoma damingshanum Yang & Zhu, 2012
- Chrysosoma derisor Parent, 1934
- Chrysosoma digitatum Yang & Zhu, 2012
- Chrysosoma disparitarse Parent, 1935
- Chrysosoma diversicolor Parent, 1928
- Chrysosoma duplociliatum Parent, 1933
- Chrysosoma egens (Walker, 1859)
- Chrysosoma eminens Parent, 1935
- Chrysosoma excellens Parent, 1934
- Chrysosoma excitatum Frey, 1924
- Chrysosoma exilipes Parent, 1935
- Chrysosoma ferriferum Lamb, 1929
- Chrysosoma fissilamellatum Parent, 1939
- Chrysosoma fissum Becker, 1922
- Chrysosoma fistulatum Frey, 1924
- Chrysosoma flavipes (De Meijere, 1914)
- Chrysosoma flavitibiale (De Meijere, 1915)
- Chrysosoma floccosum Becker, 1922
- Chrysosoma fumifemoratum Bickel in Bickel & Martin, 2022
- Chrysosoma furcatum Wang, Zhu & Yang, 2014
- Chrysosoma fusiforme Frey, 1924
- Chrysosoma globiferum (Wiedemann, 1830)
- Chrysosoma graphicum Parent, 1935
- Chrysosoma gromieri Parent, 1929
- Chrysosoma guamense Bickel, 1994
- Chrysosoma guangdongense Zhang, Yang & Grootaert, 2003
- Chrysosoma guizhouense Yang, 1995
- Chrysosoma hainanum Yang, 1998
- Chrysosoma hangzhouense Yang, 1995
- Chrysosoma hebereri Parent, 1932
- Chrysosoma ignavum Becker, 1922
- Chrysosoma impressum Becker, 1922
- Chrysosoma impudens Parent, 1941
- Chrysosoma innatum Lamb, 1929
- Chrysosoma interruptum Becker, 1922
- Chrysosoma ituriense Parent, 1933
- Chrysosoma jingpinganum Yang & Saigusa, 2001
- Chrysosoma kusaiense Bickel, 1994
- Chrysosoma kuznetzovi Grichanov, 1997
- Chrysosoma kwangense Grichanov, 1999
- Chrysosoma lacteimicans Becker, 1923
- Chrysosoma leopoldi Parent, 1932
- Chrysosoma leucopogon (Wiedemann, 1824)
- Chrysosoma leucopygum (De Meijere, 1906)
- Chrysosoma leveri Parent, 1934
- Chrysosoma lilacinum (De Meijere, 1913)
- Chrysosoma liui Zhu & Yang, 2011
- Chrysosoma lofokiana Hollis, 1964
- Chrysosoma longum Yang & Zhu, 2012
- Chrysosoma loriseta Parent, 1934
- Chrysosoma lucare Bickel, 1994
- Chrysosoma luchunanum Yang & Saigusa, 2001
- Chrysosoma lucigena (Walker, 1859)
- Chrysosoma ludens Parent, 1935
- Chrysosoma lugubre Parent, 1935
- Chrysosoma macalpinei Bickel in Bickel & Martin, 2022
- Chrysosoma maculipenne Guérin-Méneville, 1831
- Chrysosoma maculiventre Parent, 1935
- Chrysosoma marginatum Becker, 1923
- Chrysosoma marianum Bickel, 1994
- Chrysosoma marki Hollis, 1964
- Chrysosoma medium Becker, 1922
- Chrysosoma meijeri Parent, 1932
- Chrysosoma melanochirum Bezzi, 1928
- Chrysosoma minusculum Becker, 1923
- Chrysosoma molestum Parent, 1934
- Chrysosoma mutilatum Parent, 1935
- Chrysosoma nanlingense Zhu & Yang, 2005
- Chrysosoma negrobovi Grichanov, 2021
- Chrysosoma nguemba Grichanov, 2004
- Chrysosoma nigrohalteratum Parent, 1939
- Chrysosoma nobile Parent, 1933
- Chrysosoma norma Curran, 1927
- Chrysosoma nudifrons (De Meijere, 1910)
- Chrysosoma nyingchiense Wang, Zhu & Yang, 2014
- Chrysosoma obscuratum (Van der Wulp, 1884)
- Chrysosoma obscuripes Parent, 1934
- Chrysosoma olegi Bickel in Bickel & Martin, 2021
- Chrysosoma orokaindi Bickel in Bickel & Martin, 2022
- Chrysosoma oromissim Bickel in Bickel & Martin, 2022
- Chrysosoma pacificum Parent, 1930
- Chrysosoma pagdeni Parent, 1937
- Chrysosoma palapes Hardy & Kohn, 1964
- Chrysosoma pallipilosum Yang & Saigusa, 2001
- Chrysosoma papuasinum (Bigot, 1890)
- Chrysosoma parvicucullatum Lamb, 1929
- Chrysosoma patellatum (Van der Wulp, 1881)
- Chrysosoma patelliferum (Thomson, 1869)
- Chrysosoma pauperculum Parent, 1933
- Chrysosoma pelagicum Bickel, 1994
- Chrysosoma petersi Dyte, 1957
- Chrysosoma pexum Becker, 1922
- Chrysosoma philippinense Frey, 1924
- Chrysosoma piriforme Becker, 1922
- Chrysosoma placens Parent, 1935
- Chrysosoma planitarse Becker, 1922
- Chrysosoma pomeroyi Curran, 1927
- Chrysosoma praelatum Becker, 1923
- Chrysosoma proliciens (Walker, 1857)
- Chrysosoma provocans Parent, 1934
- Chrysosoma pseudocallosum Bickel, 1994
- Chrysosoma quadratum (Van der Wulp, 1884)
- Chrysosoma ruyuanense Zhu & Yang, 2005
- Chrysosoma sagax Becker, 1922
- Chrysosoma salomonis Parent, 1929
- Chrysosoma saonekense (De Meijere, 1913)
- Chrysosoma schistellum Frey, 1924
- Chrysosoma serratum Yang & Saigusa, 2001
- Chrysosoma seticorne (Walker, 1864)
- Chrysosoma setosum (Van der Wulp, 1891)
- Chrysosoma shixingense Zhu & Yang, 2005
- Chrysosoma sigma Parent, 1935
- Chrysosoma simalurense (De Meijere, 1916)
- Chrysosoma singulare Parent, 1933
- Chrysosoma snelli Curran, 1927
- Chrysosoma solitarium Parent, 1935
- Chrysosoma spiniferum (Van der Wulp, 1896)
- Chrysosoma spinosum Wang, Zhu & Yang, 2014
- Chrysosoma splendidum (Van der Wulp, 1868)
- Chrysosoma stolyarovi Grichanov, 1998
- Chrysosoma stubbsi Grichanov, 1997
- Chrysosoma sumatranum Enderlein, 1912
- Chrysosoma tabubil Bickel in Bickel & Martin, 2022
- Chrysosoma tenuipenne Curran, 1927
- Chrysosoma terminatum Becker, 1922
- Chrysosoma tongbiguanum Yang & Zhu, 2012
- Chrysosoma townesi Bickel, 1994
- Chrysosoma trigonocercus Wei & Song, 2005
- Chrysosoma tuberculicorne (Macquart, 1855)
- Chrysosoma undulatum Becker, 1922
- Chrysosoma usherae Grichanov, 2021
- Chrysosoma vanbruggeni Grichanov, 2021
- Chrysosoma varitum Wei, 2006
- Chrysosoma viduum Lamb, 1929
- Chrysosoma vietnamense Wang, Zhang & Yang, 2012
- Chrysosoma vittatum (Wiedemann, 1819)
- Chrysosoma waigeense (De Meijere, 1913)
- Chrysosoma watutense Bickel in Bickel & Martin, 2022
- Chrysosoma woodi Parent, 1935
- Chrysosoma xanthodes Yang & Li, 1998
- Chrysosoma yapense Bickel, 1994
- Chrysosoma yunnanense Yang & Saigusa, 2001
- Chrysosoma zaitzevi Grichanov, 1997
- Chrysosoma zengchengense Zhu & Yang, 2005
- Chrysosoma zephyrus (Bigot, 1858)
- Chrysosoma zhoui Yang & Zhu, 2012

Subgenus Kalocheta Becker, 1923:

- Chrysosoma cucanum (Negrobov & Kulibali, 1983)
- Chrysosoma neoliberia Bickel, 1994
- Chrysosoma passivum (Becker, 1923)
- Chrysosoma villiersi (Vanschuytbroeck, 1970)

Subgenus Mesoblepharius Bigot, 1859:

- Chrysosoma aequilobatum Parent, 1933
- Chrysosoma albilimbatum (Bigot, 1890)
- Chrysosoma albocrinitatum Curran, 1925
- Chrysosoma angolense Parent, 1933
- Chrysosoma bacchi Dyte, 1957
- Chrysosoma bredoi Parent, 1933
- Chrysosoma consentium Curran, 1925
- Chrysosoma continuum Curran, 1927
- Chrysosoma gemmeum (Walker, 1849)
- Chrysosoma hargreavesi Curran, 1927
- Chrysosoma hirsutulum Parent, 1933
- Chrysosoma katangense Curran, 1925
- Chrysosoma lavinia Curran, 1927
- Chrysosoma liberia Curran, 1929
- Chrysosoma mesotrichum (Bezzi, 1908)
- Chrysosoma pseudorepertum Grichanov, 1998
- Chrysosoma repertum Becker, 1923
- Chrysosoma schoutedeni Curran, 1927
- Chrysosoma senegalense (Macquart, 1834)
- Chrysosoma tanasijtshuki Grichanov, 1997
- Chrysosoma tractatum Becker, 1923
- Chrysosoma tricrinitum Parent, 1933
- Chrysosoma triumphator Parent, 1933
- Chrysosoma varivittatum Curran, 1925
- Chrysosoma vividum Becker, 1923
- Chrysosoma zinovjevi Grichanov, 1997

Unrecognised species:

- Chrysosoma adoptatum Parent, 1935
- Chrysosoma chromatipes (Bigot, 1890)
- Chrysosoma clarum (Walker, 1857)
- Chrysosoma clypeatum Parent, 1937
- Chrysosoma collucens (Walker, 1857)
- Chrysosoma derelictum (Walker, 1857)
- Chrysosoma doleschalli Enderlein, 1912
- Chrysosoma fuscopennatum (Bigot, 1890)
- Chrysosoma gilvipes Enderlein, 1912
- Chrysosoma illiciens (Walker, 1857)
- Chrysosoma insulanum Parent, 1939
- Chrysosoma leiopum (Doleschall, 1856)
- Chrysosoma moderatum (Walker, 1864)
- Chrysosoma nitens (Fabricius, 1805)
- Chrysosoma nubeculosum Becker, 1922
- Chrysosoma orciferum (Walker, 1859)
- Chrysosoma pauper Becker, 1922
- Chrysosoma posterum Becker, 1922
- Chrysosoma posticum (Walker, 1857)
- Chrysosoma prolectans (Walker, 1857)
- Chrysosoma robustum (Walker, 1857)
- Chrysosoma rubicundum Becker, 1922
- Chrysosoma setipes (Bigot, 1890)
- Chrysosoma subfascipennis (Curran, 1926)
- Chrysosoma subnotatum (Walker, 1857)
- Chrysosoma villipes (Rondani, 1875)

Species considered nomina nuda:

- Chrysosoma reficitum (Parent, 1934)

Species considered nomina dubia:

- Chrysosoma arduum (Parent, 1936)
- Chrysosoma benignum Parent, 1934
- Chrysosoma carum (Walker, 1849)
- Chrysosoma flexum (Loew, 1858)
- Chrysosoma laeve (Bigot, 1891)
- Chrysosoma praecipuum Parent, 1936
- Chrysosoma trigemmans (Walker, 1849)

Species that are now synonyms:

- Chrysosoma fasciatum (Guérin-Méneville, 1831): synonym of Chrysosoma aeneum (Fabricius, 1805)

Renamed species:

- Chrysosoma inerme (De Meijere, 1913) (originally Psilopus albopilosus inermis De Meijere, 1913, nec Psilopus inermis Loew, 1861): renamed to Chrysosoma anoplum Meuffels & Grootaert, 1999

Species moved to other genera:

- Chrysosoma asperum Parent, 1933: moved to Amblypsilopus, synonym of Amblypsilopus bevisi (Curran, 1927)
- Chrysosoma centrale Becker, 1923: moved to Amblypsilopus
- Chrysosoma insensibile Yang, 1995 moved to Amblypsilopus
- Chrysosoma ungulatum Parent, 1941: moved to Amblypsilopus
