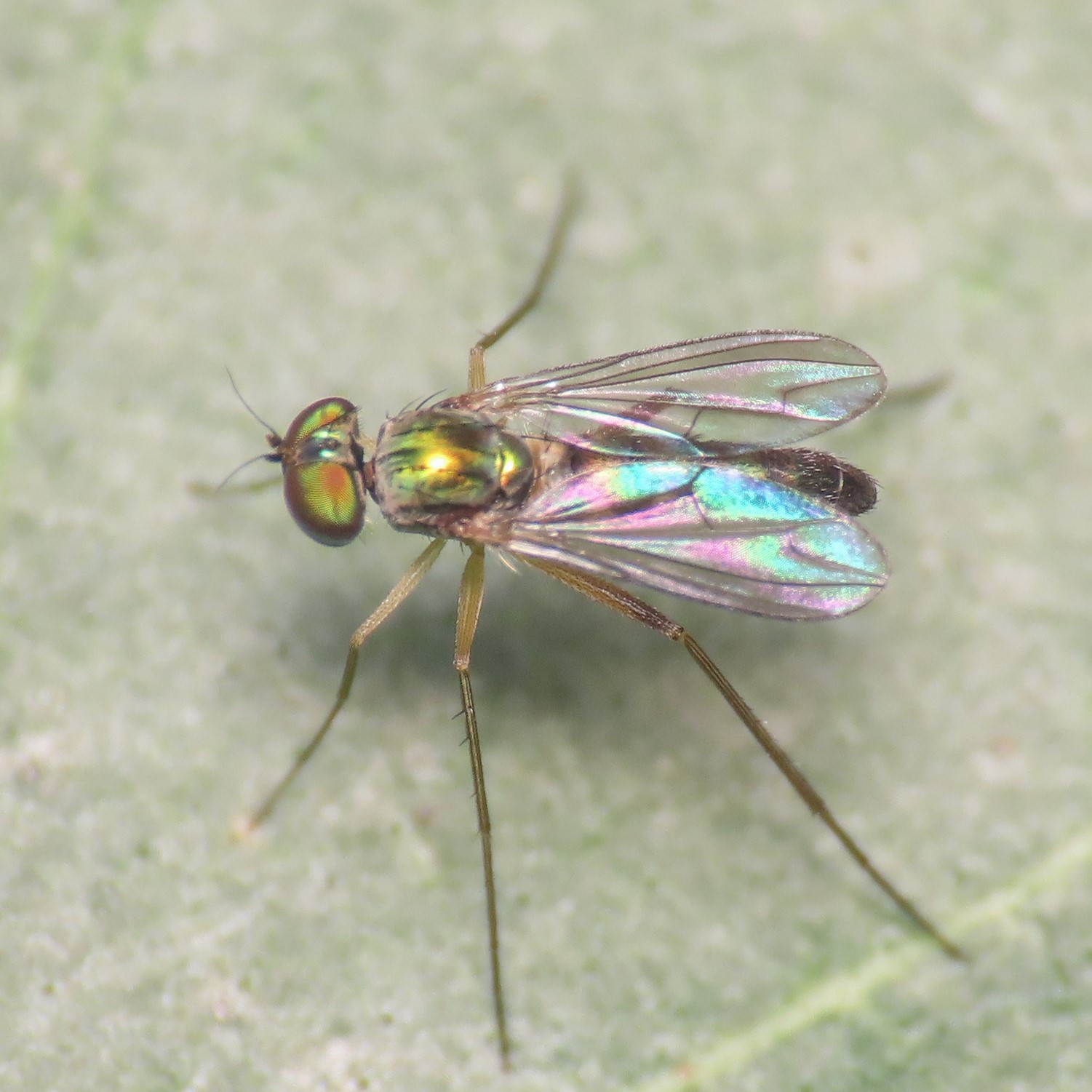
- Mascaromyia leptogaster

Scientific classification
- Kingdom: Animalia
- Phylum: Arthropoda
- Class: Insecta
- Order: Diptera
- Family: Dolichopodidae
- Subfamily: Sciapodinae
- Tribe: Sciapodini
- Genus: Mascaromyia; Bickel, 1994

Type species
- Psilopus pollicifer Lamb, 1922

= Mascaromyia =

Genus of flies

Mascaromyia is a genus of flies in the family Dolichopodidae, endemic to the western Indian Ocean islands. It is named after the main distribution of the genus, the islands of the submarine Mascarene Plateau, combining it with "myia" (the Greek word for fly).

== Species ==
- Mascaromyia albitarsis (Parent)
- Mascaromyia alexisi Grichanov
- Mascaromyia amplicaudata (Lamb, 1922)
- Mascaromyia babichae Grichanov, 1996
- Mascaromyia bebourensis Grichanov, 2004
- Mascaromyia bickeli Grichanov, 1996
- Mascaromyia brooksi Grichanov, 2004
- Mascaromyia courtoisi Grichanov, 2020
- Mascaromyia cummingi Grichanov, 2004
- Mascaromyia desjardinsi (Macquart, 1842)
- Mascaromyia duplicata (Parent, 1932)
- Mascaromyia dytei Grichanov, 1996
- Mascaromyia frolovi Grichanov, 1996
- Mascaromyia grandicaudata (Lamb, 1922)
- Mascaromyia grimaldii Grichanov, 2004
- Mascaromyia hutsoni Grichanov, 1996
- Mascaromyia indistincta (Lamb, 1922)
- Mascaromyia leptogaster (Thomson, 1869)
- Mascaromyia loici Grichanov, 2004
- Mascaromyia magnicaudata (Lamb, 1922)
- Mascaromyia makhotkini Grichanov, 1996
- Mascaromyia martirei Grichanov, 2017
- Mascaromyia mauritiensis (Parent, 1939)
- Mascaromyia michaeli Grichanov, 2004
- Mascaromyia parallela (Macquart, 1842)
- Mascaromyia pollicifera (Lamb, 1922)
- Mascaromyia rochati Grichanov, 2020
- Mascaromyia rufiventris (Macquart, 1842)
- Mascaromyia shabuninae Grichanov, 1996
- Mascaromyia tatyanae Grichanov, 2004
- Mascaromyia vagabunda (Lamb, 1926)
