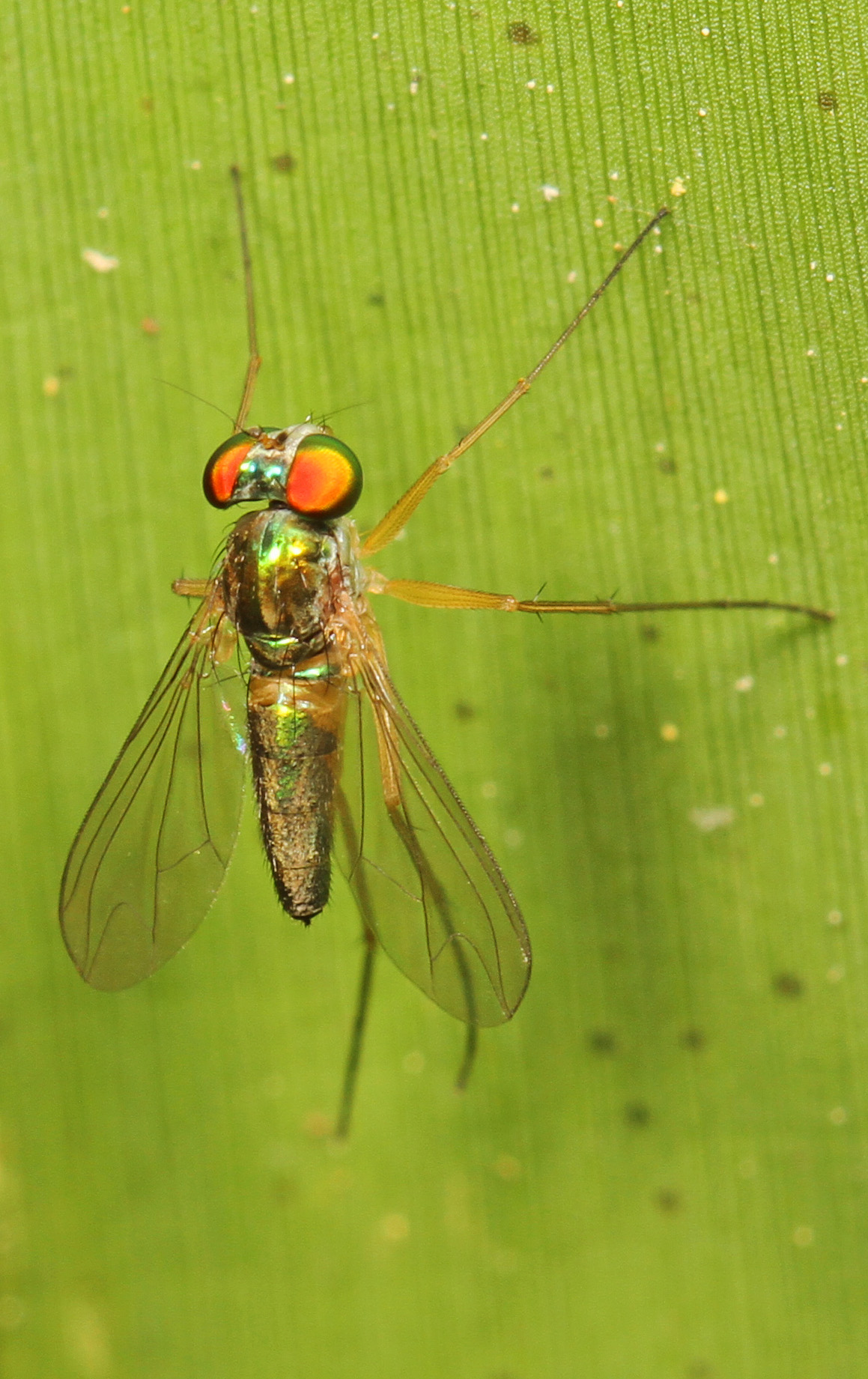
- Amblypsilopus sp.

Scientific classification
- Kingdom: Animalia
- Phylum: Arthropoda
- Clade: Pancrustacea
- Class: Insecta
- Order: Diptera
- Family: Dolichopodidae
- Subfamily: Sciapodinae
- Tribe: Chrysosomatini
- Genus: Amblypsilopus; Bigot, 1888

Type species
- Psilopus psittacinus Loew, 1861

Synonyms
- Australiola Parent, 1932; Gnamptopsilopus Aldrich, 1893; Labeneura Parent, 1937; Leptorhethum Aldrich, 1893; Sciopolina Curran, 1924

= Amblypsilopus =

Genus of flies

Amblypsilopus is a genus of flies in the family Dolichopodidae. It is a large genus, with about 350 species recorded. However, it is possibly polyphyletic.

== Species ==
- Amblypsilopus abruptus (Walker, 1859)
- Amblypsilopus acuminatus Tang, Zhu & Yang, 2019
- Amblypsilopus albicinctus (De Meijere, 1913)
- Amblypsilopus albifacies (Parent, 1931)
- Amblypsilopus albipes (Becker, 1922)
- Amblypsilopus albisignatus Bickel, 1994
- Amblypsilopus aliciensis Bickel, 1994
- Amblypsilopus alipatei Bickel, 2009
- Amblypsilopus alter (Becker, 1922)
- Amblypsilopus ambila Grichanov, 2004
- Amblypsilopus ambrym Bickel, 2006
- Amblypsilopus amnoni Bickel, 2019
- Amblypsilopus ampliatus Yang, 1995
- Amblypsilopus analamazaotra Grichanov, 2021
- Amblypsilopus ancistroides Yang, 1995
- Amblypsilopus andasibensis Grichanov, 2021
- Amblypsilopus angustatus (Aldrich, 1893)
- Amblypsilopus angustifrons (Parent, 1929)
- Amblypsilopus ankarana Grichanov, 2021
- Amblypsilopus ankaratrensis Grichanov, 1999
- Amblypsilopus annanensis Bickel, 1994
- Amblypsilopus anomalicornis (Becker, 1922)
- Amblypsilopus antennatus (Becker, 1922)
- Amblypsilopus apicalis Wang, Zhu & Yang, 2012
- Amblypsilopus arboreus Bickel, 1994
- Amblypsilopus arenarius Bickel, 2009
- Amblypsilopus argyrodendron Bickel, 1994
- Amblypsilopus armiger (Van Duzee, 1931)
- Amblypsilopus asau Bickel, 2009
- Amblypsilopus augustus Bickel, 1994
- Amblypsilopus auratus (Curran, 1924)
- Amblypsilopus aurichalceus (Becker, 1922)
- Amblypsilopus austerus (Parent, 1935)
- Amblypsilopus babindensis Bickel, 1994
- Amblypsilopus bairae Grichanov, 2021
- Amblypsilopus baoshanus Yang, 1998
- Amblypsilopus barkalovi Grichanov, 1998
- Amblypsilopus baroalba Bickel, 1994
- Amblypsilopus basalis Yang, 1997
- Amblypsilopus basilewskyi (Vanschuytbroeck, 1960)
- Amblypsilopus basistylatus (Parent, 1939)
- Amblypsilopus basseti Bickel, 1994
- Amblypsilopus bataviensis Bickel, 1994
- Amblypsilopus batilamu Bickel, 2009
- Amblypsilopus belauensis Bickel, 1994
- Amblypsilopus bellimanus (Van Duzee, 1927)
- Amblypsilopus bereni Bickel, 1994
- Amblypsilopus bertiensis Bickel, 1994
- Amblypsilopus bevisi (Curran, 1927)
- Amblypsilopus bezzii Bickel, 2006
- Amblypsilopus bicolor (Loew, 1861)
- Amblypsilopus bilobus (Van Duzee, 1929)
- Amblypsilopus bimestris Bickel, 1994
- Amblypsilopus bimus Bickel, 1994
- Amblypsilopus bipectinatus (Parent, 1934)
- Amblypsilopus biprovincialis Bickel, 1994
- Amblypsilopus birraduk Bickel, 1994
- Amblypsilopus bonniae (Irwin, 1974)
- Amblypsilopus borroloola Bickel, 1994
- Amblypsilopus bouvieri (Parent, 1927)
- Amblypsilopus bractus Bickel & Wei, 1996
- Amblypsilopus bradleii (Van Duzee, 1915)
- Amblypsilopus bredini (Robinson, 1975)
- Amblypsilopus brevitibia Bickel, 1994
- Amblypsilopus brorstromae Bickel, 2009
- Amblypsilopus bruneli Grichanov, 1998
- Amblypsilopus byrnei Bickel, 1994
- Amblypsilopus cahillensis Bickel, 1994
- Amblypsilopus cakaudrove Bickel, 2009
- Amblypsilopus californicus (Steyskal, 1966)
- Amblypsilopus callainus Bickel, 1994
- Amblypsilopus canungra Bickel, 1994
- Amblypsilopus capillimanus (Enderlein, 1912)
- Amblypsilopus capitatus Yang, 1997
- Amblypsilopus careelensis Bickel, 1994
- Amblypsilopus castus (Loew, 1866)
- Amblypsilopus centralis (Becker, 1923)
- Amblypsilopus cephalodinus Yang, 1998
- Amblypsilopus cilicostatus (Van Duzee, 1927)
- Amblypsilopus cilifrons (Parent, 1937)
- Amblypsilopus ciliipennis (Aldrich, 1901)
- Amblypsilopus cincinnatus Bickel, 1994
- Amblypsilopus cobourgensis Bickel, 1994
- Amblypsilopus commoni Bickel, 1994
- Amblypsilopus cooki Bickel, 1994
- Amblypsilopus coronatus Yang & Yang, 2003
- Amblypsilopus cosmochirus (Bezzi, 1928)
- Amblypsilopus costalis (Aldrich, 1904)
- Amblypsilopus crassatus Yang, 1997
- Amblypsilopus cursus Bickel, 1994
- Amblypsilopus curvus Liu, Zhu & Yang, 2012
- Amblypsilopus cuthbertsoni (Parent, 1937)
- Amblypsilopus cyplus Bickel, 1994
- Amblypsilopus dallastai Grichanov, 1998
- Amblypsilopus decoratus (Becker, 1922)
- Amblypsilopus decoripes (Robinson, 1975)
- Amblypsilopus delectabilis (Parent, 1932)
- Amblypsilopus depilis Bickel & Sinclair, 1997
- Amblypsilopus dequierosi Bickel, 2009
- Amblypsilopus didymus Yang, 1997
- Amblypsilopus digitatus Wang, Zhu, Yang, 2012
- Amblypsilopus dimidiatus (Loew, 1862)
- Amblypsilopus disjunctus (Parent, 1936)
- Amblypsilopus dominicensis (Robinson, 1975)
- Amblypsilopus donhi Bickel, 1994
- Amblypsilopus dorsalis (Loew, 1866)
- Amblypsilopus edwardsi Bickel, 1994
- Amblypsilopus elaquarae Bickel, 2009
- Amblypsilopus elatus Bickel, 2009
- Amblypsilopus elegans (Walker, 1852)
- Amblypsilopus ellisi (Hollis, 1964)
- Amblypsilopus eotrogon Bickel, 1994
- Amblypsilopus eupulvillatus (Parent, 1928)
- Amblypsilopus exul (Parent, 1932)
- Amblypsilopus falcatus (Becker, 1922)
- Amblypsilopus fasciatus (Curran, 1924)
- Amblypsilopus fianarantsoa Grichanov, 2021
- Amblypsilopus filitarsis (Parent, 1935)
- Amblypsilopus flabellifer (Becker, 1923)
- Amblypsilopus flagellaris (Frey, 1925)
- Amblypsilopus flavellus Wang, Zhu & Yang, 2012
- Amblypsilopus flaviappendiculatus (De Meijere, 1910)
- Amblypsilopus flavicercus Zhu & Yang, 2011
- Amblypsilopus flavicornis (Aldrich, 1896)
- Amblypsilopus flavidus (Aldrich, 1896)
- Amblypsilopus flavipes (De Meijere, 1910)
- Amblypsilopus flavus (Vanschuytbroeck, 1962)
- Amblypsilopus floridanus (Harmston, 1971)
- Amblypsilopus fonsecai Bickel, 1994
- Amblypsilopus fonticolus Bickel, 1994
- Amblypsilopus fortescuia Bickel, 1994
- Amblypsilopus freidbergi Grichanov, 2021
- Amblypsilopus friedmani Grichanov, 2021
- Amblypsilopus fruticosus (Becker, 1922)
- Amblypsilopus fuscinervis (Van Duzee, 1926)
- Amblypsilopus fustis Bickel, 1994
- Amblypsilopus gabonensis Grichanov, 2022
- Amblypsilopus gapensis Bickel, 1994
- Amblypsilopus gilvipes (Enderlein, 1912)
- Amblypsilopus glaciunguis Bickel, 1994
- Amblypsilopus gnathoura Bickel, 2009
- Amblypsilopus gorodkovi Grichanov, 1996
- Amblypsilopus gracilitarsis (De Meijere, 1914)
- Amblypsilopus graciliventris (Parent, 1933)
- Amblypsilopus grallator (Frey, 1924)
- Amblypsilopus gravipes (Becker, 1922)
- Amblypsilopus gressitti Bickel, 1994
- Amblypsilopus grootaerti Grichanov, 1998
- Amblypsilopus guangxiensis Yang, 1998
- Amblypsilopus guntheri Bickel, 1994
- Amblypsilopus hainanensis Bickel & Wei, 1996
- Amblypsilopus henanensis Yang & Saigusa, 2000
- Amblypsilopus honiarensis Bickel, 2009
- Amblypsilopus hubeiensis Yang & Yang, 1997
- Amblypsilopus humilis (Becker, 1922)
- Amblypsilopus ialibu Bickel, 2019
- Amblypsilopus ibiscorum Bickel, 2009
- Amblypsilopus ibiscorum Bickel, 2019 (homonym of previous)
- Amblypsilopus ignobilis (Becker, 1922)
- Amblypsilopus imitans (Becker, 1922)
- Amblypsilopus inaequalis (Van Duzee, 1927)
- Amblypsilopus infans (Becker, 1922)
- Amblypsilopus infumatus (Aldrich, 1901)
- Amblypsilopus insensibile (Yang, 1995)
- Amblypsilopus interdictus (Becker, 1922)
- Amblypsilopus josephi Meuffels & Grootaert, 1999
- Amblypsilopus julius Bickel, 1994
- Amblypsilopus jullatensis Bickel, 1994
- Amblypsilopus kaindi Bickel, 2019
- Amblypsilopus kakaduensis Bickel, 1994
- Amblypsilopus kaplanae Grichanov, 1999
- Amblypsilopus kaputar Bickel, 1994
- Amblypsilopus kilaka Bickel, 2009
- Amblypsilopus knorri Grichanov, 1999
- Amblypsilopus korotyaevi Grichanov, 2021
- Amblypsilopus kotoi Bickel, 2009
- Amblypsilopus kraussi Grichanov, 1998
- Amblypsilopus lacduonganus Li, Li & Yang, 2013
- Amblypsilopus lakeba Bickel, 2009
- Amblypsilopus latifacies (Van Duzee, 1934)
- Amblypsilopus latilamellatus (Parent, 1934)
- Amblypsilopus laui Bickel, 2009
- Amblypsilopus lenakel Bickel, 2006
- Amblypsilopus lenga (Curran, 1929)
- Amblypsilopus leonidi Grichanov, 2021
- Amblypsilopus leptopus Meuffels & Grootaert, 1999
- Amblypsilopus liangi Tang, Zhu & Yang, 2019
- Amblypsilopus liaoae Zhu & Yang, 2011
- Amblypsilopus liepae Bickel, 1994
- Amblypsilopus liratus Tang, Zhu & Yang, 2019
- Amblypsilopus lismorensis Bickel, 1994
- Amblypsilopus liui Zhu & Yang, 2011
- Amblypsilopus lobatus (De Meijere, 1916)
- Amblypsilopus longifilus (Becker, 1923)
- Amblypsilopus longipes (Van Duzee, 1929)
- Amblypsilopus longiseta Yang & Saigusa, 2000
- Amblypsilopus longus Li, Li & Yang, 2013
- Amblypsilopus longwanganus Yang, 1997
- Amblypsilopus loriensis Bickel, 1994
- Amblypsilopus luteus (Robinson, 1975)
- Amblypsilopus macula (Wiedemann, 1830)
- Amblypsilopus macularivena (Irwin, 1974)
- Amblypsilopus madagascariensis (Vanschuytbroeck, 1952)
- Amblypsilopus malensis Bickel, 1994
- Amblypsilopus marginatus Tang, Zhu & Yang, 2019
- Amblypsilopus marikai Bickel, 2009
- Amblypsilopus marinae Grichanov, 2021
- Amblypsilopus marskeae Runyon, 2020
- Amblypsilopus martini Grichanov, 2022
- Amblypsilopus maulevu Bickel, 2006
- Amblypsilopus medianus (Becker, 1922)
- Amblypsilopus medogensis Tang, Zhu & Yang, 2019
- Amblypsilopus medvedevi Grichanov, 1996
- Amblypsilopus megastoma Bickel, 2019
- Amblypsilopus melasma Bickel, 1994
- Amblypsilopus mensualis Bickel, 1994
- Amblypsilopus mexicanus (Aldrich, 1901)
- Amblypsilopus milleri Grichanov, 2022
- Amblypsilopus miser (Parent, 1935)
- Amblypsilopus moggillensis Bickel, 1994
- Amblypsilopus mollis (Parent, 1932)
- †Amblypsilopus monicae Bickel in Bickel & Solórzano Kraemer, 2016
- Amblypsilopus montanorum Bickel, 1994
- Amblypsilopus mufindiensis Grichanov, 2022
- Amblypsilopus munroi (Curran, 1924)
- Amblypsilopus mutandus (Becker, 1922)
- Amblypsilopus mutatus (Becker, 1922)
- Amblypsilopus nambourensis Bickel, 1994
- Amblypsilopus nanus (Parent, 1929)
- Amblypsilopus nartshukae Grichanov, 1996
- Amblypsilopus natalis Bickel, 1994
- Amblypsilopus navatadoi Bickel, 2009
- Amblypsilopus navukailagi Bickel, 2009
- Amblypsilopus neoparvus (Dyte, 1975)
- Amblypsilopus neoplatypus Bickel, 1994
- Amblypsilopus nigricercus Zhu & Yang, 2011
- Amblypsilopus nigrimanus (Van Duzee, 1914)
- Amblypsilopus nimbuwah Bickel, 1994
- Amblypsilopus niphas Bickel, 2009
- Amblypsilopus niupani Bickel, 2009
- Amblypsilopus nivanuatorum Bickel, 2009
- Amblypsilopus noditarsis (Becker, 1922)
- Amblypsilopus okapa Bickel, 2019
- Amblypsilopus olgae Grichanov, 2021
- Amblypsilopus olsoni Bickel, 2009
- Amblypsilopus oscillans (Parent, 1935)
- Amblypsilopus pallidicornis (Grimshaw, 1901)
- Amblypsilopus pallidus (De Meijere, 1910)
- Amblypsilopus papaveroi (Milward de Azevedo, 1986)
- Amblypsilopus papillifer Bickel, 1994
- Amblypsilopus paramonovi Bickel, 1994
- Amblypsilopus parrai (Milward de Azevedo, 1985)
- Amblypsilopus parvus (Van Duzee, 1933)
- Amblypsilopus pascali Bickel, 2019
- Amblypsilopus pectinatus (De Meijere, 1910)
- Amblypsilopus pectoralis (De Meijere, 1913)
- Amblypsilopus pediformis (Becker, 1922)
- Amblypsilopus penaoru Bickel, 2009
- Amblypsilopus penicillatus (Becker, 1922)
- Amblypsilopus perniger (Becker, 1923)
- Amblypsilopus pilosus (Negrobov, 1979)
- Amblypsilopus planipes (Van Duzee, 1929)
- Amblypsilopus pollinosus (Van Duzee, 1915)
- Amblypsilopus ponapensis Bickel, 1994
- Amblypsilopus praecipuus (Milward de Azevedo, 1985)
- Amblypsilopus prysjonesi (Meuffels & Grootaert, 2007)
- Amblypsilopus pseudexul Bickel, 1994
- Amblypsilopus psittacinus (Loew, 1861)
- Amblypsilopus pulverulentus (Parent, 1939)
- Amblypsilopus pulvillatus (Bezzi, 1928)
- Amblypsilopus pusillus (Macquart, 1842)
- Amblypsilopus putealis Bickel, 1994
- Amblypsilopus qaraui Bickel, 2009
- Amblypsilopus qianensis Wei & Song, 2005
- Amblypsilopus qinlingensis Yang & Saigusa, 2005
- Amblypsilopus quinquepetalus Tang, Zhu & Yang, 2019
- Amblypsilopus quldensis Bickel, 1994
- Amblypsilopus raculei Bickel, 2009
- Amblypsilopus ranomafana Grichanov, 2004
- Amblypsilopus ratawai Bickel, 2009
- Amblypsilopus renschi (Parent, 1932)
- Amblypsilopus rentzi Bickel, 1994
- Amblypsilopus retrovena (Irwin, 1974)
- Amblypsilopus reunionensis Grichanov, 2004
- Amblypsilopus rezendei (Milward de Azevedo, 1985)
- Amblypsilopus rimbija Bickel, 1994
- Amblypsilopus riuensis Bickel, 2019
- Amblypsilopus romani Grichanov, 2021
- Amblypsilopus rosaceus (Wiedemann, 1824)
- Amblypsilopus rotundiceps (Aldrich, 1904)
- Amblypsilopus ruchini Grichanov, 2021
- Amblypsilopus sabroskyi Bickel, 1994
- Amblypsilopus sanjanae Bickel, 2009
- Amblypsilopus sanyanus Yang, 1998
- Amblypsilopus scintillans (Loew, 1861)
- Amblypsilopus septentrionalis Bickel, 1994
- Amblypsilopus seticoxa (De Meijere, 1914)
- Amblypsilopus setosus Zhu & Yang, 2011
- Amblypsilopus sichuanensis Yang, 1997
- Amblypsilopus sideroros Bickel, 1994
- Amblypsilopus signatus (Becker, 1923)
- Amblypsilopus simplex (De Meijere, 1910)
- Amblypsilopus sounwari Bickel, 2009
- Amblypsilopus spiniscapus Grichanov, 2022
- Amblypsilopus steelei Grichanov, 1996
- Amblypsilopus striaticollis (Becker, 1922)
- Amblypsilopus stuckenbergi (Vanschuytbroeck, 1957)
- Amblypsilopus stuckenbergorum (Irwin, 1974)
- Amblypsilopus subabruptus Bickel & Wei, 1996
- Amblypsilopus subtilis (Becker, 1924)
- Amblypsilopus superans (Walker, 1860)
- Amblypsilopus svenhedini (Parent, 1936)
- Amblypsilopus takamaka Grichanov, 2004
- Amblypsilopus tenuicauda (Parent, 1936)
- Amblypsilopus tenuipes (Becker, 1922)
- Amblypsilopus tenuitarsis (De Meijere, 1913)
- Amblypsilopus terriae Bickel, 2009
- Amblypsilopus tinarooensis Bickel, 1994
- Amblypsilopus topendensis Bickel, 1994
- Amblypsilopus tortus Bickel, 1994
- Amblypsilopus tozerensis Bickel, 1994
- Amblypsilopus trahens (Frey, 1925)
- Amblypsilopus triduum Bickel, 1994
- Amblypsilopus triscuticatus (Hardy, 1930)
- Amblypsilopus trogon Bickel, 1994
- Amblypsilopus trudis Bickel, 1994
- Amblypsilopus trukensis Bickel, 1994
- Amblypsilopus turbidus (Becker, 1922)
- Amblypsilopus turcicus Tonguc & Grootaert, 2013
- Amblypsilopus udzungwensis Grichanov, 2022
- Amblypsilopus uneorum Bickel, 1994
- Amblypsilopus ungulatus (Parent, 1941)
- Amblypsilopus unicinctus (Van Duzee, 1927)
- Amblypsilopus unicoiensis (Robinson, 1964)
- Amblypsilopus unifasciatus (Say, 1823)
- Amblypsilopus upolu Bickel, 2006
- Amblypsilopus uptoni Bickel, 1994
- Amblypsilopus variabilis (De Meijere, 1913)
- Amblypsilopus variegatus (Loew, 1861)
- Amblypsilopus variipes (Frey, 1925)
- Amblypsilopus veisari Bickel, 2009
- Amblypsilopus ventralis Wang, Zhu & Yang, 2012
- Amblypsilopus volivoli Bickel, 2006
- Amblypsilopus vusasivo Bickel, 2009
- Amblypsilopus waiseai Bickel, 2006
- Amblypsilopus waivudawa Bickel, 2009
- Amblypsilopus walkeri Bickel, 1994
- Amblypsilopus waqai Bickel, 2009
- Amblypsilopus webbensis Bickel, 1994
- Amblypsilopus weii Grichanov, 1999
- Amblypsilopus wellsae Bickel, 1994
- Amblypsilopus williamsi Bickel, 1994
- Amblypsilopus wokoensis Bickel, 1994
- Amblypsilopus wolffi Bickel, 2009
- Amblypsilopus wongabelensis Bickel, 1994
- Amblypsilopus xizangensis Yang, 1998
- Amblypsilopus yunnanensis Yang, 1998
- Amblypsilopus zhejiangensis Yang, 1997
- Amblypsilopus zonatus (Parent, 1932)
- Amblypsilopus zucchii (Milward de Azevedo, 1885)

Unrecognised species:

- Amblypsilopus brunnescens (Becker, 1922)
- Amblypsilopus oldroydi (Haider, 1957)
- Amblypsilopus parallelinervis (Parent, 1935)
- Amblypsilopus parvulus (Parent, 1934)
- Amblypsilopus segnis (Parent, 1934)
- Amblypsilopus soror (Parent, 1934)

Species considered nomina dubia:

- Amblypsilopus flavicollis (Becker, 1923)
- Amblypsilopus rectangularis (Parent, 1937)
- Amblypsilopus sudanensis (Parent, 1939)
- Amblypsilopus tropicalis (Parent, 1933)

Species transferred to Chrysosoma:

- Amblypsilopus subfascipennis (Curran, 1926)

Species that are now synonyms:

- Amblypsilopus asper (Parent, 1933): synonym of Amblypsilopus bevisi (Curran, 1927)
- Amblypsilopus janatus (Negrobov, 1984): synonym of Amblypsilopus pilosus (Negrobov, 1979)
- Amblypsilopus sinensis Yang & Yang, 2003: synonym of Amblypsilopus subabruptus Bickel & Wei, 1996
