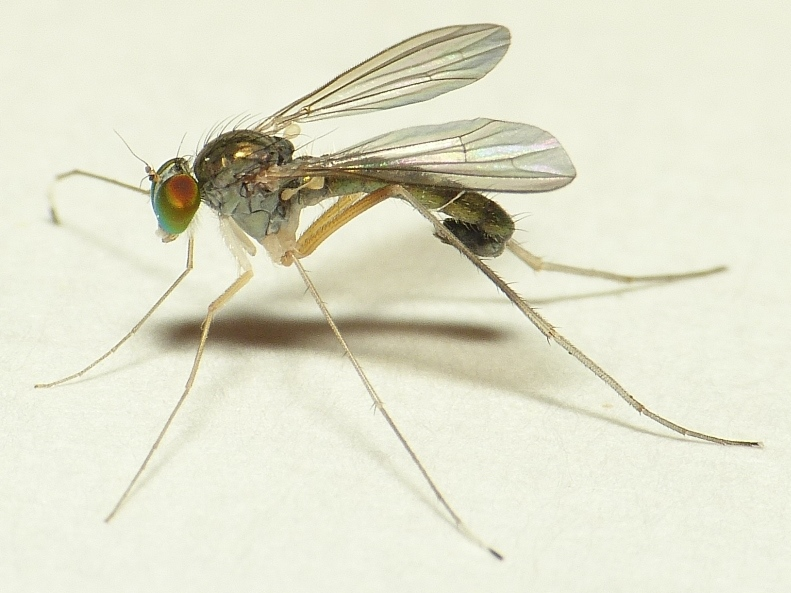
- Sciapus platypterus Netherlands

Scientific classification
- Kingdom: Animalia
- Phylum: Arthropoda
- Class: Insecta
- Order: Diptera
- Family: Dolichopodidae
- Subfamily: Sciapodinae
- Tribe: Sciapodini
- Genus: Sciapus
- Species: S. platypterus

Binomial name
- Sciapus platypterus (Fabricius, 1805)

Synonyms
- Dolichopus platypterus Fabricius, 1805; Leptopus tipularius Fallén, 1823; Psilopus crinipes Meigen, 1830

= Sciapus platypterus =

Species of fly

Sciapus platypterus is a species of fly in the family Dolichopodidae. It is found in the Palearctic.
