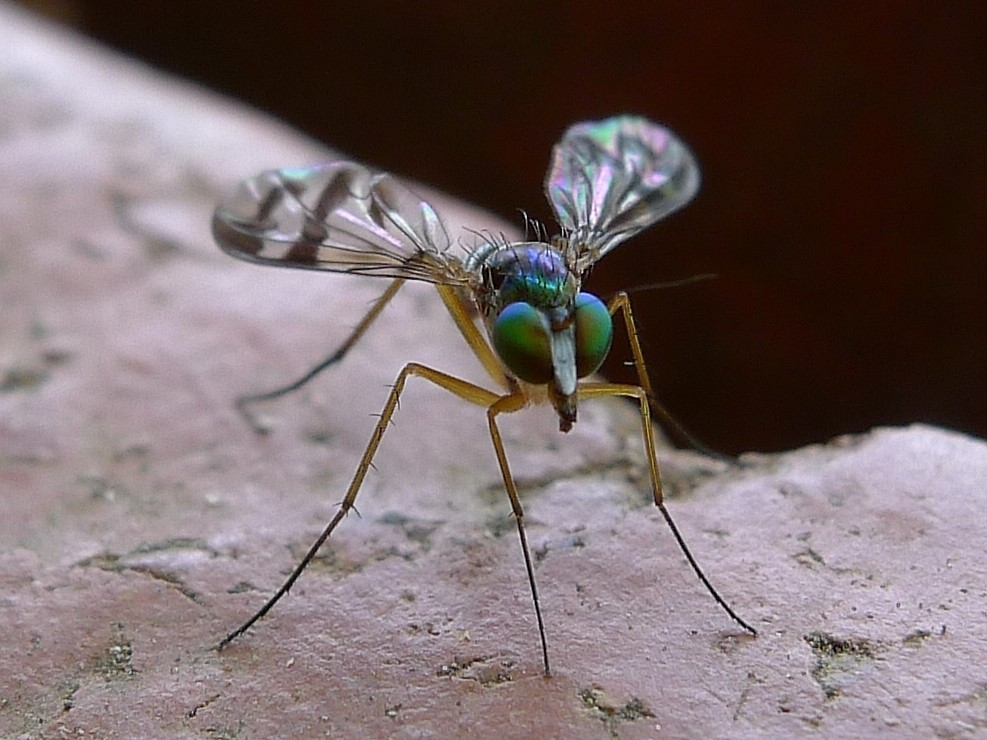

Scientific classification
- Kingdom: Animalia
- Phylum: Arthropoda
- Class: Insecta
- Order: Diptera
- Family: Dolichopodidae
- Subfamily: Sciapodinae
- Tribe: Chrysosomatini
- Genus: Heteropsilopus; Bigot, 1859

Type species
- Psilopus grandis (= Psilopus cingulipes Walker, 1835) Macquart, 1850

= Heteropsilopus =

Genus of flies

Heteropsilopus is a genus of flies in the family Dolichopodidae. The genus comprises large-sized sciapodines mostly with a strongly sinuate m-cu and simple digitiform cercus. The strongly sinuate m-cu is considered to be a distinctive group autapomorphy.

== Distribution ==
Heteropsilopus is divided into three species groups: the triligatus group of southern India and Sri Lanka, and the cingulipes and brevicornis groups of southern Australia and Tasmania. Both Indian and Australian species are similar. Development of similar characters on some species, such as the stub-vein on m-cu, further unites the two disjunct groups. The separation of Heteropsilopus into Australian and Indian groups is more a matter of geographical convenience than sharp morphological difference.

The disjunction of Heteropsilopus in Australia and India suggests a widespread eastern Gondwanan distribution in place during the Lower Cretaceous.

In India the genus is restricted to mountains above 900 m in the elevated physiographic region of the 'Western Ghats' or 'Southern Blocks', and is unknown from the lowlands.

== Species ==
- Heteropsilopus adhaerens (Becker, 1922)
- Heteropsilopus araluensis Bickel, 1994
- Heteropsilopus brevicornis (Macquart, 1850)
- Heteropsilopus brindabellensis Bickel, 1994
- Heteropsilopus caelicus (Parent, 1932)
- Heteropsilopus calabyi Bickel, 1994
- Heteropsilopus cingulipes (Walker, 1835)
- Heteropsilopus dilutus (Parent, 1937)
- Heteropsilopus hilaris (Parent, 1941)
- Heteropsilopus indicus (Parent, 1934)
- Heteropsilopus ingenuus (Erichson, 1842)
- Heteropsilopus intermedius Bickel, 1994
- Heteropsilopus khooi Bickel, 1994
- Heteropsilopus meensis Bickel, 1994
- Heteropsilopus persuadens (Becker, 1922)
- Heteropsilopus plumifer (Becker, 1922)
- Heteropsilopus poecilus (Becker, 1922)
- Heteropsilopus protarsatus (Parent, 1937)
- Heteropsilopus protervus (Parent, 1941)
- Heteropsilopus pulcherrimus (Becker, 1922)
- Heteropsilopus savicensis Bickel, 1994
- Heteropsilopus sigmatinervis (Parent, 1937)
- Heteropsilopus squamifer Hardy, 1958
- Heteropsilopus stragulus (Becker, 1922)
- Heteropsilopus sugdeni Bickel, 1994
- Heteropsilopus tantanoola Bickel, 1994
- Heteropsilopus trifasciatus (Macquart, 1850)
- Heteropsilopus triligatus (Becker, 1922)
- Heteropsilopus tweedensis Bickel, 1994
- Heteropsilopus vanus (Parent, 1941)
- Heteropsilopus yunnanensis Liu, Zhu & Yang, 2012
