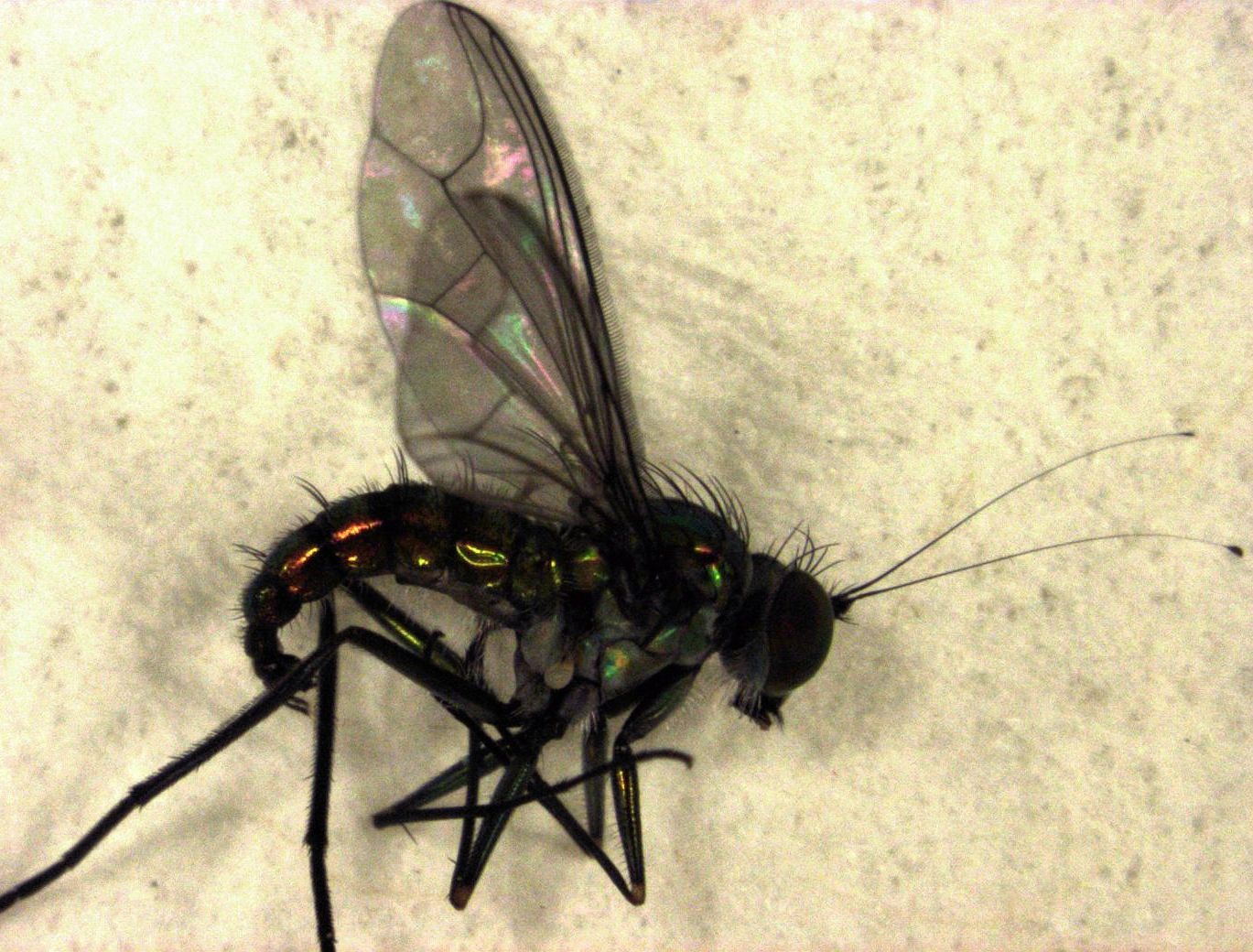
- Parentia mobilis (male)

Scientific classification
- Kingdom: Animalia
- Phylum: Arthropoda
- Class: Insecta
- Order: Diptera
- Family: Dolichopodidae
- Subfamily: Sciapodinae
- Tribe: Chrysosomatini
- Genus: Parentia; Hardy, 1935

Type species
- Condylostylus separatus Parent, 1932

= Parentia =

Genus of flies

Parentia is a large genus of flies in the family Dolichopodidae.

== Species ==
- Parentia agama Bickel, 2002
- Parentia angustipennis (Loew, 1858)
- Parentia anomalicosta Bickel, 1992
- Parentia aotearoa Bickel, 1992
- Parentia argenticauda Bickel, 2002
- Parentia argentifrons Bickel, 1992
- Parentia asymmetrica Grichanov, 2000
- Parentia backyama Bickel, 1994
- Parentia barbarae Bickel, 1994
- Parentia bourail Bickel, 2002
- Parentia bourgoini Bickel, 2002
- Parentia cagiae Bickel, 2006
- Parentia caldyanup Bickel, 1994
- Parentia calignosa Bickel, 1992
- Parentia cardaleae Bickel, 1994
- Parentia caudisetae Bickel, 2002
- Parentia chaineyi Bickel, 1994
- Parentia chathamensis Bickel, 1992
- Parentia cilifoliata (Parent, 1933)
- Parentia defecta Bickel, 1992
- Parentia degener (Parent, 1934)
- Parentia dispar (Macquart, 1850)
- Parentia do Bickel, 2002
- Parentia dongara Bickel, 1994
- Parentia dubia (Parent, 1929)
- Parentia fuscata (Hutton, 1901)
- Parentia gemmans (Walker, 1849)
- Parentia gemmata (Walker, 1849)
- Parentia gladicauda Bickel, 1994
- Parentia griseicollis (Becker, 1922)
- Parentia hollowayi Bickel, 2002
- Parentia incomitata Bickel, 2002
- Parentia insularis Bickel, 1992
- Parentia johnsi Bickel, 1992
- Parentia kelseyi Bickel, 1994
- Parentia kiwarrak Bickel, 1994
- Parentia lamellata Bickel, 2002
- Parentia lydiae Bickel, 2002
- Parentia lyra Bickel, 1992
- Parentia magnicornis Grichanov, 2021
- Parentia magniseta Bickel, 1992
- Parentia malitiosa (Hutton, 1901)
- Parentia milleri (Parent, 1933)
- Parentia mobilis (Hutton, 1901)
- Parentia modesta (Parent, 1933)
- Parentia nigropilosa (Macquart, 1847)
- Parentia nova (Parent, 1933)
- Parentia nudicosta Bickel, 1994
- Parentia occidentalis Bickel, 1994
- Parentia october Bickel, 2002
- Parentia orientalis Bickel, 1994
- Parentia ouenguip Bickel, 2002
- Parentia paniensis Bickel, 2002
- Parentia pernodensis Bickel, 2002
- Parentia perthensis Bickel, 1994
- Parentia pukakiensis Bickel, 1992
- Parentia recticosta (Parent, 1933)
- Parentia restricta (Hutton, 1901)
- Parentia royallensis Bickel, 1994
- Parentia sarramea Bickel, 2002
- Parentia schlingeri Bickel, 1992
- Parentia solaris Bickel, 1994
- Parentia stenura (Loew, 1858)
- Parentia substenura Grichanov, 1999
- Parentia theroni Grichanov, 2021
- Parentia timothyei Bickel, 1994
- Parentia tinda Bickel, 1994
- Parentia titirangi Bickel, 1992
- Parentia tonnoiri (Parent, 1933)
- Parentia tricenta Bickel, 2002
- Parentia tricolor (Walker, 1835)
- Parentia varifemorata Bickel, 1992
- Parentia vulgaris Bickel, 1994
- Parentia webbi Bickel, 2002
- Parentia whirinaki Bickel, 1992
- Parentia wilhelmensis Bickel in Bickel & Martin, 2016
- Parentia yarragil Bickel, 1994
- Parentia yeatesi Bickel, 1994
- Parentia yunensis Bickel, 1994
