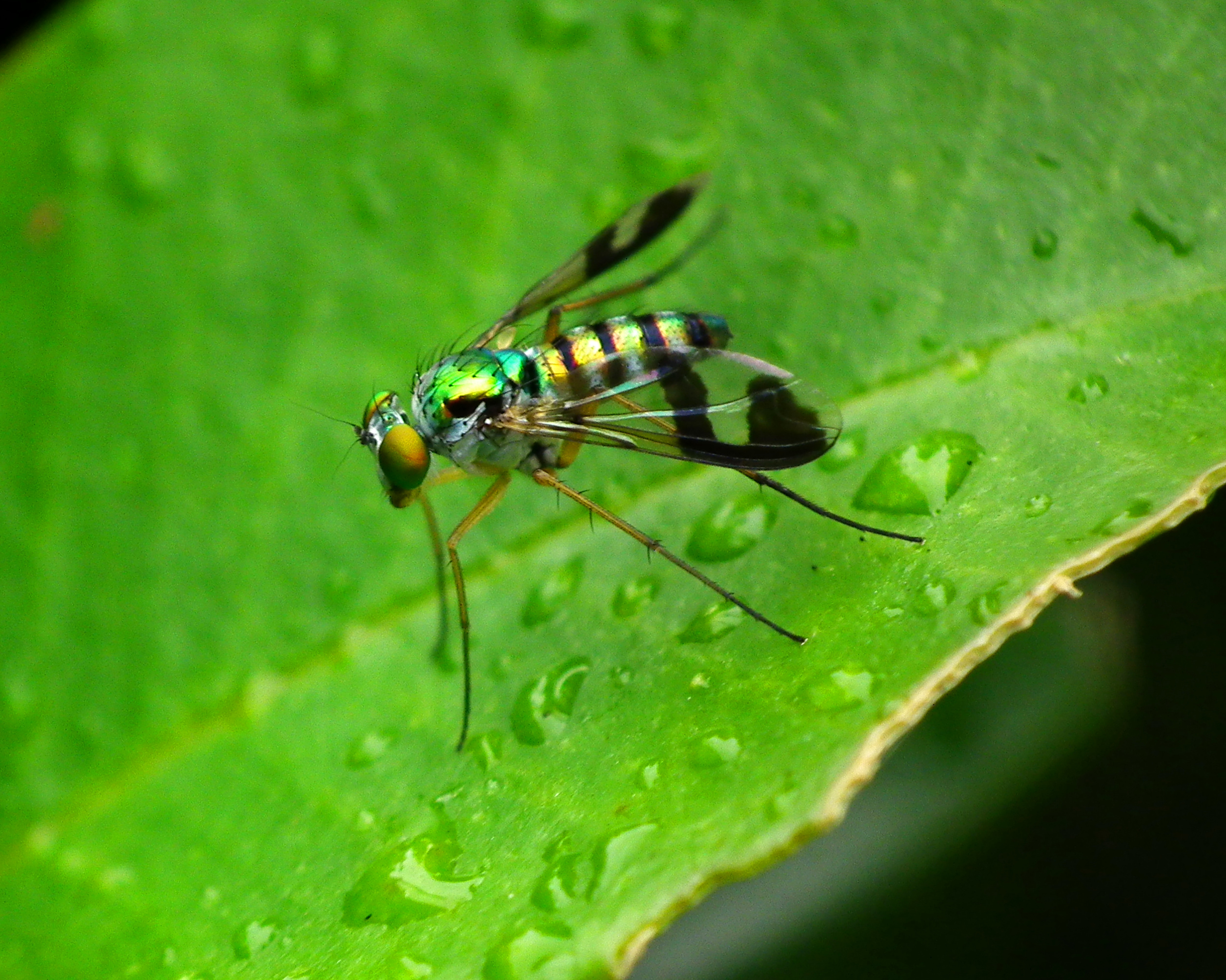
- Austrosciapus connexus

Scientific classification
- Kingdom: Animalia
- Phylum: Arthropoda
- Clade: Pancrustacea
- Class: Insecta
- Order: Diptera
- Family: Dolichopodidae
- Subfamily: Sciapodinae
- Tribe: Chrysosomatini
- Genus: Austrosciapus; Bickel, 1994

Type species
- Sciapus proximus Parent, 1928

= Austrosciapus =

Genus of flies

Austrosciapus is a genus of flies in the family Dolichopodidae. It is mainly found in Australia, though some species are also known from New Zealand, French Polynesia, Norfolk Island and the Hawaiian Islands.

== Gallery ==
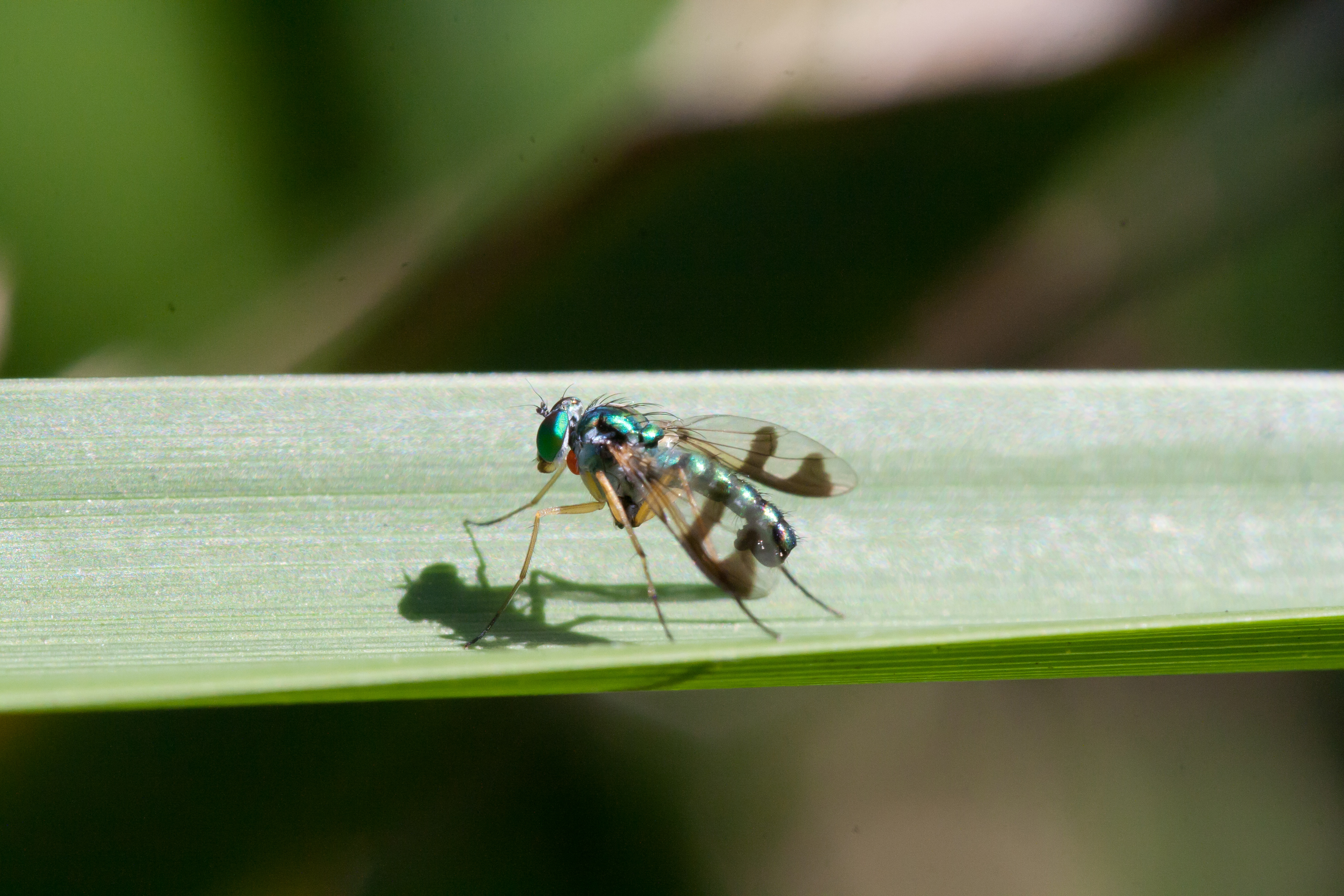
Austrosciapus fly in Kioloa, New South Wales

== Species ==
- Austrosciapus actensis Bickel, 1994
- Austrosciapus aprilis Bickel, 1994
- Austrosciapus ascitus Bickel, 1994
- Austrosciapus balli Bickel, 1994
- Austrosciapus bifarius (Becker, 1922)
- Austrosciapus broulensis Bickel, 1994
- Austrosciapus cantrelli Bickel, 1994
- Austrosciapus capricornis Bickel, 1994
- Austrosciapus cassisi Bickel, 1994
- Austrosciapus collessi Bickel, 1994
- Austrosciapus connexus (Walker, 1835)
- Austrosciapus crater Bickel, 1994
- Austrosciapus dayi Bickel, 1994
- Austrosciapus dekeyzeri Bickel, 1994
- Austrosciapus dendrohalma Bickel, 1994
- Austrosciapus discretifasciatus (Macquart, 1850)
- Austrosciapus doddi Bickel, 1994
- Austrosciapus flavicauda Bickel, 1994
- Austrosciapus frauci Bickel, 1994
- Austrosciapus fraudulosus Bickel, 1994
- Austrosciapus gwynnae Bickel, 1994
- Austrosciapus hollowayi Bickel, 1994
- Austrosciapus janae Bickel, 1994
- Austrosciapus kuborensis Bickel in Bickel & Martin, 2016
- Austrosciapus magus Bickel, 1994
- Austrosciapus minnamurra Bickel, 1994
- Austrosciapus muelleri Bickel, 1994
- Austrosciapus nellae Bickel, 1994
- Austrosciapus otfordensis Bickel, 1994
- Austrosciapus proximus (Parent, 1928)
- Austrosciapus pseudotumidus Bickel, 1994
- Austrosciapus pulvillus Bickel, 1994
- Austrosciapus quadrimaculatus (Parent, 1932)
- Austrosciapus ravenshoensis Bickel, 1994
- Austrosciapus riparius Bickel, 1994
- Austrosciapus sarinensis Bickel, 1994
- Austrosciapus solus Bickel, 1994
- Austrosciapus stevensi Bickel, 1994
- Austrosciapus storeyi Bickel, 1994
- Austrosciapus tooloomensis Bickel, 1994
- Austrosciapus triangulifer (Becker, 1922)
- Austrosciapus tumidus (Hardy, 1958)
- Austrosciapus zentae Bickel, 1994
