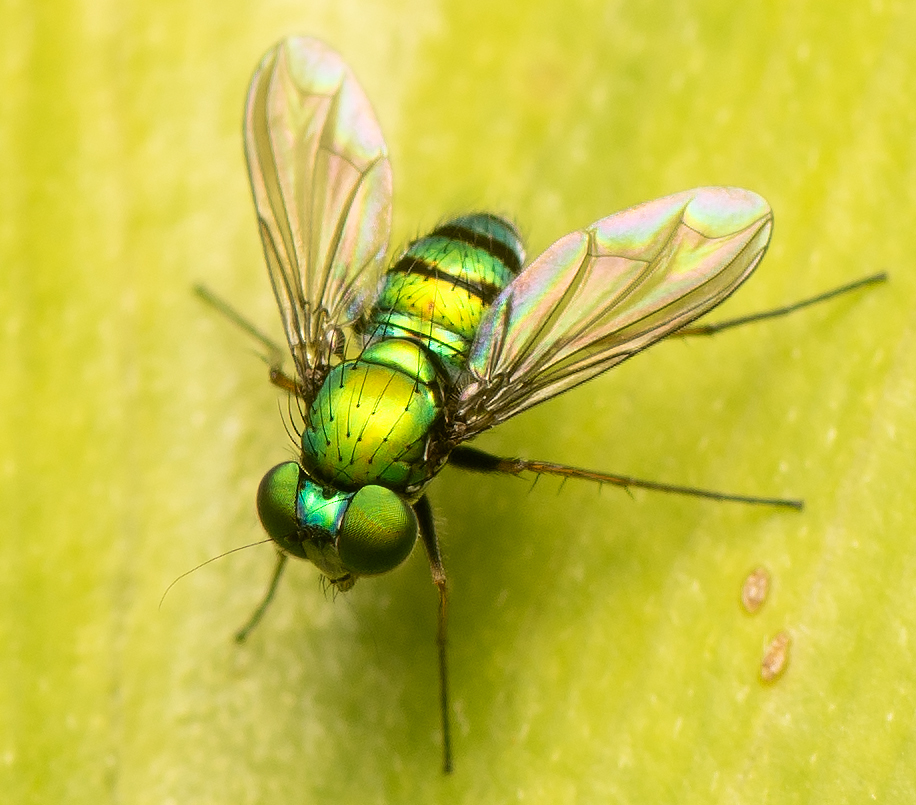
- Krakatauia macalpinei

Scientific classification
- Kingdom: Animalia
- Phylum: Arthropoda
- Class: Insecta
- Order: Diptera
- Family: Dolichopodidae
- Subfamily: Sciapodinae
- Tribe: Chrysosomatini
- Genus: Krakatauia; Enderlein, 1912

Type species
- Psilopus rectus Wiedemann, 1830

= Krakatauia =

Genus of flies

Krakatauia is a genus of flies in the family Dolichopodidae.

== Species ==
- Krakatauia abaca Bickel, 2008
- Krakatauia abbreviata (Becker, 1922)
- Krakatauia alanae Bickel, 1994
- Krakatauia anthracoides (Van der Wulp, 1896)
- Krakatauia auribarba Bickel, 2008
- Krakatauia barbescens (Parent, 1939)
- Krakatauia bisignata Bickel, 2008
- Krakatauia bouma Bickel, 2008
- Krakatauia cheesmanae Bickel, 2008
- Krakatauia cicia Bickel, 2008
- Krakatauia cinctiseta (Parent, 1935)
- Krakatauia claudiensis Bickel, 1994
- Krakatauia compressipes (Parent, 1939)
- Krakatauia digitula (Becker, 1922)
- Krakatauia epiensis Bickel, 2008
- Krakatauia evodevo Bickel, 2008
- Krakatauia evulgata (Becker, 1922)
- Krakatauia funeralis (Parent, 1933)
- Krakatauia graciosa Bickel, 2008
- Krakatauia hurleyi Bickel, 2008
- Krakatauia hutuna Bickel, 2008
- Krakatauia inflata (Becker, 1922)
- Krakatauia korobaba Bickel, 2008
- Krakatauia lamiensis Bickel, 2008
- Krakatauia latemaculata (Parent, 1939)
- Krakatauia luctuosa (Parent, 1928)
- Krakatauia macalpinei Bickel, 1994
- Krakatauia maculata (Parent, 1932)
- Krakatauia malakula Bickel, 2008
- Krakatauia malanda Bickel, 1994
- Krakatauia marginalis (Walker, 1861)
- Krakatauia micronesiana Bickel, 1994
- Krakatauia moanakaka Bickel, 2008
- Krakatauia namatalaui Bickel, 2008
- Krakatauia natewa Bickel, 2008
- Krakatauia navai Bickel, 2008
- Krakatauia nigrolimbata (De Meijere, 1913)
- Krakatauia nitidifacies (Parent, 1934)
- Krakatauia nupta (Bezzi, 1928)
- Krakatauia obversicornis Bickel, 1994
- Krakatauia ounua Bickel, 2008
- Krakatauia paracarbonea (Hollis, 1964)
- Krakatauia planticorum Bickel, 2008
- Krakatauia platychira (Frey, 1924)
- Krakatauia pseudofuneralis Bickel, 1994
- Krakatauia purpurascens (De Meijere, 1915)
- Krakatauia recta (Wiedemann, 1830)
- Krakatauia remota Bickel, 1994
- Krakatauia sericea (De Meijere, 1913)
- Krakatauia sigatoka Bickel, 2008
- Krakatauia solodamu Bickel, 2008
- Krakatauia tabulina (Becker, 1922)
- Krakatauia tanna Bickel, 2008
- Krakatauia tomaniivi Bickel, 2008
- Krakatauia trustorum Bickel, 1994
- Krakatauia vuda Bickel, 2008
