= Ethiosciapus =

Scientific classification
- Kingdom: Animalia
- Phylum: Arthropoda
- Class: Insecta
- Order: Diptera
- Family: Dolichopodidae
- Subfamily: Sciapodinae
- Tribe: Chrysosomatini
- Genus: Ethiosciapus; Bickel, 1994

Type species
- Psilopus bilobatus (= Psilopus flavirostris Loew, 1858) Lamb, 1922

Genus of flies

Ethiosciapus is a genus of flies in the family Dolichopodidae.

== Species ==
- Ethiosciapus bicalcaratus (Parent, 1933)
- Ethiosciapus exarmatus (Parent, 1933)
- Ethiosciapus finitimus (Parent, 1939)
- Ethiosciapus flavirostris (Loew, 1858)
- Ethiosciapus inflexus (Becker, 1923)
- Ethiosciapus latipes (Parent, 1929)

Species that are now synonyms:

- Ethiosciapus bilobatus (Lamb, 1922): synonym of Ethiosciapus flavirostris (Loew, 1858)
- Ethiosciapus dilectus (Parent, 1935): synonym of Ethiosciapus inflexus (Becker, 1923)
- Ethiosciapus integer (Becker, 1923): synonym of Ethiosciapus flavirostris (Loew, 1858)
