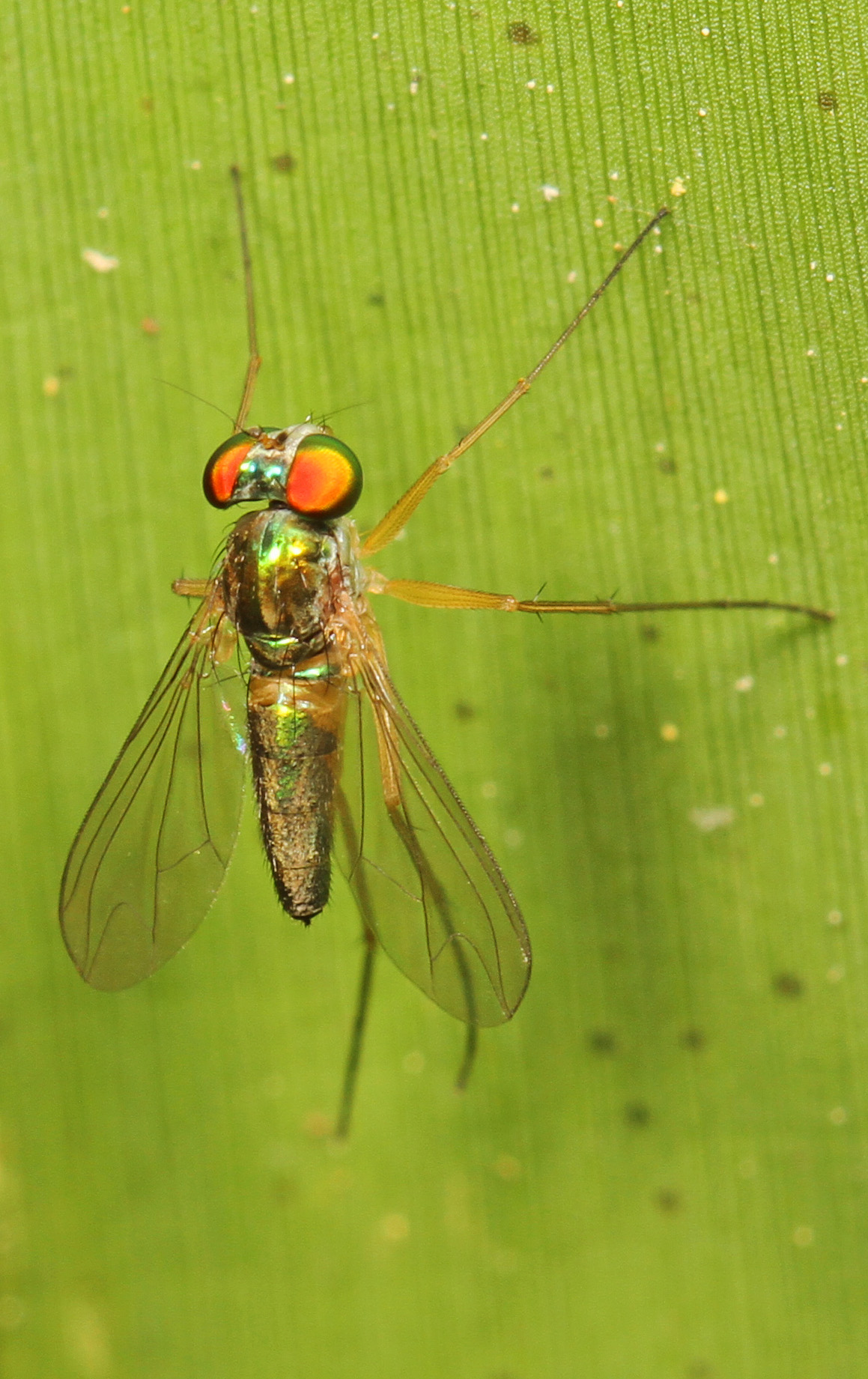
- Amblypsilopus sp.

Scientific classification
- Kingdom: Animalia
- Phylum: Arthropoda
- Clade: Pancrustacea
- Class: Insecta
- Order: Diptera
- Family: Dolichopodidae
- Subfamily: Sciapodinae
- Tribe: Chrysosomatini; Becker, 1918

Genera
- see text

= Chrysosomatini =

Tribe of flies

Chrysosomatini is a tribe of flies in the family Dolichopodidae.

== Genera ==
- Abbemyia Bickel, 1994
- Amblypsilopus Bigot, 1889
- Austrosciapus Bickel, 1994
- Bickeliolus Grichanov, 1996
- Chrysosoma Guérin-Méneville, 1831
- Ethiosciapus Bickel, 1994
- Gigantosciapus Grichanov, 1997
- Heteropsilopus Bigot, 1859
- Krakatauia Enderlein, 1912
- Lapita Bickel, 2002
- Parentia Hardy, 1935
- Plagiozopelma Enderlein, 1912
- Pseudoparentia Bickel, 1994
