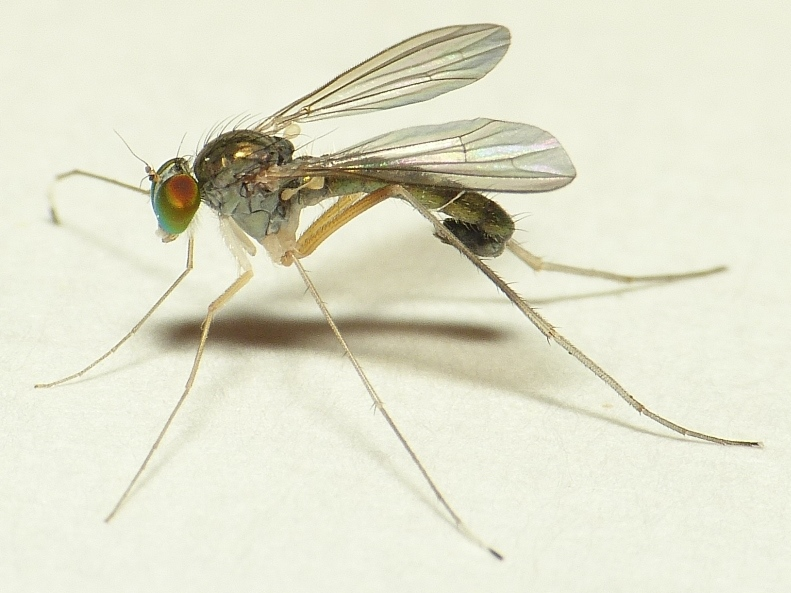
- Sciapus platypterus

Scientific classification
- Kingdom: Animalia
- Phylum: Arthropoda
- Class: Insecta
- Order: Diptera
- Family: Dolichopodidae
- Subfamily: Sciapodinae
- Tribe: Sciapodini
- Genus: Sciapus; Zeller, 1842

Type species
- Dolichopus platypterus Fabricius, 1805

Diversity
- about 82 species

Synonyms
- Leptopus Fallén, 1823 (Preocc.); Psilopus Meigen, 1824 (Preocc.); Stenarus Gistl, 1848; Psylopus Rondani, 1850 (Missp.); Psilopodius Rondani, 1861; Psilopodinus Bigot, 1888; Psilopiella Van Duzee, 1914; Sciopus Parent, 1925 (Missp.); Agastoplax Enderlein, 1936; Dactylodiscia Enderlein, 1936 (Unav.); Dactylorhipis Enderlein, 1936; Placantichir Enderlein, 1936 (Unav.); Dactylodiscia Anonymous in Imperial Institute of Entomology, 1937 (Preocc.); Placantichir Anonymous in Imperial Institute of Entomology, 1937

= Sciapus =

Genus of flies

Sciapus is a genus of long-legged flies in the family Dolichopodidae. There are about 82 described species in Sciapus.

== Gallery ==
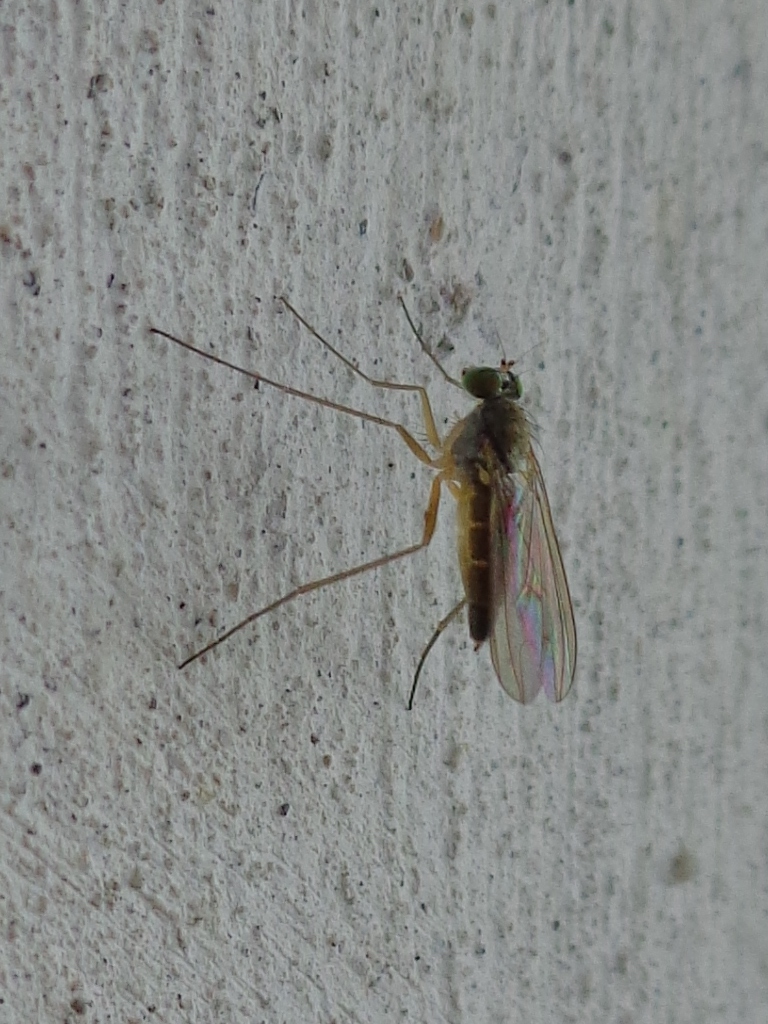
Sciapus contristans

== See also ==
- List of Sciapus species
