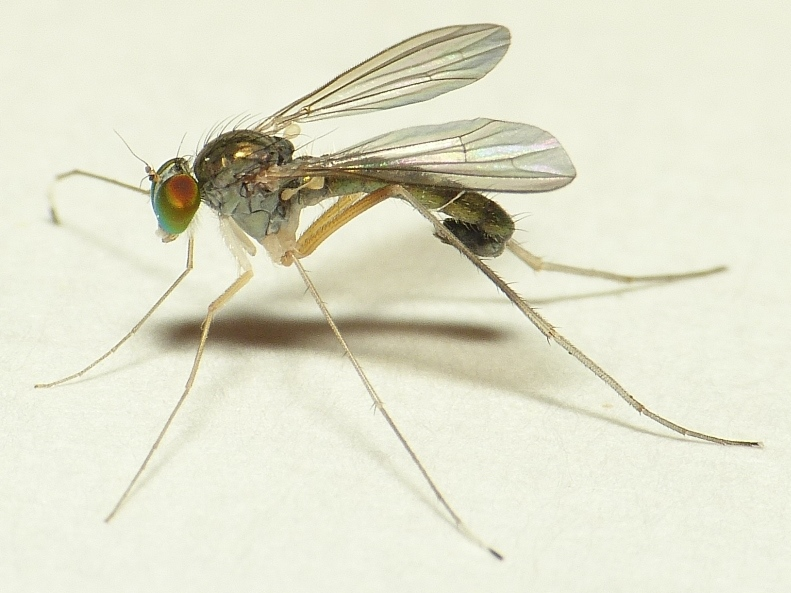
- Sciapus platypterus

Scientific classification
- Kingdom: Animalia
- Phylum: Arthropoda
- Clade: Pancrustacea
- Class: Insecta
- Order: Diptera
- Family: Dolichopodidae
- Subfamily: Sciapodinae; Becker, 1917

Genera
- see text

Synonyms
- Chrysosomatinae

= Sciapodinae =

Sciapodinae Temporal range: Eocene–Present

Subfamily of flies

Sciapodinae is a subfamily of flies in the family Dolichopodidae. Members of the subfamily possess several ancestral characteristics of the family, such as branched vein M_{1+2} in the wings (though M_{2} is absent or reduced in Mesorhagini) and a pedunculate hypopygium. Their heads also typically have a deeply excavated vertex (top of the head), giving them the appearance of a dumbbell when viewed from the front.

Members of Sciapodinae are most diverse in South America, sub-Saharan Africa, the Indian subcontinent, South-east Asia and Australasia. The subfamily is suggested to have originated during the Early Cretaceous on the supercontinent Gondwana, which is supported by vicariant distributions in the genera Heteropsilopus, Condylostylus and Parentia.

== Genera ==
- Tribe Mesorhagini Bickel, 1994
  - Amesorhaga Bickel, 1994
  - Mesorhaga Schiner, 1868
  - Negrobovia Bickel, 1994
- Tribe Sciapodini Becker, 1917
  - Bickelia Grichanov, 1996
  - Condylostylus Bigot, 1859
  - Dytomyia Bickel, 1994
  - Helixocerus Lamb, 1929
  - Mascaromyia Bickel, 1994
  - Narrabeenia Bickel, 1994
  - Naufraga Bickel, 1992
  - Pilbara Bickel, 1994
  - Sciapus Zeller, 1842
  - Sinosciapus Yang, 2001
- Tribe Chrysosomatini Becker, 1918
  - Abbemyia Bickel, 1994
  - Amblypsilopus Bigot, 1889
  - Austrosciapus Bickel, 1994
  - Bickeliolus Grichanov, 1996
  - Chrysosoma Guérin-Méneville, 1831
  - Ethiosciapus Bickel, 1994
  - Gigantosciapus Grichanov, 1997
  - Heteropsilopus Bigot, 1859
  - Krakatauia Enderlein, 1912
  - Lapita Bickel, 2002
  - Parentia Hardy, 1935
  - Plagiozopelma Enderlein, 1912
  - Pseudoparentia Bickel, 1994
- Pouebo Bickel, 2008
- †Wheelerenomyia Meunier, 1907
