= Aeropuerto =

Aeropuerto may refer to:

- Aeropuerto (Madrid), a ward in Spain
- Aeropuerto T1-T2-T3 (Madrid Metro), a station serving the Terminal 2 of the Madrid-Barajas Airport
- Aeropuerto T4 (Madrid Metro), a station serving the Terminal 4 of the Madrid-Barajas Airport
- Aeropuerto metro station, Panama City
- "Aeropuerto", a 2006 song by 2 Minutos
- Aeropuerto, the former name of Boulevard Puerto Aéreo metro station, in Mexico City
