= List of busiest airports by passenger traffic (2000–2009) =

The world's busiest airports by passenger traffic are measured by total passengers (data from Airports Council International), defined as passengers enplaned plus passengers deplaned plus direct-transit passengers. Hartsfield–Jackson Atlanta International Airport has been the world's busiest airport every year since 2000; with all airports combined, London has the world's busiest city airport system by passenger count. As of 2016, seven countries have at least two airports in the top 50; the United States of America has 16, China has 8 (including Hong Kong), and the United Kingdom, Japan, Germany, India, and Spain have two airports each.

== 2009 statistics ==
Airports Council International's final full year figures are as follows:

Rank	Airport	Location	Country	Code (IATA/ICAO)	Total passengers	Rank change	% change
1.	(United States) Hartsfield–Jackson Atlanta International Airport	Atlanta, Georgia	United States	ATL/KATL	88,032,086	Steady	▼2.2%
2.	(United Kingdom) London Heathrow Airport	Hillingdon, Greater London, England	United Kingdom	LHR/EGLL	66,037,578	▲1	▼1.5%
3.	(China) Beijing Capital International Airport	Chaoyang-Shunyi, Beijing	China	PEK/ZBAA	65,372,012	▲5	▲16.9%
4.	(United States) O'Hare International Airport	Chicago, Illinois	United States	ORD/KORD	64,158,343	▼2	▼6.1%
5.	(Japan) Tokyo Haneda Airport	Ōta, Tokyo	Japan	HND/RJTT	61,903,656	▼1	▼7.2%
6.	(France) Paris-Charles de Gaulle Airport	Roissy-en-France, Val d'Oise, Île-de-France	France	CDG/LFPG	57,906,866	▼1	▼4.9%
7.	(United States) Los Angeles International Airport	Los Angeles, California	United States	LAX/KLAX	56,520,843	▼1	▼5.5%
8.	(United States) Dallas/Fort Worth International Airport	Dallas–Fort Worth, Texas	United States	DFW/KDFW	56,030,457	▼1	▼1.9%
9.	(Germany) Frankfurt Airport	Frankfurt, Hesse	Germany	FRA/EDDF	50,932,840	Steady	▼4.7%
10.	(United States) Denver International Airport	Denver, Colorado	United States	DEN/KDEN	50,167,485	Steady	▼2.1%
11.	(Spain) Madrid-Barajas Airport	Barajas, Madrid	Spain	MAD/LEMD	48,250,784	Steady	▼5.1%
12.	(United States) John F. Kennedy International Airport	Queens, New York, New York	United States	JFK/KJFK	45,915,069	▲1	▼3.9%
13.	Hong Kong International Airport	Chek Lap Kok, Hong Kong	Hong Kong	HKG/VHHH	45,558,807	▼1	▼4.8%
14.	(Netherlands) Amsterdam Airport Schiphol	Haarlemmermeer, North Holland	Netherlands	AMS/EHAM	43,570,370	Steady	▼8.1%
15.	(United Arab Emirates) Dubai International Airport	Garhoud, Dubai	United Arab Emirates	DXB/OMDB	40,901,752	▲5	▲9.2%
16.	(Thailand) Suvarnabhumi Airport	Bang Phli, Samut Prakan	Thailand	BKK/VTBS	40,500,224	▲2	▲4.9%
17.	(United States) McCarran International Airport	Las Vegas, Nevada	United States	LAS/KLAS	40,469,012	▼2	▼6.3%
18.	(United States) George Bush Intercontinental Airport	Houston, Texas	United States	IAH/KIAH	40,007,354	▼2	▼4.1%
19.	(United States) Phoenix Sky Harbor International Airport	Phoenix, Arizona	United States	PHX/KPHX	37,824,982	▼2	▼5.2%
20.	(United States) San Francisco International Airport	San Mateo County, California	United States	SFO/KSFO	37,338,942	▲1	▲0.3%
21.	Singapore Changi Airport	Changi	Singapore	SIN/WSSS	37,203,978	▼2	▼1.3%
22.	(Indonesia) Soekarno-Hatta International Airport	Cengkareng, Jakarta, Java	Indonesia	CGK/WIII	37,143,719	▲14	▲15.2%
23.	(China) Guangzhou Baiyun International Airport	Baiyun-Huadu District, Guangzhou, Guangdong	China	CAN/ZGGG	37,048,712	▲9	▲10.8%
24.	(United States) Charlotte Douglas International Airport	Charlotte, North Carolina	United States	CLT/KCLT	34,536,666	▲2	▼0.6%
25.	(United States) Miami International Airport	Miami-Dade County, Florida	United States	MIA/KMIA	33,886,025	▲4	▼0.5%
26.	(Italy) Leonardo da Vinci Airport	Fiumicino, Rome	Italy	FCO/LIRF	33,723,213	▼1	▼4.0%
27.	(United States) Orlando International Airport	Orlando, Florida	United States	MCO/KMCO	33,693,649	▼5	▼5.5%
28.	(Australia) Sydney Airport	Sydney, New South Wales	Australia	SYD/YSSY	33,451,383	▲5	▲0.4%
29.	(United States) Newark Liberty International Airport	Newark, New Jersey	United States	EWR/KEWR	33,399,207	▼6	▼5.5%
30.	(Germany) Munich Airport	Munich, Bavaria	Germany	MUC/EDDM	32,681,067	▼3	▼5.4%
31.	(United Kingdom) London Gatwick Airport	Crawley, West Sussex, England	United Kingdom	LGW/EGKK	32,398,979	▼3	▼5.3%
32.	(United States) Minneapolis-Saint Paul International Airport	Fort Snelling, Minnesota	United States	MSP/KMSP	32,378,599	▼2	▼4.9%
33.	(Japan) Narita International Airport	Narita, Chiba	Japan	NRT/RJAA	32,135,191	▼2	▼4.0%
34.	(China) Shanghai Pudong International Airport	Pudong, Shanghai	China	PVG/ZSPD	32,102,549	▲6	▲13.7%
35.	(United States) Detroit Metropolitan Wayne County Airport	Detroit, Michigan	United States	DTW/KDTW	31,357,388	▼11	▼10.8%
36.	(United States) Seattle-Tacoma International Airport	SeaTac, Washington	United States	SEA/KSEA	31,227,512	▼1	▼3.0%
37.	(United States) Philadelphia International Airport	Philadelphia, Pennsylvania	United States	PHL/KPHI	30,669,564	Steady	▼3.7%
38.	(Canada) Toronto Pearson International Airport	Mississauga, Ontario	Canada	YYZ/CYYZ	30,368,339	▼4	▼6.1%
39.	(Turkey) Atatürk International Airport	Yesilköy, Istanbul	Turkey	IST/LTBA	29,812,888	▲3	▲4.3%
40.	(Malaysia) Kuala Lumpur International Airport	Sepang, Selangor	Malaysia	KUL/WMKK	29,682,093	▲1	▲7.8%
41.	(South Korea) Seoul Incheon International Airport	Incheon	Republic of Korea	ICN/RKSI	28,677,161	▼2	▼4.9%
42.	(Spain) Barcelona Airport	Barcelona, Catalonia	Spain	BCN/LEBL	27,301,662	▼4	▼9.8%
43.	(United States) Logan International Airport	Boston, Massachusetts	United States	BOS/KBOS	25,512,086	▲2	▼2.3%
44.	(India) Indira Gandhi International Airport	Delhi	India	DEL/VIDP	25,252,814	▲6	▲8.6%
45.	(Australia) Melbourne Airport	Melbourne, Victoria	Australia	MEL/YMML	25,248,762	▲1	▲1.4%
46.	(France) Paris-Orly Airport	Orly	France	ORY/LFPO	25,107,693	▼2	▼4.2%
47.	(China) Shanghai Hongqiao International Airport	Changning-Minhang, Shanghai	China	SHA/ZSSS	25,078,548	▲?	▲9.6%
48.	(India) Chhatrapati Shivaji International Airport	Mumbai, Maharashtra	India	BOM/VABB	24,804,766	▼1	▲1.9%
49.	(China) Shenzhen Bao'an International Airport	Bao'an, Shenzhen, Guangdong	China	SZX/ZGSZ	24,486,406	▲?	▲14.4%
50.	Mexico City International Airport	Mexico City	Mexico	MEX/MMMX	24,243,056	▼7	▼7.5%

== 2008 statistics ==
Airports Council International's final full year figures are as follows:

Rank	Airport	Location	Country	Code (IATA/ICAO)	Total passengers	Rank change	% change
1.	(United States) Hartsfield–Jackson Atlanta International Airport	Atlanta, Georgia	United States	ATL/KATL	90,039,280	Steady	▲0.7%
2.	(United States) O'Hare International Airport	Chicago, Illinois	United States	ORD/KORD	69,353,876	Steady	▼9.0%
3.	(United Kingdom) London Heathrow Airport	Hillingdon, Greater London	United Kingdom	LHR/EGLL	67,056,379	Steady	▼1.5%
4.	(Japan) Tokyo Haneda Airport	Ōta, Tokyo	Japan	HND/RJTT	66,754,829	Steady	▼0.2%
5.	(France) Paris-Charles de Gaulle Airport	Roissy-en-France, Val d'Oise, Île-de-France	France	CDG/LFPG	60,874,681	▲1	▲1.6%
6.	(United States) Los Angeles International Airport	Los Angeles, California	United States	LAX/KLAX	59,497,539	▼1	▼4.7%
7.	(United States) Dallas/Fort Worth International Airport	Dallas–Fort Worth, Texas	United States	DFW/KDFW	57,093,187	Steady	▼4.5%
8.	(China) Beijing Capital International Airport	Chaoyang-Shunyi, Beijing	China	PEK/ZBAA	55,937,289	▲1	▲4.4%
9.	(Germany) Frankfurt Airport	Frankfurt, Hesse	Germany	FRA/EDDF	53,467,450	▼1	▼1.3%
10.	(United States) Denver International Airport	Denver, Colorado	United States	DEN/KDEN	51,245,334	▲1	▲2.8%
11.	(Spain) Madrid-Barajas Airport	Barajas, Madrid	Spain	MAD/LEMD	50,824,435	▼1	▼2.4%
12.	Hong Kong International Airport	Chek Lap Kok, Hong Kong	Hong Kong	HKG/VHHH	47,857,746	▲2	▲1.7%
13.	(United States) John F. Kennedy International Airport	Queens, New York, New York	United States	JFK/KJFK	47,807,816	Steady	▲0.2%
14.	(Netherlands) Amsterdam Airport Schiphol	Haarlemmermeer, North Holland	Netherlands	AMS/EHAM	47,430,019	▼2	▼0.8%
15.	(United States) McCarran International Airport	Las Vegas, Nevada	United States	LAS/KLAS	43,208,724	Steady	▼8.0%
16.	(United States) George Bush Intercontinental Airport	Houston, Texas	United States	IAH/KIAH	41,709,389	Steady	▼3.0%
17.	(United States) Phoenix Sky Harbor International Airport	Phoenix, Maricopa, Arizona	United States	PHX/KPHX	39,891,193	Steady	▼5.4%
18.	(Thailand) Suvarnabhumi Airport	Bang Phli, Samut Prakan	Thailand	BKK/VTBS	38,603,490	Steady	▼6.3%
19.	Singapore Changi Airport	Changi	Singapore	SIN/WSSS	37,694,824	Steady	▲2.7%
20.	(United Arab Emirates) Dubai International Airport	Garhoud, Dubai	United Arab Emirates	DXB/OMDB	37,441,440	▲7	▲9.0%
21.	(United States) San Francisco International Airport	San Mateo County, California	United States	SFO/KSFO	37,234,592	▲2	▲4.7%
22.	(United States) Orlando International Airport	Orlando, Florida	United States	MCO/KMCO	35,660,742	▼2	▼2.3%
23.	(United States) Newark Liberty International Airport	Newark, New Jersey	United States	EWR/KEWR	35,360,848	▼2	▼2.8%
24.	(United States) Detroit Metropolitan Wayne County Airport	Romulus, Michigan	United States	DTW/KDTW	35,135,828	▼2	▼2.4%
25.	(Italy) Leonardo da Vinci Airport	Fiumicino, Rome, Lazio	Italy	FCO/LIRF	35,132,224	▲6	▲6.9%
26.	(United States) Charlotte Douglas International Airport	Charlotte, North Carolina	United States	CLT/KCLT	34,739,020	▲4	▲4.7%
27.	(Germany) Munich Airport	Erding, Bavaria	Germany	MUC/EDDM	34,530,593	▲1	▲1.7%
28.	(United Kingdom) London Gatwick Airport	Crawley, West Sussex, South East, England	United Kingdom	LGW/EGKK	34,214,740	▼3	▼2.9%
29.	(United States) Miami International Airport	Miami, Florida	United States	MIA/KMIA	34,063,531	Steady	▲1.0%
30.	(United States) Minneapolis-Saint Paul International Airport	Fort Snelling, Minnesota	United States	MSP/KMSP	34,056,443	Steady	▼3.0%
31.	(Japan) Narita International Airport	Narita, Chiba	Japan	NRT/RJAA	33,486,511	▼6	▼5.6%
32.	(China) Guangzhou Baiyun International Airport	Baiyun-Huadu, Guangzhou, Guangdong	China	CAN/ZGGG	33,444,814	▲7	▲8.0%
33.	(Australia) Sydney Airport	Sydney, New South Wales	Australia	SYD/YSSY	33,302,642	▲1	▲3.0%
34.	(Canada) Toronto Pearson International Airport	Mississauga, Ontario	Canada	YYZ/CYYZ	32,338,902	▲2	▲2.8%
35.	(United States) Seattle-Tacoma International Airport	SeaTac, Washington	United States	SEA/KSEA	32,187,939	▲3	▲2.8%
36.	(Indonesia) Soekarno-Hatta International Airport	Cengkareng, Jakarta, Java	Indonesia	CGK/WIII	32,172,114	▼3	▲0.6%
37.	(United States) Philadelphia International Airport	Philadelphia, Pennsylvania	United States	PHL/KPHI	31,832,419	▼2	▼1.2%
38.	(Spain) Barcelona Airport	Barcelona, Catalonia	Spain	BCN/LEBL	30,195,794	▼6	▼8.1%
39.	(South Korea) Seoul Incheon International Airport	Incheon	Republic of Korea	ICN/RKSI	30,166,816	▼2	▼4.0%
40.	(China) Shanghai Pudong International Airport	Pudong, Shanghai	China	PVG/ZSPD	28,230,017	Steady	▼2.4%
41.	(Malaysia) Kuala Lumpur International Airport	Sepang, Selangor	Malaysia	KUL/WMKK	27,529,355	▲1	▲2.4%
42.	(Turkey) Atatürk International Airport	Yesilköy, Istanbul	Turkey	IST/LTBA	28,553,132	▲3	▲3.1%
43.	Mexico City International Airport	Mexico City	Mexico	MEX/MMMX	26,210,217	▲1	▲1.3%
44.	(France) Paris-Orly Airport	Orly	France	ORY/LFPO	26,207,628	▼1	▼0.9%
45.	(United States) Logan International Airport	Boston, Massachusetts	United States	BOS/KBOS	26,102,391	▼4	▼7.1%
46.	(Australia) Melbourne Airport	Melbourne, Victoria	Australia	MEL/YMML	24,892,467	?	▲7.9%
47.	(India) Chhatrapati Shivaji International Airport	Mumbai, Maharashtra	India	BOM/VABB	24,335,306	▼1	▼3.6%
48.	(United States) Washington Dulles International Airport	Dulles, Virginia	United States	IAD/KIAD	23,698,010	Steady	▼3.4%
49.	(Republic of Ireland) Dublin Airport	Fingal, County Dublin	Ireland	DUB/EIDW	23,466,630	?	▲0.8%
50.	(India) Indira Gandhi International Airport	Delhi	India	DEL/VIDP	23,181,090	?	▼0.7%

== 2007 statistics ==
Airports Council International's final full year figures are as follows:

Rank	Airport	Location	Country	Code (IATA/ICAO)	Total passengers	Rank change	% change
1.	(United States) Hartsfield–Jackson Atlanta International Airport	Atlanta, Georgia	United States	ATL/KATL	89,379,287	Steady	▲5.3%
2.	(United States) O'Hare International Airport	Chicago, Illinois	United States	ORD/KORD	76,177,855	Steady	▼0.1%
3.	(United Kingdom) London Heathrow Airport	Hillingdon, Greater London	United Kingdom	LHR/EGLL	68,068,304	Steady	▲0.8%
4.	(Japan) Tokyo Haneda Airport	Ōta, Tokyo	Japan	HND/RJTT	66,823,414	Steady	▲1.1%
5.	(United States) Los Angeles International Airport	Los Angeles, California	United States	LAX/KLAX	61,896,075	Steady	▲1.4%
6.	(France) Paris-Charles de Gaulle Airport	Roissy-en-France, Île-de-France	France	CDG/LFPG	59,922,177	▲1	▲5.4%
7.	(United States) Dallas/Fort Worth International Airport	Dallas/Fort Worth, Texas	United States	DFW/KDFW	59,786,476	▼1	▼0.7%
8.	(Germany) Frankfurt Airport	Frankfurt, Hesse	Germany	FRA/EDDF	54,161,856	Steady	▲2.6%
9.	(China) Beijing Capital International Airport	Chaoyang-Shunyi, Beijing	China	PEK/ZBAA	53,583,664	Steady	▲10.1%
10.	(Spain) Madrid-Barajas Airport	Barajas, Madrid	Spain	MAD/LEMD	52,122,702	▲3	▲13.9%
11.	(United States) Denver International Airport	Denver, Colorado	United States	DEN/KDEN	49,863,352	▼1	▲5.4%
12.	(Netherlands) Amsterdam Airport Schiphol	Haarlemmermeer, North Holland	Netherlands	AMS/EHAM	47,794,994	Steady	▲3.8%
13.	(United States) John F. Kennedy International Airport	Queens, New York, New York	United States	JFK/KJFK	47,716,941	▲2	▲11.9%
14.	Hong Kong International Airport	Chek Lap Kok, Hong Kong	Hong Kong	HKG/VHHH	47,042,419	Steady	▲7.3%
15.	(United States) McCarran International Airport	Las Vegas, Nevada	United States	LAS/KLAS	46,961,011	▼4	▲3.2%
16.	(United States) George Bush Intercontinental Airport	Houston, Texas	United States	IAH/KIAH	42,998,040	▲1	▲1.1%
17.	(United States) Phoenix Sky Harbor International Airport	Phoenix, Maricopa, Arizona	United States	PHX/KPHX	42,184,515	▲1	▲1.8%
18.	(Thailand) Suvarnabhumi Airport	Bang Phli, Samut Prakan	Thailand	BKK/VTBS	41,210,081	▼2	▼3.7%
19.	Singapore Changi Airport	Changi	Singapore	SIN/WSSS	36,701,556	▲3	▲4.8%
20.	(United States) Orlando International Airport	Orlando, Florida	United States	MCO/KMCO	36,480,416	▲4	▲5.3%
21.	(United States) Newark Liberty International Airport	Newark, New Jersey	United States	EWR/KEWR	36,367,240	▼2	▲2.1%
22.	(United States) Detroit Metropolitan Wayne County Airport	Detroit, Michigan	United States	DTW/KDTW	35,983,478	▼2	▲0%
23.	(United States) San Francisco International Airport	San Mateo County, California	United States	SFO/KSFO	35,792,707	▲3	▲6.6%
24.	(Japan) Narita International Airport	Narita, Chiba	Japan	NRT/RJAA	35,478,146	▼1	▲1.4%
25.	(United Kingdom) London Gatwick Airport	Crawley, West Sussex, England	United Kingdom	LGW/EGKK	35,218,374	Steady	▲3.1%
26.	(United States) Minneapolis-Saint Paul International Airport	Fort Snelling, Minnesota	United States	MSP/KMSP	35,157,322	▼5	▼1.3%
27.	(United Arab Emirates) Dubai International Airport	Garhoud, Dubai	United Arab Emirates	DXB/OMDB	34,348,110	▲10	▲19.3%
28.	(Germany) Munich Airport	Erding, Bavaria	Germany	MUC/EDDM	33,959,422	▲2	▲10.4%
29.	(United States) Miami International Airport	Miami, Florida	United States	MIA/KMIA	33,740,416	▼2	▲3.7%
30.	(United States) Charlotte/Douglas International Airport	Charlotte, North Carolina	United States	CLT/KCLT	33,165,688	Steady	▲11.7%
31.	(Italy) Leonardo da Vinci Airport	Fiumicino, Rome, Lazio	Italy	FCO/LIRF	32,855,542	▲2	▲9.2%
32.	(Spain) Barcelona–El Prat Airport	El Prat de Llobregat, Catalonia	Spain	BCN/LEBL	32,794,575	▲2	▲9.3%
33.	(Indonesia) Soekarno-Hatta International Airport	Cengkareng, Jakarta, Java	Indonesia	CGK/WIII	32,458,946	▼2	▲6.1%
34.	(Australia) Sydney Airport	Mascot, Sydney, New South Wales	Australia	SYD/YSSY	32,323,380	▼2	▲6.4%
35.	(United States) Philadelphia International Airport	Philadelphia, Pennsylvania	United States	PHL/KPHL	32,211,439	▼7	▲1.4%
36.	(Canada) Toronto Pearson International Airport	Mississauga, Ontario	Canada	YYZ/CYYZ	31,452,848	▼7	▲2.1%
37.	(South Korea) Seoul Incheon International Airport	Incheon	Republic of Korea	ICN/RKSI	31,421,801	▲1	▲10.8%
38.	(United States) Seattle-Tacoma International Airport	SeaTac, Washington	United States	SEA/KSEA	31,296,628	▼3	▲4.3%
39.	(China) Guangzhou Baiyun International Airport	Baiyun-Huadu, Guangzhou, Guangdong	China	CAN/ZGGG	30,958,374	▲3	▲18.9%
40.	(China) Shanghai Pudong International Airport	Pudong, Shanghai	China	PVG/ZSPD	29,083,510	Steady	▲8.6%
41.	(United States) Logan International Airport	Boston, Massachusetts	United States	BOS/KBOS	28,102,455	▼2	▲1.4%
42.	(Malaysia) Kuala Lumpur International Airport	Sepang, Selangor	Malaysia	KUL/WMKK	26,453,379	▲3	▲9.6%
43.	(France) Paris-Orly Airport	Orly, Île-de-France	France	ORY/LFPO	26,440,736	Steady	▲3.2%
44.	Mexico City International Airport	Venustiano Carranza, Mexico City	Mexico	MEX/MMMX	25,881,662	Steady	▲4.7%
45.	(Turkey) Atatürk International Airport	Yesilköy, Istanbul	Turkey	IST/LTBA	23,196,229	▲2	▲9.9%
46.	(India) Chhatrapati Shivaji International Airport	Mumbai, Maharashtra	India	BOM/VABB	25,236,400	?	▲18.1%
47.	(United States) LaGuardia Airport	Queens, New York, New York	United States	LGA/KLGA	25,026,267	▼6	▼3.0%
48.	(United States) Washington Dulles International Airport	Dulles, Virginia	United States	IAD/KIAD	24,525,487	Steady	▲7.5%
49.	(Italy) Milan–Malpensa Airport	Varese, Lombardy	Italy	MXP/LIMC	23,885,391	?	▲9.7%
50.	(United Kingdom) London Stansted Airport	Uttlesford, Essex, England	United Kingdom	STN/EGSS	23,686,800	▼4	▲0.4%

== 2006 statistics ==
Airports Council International's final full year figures are as follows:

Rank	Airport	Location	Country	Code (IATA/ICAO)	Total passengers	Rank change	% change
1.	(United States) Hartsfield–Jackson Atlanta International Airport	Atlanta, Georgia	United States	ATL/KATL	84,846,639	Steady	▼1.2%
2.	(United States) O'Hare International Airport	Chicago, Illinois	United States	ORD/KORD	77,028,134	Steady	▲0.7%
3.	(United Kingdom) London Heathrow Airport	Hillingdon, Greater London	United Kingdom	LHR/EGLL	67,530,197	Steady	▼0.6%
4.	(Japan) Tokyo Haneda Airport	Ōta, Tokyo, Kantō, Honshū	Japan	HND/RJTT	65,810,672	Steady	▲4.0%
5.	(United States) Los Angeles International Airport	Los Angeles, California	United States	LAX/KLAX	61,041,066	Steady	▼0.7%
6.	(United States) Dallas/Fort Worth International Airport	Dallas/Fort Worth, Texas	United States	DFW/KDFW	60,226,138	Steady	▲1.8%
7.	(France) Paris-Charles de Gaulle Airport	Roissy-en-France, Île-de-France	France	CDG/LFPG	56,849,567	Steady	▲5.7%
8.	(Germany) Frankfurt Airport	Frankfurt, Hesse	Germany	FRA/EDDF	52,810,683	Steady	▲1.1%
9.	(China) Beijing Capital International Airport	Chaoyang-Shunyi, Beijing	China	PEK/ZBAA	48,654,770	▲6	▲18.7%
10.	(United States) Denver International Airport	Denver, Colorado	United States	DEN/KDEN	47,325,016	▲1	▲9.1%
11.	(United States) McCarran International Airport	Las Vegas, Nevada, Nevada	United States	LAS/KLAS	46,193,329	▼1	▲5.0%
12.	(Netherlands) Amsterdam Airport Schiphol	Haarlemmermeer, North Holland	Netherlands	AMS/EHAM	46,065,719	▼3	▲4.4%
13.	(Spain) Madrid-Barajas Airport	Barajas, Madrid	Spain	MAD/LEMD	45,501,168	▼1	▲8.0%
14.	Hong Kong International Airport	Chek Lap Kok, Hong Kong	Hong Kong	HKG/VHHH	43,857,908	▲2	▲8.9%
15.	(United States) John F. Kennedy International Airport	Queens, New York, New York	United States	JFK/KJFK	43,762,282	▼2	▲4.5%
16.	(Thailand) Suvarnabhumi Airport^{1}	Bang Phli, Samut Prakan	Thailand	BKK/VTBS	42,799,532	▲2	▲9.8%
17.	(United States) George Bush Intercontinental Airport	Houston, Texas	United States	IAH/KIAH	42,550,432	Steady	▲7.1%
18.	(United States) Phoenix Sky Harbor International Airport	Phoenix, Maricopa, Arizona	United States	PHX/KPHX	41,436,737	▼4	▲0.5%
19.	(United States) Newark Liberty International Airport	Newark, New Jersey	United States	EWR/KEWR	36,724,167	▲3	▲7.9%
20.	(United States) Detroit Metropolitan Wayne County Airport	Detroit, Michigan	United States	DTW/KDTW	35,972,673	Steady	▼1.1%
21.	(United States) Minneapolis-Saint Paul International Airport	Fort Snelling, Minnesota	United States	MSP/KMSP	35,612,133	▼2	▼5.3%
22.	Singapore Changi Airport	Changi	Singapore	SIN/WSSS	35,033,083	▲3	▲8.0%
23.	(Japan) Narita International Airport	Narita, Chiba, Kantō, Honshū	Japan	NRT/RJAA	34,975,225	▲4	▲11.3%
24.	(United States) Orlando International Airport	Orlando, Florida	United States	MCO/KMCO	34,640,451	▼3	▲1.5%
25.	(United Kingdom) London Gatwick Airport	Crawley, West Sussex, England	United Kingdom	LGW/EGKK	34,172,492	▼1	▲4.2%
26.	(United States) San Francisco International Airport	San Mateo County, California	United States	SFO/KSFO	33,574,807	▼3	▲0.5%
27.	(United States) Miami International Airport	Miami, Florida	United States	MIA/KMIA	32,533,974	▲1	▲4.9%
28.	(United States) Philadelphia International Airport	Philadelphia, Pennsylvania	United States	PHL/KPHL	31,768,272	▼2	▲0.9%
29.	(Canada) Toronto Pearson International Airport	Mississauga, Ontario	Canada	YYZ/CYYZ	30,792,577	Steady	▲2.9%
30.	(Germany) Munich Airport	Munich, Bavaria	Germany	MUC/EDDM	30,757,978	▲3	▲7.5%
31.	(Indonesia) Soekarno-Hatta International Airport	Cengkareng, Jakarta, Java	Indonesia	CGK/WIII	30,583,957	▲4	▲9.4%
32.	(Australia) Sydney Airport	Mascot, Sydney, New South Wales	Australia	SYD/YSSY	30,375,799	▼1	▲3.9%
33.	(Italy) Leonardo da Vinci Airport	Fiumicino, Rome, Lazio	Italy	FCO/LIRF	30,102,097	▼1	▲5.2%
34.	(Spain) Barcelona–El Prat Airport	El Prat de Llobregat, Catalonia	Spain	BCN/LEBL	30,000,601	▲2	▲10.5%
35.	(United States) Seattle-Tacoma International Airport	SeaTac, Washington	United States	SEA/KSEA	29,979,097	▼5	▲2.4%
36.	(United States) Charlotte Douglas International Airport	Charlotte, North Carolina	United States	CLT/KCLT	29,693,949	▼2	▲5.3%
37.	(United Arab Emirates) Dubai International Airport	Garhoud, Dubai	United Arab Emirates	DXB/OMDB	28,788,726	▲5	▲16.2%
38.	(South Korea) Seoul Incheon International Airport	Incheon	Republic of Korea	ICN/RKSI	28,360,723	▲2	▲8.2%
39.	(United States) Logan International Airport	Boston, Massachusetts	United States	BOS/KBOS	27,725,443	▼2	▲2.4%
40.	(China) Shanghai Pudong International Airport	Pudong, Shanghai	China	PVG/ZSPD	26,789,125	▲4	▲12.9%
41.	(United States) LaGuardia Airport	Queens, New York, New York	United States	LGA/KLGA	26,571,146	▼2	▼0.4%
42.	(China) Guangzhou Baiyun International Airport	Baiyun-Huadu, Guangzhou, Guangdong	China	CAN/ZGGG	26,222,037	▲3	▲11.3%
43.	(France) Paris-Orly Airport	Orly, Île-de-France	France	ORY/LFPO	25,622,152	▼2	▲3.1%
44.	Mexico City International Airport	Venustiano Carranza, Mexico City	Mexico	MEX/MMMX	24,727,296	▼1	▲2.5%
45.	(Malaysia) Kuala Lumpur International Airport	Sepang, Selangor	Malaysia	KUL/WMKK	24,129,748	▲1	▲3.9%
46.	(United Kingdom) London Stansted Airport	Uttlesford, Essex, England	United Kingdom	STN/EGSS	23,686,800	?	▲7.6%
47.	(Turkey) Atatürk International Airport	Yesilköy, Istanbul	Turkey	IST/LTBA	21,265,974	?	▲10.1%
48.	Taiwan Taoyuan International Airport	Dayuan, Taoyuan	Taiwan	TPE/RCTP	22,857,445	?	▲5.3%
49.	(United States) Washington Dulles International Airport	Dulles, Virginia	United States	IAD/KIAD	22,813,067	▼10	▼15.0%
50.	(United Kingdom) Manchester Airport	Ringway, Manchester, England	United Kingdom	MAN/EGCC	22,776,337	▼2	▲0.2%

Notes

- ^1 Includes figures for Bangkok International Airport from 1 January 2006 to 27 September 2006.

== 2005 statistics ==
Airports Council International's final full year figures are as follows:

Rank	Airport	Location	Country	Code (IATA/ICAO)	Total passengers	Rank change	% change
1.	(United States) Hartsfield–Jackson Atlanta International Airport	Atlanta, Georgia	United States	ATL/KATL	85,907,423	Steady	▲2.8%
2.	(United States) O'Hare International Airport	Chicago, Illinois	United States	ORD/KORD	76,510,003	Steady	▲1.3%
3.	(United Kingdom) London Heathrow Airport	Hillingdon, Greater London	United Kingdom	LHR/EGLL	67,915,403	Steady	▲0.8%
4.	(Japan) Tokyo Haneda Airport	Ōta, Tokyo, Kantō, Honshū	Japan	HND/RJTT	63,282,219	Steady	▲1.6%
5.	(United States) Los Angeles International Airport	Los Angeles, California	United States	LAX/KLAX	61,489,398	Steady	▲1.3%
6.	(United States) Dallas/Fort Worth International Airport	Dallas/Fort Worth, Texas	United States	DFW/KDFW	59,176,265	Steady	▼0.4%
7.	(France) Paris-Charles de Gaulle Airport	Roissy-en-France, Île-de-France	France	CDG/LFPG	53,798,308	Steady	▲5.0%
8.	(Germany) Frankfurt Airport	Frankfurt, Hesse	Germany	FRA/EDDF	52,219,412	Steady	▲2.2%
9.	(Netherlands) Amsterdam Airport Schiphol	Haarlemmermeer, North Holland	Netherlands	AMS/EHAM	44,163,098	Steady	▲3.8%
10.	(United States) McCarran International Airport	Las Vegas, Nevada, Nevada	United States	LAS/KLAS	43,989,982	▲1	▲6.0%
11.	(United States) Denver International Airport	Denver, Colorado	United States	DEN/KDEN	43,387,513	▼1	▲2.6%
12.	(Spain) Madrid-Barajas Airport	Barajas, Madrid	Spain	MAD/LEMD	41,940,059	▲1	▲8.4%
13.	(United States) John F. Kennedy International Airport	Queens, New York, New York	United States	JFK/KJFK	41,885,104	▲2	▲8.9%
14.	(United States) Phoenix Sky Harbor International Airport	Phoenix, Maricopa, Arizona	United States	PHX/KPHX	41,213,754	▼2	▲4.3%
15.	(China) Beijing Capital International Airport	Chaoyang-Shunyi, Beijing	China	PEK/ZBAA	41,004,008	▲5	▲17.5%
16.	Hong Kong International Airport	Chek Lap Kok, Hong Kong	Hong Kong	HKG/VHHH	40,269,847	▲1	▲9.7%
17.	(United States) George Bush Intercontinental Airport	Houston, Texas	United States	IAH/KIAH	39,684,640	▲1	▲8.7%
18.	(Thailand) Bangkok International Airport	Don Mueang, Bangkok	Thailand	DMK/VTBD	38,985,043	▼4	▲2.7%
19.	(United States) Minneapolis-Saint Paul International Airport	Fort Snelling, Minnesota	United States	MSP/KMSP	37,604,373	▼3	▲2.4%
20.	(United States) Detroit Metropolitan Wayne County Airport	Detroit, Michigan	United States	DTW/KDTW	36,389,294	▼1	▲3.2%
21.	(United States) Orlando International Airport	Orlando, Florida	United States	MCO/KMCO	34,128,048	▲3	▲8.4%
22	(United States) Newark Liberty International Airport	Newark, New Jersey	United States	EWR/KEWR	33,999,990	Steady	▲3.3%
23.	(United States) San Francisco International Airport	San Francisco, California	United States	SFO/KSFO	32,803,363	▼2	▲2.0%
24.	(United Kingdom) London Gatwick Airport	Crawley, West Sussex, England	United Kingdom	LGW/EGKK	32,784,330	▼1	▲4.2%
25.	Singapore Changi Airport	Changi	Singapore	SIN/WSSS	32,430,856	▲1	▲6.8%
26.	(United States) Philadelphia International Airport	Philadelphia, Pennsylvania	United States	PHL/KPHL	31,495,385	▲4	▲10.5%
27.	(Japan) Narita International Airport	Narita, Chiba, Kantō, Honshū	Japan	NRT/RJAA	31,451,274	▼2	▲1.3%
28.	(United States) Miami International Airport	Miami, Florida	United States	MIA/KMIA	31,008,453	▼1	▲2.8%
29.	(Canada) Toronto Pearson International Airport	Mississauga, Ontario	Canada	YYZ/CYYZ	29,914,750	Steady	▲4.5%
30.	(United States) Seattle-Tacoma International Airport	SeaTac, Washington	United States	SEA/KSEA	29,289,026	▼2	▲1.7%
31.	(Australia) Sydney Airport	Mascot, Sydney, New South Wales	Australia	SYD/YSSY	29,234,504	?	▲4.0%
32.	(Italy) Leonardo da Vinci Airport	Fiumicino, Rome, Lazio	Italy	FCO/LIRF	28,619,845	?	▲2.0%
33.	(Germany) Munich Airport	Erding, Bavaria	Germany	MUC/EDDM	28,619,427	?	▲6.7%
34.	(United States) Charlotte Douglas International Airport	Charlotte, North Carolina	United States	CLT/KCLT	28,206,052	?	▲12.1%
35.	(Indonesia) Soekarno-Hatta International Airport	Cengkareng, Jakarta, Java	Indonesia	CGK/WIII	27,947,482	?	▲8.8%
36.	(Spain) Barcelona–El Prat Airport	El Prat de Llobregat, Catalonia	Spain	BCN/LEBL	27,121,753	?	▲10.1%
37.	(United States) Logan International Airport	Boston, Massachusetts	United States	BOS/KBOS	27,087,905	?	▲3.6%
38.	(United States) Washington Dulles International Airport	Dulles, Virginia	United States	IAD/KIAD	26,842,922	?	▲18.5%
39.	(United States) LaGuardia Airport	Queens, New York, New York	United States	LGA/KLGA	26,671,787	?	▲5.2%
40.	(South Korea) Seoul Incheon International Airport	Incheon	Republic of Korea	ICN/RKSI	26,223,291	?	▲8.2%
41.	(France) Paris-Orly Airport	Orly, Île-de-France	France	ORY/LFPO	24,860,532	?	▲3.4%
42.	(United Arab Emirates) Dubai International Airport	Garhoud, Dubai	United Arab Emirates	DXB/OMDB	24,782,288	?	▲14.1%
43.	Mexico City International Airport	Venustiano Carranza, Mexico City	Mexico	MEX/MMMX	24,115,552	?	▲4.9%
44.	(China) Shanghai Pudong International Airport	Pudong, Shanghai	China	PVG/ZSPD	23,720,185	?	▲12.3%
45.	(China) Guangzhou Baiyun International Airport	Baiyun-Huadu, Guangzhou, Guangdong	China	CAN/ZGGG	23,558,274	?	▲15.7%
46.	(Malaysia) Kuala Lumpur International Airport	Sepang, Selangor	Malaysia	KUL/WMKK	23,213,926	?	▲10.2%
47.	(United States) Cincinnati/Northern Kentucky International Airport	Hebron, Kentucky	United States	CVG/KCVG	22,778,785	?	▲3.2%
48.	(United Kingdom) Manchester Airport	Ringway, Manchester, England	United Kingdom	MAN/EGCC	22,734,350	?	▲5.5%
49.	(United States) Fort Lauderdale–Hollywood International Airport	Broward County, Florida	United States	FLL/KFLL	22,390,285	?	▲7.5%
50.	(United States) Salt Lake City International Airport	Salt Lake City, Utah	United States	SLC/KSLC	22,237,176	?	▲21.1%

== 2004 statistics ==
Airports Council International's final full year figures are as follows:

Rank	Airport	Location	Code (IATA/ICAO)	Total passengers	Rank change	% change
1.	(United States) Hartsfield-Jackson Atlanta International Airport	Atlanta, Georgia, United States	ATL/KATL	83,606,583	Steady	▲5.7%
2.	(United States) O'Hare International Airport	Chicago, Illinois, United States	ORD/KORD	75,533,822	Steady	▲8.7%
3.	(United Kingdom) London Heathrow Airport	Hillingdon, Greater London, United Kingdom	LHR/EGLL	67,344,054	Steady	▲6.1%
4.	(Japan) Tokyo Haneda Airport	Ōta, Tokyo, Kantō, Honshū, Japan	HND/RJTT	62,291,405	Steady	▼0.9%
5.	(United States) Los Angeles International Airport	Los Angeles, California, United States	LAX/KLAX	60,688,609	Steady	▲10.4%
6.	(United States) Dallas/Fort Worth International Airport	Dallas/Fort Worth, Texas, United States,	DFW/KDFW	59,412,217	Steady	▲11.6%
7.	(France) Paris-Charles de Gaulle Airport	Roissy-en-France, Paris, Île-de-France, France	CDG/LFPG	51,260,363	▲1	▲6.3%
8.	(Germany) Frankfurt Airport	Frankfurt, Hesse, Germany	FRA/EDDF	51,098,271	▼1	▲5.7%
9.	(Netherlands) Amsterdam Airport Schiphol	Haarlemmermeer, North Holland, Netherlands	AMS/EHAM	42,541,180	Steady	▲6.5%
10.	(United States) Denver International Airport	Denver, Colorado, United States	DEN/KDEN	42,393,766	Steady	▲13.0%
11.	(United States) McCarran International Airport	Las Vegas, Nevada, Nevada, United States	LAS/KLAS	41,441,531	▲1	▲14.2%
12.	(United States) Phoenix Sky Harbor International Airport	Phoenix, Maricopa, Arizona, United States	PHX/KPHX	39,504,898	▼1	▲5.6%
13.	(Spain) Madrid-Barajas Airport	Barajas, Madrid, Spain	MAD/LEMD	38,704,731	Steady	▲7.9%
14.	(Thailand) Bangkok International Airport	Don Mueang, Bangkok, Thailand	DMK/VTBD	37,960,169	▲4	▲25.8%
15.	(United States) John F. Kennedy International Airport	Queens, New York, New York, United States	JFK/KJFK	37,518,143	▲2	▲18.2%
16.	(United States) Minneapolis-Saint Paul International Airport	Minneapolis-St. Paul, Minnesota, United States	MSP/KMSP	36,713,173	▼1	▲10.6%
17.	Hong Kong International Airport	Chek Lap Kok, Hong Kong	HKG/VHHH	36,711,920	▲7	▲35.5%
18.	(United States) George Bush Intercontinental Airport	Houston, Texas, United States	IAH/KIAH	36,506,116	▼4	▲6.9%
19.	(United States) Detroit Metropolitan Wayne County Airport	Detroit, Michigan, United States	DTW/KDTW	35,187,517	▼3	▲7.7%
20.	(China) Beijing Capital International Airport	Chaoyang-Shunyi, Beijing, China	PEK/ZBAA	34,883,190	▲12	▲43.2%
21.	(United States) San Francisco International Airport	San Mateo County (unincorporated), California, United States	SFO/KSFO	32,247,746	▲1	▲10.0%
22.	(United States) Newark Liberty International Airport	Newark, New Jersey, United States	EWR/KEWR	31,947,266	▼1	▲8.4%
23.	(United Kingdom) London Gatwick Airport	Crawley, West Sussex, England, United Kingdom	LGW/EGKK	31,461,454	▼4	▲4.8%
24.	(United States) Orlando International Airport	Orlando, Florida, United States	MCO/KMCO	31,143,388	▼1	▲14.0%
25.	(Japan) Narita International Airport	Narita, Chiba, Kantō, Honshū, Japan	NRT/RJAA	31,057,252	▲1	▲17.0%
26.	Singapore Changi Airport	Changi, Singapore	SIN/WSSS	30,353,565	▲5	▲23.1%
27.	(United States) Miami International Airport	Miami, Florida, United States	MIA/KMIA	30,165,197	▼7	▲1.9%
28.	(United States) Seattle-Tacoma International Airport	SeaTac, Washington, United States	SEA/KSEA	28,804,554	▼3	▲7.5%
29.	(Canada) Toronto Pearson International Airport	Mississauga, Ontario, Canada	YYZ/CYYZ	28,615,709	▼1	▲15.7%
30.	(United States) Philadelphia International Airport	Philadelphia, Pennsylvania, United States	PHL/KPHI	28,507,420	Steady	▲15.5%
31.	(Italy) Leonardo da Vinci Airport	Fiumicino, Rome, Lazio, Italy	FCO/LIRF	28,118,899	▼4	▲7.0%
32.	(Australia) Sydney Airport	Sydney, New South Wales, Australia	SYD/YSSY	26,983,107	▼3	▲10.3%
33.	(Germany) Munich Airport	Erding, Bavaria, Germany	MUC/EDDM	26,814,505	Steady	▲10.8%
34.	(United States) Logan International Airport	Boston, Massachusetts, United States	BOS/KBOS	26,142,516	▲1	▲14.7%
35.	(Indonesia) Soekarno-Hatta International Airport	Cengkareng, Jakarta, Java, Indonesia	CGK/WIII	26,083,267	▲10	▲32.4%
36.	(United States) Charlotte Douglas International Airport	Charlotte, North Carolina, United States	CLT/KCLT	25,534,374	▼2	▲10.7%
37.	(Spain) Barcelona–El Prat Airport	El Prat de Llobregat, Catalonia, Spain	BCN/LEBL	24,550,949	▼1	▲7.9%
38.	(United States) LaGuardia Airport	Queens, New York, New York, United States	LGA/KLGA	24,435,661	▼1	▲8.7%
39.	(South Korea) Seoul Incheon International Airport	Jung District, Incheon, Republic of Korea	ICN/RKSI	24,235,089	▲4	▲21.6%
40.	(France) Paris-Orly Airport	Orly, Île-de-France, France	ORY/LFPO	24,053,215	▼2	▲7.1%
41.	Mexico City International Airport	Venustiano Carranza, Mexico City, Mexico	MEX/MMMX	22,994,043	▼2	▲6.0%
42.	(United States) Washington Dulles International Airport	Dulles, Virginia, United States	IAD/KIAD	22,660,229	▲?	▲35.1%
43.	(United States) Cincinnati/Northern Kentucky International Airport	Hebron, Kentucky, United States	CVG/KCVG	22,062,557	▼3	▲2.0%
44.	(United States) Daniel K. Inouye International Airport	Honolulu, Hawaii, United States	HNL/PHNL	21,971,556	▲2	▲11.3%
45.	(United Arab Emirates) Dubai International Airport	Garhoud, Dubai, United Arab Emirates	DXB/OMDB	21,711,522	▲?	▲20.2%
46.	(United Kingdom) Manchester Airport	Ringway, Manchester, England, United Kingdom	MAN/EGCC	21,544,199	▼2	▲8.3%
47.	(China) Shanghai Pudong International Airport	Pudong, Shanghai, China	PVG/ZSPD	21,124,233	▲?	▲39.5%
48.	(Malaysia) Kuala Lumpur International Airport	Sepang, Selangor, Malaysia	KUL/WMKK	21,058,572	▲?	▲20.6%
49.	(United Kingdom) London Stansted Airport	Uttlesford, Essex, England, United Kingdom	STN/EGSS	20,908,006	▲1	▲11.7%
50.	(United States) Fort Lauderdale–Hollywood International Airport	Broward County, Florida, United States	FLL/KFLL	20,819,292	▲?	▲16.1%

== 2003 statistics ==
Airports Council International's final full year figures are as follows:

Rank	Airport	Location	Code (IATA/ICAO)	Total passengers	Rank change	% change
1.	(United States) Hartsfield-Jackson Atlanta International Airport	Atlanta, Georgia, United States	ATL/KATL	79,086,792	Steady	▲2.9%
2.	(United States) O'Hare International Airport	Chicago, Illinois, United States	ORD/KORD	69,354,154	Steady	▲4.2%
3.	(United Kingdom) London Heathrow Airport	Hillingdon, Greater London, United Kingdom	LHR/EGLL	63,468,620	Steady	▲0.2%
4.	(Japan) Tokyo Haneda Airport	Ōta, Tokyo, Kantō, Honshū, Japan	HND/RJTT	63,172,925	Steady	▲3.4%
5.	(United States) Los Angeles International Airport	Los Angeles, California United States,	LAX/KLAX	54,969,053	Steady	▼2.2%
6.	(United States) Dallas/Fort Worth International Airport	Dallas/Fort Worth, Texas, United States,	DFW/KDFW	53,243,061	Steady	▲0.8%
7.	(Germany) Frankfurt Airport	Frankfurt, Hesse, Germany	FRA/EDDF	48,351,664	Steady	▼0.2%
8.	(France) Paris-Charles de Gaulle Airport	Roissy-en-France, Paris, Île-de-France, France	CDG/LFPG	48,122,038	Steady	▼0.4%
9.	(Netherlands) Amsterdam Airport Schiphol	Haarlemmermeer, North Holland, Netherlands	AMS/EHAM	39,959,161	Steady	▼1.9%
10.	(United States) Denver International Airport	Denver, Colorado, United States	DEN/KDEN	37,462,428	Steady	▲5.1%
11.	(United States) Phoenix Sky Harbor International Airport	Phoenix, Maricopa, Arizona, United States	PHX/KPHX	37,409,388	Steady	▲5.2%
12.	(United States) McCarran International Airport	Las Vegas, Nevada, Nevada, United States	LAS/KLAS	36,265,705	Steady	▲3.6%
13.	(Spain) Madrid-Barajas Airport	Barajas, Madrid, Spain	MAD/LEMD	35,694,331	Steady	▲5.2%
14.	(United States) George Bush Intercontinental Airport	Houston, Texas, United States	IAH/KIAH	34,119,680	Steady	▲0.6%
15.	(United States) Minneapolis-Saint Paul International Airport	Minneapolis-Saint Paul, Minnesota, United States	MSP/KMSP	33,195,873	▲1	▲2.0%
16.	(United States) Detroit Metropolitan Wayne County Airport	Detroit, Michigan, United States	DTW/KDTW	32,679,350	▲1	▲0.2%
17.	(United States) John F. Kennedy International Airport	Queens, New York, New York, United States	JFK/KJFK	31,712,728	▲4	▲5.0%
18.	(Thailand) Bangkok International Airport	Don Mueang, Bangkok, Thailand	DMK/VTBD	30,175,379	Steady	▼6.2%
19.	(United Kingdom) London Gatwick Airport	Crawley, West Sussex, England, United Kingdom	LGW/EGKK	30,007,209	▲3	▲1.3%
20.	(United States) Miami International Airport	Miami, Florida, United States	MIA/KMIA	29,595,618	Steady	▼1.5%
21.	(United States) Newark Liberty International Airport	Newark, New Jersey, United States	EWR/KEWR	29,584,600	▲2	▲1.2%
22.	(United States) San Francisco International Airport	San Francisco, California, United States	SFO/KSFO	29,296,681	▼3	▼6.8%
23.	(United States) Orlando International Airport	Orlando, Florida, United States	MCO/KMCO	27,316,221	▲5	▲2.5%
24.	Hong Kong International Airport	Chek Lap Kok, Hong Kong	HKG/VHHH	27,092,290	▼9	▼20.0%
25.	(United States) Seattle-Tacoma International Airport	SeaTac, Washington, United States	SEA/KSEA	26,752,768	▲2	▲0.2%
26.	(Japan) Narita International Airport	Narita, Chiba, Kantō, Honshū, Japan	NRT/RJAA	26,492,384	▼1	▼8.3%
27.	(Italy) Leonardo da Vinci Airport	Fiumicino, Rome, Lazio, Italy	FCO/LIRF	26,285,036	▲4	▲3.7%
28.	(Canada) Toronto Pearson International Airport	Mississauga, Ontario, Canada	YYZ/CYYZ	24,739,784	▲1	▼4.6%
29.	(Australia) Sydney Airport	Sydney, New South Wales, Australia	SYD/YSSY	24,704,132	▲4	▲4.8%
30.	(United States) Philadelphia International Airport	Philadelphia, Pennsylvania, United States	PHL/KPHL	24,671,074	▲2	▲0.5%
31.	Singapore Changi Airport	Changi, Singapore	SIN/WSSS	24,664,137	▼9	▼14.9%
32.	(China) Beijing Capital International Airport	Chaoyang-Shunyi, Beijing, China	PEK/ZBAA	24,355,940	▼6	▼10.3%
33.	(Germany) Munich Airport	Erding, Bavaria, Germany	MUC/EDDM	24,193,304	▲2	▲4.4%
34.	(United States) Charlotte Douglas International Airport	Charlotte, North Carolina, United States	CLT/KCLT	23,060,600	Steady	▼2.4%
35.	(United States) Logan International Airport	Boston, Massachusetts, United States	BOS/KBOS	22,778,495	▲2	▲0.2%
36.	(Spain) Barcelona–El Prat Airport	El Prat de Llobregat, Catalonia, Spain	BCN/LEBL	22,748,758	▲2	▲6.6%
37.	(United States) LaGuardia Airport	Queens, New York, New York, United States	LGA/KLGA	22,470,046	▲2	▲2.3%
38.	(France) Paris-Orly Airport	Orly, Île-de-France, France	ORY/LFPO	22,390,236	▼2	▼3.3%
39.	Mexico City International Airport	Venustiano Carranza, Mexico City, Mexico	MEX/MMMX	21,696,732	▲?	▲5.7%
40.	(United States) Cincinnati/Northern Kentucky International Airport	Hebron, Kentucky, United States	CVG/KCVG	21,228,402	▲?	▲2.0%
41.	(United States) St. Louis Lambert International Airport	St. Louis County, Missouri, United States	STL/KSTL	20,430,428	▼11	▼20.5%
42.	(United States) Baltimore/Washington International Airport	Anne Arundel County, Maryland, United States	BWI/KBWI	20,045,986	▲?	▲5.4%
43.	(South Korea) Seoul Incheon International Airport	Jung District, Incheon, Republic of Korea	ICN/RKSI	19,937,146	▼3	▲5.3%
44.	(United Kingdom) Manchester Airport	Ringway, Manchester, England, United Kingdom	MAN/EGCC	19,867,912	▲?	▲4.6%
45.	(Indonesia) Soekarno-Hatta International Airport	Cengkareng, Jakarta, Java, Indonesia	CGK/WIII	19,722,902	▲?	▲33.0%
46.	(United States) Daniel K. Inouye International Airport	Honolulu, Hawaii, United States	HNL/PHNL	19,623,217	▲?	▼1.2%
47.	(Spain) Palma de Mallorca Airport	Palma de Mallorca, Balearic Islands, Spain	PMI/LEPA	19,179,018	▲?	▲7.6%
48.	(Japan) Osaka International Airport	Itami, Hyōgo, Kansai, Honshū, Japan	ITM/RJOO	18,849,418	▲?	▲6.9%
49.	(Japan) Fukuoka Airport	Fukuoka, Fukuoka, Kyūshū, Japan	FUK/RJFF	18,778,538	▲?	▼3.7%
50.	(United Kingdom) London Stansted Airport	Uttlesford, Essex, England, United Kingdom	STN/EGSS	18,716,692	▲?	▲16.6%

== 2002 statistics ==
Airports Council International's final full year figures are as follows:

Rank	Airport	Location	Code (IATA/ICAO)	Total passengers	Rank change	% change
1.	(United States) Hartsfield-Jackson Atlanta International Airport	Atlanta, Georgia, United States	ATL/KATL	78,876,128	Steady	▲1.3%
2.	(United States) O'Hare International Airport	Chicago, Illinois, United States	ORD/KORD	66,501,496	Steady	▼1.3%
3.	(United Kingdom) London Heathrow Airport	Hillingdon, Greater London, United Kingdom	LHR/EGLL	63,338,649	▲1	▲4.3%
4.	(Japan) Tokyo Haneda Airport	Ōta, Tokyo, Kantō, Honshū, Japan	HND/RJTT	61,079,478	▲1	▲4.7%
5.	(United States) Los Angeles International Airport	Los Angeles, California United States	LAX/KLAX	56,198,447	▼2	▼8.8%
6.	(United States) Dallas/Fort Worth International Airport	Dallas/Fort Worth, Texas, United States	DFW/KDFW	52,826,304	Steady	▼4.2%
7.	(Germany) Frankfurt Airport	Frankfurt, Hesse, Germany	FRA/EDDF	48,450,357	Steady	▼0.2%
8.	(France) Paris-Charles de Gaulle Airport	Roissy-en-France, Paris, Île-de-France, France	CDG/LFPG	48,303,439	Steady	▲0.6%
9.	(Netherlands) Amsterdam Airport Schiphol	Haarlemmermeer, North Holland, Netherlands	AMS/EHAM	40,736,009	Steady	▲3.0%
10.	(United States) Denver International Airport	Denver, Colorado, United States	DEN/KDEN	35,651,098	Steady	▼1.2%
11.	(United States) Phoenix Sky Harbor International Airport	Phoenix, Maricopa, Arizona, United States	PHX/KPHL	35,534,463	Steady	▲0.3%
12.	(United States) McCarran International Airport	Las Vegas, Nevada, Nevada, United States	LAS/KLAS	35,009,011	Steady	▼0.5%
13.	(United States) George Bush Intercontinental Airport	Houston, Texas, United States	IAH/KIAH	33,946,484	▼1	▼2.2%
14.	(Spain) Madrid-Barajas Airport	Barajas, Madrid, Spain	MAD/LEMD	33,903,553	▲3	▼0.4%
15.	Hong Kong International Airport	Chek Lap Kok, Hong Kong	HKG/VHHH	33,882,463	▲2	▲4.1%
16.	(United States) Minneapolis-Saint Paul International Airport	Minneapolis-Saint Paul, Minnesota, United States	MSP/KMSP	32,630,177	▼1	▼3.3%
17.	(United States) Detroit Metropolitan Wayne County Airport	Detroit, Michigan, United States	DTW/KDTW	32,436,999	▲1	▼0.5%
18.	(Thailand) Bangkok International Airport	Don Mueang, Bangkok, Thailand	DMK/VTBD	32,177,245	▲3	▲5.1%
19.	(United States) San Francisco International Airport	San Francisco, California, United States	SFO/KSFO	31,447,750	▼5	▼9.2%
20.	(United States) Miami International Airport	Miami, Florida, United States	MIA/KMIA	30,060,241	▼1	▼5.1%
21.	(United Kingdom) London Gatwick Airport	Crawley, West Sussex, England, United Kingdom	LGW/EGKK	29,628,441	▼2	▼5.0%
22.	Singapore Changi Airport	Changi, Singapore	SIN/WSSS	28,979,344	▲1	▲3.2%
23.	(United States) Newark Liberty International Airport	Newark, New Jersey, United States	EWR/KEWR	28,972,253	▼1	▼6.9%
24.	(Japan) Narita International Airport	Narita, Chiba, Kantō, Honshū, Japan	NRT/RJAA	28,894,925	▲5	▲13.9%
25.	(United States) John F. Kennedy International Airport	Queens, New York, New York, United States	JFK/KJFK	28,888,686	▲2	▼1.8%
26.	(China) Beijing Capital International Airport	Chaoyang-Shunyi, Beijing, China	PEK/ZBAA	27,159,665	▲?	▲12.3%
27.	(United States) Seattle-Tacoma International Airport	SeaTac, Washington, United States	SEA/KSEA	26,688,127	Steady	▼1.3%
28.	(United States) Orlando International Airport	Orlando, Florida, United States	MCO/KMCO	26,650,975	▼4	▼5.7%
29.	(Canada) Toronto Pearson International Airport	Mississauga, Ontario, Canada	YYZ/CYYZ	25,930,293	▼3	▼7.5%
30.	(United States) Lambert-Saint Louis International Airport	Saint Louis, Missouri, United States	STL/KSTL	25,613,969	▼2	▼4.1%
31.	(Italy) Leonardo da Vinci Airport	Fiumicino, Rome, Lazio, Italy	FCO/LIRF	25,340,789	▼2	▼0.9%
32.	(United States) Philadelphia International Airport	Philadelphia, Pennsylvania, United States	PHL/KPHL	24,402,259	▲?	▲1.1%
33.	(Australia) Sydney Airport	Mascot, Sydney, New South Wales, Australia	SYD/YSSY	23,893,168	▲?	▼3.8%
34.	(United States) Charlotte Douglas International Airport	Charlotte, North Carolina, United States	CLT/KCLT	23,613,142	▲?	▲1.9%
35.	(Germany) Munich Airport	Erding, Bavaria, Germany	MUC/EDDM	23,163,720	▲?	▼2.0%
36.	(France) Paris-Orly Airport	Orly, Île-de-France, France	ORY/LFPO	23,161,849	▲?	▲0.6%
37.	(United States) Logan International Airport	Boston, Massachusetts, United States	BOS/KBOS	22,624,255	▲?	▼7.2%
38.	(Spain) Barcelona–El Prat Airport	El Prat de Llobregat, Catalonia, Spain	BCN/LEBL	21,344,621	▲?	▲2.9%
39.	(United States) LaGuardia Airport	Queens, New York, New York, United States	LGA/KLGA	21,271,069	▲?	▼5.6%
40.	(South Korea) Seoul Incheon International Airport	Jung District, Incheon, Republic of Korea	ICN/RKSI	21,057,093	▲?	▲44.4%

== 2001 statistics ==
Airports Council International's final full year figures are as follows:

Rank	Airport	Location	Code (IATA/ICAO)	Total passengers	Rank change	% change
1.	(United States) Hartsfield-Jackson Atlanta International Airport	Atlanta, Georgia, United States	ATL/KATL	75,858,590	Steady	▼5.4%
2.	(United States) O'Hare International Airport	Chicago, Illinois, United States	ORD/KORD	67,448,064	Steady	▼6.5%
3.	(United States) Los Angeles International Airport	Los Angeles, California, United States	LAX/KLAX	61,606,204	Steady	▼8.5%
4.	(United Kingdom) London Heathrow Airport	Hillingdon, Greater London, United Kingdom	LHR/EGLL	60,743,084	Steady	▼6.0%
5.	(Japan) Tokyo Haneda Airport	Ōta, Tokyo, Kantō, Honshū, Japan	HND/RJTT	58,692,688	▲1	▲4.1%
6.	(United States) Dallas/Fort Worth International Airport	Dallas/Fort Worth, Texas, United States	DFW/KDFW	55,150,693	▼1	▼9.2%
7.	(Germany) Frankfurt Airport	Frankfurt, Hesse, Germany	FRA/EDDF	48,559,980	Steady	▼1.6%
8.	(France) Paris-Charles de Gaulle Airport	Roissy-en-France, Paris, Île-de-France, France	CDG/LFPG	47,996,529	Steady	▼0.5%
9.	(Netherlands) Amsterdam Airport Schiphol	Haarlemmermeer, North Holland, Netherlands	AMS/EHAM	39,531,123	▲1	▼0.2%
10.	(United States) Denver International Airport	Denver, Colorado, United States	DEN/KDEN	36,092,806	▲1	▼6.9%
11.	(United States) Phoenix Sky Harbor International Airport	Phoenix, Maricopa, Arizona, United States	PHX/KPHL	35,439,031	▲4	▼1.7%
12.	(United States) McCarran International Airport	Las Vegas, Nevada, Nevada, United States	LAS/KLAS	35,180,960	Steady	▼4.6%
13.	(United States) George Bush Intercontinental Airport	Houston, Texas, United States	IAH/KIAH	34,803,580	▲4	▼1.3%
14.	(United States) San Francisco International Airport	San Francisco, California, United States	SFO/KSFO	34,632,474	▼5	▼15.6%
15.	(United States) Minneapolis-Saint Paul International Airport	Minneapolis-Saint Paul, Minnesota, United States	MSP/KMSP	34,308,389	▼2	▼6.7%
16.	(Spain) Madrid-Barajas Airport	Barajas, Madrid, Spain	MAD/LEMD	34,047,931	▲4	▲3.5%
17.	Hong Kong International Airport	Chek Lap Kok, Hong Kong	HKG/VHHH	32,546,029	▲5	▼0.6%
18.	(United States) Detroit Metropolitan Wayne County Airport	Detroit, Michigan, United States	DTW/KDTW	32,294,121	▼2	▼9.1%
19.	(United States) Miami International Airport	Miami, Florida, United States	MIA/KMIA	31,668,450	Steady	▼5.8%
20.	(United Kingdom) London Gatwick Airport	Crawley, West Sussex, England, United Kingdom	LGW/EGKK	31,182,364	▲3	▼2.8%
21.	(Thailand) Bangkok International Airport	Don Mueang, Bangkok, Thailand	DMK/VTBD	30,623,366	▲5	▲3.4%
22.	(United States) Newark Liberty International Airport	Newark, New Jersey, United States	EWR/KEWR	30,558,000	▼4	▼10.6%
23.	(United States) John F. Kennedy International Airport	Queens, New York, New York, United States	JFK/KJFK	29,349,000	▼2	▼10.7%
24.	(United States) Orlando International Airport	Orlando, Florida, United States	MCO/KMCO	28,253,248	Steady	▼8.3%
25.	Singapore Changi Airport	Changi, Singapore	SIN/WSSS	28,093,759	▲3	▼1.8%
26.	(Canada) Toronto Pearson International Airport	Mississauga, Ontario, Canada	YYZ/CYYZ	28,042,692	▲1	▼3.1%
27.	(United States) Seattle-Tacoma International Airport	SeaTac, Washington, United States	SEA/KSEA	27,036,073	▲2	▼4.8%
28.	(United States) Lambert-Saint Louis International Airport	Saint Louis, Missouri, United States	STL/KSTL	26,695,019	▼3	▼12.7%
29.	(Italy) Leonardo da Vinci Airport	Fiumicino, Rome, Lazio, Italy	FCO/LIRF	25,565,727	▲?	▼2.7%
30.	(Japan) Narita International Airport	Narita, Chiba, Kantō, Honshū, Japan	NRT/RJAA	25,379,370	▲?	▼7.3%

== 2000 statistics ==
Airports Council International's final full year figures are as follows:

Rank	Airport	Location	Code	Total passengers	% change
1.	(United States) Hartsfield-Jackson Atlanta International Airport	Atlanta, Georgia, United States	ATL	80,162,407	▲0.6
2.	(United States) O'Hare International Airport	Chicago, Illinois, United States	ORD	72,144,244	▲2.7
3.	(United States) Los Angeles International Airport	Los Angeles, California United States	LAX	66,424,767	▲4.8
4.	(United Kingdom) London Heathrow Airport	Hillingdon, Greater London, United Kingdom	LHR	64,606,826	▲3.8
5.	(United States) Dallas/Fort Worth International Airport	Dallas/Fort Worth, Texas, United States	DFW	60,687,122	▲1.1
6.	(Japan) Tokyo Haneda Airport	Ōta, Tokyo, Kantō, Honshū, Japan	HND	56,402,206	▲3.8
7.	(Germany) Frankfurt Airport	Frankfurt, Hesse, Germany	FRA/EDDF	49,360,630	▲7.6
8.	(France) Charles de Gaulle Airport	Roissy-en-France, Paris, Île-de-France, France	CDG/LFPG	48,246,137	▲10.6
9.	(United States) San Francisco International Airport	San Francisco, California, United States	SFO	41,040,995	▲1.8
10.	(Netherlands) Amsterdam Airport Schiphol	Haarlemmermeer, North Holland, Netherlands	AMS/EHAM	39,606,925	▲7.7
11.	(United States) Denver International Airport	Denver, Colorado, United States	DEN	38,751,687	▲1.9
12.	(United States) McCarran International Airport	Las Vegas, Clark, Nevada, United States	LAS	36,865,866	▲9
13.	(United States) Minneapolis-Saint Paul International Airport	Minneapolis-Saint Paul, Minnesota, United States	MSP	36,751,632	▲5.8
14.	(South Korea) Gimpo International Airport	Seoul, South Korea	GMP	36,727,124	▲10.1
15.	(United States) Phoenix Sky Harbor International Airport	Phoenix, Arizona, United States	PHX	36,040,469	▲7.4
16.	(United States) Detroit Metropolitan Wayne County Airport	Detroit, Michigan, United States	DTW	35,535,080	▲4.6
17.	(United States) George Bush Intercontinental Airport	Houston, Texas, United States	IAH	35,251,372	▲6.7
18.	(United States) Newark Liberty International Airport	Newark, New Jersey, United States	EWR	34,188,468	▲1.7
19.	(United States) Miami International Airport	Miami, Florida, United States	MIA	33,621,273	▲0.8
20.	(Spain) Madrid-Barajas Airport	Barajas, Madrid, Spain	MAD	32,893,190	▲17.5
21.	(United States) John F. Kennedy International Airport	Queens, New York City, New York, United States	JFK	32,856,220	▲3.7
22.	Hong Kong International Airport	Chek Lap Kok, Hong Kong	HKG	32,752,359	▲10.2
23.	(United Kingdom) London Gatwick Airport	Crawley, West Sussex, South East, England, United Kingdom	LGW	32,065,685	▲4.9
24.	(United States) Orlando International Airport	Orlando, Florida, United States	MCO	30,823,509	▲5.6
25.	(United States) Lambert-Saint Louis International Airport	Saint Louis, Missouri, United States	STL	30,561,387	▲1.2
26.	(Thailand) Bangkok International Airport	Don Mueang, Bangkok, Thailand	BKK	29,616,432	▲8.5
27.	(Canada) Toronto Pearson International Airport	Mississauga, Ontario, Canada	YYZ	28,930,036	▲4.1
28.	Singapore Changi Airport	Changi, Singapore	SIN	28,618,200	▲9.8
29.	(United States) Seattle-Tacoma International Airport	SeaTac, Washington, United States	SEA	28,408,553	▲2.5
30.	(United States) Logan International Airport	Boston and Town of Winthrop, Massachusetts, United States	BOS	27,412,926	▲1.3

== See also ==
- List of busiest airports by international passenger traffic
- List of busiest airports by cargo traffic
- List of busiest airports by aircraft movements
- List of the busiest airports in the United States
- List of the busiest airports in Europe
