= Feria de Madrid (Madrid Metro) =

Madrid Metro station

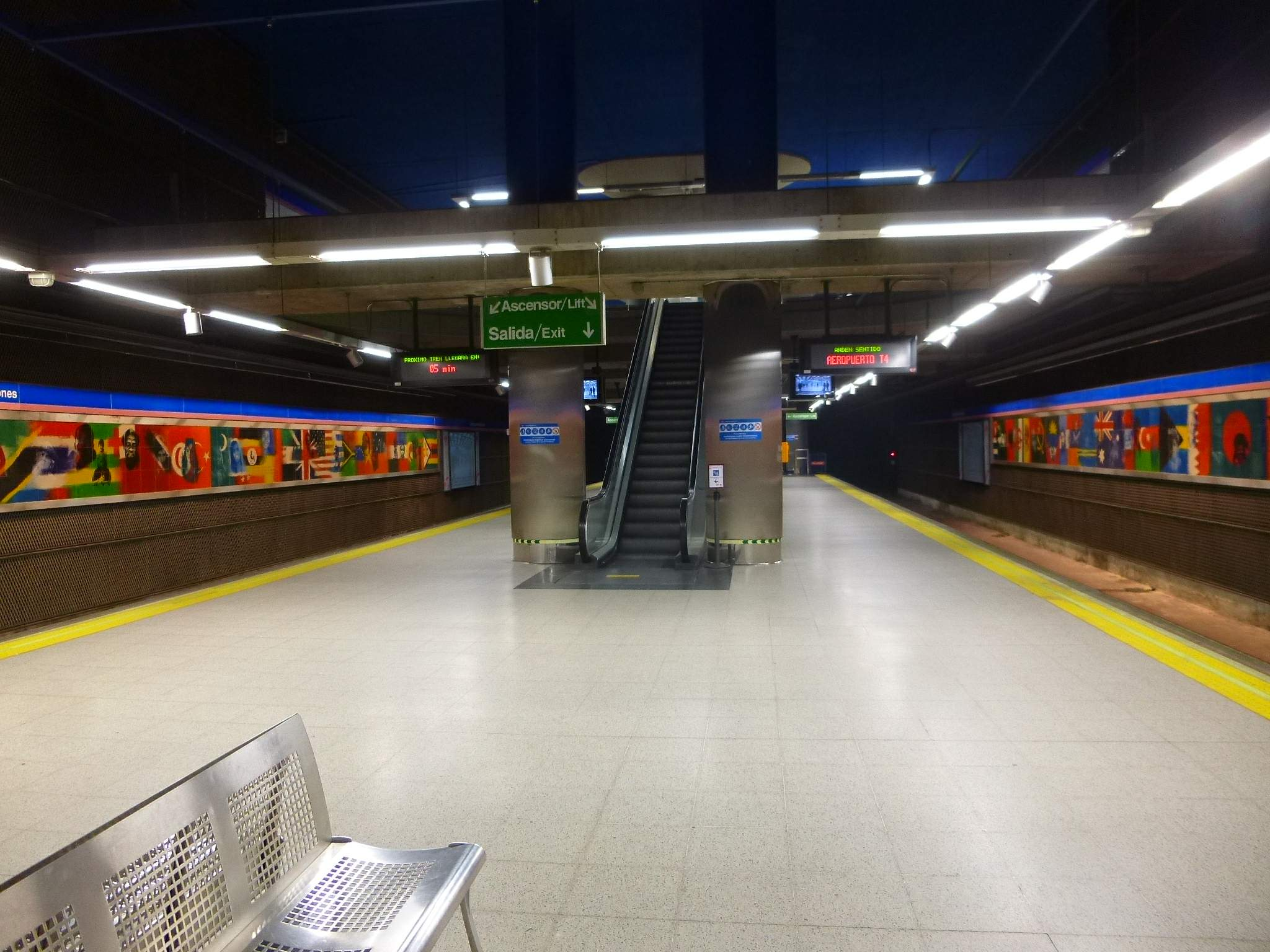

General information
- Location: Barajas, Madrid; Spain
- Coordinates: 40.4638952°N 3.6162032°W
- System: Madrid Metro station
- Owner: CRTM
- Operator: CRTM

Construction
- Accessible: yes

Other information
- Fare zone: A

History
- Opened: 24 June 1998; 28 years ago

Services
Preceding station	Madrid Metro	Following station
Mar de Cristal towards Nuevos Ministerios	Line 8	Aeropuerto T1-T2-T3 towards Aeropuerto T4
Location
- Location within Madrid

Feria de Madrid ([ˈfeɾja ðe maˈðɾið], "Madrid Fair"; previously "Campo de las Naciones") is a station on Line 8 of the Madrid Metro. It is located in fare Zone A. It gives service to IFEMA ("Fair Institution of Madrid"), an event center which holds, among other trade fairs, the Cibeles Madrid Fashion Week, as well as Formula 1's annual Spanish Grand Prix from 2026 onwards. It's also next to Parque Juan Carlos I, one of the most important parks in Madrid.

The name of the station was changed to Feria de Madrid in June 2017.
