= Line 8 (Madrid Metro) =

Rapid transit line of the Madrid Metro

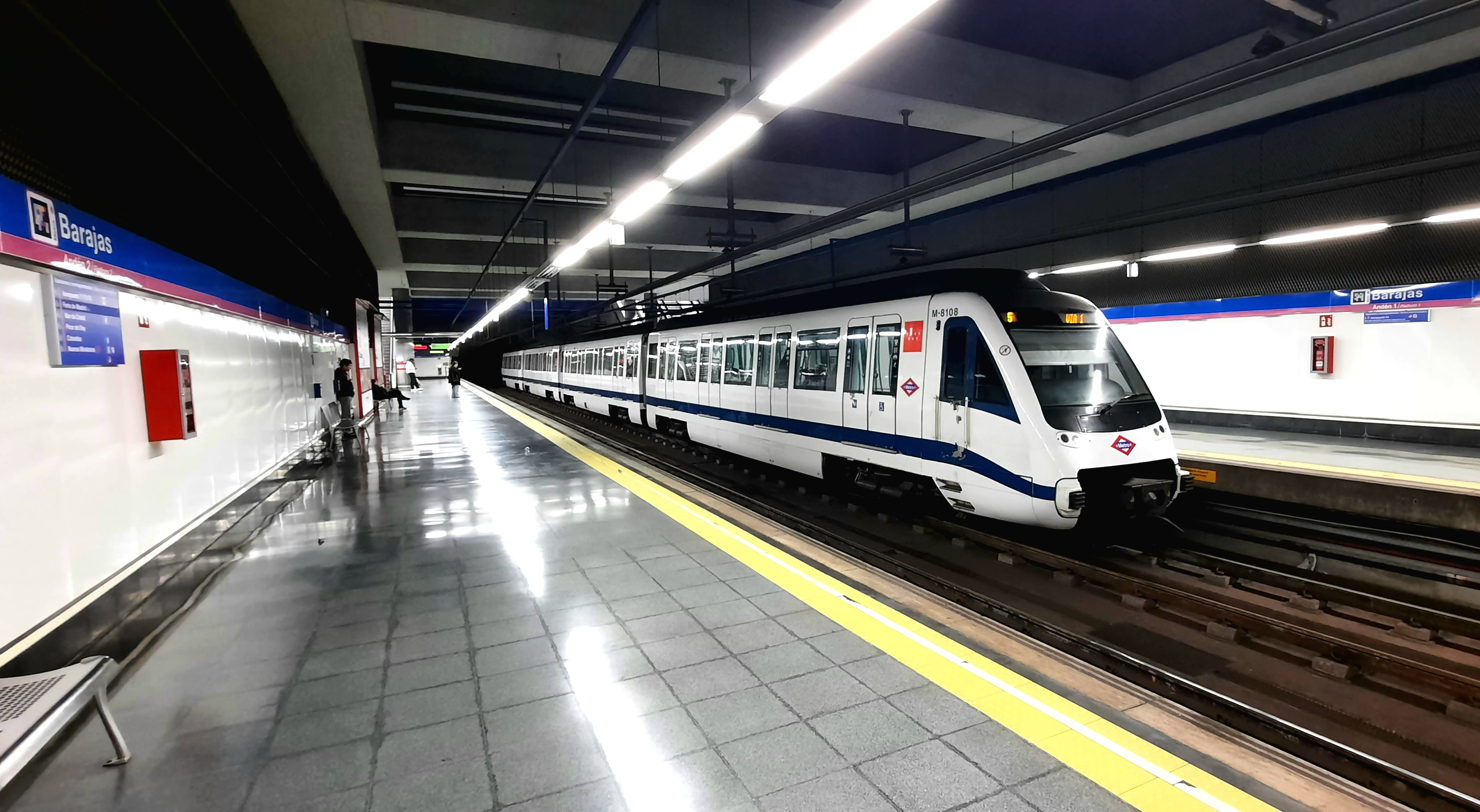
- A Class 8000 train at Barajas station

Overview
- Native name: Línea 8
- Owner: CRTM
- Locale: Madrid
- Termini: Nuevos Ministerios; Aeropuerto T4
- Stations: 8
- Website: www.metromadrid.es/en/linea/linea-8

Service
- Type: Rapid transit
- System: Madrid Metro
- Operator: CRTM
- Rolling stock: CAF 8000

History
- Opened: 24 June 1998; 28 years ago
- Last extension: 2007

Technical
- Line length: 16.467 km (10.232 mi)
- Character: Underground, at-grade
- Track gauge: 1,445 mm (4 ft 8 7/8 in)

Line map

Line 8 of the Madrid Metro opened between Mar de Cristal and Campo de las Naciones (now Feria de Madrid) on 24 June 1998. An extension to Barajas via Madrid Airport was opened in 1999 and in 2002 an extension to Nuevos Ministerios and Colombia opened. Originally this line was a small-profile line, but in 2002 it became a large rolling stock line. The line uses 4-car versions of class 8000 trains. In 2007 an intermediate station called Pinar del Rey opened between Colombia and Mar de Cristal, as did an extension to the new Terminal 4 of Madrid Airport.

The line was temporarily closed for renovation from 26 January to 12 April 2017.

== History ==
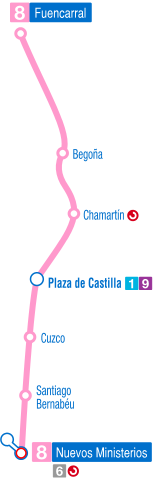
Route map of old line 8

=== Original Line 8 ===
As part of network extension plans in the 1970s, the construction of a north–south line along the Castellana-Recoletos-Prado axis originating in Fuencarral and headed toward Madrid Atocha and further to the south was initiated. The southern stretch toward Carabanchel is now the current Line 11. From this project the construction of the section between Fuencarral and Nuevos Ministerios which opened on 9 June 1982 on the occasion of the celebration of the World Cup in Spain began, as the line gave service to Santiago Bernabéu Stadium.

Given the economic difficulties of the Metro in the 1970s and 1980s, the rest of the project from the original Line 8 was discarded, and instead only tunnel that connected via line 8 to line 7 is enabled. This way, on Tuesday 23 December 1986, the extension of line 8 from Nuevos Ministerios and Americas Avenue was opened.

=== Current Line ===
The project developed between 1995 and 1998 to merge lines 8 and 10 by building a tunnel between Alonso Martínez and Nuevos Ministerios, left down the stretch Nuevos Ministerios - Avenida de America. Subsequently, on 10 December 1996 the tunnel was opened, after which the line 8 disappeared to lease its infrastructure to line 10. To make this possible, it was necessary to install the platforms projections because, since then, the stretch began to exploit narrow gauge trains.

== Future ==
An additional station called Corralejos is planned to be built between Feria de Madrid and Aeropuerto T1-T2-T3, where transfer to the planned line 5 extension will be made.

Plans also exist to extend Line 8 in the future beyond Nuevos Ministerios. A date for this extension has not yet been given, as it is only in the planning stage. All proposed stops, with the exception of Prado, are existing Metro or Cercanías stations. These stations, along with their connecting services, include:

- Gregorio Marañón (Lines 7 and 10)
- Rubén Darío (Line 5)
- Colón (Line 4)
- Recoletos (Renfe intercity services)
- Banco de España (Line 2)
- Prado
- Atocha (Line 1), future (Line 11, Cercanías Madrid, and Renfe intercity services)
- Mendez Alvaro (Line 6) and Renfe intercity services)

== Stations ==
District	Station	Opened	Zone	Connections
Chamartín / Chamberí / Tetuán	Nuevos Ministerios	2002	A	Madrid Metro: Cercanías Madrid: Renfe Media Distancia: 53
Chamartín	Colombia	2002	A	Madrid Metro:
Hortaleza	Pinar del Rey	2007	A	
Hortaleza	Mar de Cristal	1998	A	Madrid Metro:
Barajas	Feria de Madrid	1998	A	
Barajas	Aeropuerto T1-T2-T3	1999	A	
Barajas	Barajas	1999	A	
Barajas	Aeropuerto T4	2007	A	Cercanías Madrid:

== See also ==
- Madrid
- Transport in Madrid
- List of Madrid Metro stations
- List of metro systems
