= Barajas (Madrid Metro) =

Madrid Metro station

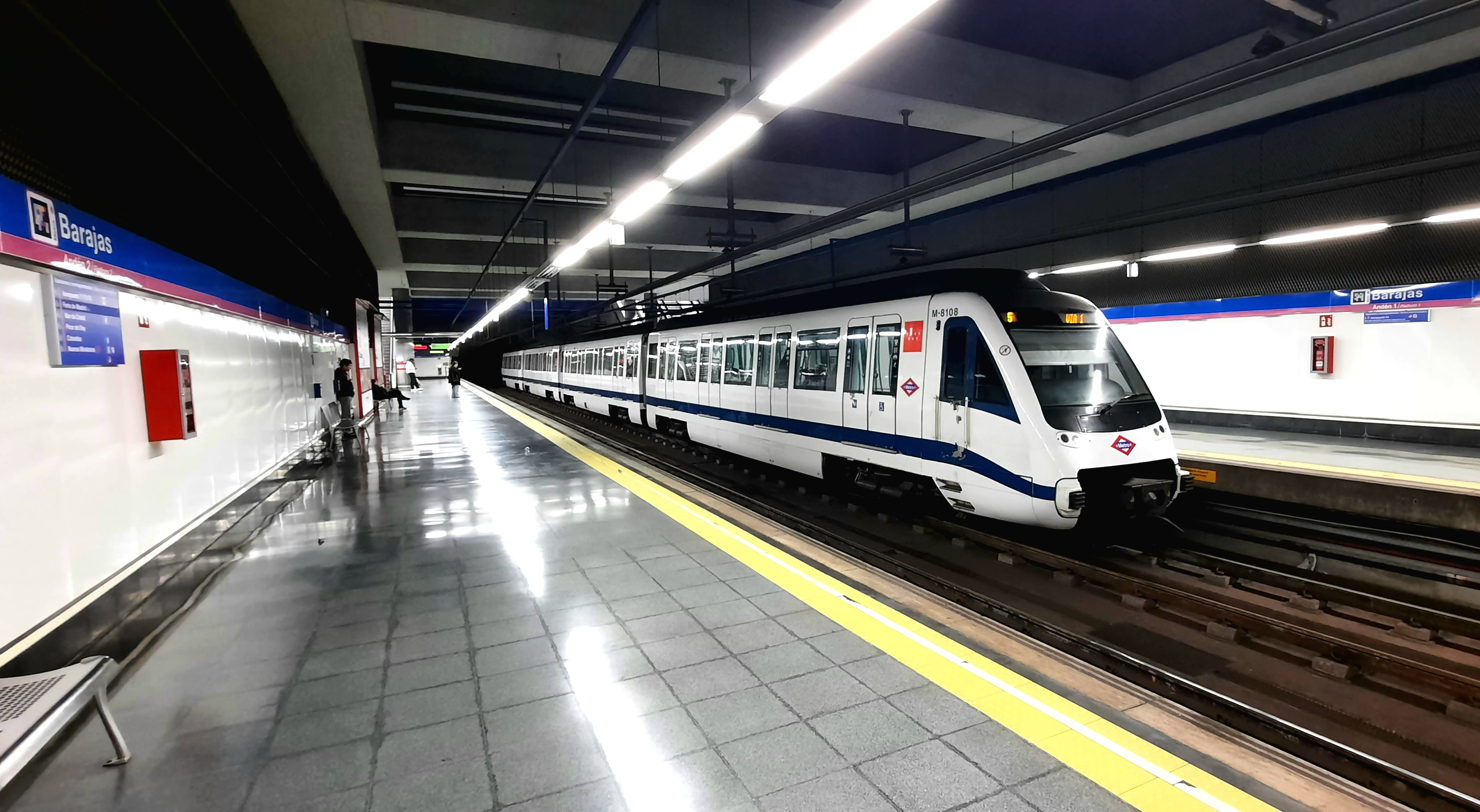

General information
- Location: Barajas, Madrid; Spain
- Coordinates: 40.4758011°N 3.5826118°W
- System: Madrid Metro station
- Owner: CRTM
- Operator: CRTM

Construction
- Accessible: yes

Other information
- Fare zone: A

History
- Opened: 7 September 1999; 27 years ago

Services
| Preceding station | Madrid Metro | Following station |
|---|---|---|
| Aeropuerto T1-T2-T3 towards Nuevos Ministerios | Line 8 | Aeropuerto T4 Terminus |
Location
- Location within Madrid

Barajas [baˈɾa.xas] is a station on Line 8 of the Madrid Metro, serving the Barajas barrio. It is located in fare Zone A.
