= Pinar del Rey (Madrid Metro) =

Madrid Metro station

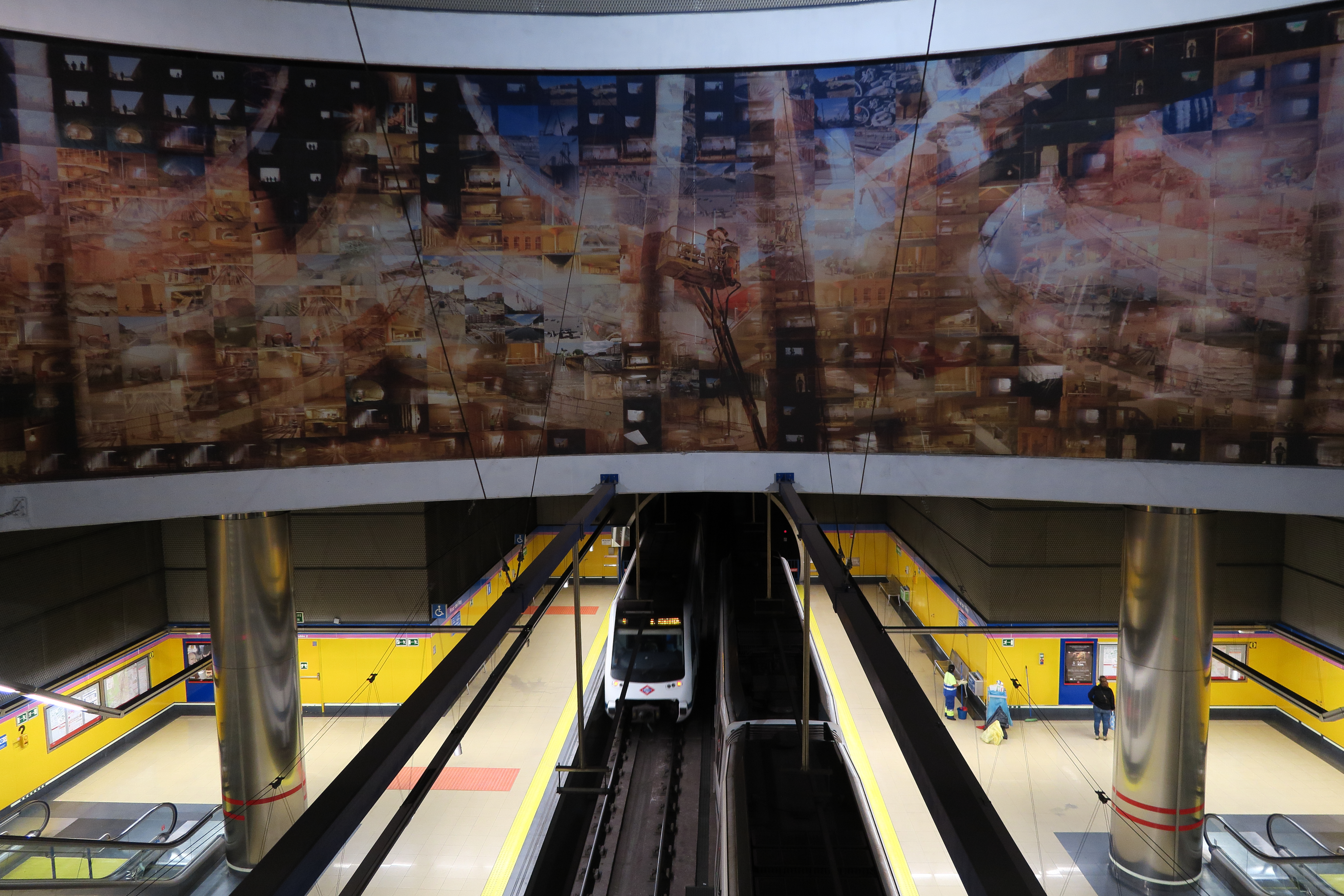

General information
- Location: Hortaleza, Madrid; Spain
- Coordinates: 40.4679975°N 3.6486679°W
- System: Madrid Metro station
- Owner: CRTM
- Operator: CRTM

Construction
- Accessible: yes

Other information
- Fare zone: A

History
- Opened: 15 January 2007; 19 years ago

Services
Preceding station	Madrid Metro	Following station
Colombia towards Nuevos Ministerios	Line 8	Mar de Cristal towards Aeropuerto T4
Location
- Location within Madrid

Pinar del Rey [piˈnaɾ ðel ˈrej] is a station on Line 8 of the Madrid Metro, serving the Pinar del Rey ("King's Pine Grove") barrio. It is located in fare Zone A.
