= Aeropuerto (Madrid) =

Coordinates: 40°29′39″N 3°34′1″W

- Ward
- Aeropuerto in Barajas district
- Country: Spain
- Aut. community: Madrid
- Municipality: Madrid
- District: Barajas

Aeropuerto is a ward (barrio) of Madrid belonging to the district of Barajas. Its borders are coterminous with those of the Adolfo Suárez Madrid-Barajas Airport, after which it is named.
