= Aeropuerto T1-T2-T3 (Madrid Metro) =

Madrid Metro station

General information
- Location: Barajas, Madrid; Spain
- Coordinates: 40.468647°N 3.5696521°W
- System: Madrid Metro station
- Owner: CRTM
- Operator: CRTM

Construction
- Accessible: yes

Other information
- Fare zone: A

History
- Opened: 14 June 1999; 27 years ago

Services
Preceding station	Madrid Metro	Following station
Feria de Madrid towards Nuevos Ministerios	Line 8	Barajas towards Aeropuerto T4
Location
- Location within Madrid

Aeropuerto T1-T2-T3 ([aeɾoˈpweɾto te ˈuno te ˈðos te ˈtɾes], "Airport Terminals 1–2–3") is a station on Line 8 of the Madrid Metro next to terminal T2 of Adolfo Suárez Madrid–Barajas Airport, in the Madrid district of the same name. It is located in fare Zone A.

The station opened to the public on 14 June 1999 under the name Aeropuerto. The line was opened by the King and Queen of Spain along with the chairman of the Community of Madrid. Construction of the expansion of line 8 was funded by the European Union Cohesion Fund.

On 3 May 2007 the station was renamed Aeropuerto T1, T2, T3, after the Terminal 4 extension opened.
