= Madrid–Barajas Airport =

International airport serving Madrid, Spain

Madrid–Barajas Airport Aeropuerto Adolfo Suárez Madrid–Barajas

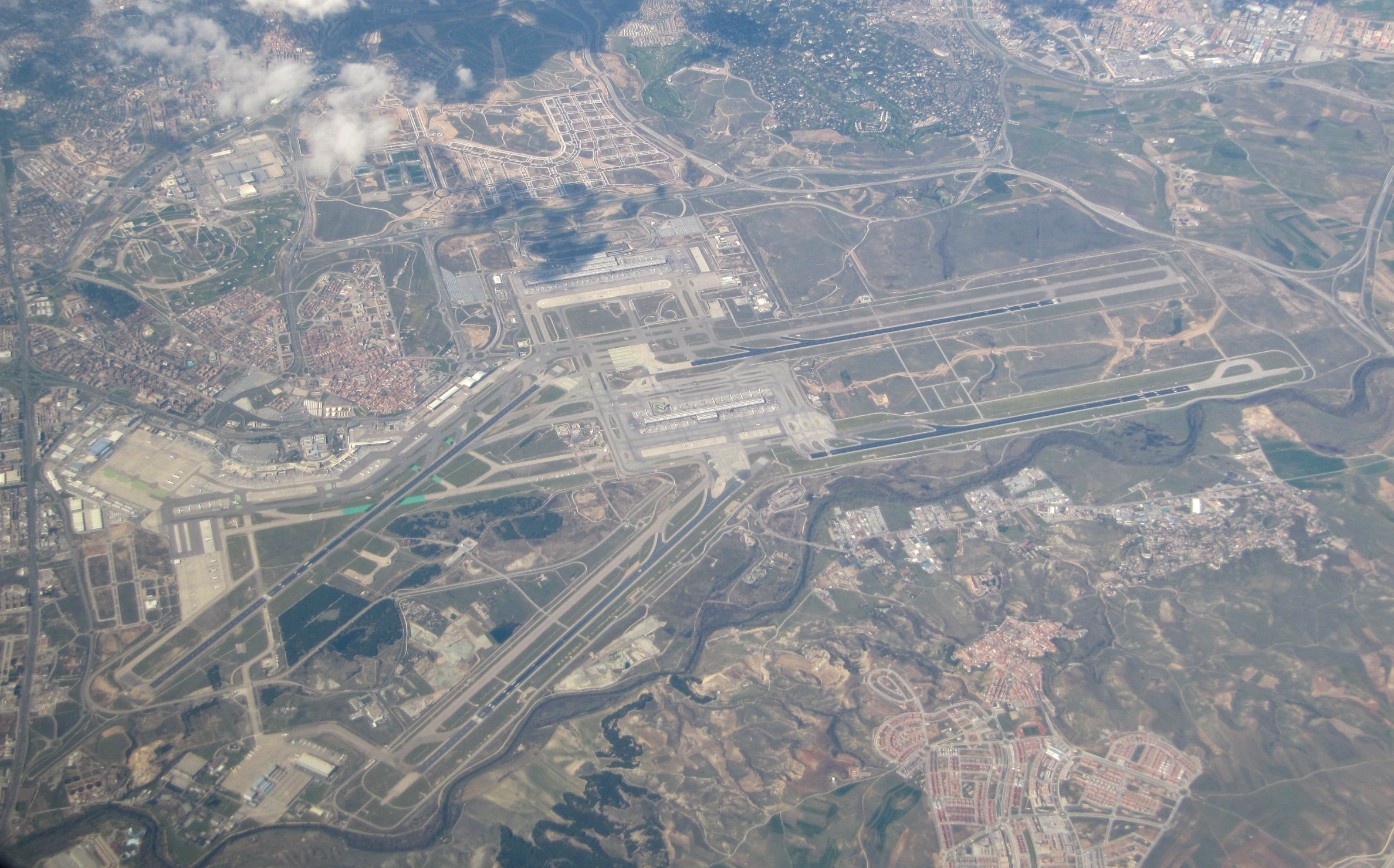
- Aerial view of the airport
- IATA: MAD; ICAO: LEMD; WMO: 08221

Summary
- Airport type: Public
- Owner/Operator: AENA
- Serves: Madrid metropolitan area
- Location: Barajas, Madrid, Spain
- Opened: 22 April 1931; 95 years ago
- Hub for: Air Europa; Iberia; Iberia Express; Iberia Regional; Plus Ultra Líneas Aéreas; World2Fly
- Operating base for: Iberojet; Ryanair; Volotea; Wamos Air; Wizz Air (from October 2026)
- Elevation AMSL: 609 m (1,998 ft)
- Coordinates: 40°28′20″N 003°33′39″W
- Website: Official website

Maps
- Airport map

- Location within Spain

Runways
Direction	Length		Surface
Direction	m	ft	Surface
14R/32L	4,100	13,451	Asphalt
14L/32R	3,500	11,482	Asphalt
18R/36L	4,350	14,271	Asphalt
18L/36R	3,500	11,482	Asphalt

Statistics (2025)
- Passengers: 68,179,054 ▲3.0%
- Aircraft Movements: 430,616 ▲2.5%
- Economic impact (2012): $10.9 billion
- Social impact (2012): 130,900
- Sources: Passenger Traffic, AENA; Spanish AIP, AENA

Adolfo Suárez Madrid–Barajas Airport (IATA: MAD, ICAO: LEMD) is the main international airport serving Madrid, the capital of Spain, and its metropolitan area. At 3,050 ha (7,500 acres; 30.5 km^{2}) in area, it is the second-largest airport in Europe by physical size behind Paris Charles de Gaulle Airport. In 2025, 68.1 million passengers travelled through Madrid–Barajas, making it the country's busiest airport as well as Europe's fifth-busiest.

The airport opened in 1931 and has grown to be one of Europe's most important aviation centres. Within the city limits of Madrid, it is 9 kilometres (5.6 miles) from the city's financial district and 13 kilometres (8.1 miles) northeast of the Puerta del Sol or Plaza Mayor de Madrid, Madrid's historic centre. The airport name derives from the adjacent district of Barajas, which has its metro station on the same rail line serving the airport. Barajas serves as the gateway to the Iberian Peninsula from the rest of Europe and the world and is a key link between Europe and Latin America. Following the death of the first Spanish Prime Minister after Francisco Franco's dictatorship, Adolfo Suárez, in 2014, the Spanish Ministry of Public Works and Transport announced that the airport was to be renamed Aeropuerto Adolfo Suárez Madrid–Barajas. The airport is the primary hub and maintenance base for Iberia, Iberia Express, Iberia Regional, Air Europa, Plus Ultra Líneas Aéreas and World2Fly. Consequently, Iberia is responsible for more than 40% of Barajas's traffic. The airport has five passenger terminals: T1, T2, T3, T4 and T4S.

== History ==
=== Early years ===
The airport was constructed in 1927, opening to domestic and international air traffic on 22 April 1931, although regular commercial operations began two years later. A small terminal was constructed with a capacity for 30,000 passengers a year, in addition to several hangars and the building of the Avión Club. The first regular flight was established by Lineas Aéreas Postales Españolas (LAPE) with its route to Barcelona. In the 1930s, flights started to serve some European and African destinations, the first international flights from the airport.

Originally, the flight field was a large circle bordered in white with the name of Madrid in its interior, unpaved, consisting of land covered with natural grass. It was not until the 1940s that the flight field was paved and new runways were designed. The first runway which started operation in 1944 was 1,400 m (4,600 ft) long and 45 m (148 ft) wide. By the end of the decade the airport had three runways, none of which exist today. In the late 1940s, scheduled flights to Latin America and the Philippines started.

In the 1950s, the airport supported over half a million passengers, increasing to five runways and scheduled flights to New York City began. The National Terminal, currently T2, began construction in 1954 and opened later that year. In the Plan of Airports of 1957, Barajas Airport is classified as a first-class international airport. By the 1970s, large jets were landing at Barajas, and the growth of traffic mainly as a result of tourism exceeded forecasts. At the beginning of the decade, the airport reached the 1.2 million passengers, double that envisaged in the Plan of Airports of 1957.

In the 1970s, with the boom in tourism and the arrival of the Boeing 747, the airport reached 4 million passengers and began the construction of the international terminal (current T1). In 1974, Iberia, L.A.E. introduced the shuttle service between Madrid and Barcelona, a service with multiple daily frequencies and available without prior reservation.

The 1982 FIFA World Cup brought significant expansion and modernisation of the airport's two existing terminals.

In the 1990s, the airport expanded further. In 1994, the first cargo terminal was constructed and the control tower was renovated. In 1997, it opened the North Dock, which is used as an exclusive terminal for Iberia's Schengen flights. In 1998, it inaugurated a new control tower, 71 m (233 ft) tall and then in 1999 the new South Dock opened, which implies an expansion of the international terminal. During this time, the distribution of the terminals changed: The south dock and most of the International Terminal were now called T1, the rest of the International Terminal and Domestic Terminal were now called T2 and the north dock was called T3.

In November 1998, the new runway 18R-36L started operations (replacing the previous 18–36), 4,400 m (14,400 ft) long, one of the largest in Europe under expansion plans called Major Barajas. In 2000, it began the construction of new terminals T4 and its satellite, T4S, designed by architects Antonio Lamela, Richard Rogers and Luis Vidal. Two parallel runways to the existing ones were also built.

=== Development since the 2000s ===
The new terminals and runways were completed in 2004, but were not in service until 5 February 2006.

Terminal 4, designed by Antonio Lamela, Richard Rogers and Luis Vidal, (winning team of the 2006 Stirling Prize) and TPS Engineers, (winning team of the 2006 IStructE Award for Commercial Structures) was built by Ferrovial and inaugurated on 5 February 2006. Terminal 4 is one of the world's largest airport terminals in terms of area, with 760,000 square meters (8,180,572 square feet) in separate landside and airside structures. It consists of a main building, T4 (470,000 m^{2} (5,059,038 sq ft)) and a satellite building, T4S (290,000 m^{2} (3,121,534 sq ft)), which are approximately 2 km (1.2 mi) apart. The new Terminal 4 is designed to give passengers a stress-free start to their journey. This is managed through careful use of illumination, with glass panes instead of walls and numerous skylights which allow natural light into the structure. With this new addition, Barajas is designed to handle 70 million passengers annually.

During the construction of Terminal 4, two more runways (15L/33R and 18L/36R) were constructed to aid in the flow of air traffic arriving and departing from Barajas. These runways were officially inaugurated on 5 February 2006 (together with the terminals), but had already been used on several occasions beforehand to test flight and air traffic manoeuvres. Thus, Barajas came to have four runways: two on a north–south axis and parallel to each other (separated by 1.3 km (0.81 mi)) and two on a northwest–southeast axis (and separated by 1.9 km (1.18 mi)). This allowed simultaneous takeoffs and landings into the airport, allowing 120 operations an hour (one takeoff or landing every 30 seconds).

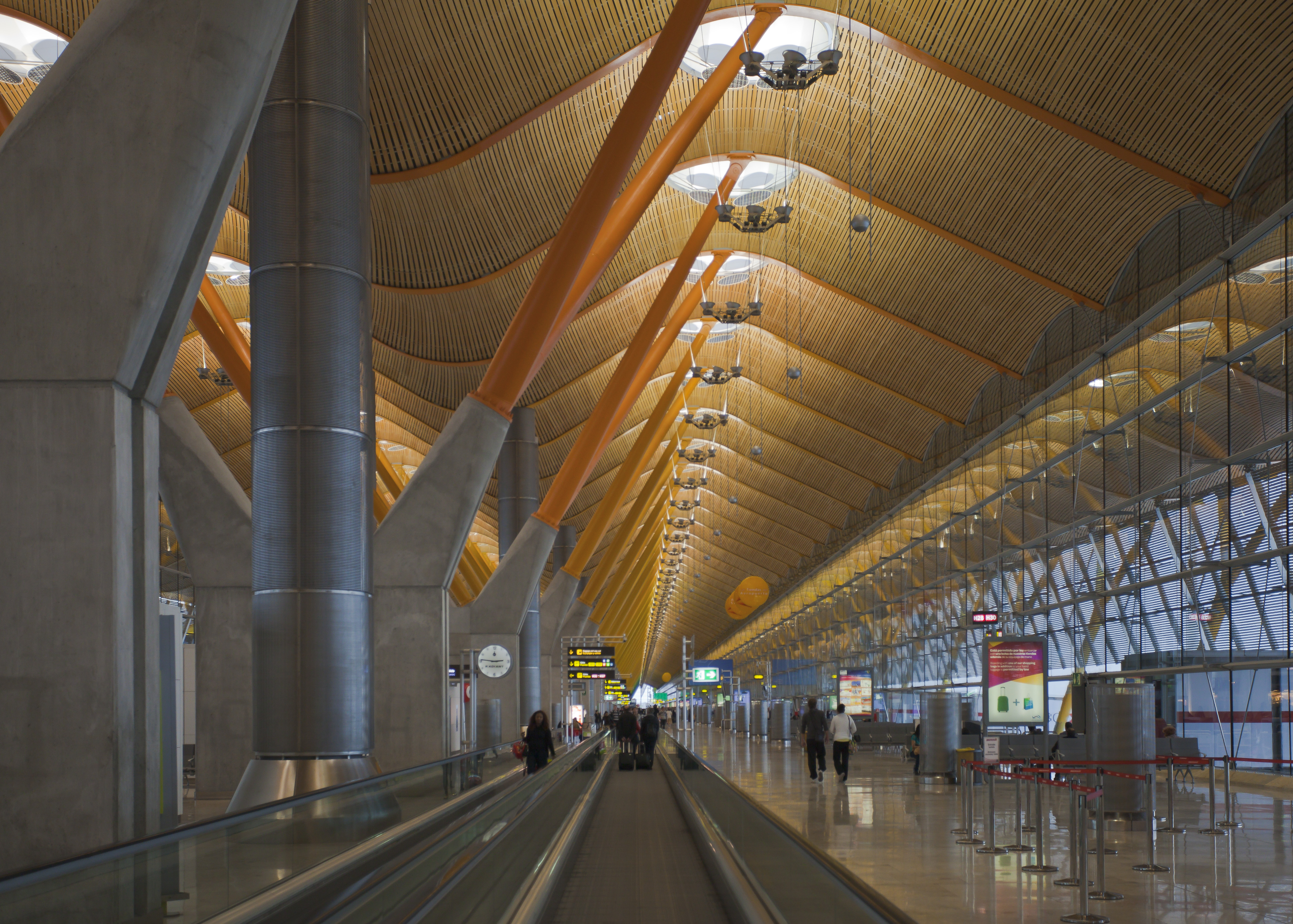
The interior of Terminal 4 includes high ceilings, wood ceiling coverings and large windows.

Terminals 1, 2 and 3 are adjacent terminals that are home to SkyTeam and Star Alliance airlines. Terminal 4 is home to Iberia, its franchise Air Nostrum and all Oneworld partner airlines. Gate numbers are continuous in terminals 1, 2 and 3 (A1 to E89), but are separately numbered in terminal 4 (H, J, K and M, R, S, U in satellite building).

The Madrid–Barcelona air shuttle service, known as the "Puente Aéreo" (in Spanish), literally called "Air Bridge", used to be the world's busiest with 971 flights per week in 2007. The schedule has been reduced since the February 2008 opening of the Madrid–Barcelona high-speed rail line which covers the distance in 2 1/2 hours. Subsequently, the route has been overtaken by London-Dublin and Paris-Toulouse.

On the morning of 30 December 2006, an explosion took place in the carpark building module D attached to Terminal 4. Authorities received a bomb threat at approximately 8:15 local time (7:15 GMT), with the caller stating that a car bomb carried with 800 kg (1,800 lb) of explosive would explode at 9:00 local time (8:00 GMT). After receiving the warning, police were able to evacuate part of the airport. Later, an anonymous caller stated that ETA claims responsibility for the bombing. As a result of the explosion, two Ecuadorians who were sleeping in their cars died. The whole module D of the car park was levelled creating around 40,000 tonnes of debris. It took workers six days to recover the body of the second victim from the rubble.

In 2007, the airport processed more than 52 million passengers. Barajas was voted "Best Airport" in the 2008 Condé Nast Traveller Reader Awards.

In December 2010, the Spanish government announced plans to tender Madrid–Barajas airport to companies in the private sector for a period of up to 40 years.

On 27 January 2012, Spanair suspended all flights affecting Madrid–Barajas as well as other domestic and international connections. On 20 September 2012, both runways 15/33 were renamed as 14R/32L (the longest) and 14L/32R (the shortest).

On 1 August 2015, the first scheduled Airbus A380 flight landed in Madrid-Barajas in a daily service to Dubai by Emirates.

Following the death of former Spanish Prime Minister, Adolfo Suárez, in 2014, the Spanish Ministry of Public Works and Transport announced that the airport would be renamed Aeropuerto Adolfo Suárez, Madrid–Barajas. This renaming seeks recognition for Suárez's role as the first Prime Minister of Spain after the restoration of democracy and his key participation in the transition to democracy after the dictatorship of Francisco Franco.

In late 2018 and early 2019, Iberia renovated its two lounges in Terminal 4, the Dali and Velazquez lounges.

In December 2019, the airport's operator Aena announced plans to expand and renovate the existing installations significantly, increasing their yearly capacity from 70 to 80 million passengers and bridging the architectural gap between the original Terminals 1, 2 and 3 and the newer Terminal 4. The project has a budget of €750 million and was scheduled to be executed over the period from 2022 to 2026.

== Airlines and destinations ==
=== Passenger ===
The following airlines serve regular scheduled flights to and from Madrid.

Airlines	Destinations
Aegean Airlines	Athens
Aer Lingus	Dublin
Aerolíneas Argentinas	Buenos Aires–Ezeiza
Aerolíneas Estelar	Caracas
Aeroméxico	Guadalajara, Mexico City–Benito Juárez, Monterrey
Air Algérie	Algiers
Air Arabia	Casablanca, Tangier
Air Cairo	Seasonal charter: Aswan, Luxor, Sharm El Sheikh
Air Canada	Montréal–Trudeau; Seasonal: Toronto–Pearson
Air China	Beijing Capital, Havana, São Paulo–Guarulhos
Air Europa	A Coruña, Alghero, Alicante, Amsterdam, Asturias, Asunción, Barcelona, Barranquilla (begins 18 December 2026), Bilbao, Bogotá, Bologna, Brussels, Buenos Aires–Ezeiza, Cancún, Caracas, Cordoba (AR), Düsseldorf (resumes 30 November 2026), Frankfurt, Geneva, Gran Canaria, Guayaquil, Havana, Ibiza, Istanbul, Johannesburg–O.R. Tambo, Lanzarote, Lima, Lisbon, London–Gatwick, Málaga, Marrakesh, Medellín–JMC, Miami, Milan–Malpensa, Montevideo, Munich, New York–JFK, Palma de Mallorca, Panama City–Tocumen, Paris–Orly, Porto, Punta Cana, Quito, Rome–Fiumicino, Salvador da Bahia, San Pedro Sula, San Salvador (begins 17 December 2026), Santa Cruz de la Sierra–Viru Viru, Santiago de los Caballeros, Santo Domingo–Las Américas, São Paulo–Guarulhos, Seville, Tel Aviv, Tenerife–North, Tunis, Valencia, Venice, Vigo, Zürich; Seasonal: Athens, Tangier
Air France	Paris–Charles de Gaulle
Air Serbia	Belgrade
Air Transat	Montréal–Trudeau
airBaltic	Riga
AJet	Ankara
American Airlines	Charlotte, Dallas/Fort Worth, Miami, New York–JFK, Philadelphia; Seasonal: Chicago–O'Hare
Avianca	Bogotá, Cali, Medellín–JMC
Avianca El Salvador	San Salvador
Azul Brazilian Airlines	Campinas, Recife
Beijing Capital Airlines	Hangzhou
Binter Canarias	Gran Canaria Tenerife–North
Boliviana de Aviación	Cochabamba, Santa Cruz de la Sierra–Viru Viru
British Airways	London–Heathrow; Seasonal: London–City
Brussels Airlines	Brussels
Bulgaria Air	Sofia
Cathay Pacific	Hong Kong
China Eastern Airlines	Shanghai–Pudong, Wenzhou
China Southern Airlines	Guangzhou
Croatia Airlines	Zagreb
Dan Air	Seasonal: Bacău
Delta Air Lines	Atlanta, New York–JFK; Seasonal: Boston
easyJet	Basel/Mulhouse, Bristol, Edinburgh, Geneva, Lisbon, London–Gatwick, London–Luton, Lyon, Manchester, Nantes, Nice
Egyptair	Cairo, Luxor
El Al	Tel Aviv
Emirates	Dubai–International
Ethiopian Airlines	Addis Ababa, Porto
Etihad Airways	Abu Dhabi
Eurowings	Düsseldorf, Stuttgart (begins 29 March 2027)
Hainan Airlines	Chongqing, Haikou, Shenzhen
Iberia	A Coruña, Algiers, Alicante, Almería, Amsterdam, Andorra/La Seu d'Urgell, Asturias, Athens, Badajoz, Barcelona, Berlin, Bilbao, Bogotá, Bologna, Bordeaux, Boston, Brussels, Budapest, Buenos Aires–Ezeiza, Caracas, Casablanca, Castellón, Chicago–O'Hare, Dakar–Diass, Dallas/Fort Worth, Doha (resumes 28 March 2027), Düsseldorf, Faro, Florence, Fortaleza, Frankfurt, Funchal, Geneva, Granada, Guatemala City, Guayaquil, Hamburg, Helsinki, Ibiza, Jerez de la Frontera, Lima, Lisbon, Logroño, London–Gatwick, London–Heathrow, Los Angeles, Lyon, Málaga, Marseille, Melilla, Menorca, Mexico City–Benito Juárez, Miami, Milan–Linate, Milan–Malpensa, Monterrey, Montevideo, Munich, Nantes, New York–JFK, Nice, Orlando, Oslo, Palma de Mallorca, Pamplona, Panama City–Tocumen, Paris–Charles de Gaulle, Paris–Orly, Porto, Prague, Quito, Recife, Rio de Janeiro–Galeão, Rome–Fiumicino, San José (CR), San Juan, San Sebastián, Santander, Santiago de Chile, Santiago de Compostela, Santo Domingo–Las Américas, São Paulo–Guarulhos, Seville, Stockholm–Arlanda, Strasbourg, Tangier, Tokyo–Narita, Toulouse, Turin, Valencia, Venice, Vienna, Vigo, Washington–Dulles, Zagreb, Zürich; Seasonal: Bucharest–Otopeni, Cagliari, Catania, Corfu, Dubrovnik, Innsbruck, Ljubljana, Mykonos, Nador, Newark, Olbia, Palermo, Ponta Delgada, Rovaniemi, San Francisco, Santorini, Split, Tirana, Tivat, Toronto–Pearson, Tromsø
Iberia Express	Bari, Cairo, Copenhagen, Dublin, Fuerteventura, Gran Canaria, Ibiza, La Palma, Lanzarote, London–Gatwick, Lyon, Málaga, Manchester, Marrakesh, Naples, Nice, Palma de Mallorca, Tel Aviv, Tenerife–North; Seasonal: Edinburgh, Menorca, Reykjavik–Keflavík
Iberojet	Bangkok–Suvarnabhumi, Cancún, Punta Cana, Querétaro, San José (CR), San Salvador, Tegucigalpa/Comayagua
Israir	Tel Aviv
ITA Airways	Rome–Fiumicino
JetBlue	Seasonal: Boston
KLM	Amsterdam
KM Malta Airlines	Malta
Korean Air	Seoul–Incheon
Kuwait Airways	Kuwait City
LASER Airlines	Caracas
LATAM Brasil	São Paulo–Guarulhos
LATAM Chile	Santiago de Chile
LATAM Perú	Lima
LOT Polish Airlines	Kraków, Warsaw–Chopin
Lufthansa	Frankfurt, Munich
Luxair	Luxembourg
MEA	Beirut
Norwegian Air Shuttle	Seasonal: Copenhagen, Oslo
Pegasus Airlines	Istanbul–Sabiha Gökçen, Izmir
Plus Ultra Líneas Aéreas	Caracas
Qatar Airways	Doha
Riyadh Air	Riyadh
Royal Air Maroc	Casablanca, Rabat, Tétouan; Seasonal: Nador, Tangier
Royal Jordanian	Amman–Queen Alia
Ryanair	Amman–Queen Alia, Bari, Berlin, Birmingham, Bologna, Bristol, Brussels, Brussels Charleroi,Bucharest–Otopeni, Budapest, Catania, Copenhagen, Dakhla, Dublin, Edinburgh, Eindhoven, Essaouira, Fès, Gdańsk, Gran Canaria, Ibiza, Kraków, Lanzarote, Liverpool, London–Stansted, Luxembourg, Malta, Manchester, Marrakech, Marseille, Menorca, Milan Bergamo, Milan–Malpensa, Nador, Naples, Paris Beauvais, Palermo, Palma de Mallorca, Pisa, Porto, Prague, Rabat, Rome–Fiumicino, Shannon, Sofia, Tangier, Tirana, Turin, Venice Treviso, Verona, Vienna, Warsaw–Modlin, Wrocław; Seasonal: Agadir, Alghero, Bordeaux, Brindisi, Cagliari, Faro, Kaunas, Lamezia Terme, Tétouan, Venice
Saudia	Jeddah
Scandinavian Airlines	Copenhagen, Stockholm–Arlanda
Sichuan Airlines	Chengdu–Tianfu
Singapore Airlines	Singapore
Sky Express	Athens
SkyUp Airlines	Chișinău
Smartwings	Prague
SunExpress	Seasonal: İzmir
Swiss International Air Lines	Zürich
TAP Air Portugal	Lisbon
Transavia	Montpellier, Paris–Orly
Turkish Airlines	Istanbul
United Airlines	Newark, Washington–Dulles
Uzbekistan Airways	Tashkent, Urgench
Volotea	A Coruña (begins 27 November 2026), Asturias, Barcelona (begins 27 November 2026), Córdoba (begins 4 December 2026), Genoa, Granada (begins 27 November 2026), Málaga, Nantes, Santander, Seville; Seasonal: Ancona, Bordeaux, Lyon, Montpellier, Olbia, Toulouse
Vueling	Barcelona, Florence
Wizz Air	Almería (begins 14 December 2026), Asturias, Belgrade (ends 8 January 2027), Brașov (begins 18 December 2026), Bucharest–Otopeni, Budapest, Cluj-Napoca, Craiova, Gdańsk, Iași, Jerez de la Frontera (begins 14 December 2026), Katowice, Kutaisi, Larnaca, London–Luton, Málaga, Milan–Malpensa, Naples (begins 14 December 2026), Palma de Mallorca, Pisa, Rome–Fiumicino, Santiago de Compostela, Seville, Sibiu, Skopje, Sofia, Timișoara, Tirana, Turin, Venice, Warsaw–Chopin, Wrocław
World2Fly	Cali, Cartagena, Cancún, Punta Cana, Rosario, Santo Domingo Las Americas, Zanzibar; Seasonal: La Romana, Mauritius; Seasonal charter: Athens, Malabo, Paris–Charles de Gaulle, Tashkent, Urgench

=== Cargo ===
Airlines	Destinations
Air Canada Cargo	Toronto–Pearson
Air China Cargo	Hangzhou, Shanghai–Pudong
Cygnus Air	Gran Canaria, Tenerife–North
Emirates SkyCargo	Dubai–Al Maktoum
Ethiopian Cargo	Macau
FedEx Express	Paris–Charles de Gaulle
My Freighter	Tashkent
Swiftair	Casablanca, Gran Canaria, Palma de Mallorca, Tenerife–North

== Statistics ==
=== Passenger numbers ===
Year	Passengers	Aircraft movements	Cargo (tonnes)
2001	34,050,215	375,558	295,944
2002	33,915,302	368,029	295,711
2003	35,855,861	383,804	307,026
2004	38,718,614	401,503	341,177
2005	42,146,784	415,704	333,138
2006	45,799,983	434,959	325,702
2007	52,110,787	483,292	325,201
2008	50,846,494	469,746	329,187
2009	48,437,147	435,187	302,863
2010	49,863,504	433,683	373,380
2011	49,671,270	429,390	394,154
2012	45,195,014	373,185	359,362
2013	39,735,618	333,056	346,602
2014	41,833,374	342,601	366,645
2015	46,828,279	366,605	381,069
2016	50,420,583	378,150	415,774
2017	53,402,506	387,566	470,795
2018	57,891,340	409,832	518,858
2019	61,734,037	426,376	558,567
2020	17,112,389	165,740	401,133
2021	24,135,220	217,537	523,395
2022	50,633,652	351,906	566,372
2023	60,220,984	389,179	643,534
2024	66,196,984	420,182	766,818
2025	68,179,054	430,616	840,331
Source: Aena Statistics

=== Busiest routes ===
Busiest European routes (2025)
Rank	Destination	Passengers	Change 2024/25
1	Rome-Fiumicino	1,983,984	▲0,13%
2	Lisbon	1,852,887	▼2,84%
3	Paris-Orly	1,721,951	▲8,6%
4	London-Heathrow	1,500,925	▼3,19%
5	Amsterdam	1,330,096	▲8,2%
6	Brussels	1,032,654	▲1,8%
7	Milan-Malpensa	988,752	▲3,2%
8	Paris-Charles de Gaulle	985,089	▼7,0%
9	Porto	977,524	▼6,2%
10	Frankfurt	923,854	▲1,5%
Source: Estadísticas de tráfico aereo

Busiest intercontinental routes (2025)
Rank	Destination	Passengers	Change 2024/25
1	Bogotá	1,658,541	▲3,0%
2	Buenos Aires-Ezeiza	1,168,847	▲8,4%
3	Mexico City	1,157,051	▲0,1%
4	Lima	1,033,685	▲4,9%
5	São Paulo-Guarulhos	1.018.970	▲18,6%
6	New York-JFK	834,440	▼0,6%
7	Miami	767,356	▼2,6%
8	Doha	680,698	▲10,3%
9	Santiago de Chile	673,434	▲2,9%
10	Santo Domingo	527,931	▲4,3%
Source: Estadísticas de tráfico aereo

Busiest domestic routes (2025)
Rank	Destination	Passengers	Change 2024/25
1	Palma de Mallorca	2,222,189	▲0,7%
2	Gran Canaria	1,911,302	▼3,1%
3	Tenerife-North	1,790,897	▲0,1%
4	Barcelona	1,768,381	▼13,1%
5	Ibiza	935,121	▼2,7%
6	Bilbao	829,142	▲2,6%
7	A Coruña	803,620	▲3,3%
8	Vigo	731,757	▲6,5%
9	Málaga	652,841	▼6,4%
10	Lanzarote	646,433	▲0,1%
Source: Estadísticas de tráfico aereo

== Medical care ==
The airport is attached to the Ramón y Cajal University Hospital in Madrid as a referral hospital for medical and surgical emergencies requiring hospital care.

In addition, the airport itself has medical rooms and medical personnel attached to the Airport Medical Service to cover transit passengers who need medical attention. It also has 75 Cardiac Rescue Points equipped with defibrillators in the event of cardiorespiratory arrest.

== Ground transport ==
=== Taxi ===
All terminals have clearly signed taxi ranks outside the arrivals area. Official taxis are white with a red stripe and have the Madrid City Council coat-of-arms on their doors.

=== Ride-hailing ===
Since 2024, the Estonian ride-hailing company Bolt has operated exclusive pickup areas at the airport, offering flat-rate fares for rides into the city.

=== Rail ===
Line 8 (Madrid Metro) of the Madrid Metro connects the airport with Nuevos Ministerios Station in Madrid's financial district. There are underground stations at Terminal 2 (access to T1 and T3) and Terminal 4. The metro also provides links to stations on the Spanish railway network.

In October 2006, a bid was launched for the construction of a Cercanías link between Chamartín Station and Terminal 4. Now finished, this single Cercanías Line (C-1) links Madrid Barajas Terminal 4, with Chamartín Station and Atocha AVE high-speed train stations. In June 2011 a decision was made to equip this link with dual gauge which will allow AVE high-speed trains to reach the airport station.

The Nuevos Ministerios metro station opened a satellite check-in center in 2002 right by the AZCA business area in central Madrid; the satellite check-in center was permanently closed in 2006 due to security concerns.

=== Metropolitan bus ===
EMT (Madrid Municipal Transport Company) runs regular public bus services between the airport and Madrid (Avenida de América station): bus 200 runs as a complete line – dropping passengers at departures of terminals 1, 2 and 4 before collecting passengers in the reverse order at arrivals. The EMT public night bus service N4 (nicknamed "Buho", Owl) also offers services from Madrid downtown (Plaza Cibeles) to Barajas (Plaza de los Hermanos Falcó y Alvarez de Toledo, 400m from the airport through a passageway above the highway). EMT also have an express bus linking Barajas airport to Renfe's Atocha Station, the main rail station in Madrid, during day and Plaza Cibeles during night. Unlike the two services mentioned above, this line runs 24 hours of the day during all the days of the year.

CRTM (Consorcio Regional de Transportes de Madrid) runs four bus services between the airport and nearby cities in the metropolitan area:

- 822: T1 – Coslada – San Fernando de Henares
- 824: T2 – Torrejón de Ardoz – Alcalá de Henares
- 827: Canillejas – T4 – Alcobendas – Universidad Autónoma de Madrid – Tres Cantos
- 828: Canillejas – T4 – Alcobendas – Universidad Autónoma de Madrid

=== Long distance coaches ===
From terminals T1 and T4, the bus company Avanzabus operates routes to Ávila, Castellón de la Plana, Salamanca, Valencia and Province of Zamora. From terminal T4, the Alsa bus company runs services to the cities of Zaragoza, Barcelona, Valladolid, León, Murcia, Alicante, Gijón, Oviedo, Lugo, A Coruña, Santiago de Compostela, Burgos, Vitoria-Gasteiz, San Sebastián, Santander, Bilbao, Logroño and Pamplona. From terminal T1 the Socibus company runs services to the major cities in Andalusia: Huelva, Córdoba, Cádiz, Jerez de la Frontera and Seville.

Madrid Barajas Airport People Mover
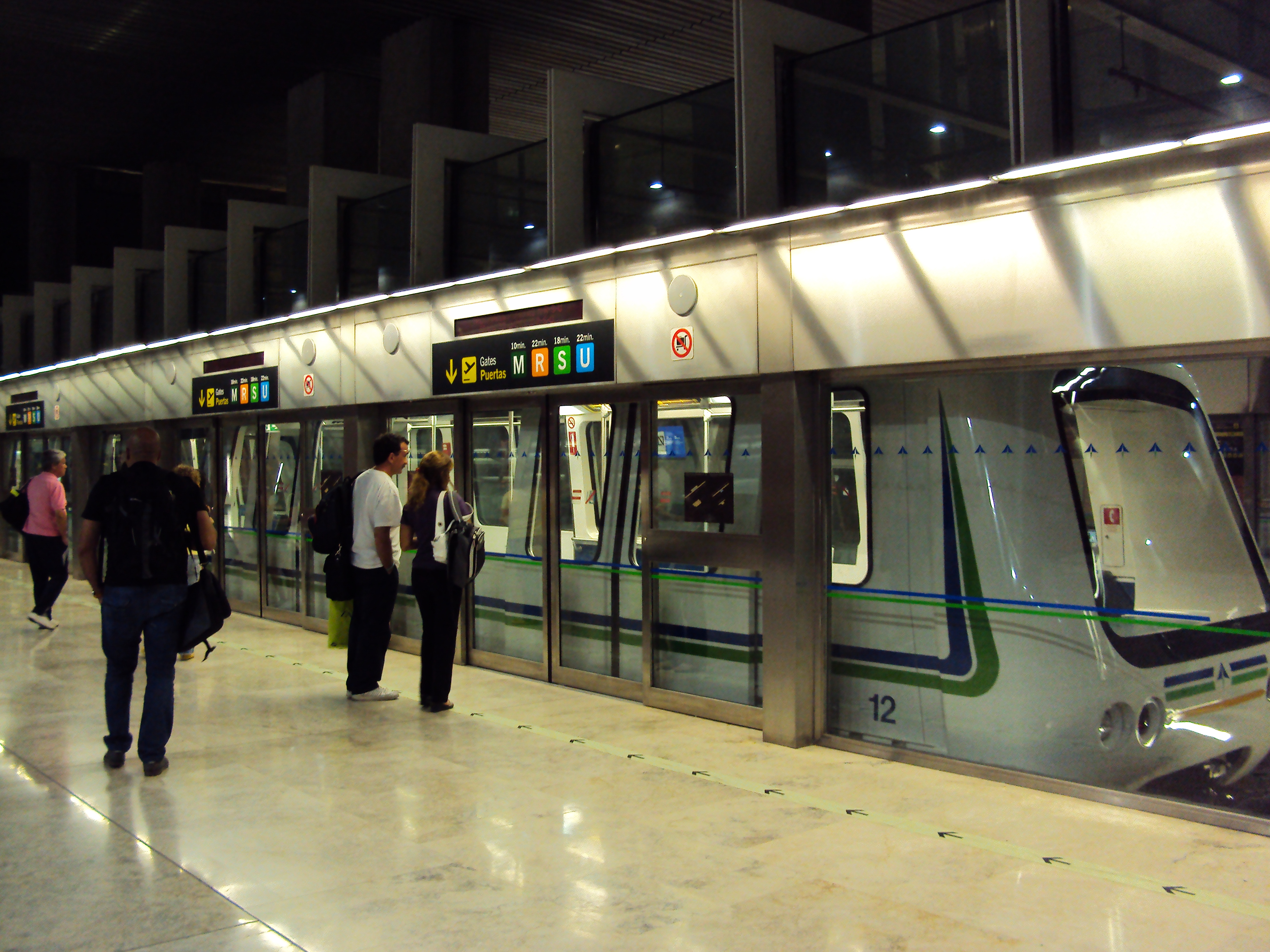

Overview
- Status: Operational
- Locale: Adolfo Suárez Madrid–Barajas Airport
- Termini: Terminal T4; Satellite T4S
- Stations: 2

Service
- Type: People mover
- Services: 1
- Operator: Bombardier Transportation
- Rolling stock: 19 Bombardier Innovia APM 100 vehicles
- Daily ridership: 27.400 (2012)

History
- Opened: 4 February 2006

Technical
- Line length: 2.7 km (1.7 miles)
- Num of tracks: 2
- Character: Underground
- Electrification: Two centre rails
- Operating speed: 37 mph (60 km/h)

=== Airport people mover ===
In early 2006, the first driverless transit system in Spain and the longest airport people mover system in Europe began transporting passengers between the new terminal (T4) and a new satellite terminal (T4S). Deploying the CITYFLO 550 automatic train control technology, the system is the only mode of transportation for passengers between the two terminals, which are spaced two kilometres apart. Bombardier became the only contractor for the completely underground shuttle system, including the construction of the civil works, operation and maintenance of the system.

The route is 2 kilometres (1.2 mi) in length and can carry up to 13,000 passengers per hour.

=== Airport parking ===
Long- and short-term car parking is provided at the airport with seven public parking areas. P1 is an outdoor car park located in front of the terminal building; P2 is an indoor car park with direct access to terminals T2 and T3. A Parking 'Express' facility, available for short periods only, is located at Terminal 2 and dedicated long-term parking is also available with 1,655 spaces; a free shuttle operates between the long-stay car park and all terminals. There are also VIP car parks.

== Incidents and accidents ==
- On 4 January 1951, a Lockheed Model 18 Lodestar of Ejército del Aire crashed when an engine failed after takeoff. It was on a delivery flight to the Spanish Air Force. Both occupants were killed.
- On 30 September 1972, a Douglas C-47B EC-AQE of Spantax crashed on takeoff. The aircraft was being used for training duties and the student pilot over-rotated and stalled. One of the six people on board was killed.
- On 9 May 1976, a Boeing 747 of the Imperial Iranian Air Force was struck by lightning while on approach. This caused the left wing's fuel tank to explode and the wing itself to separate, resulting in the aircraft to crash and killing all 17 passengers and crew.
- On 27 November 1983, Avianca Flight 011 crashed while attempting to land. Flight 011 struck a series of hills, causing the plane's right wing to break off. The 747 then cartwheeled, shattering into five pieces before coming to rest upside-down. Only 11 of the 169 passengers survived – there were no survivors among the 23 crew.
- On 20 August 2008, Spanair Flight 5022 which was travelling to Gran Canaria, veered off to the right and into the ground while climbing immediately after lifting off from runway 36L at 14:45 local time. The McDonnell Douglas MD-82 with registration "EC-HFP", was carrying 172 people, including 162 passengers. In the accident, 154 people were killed, two were seriously injured and 12 were slightly injured. Prime Minister Zapatero ordered three days of national mourning.
