= Aeropuerto T4 (Madrid Metro) =

Madrid Metro station

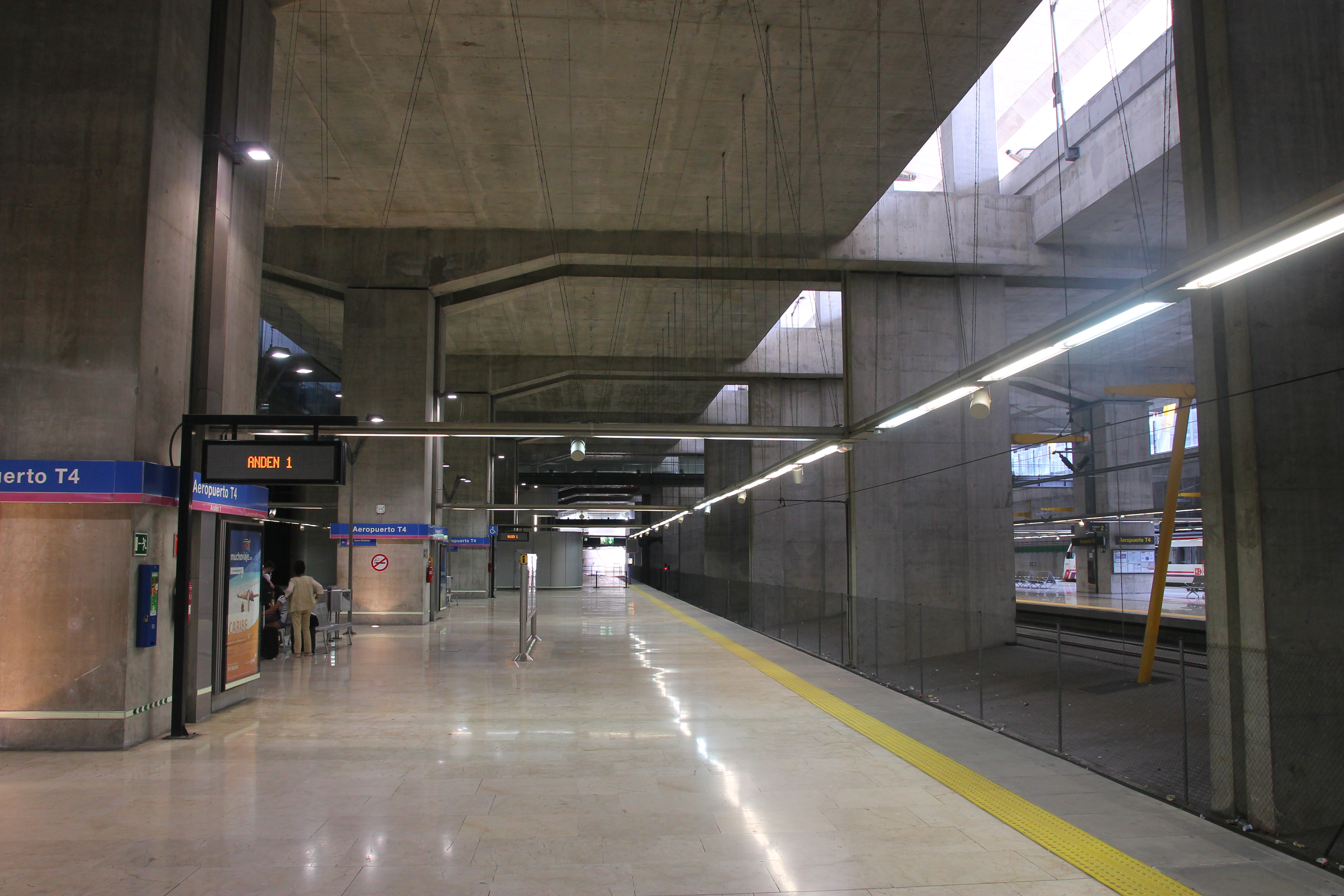

General information
- Location: Barajas, Madrid; Spain
- Coordinates: 40.4917613°N 3.5935537°W
- System: Madrid Metro station
- Owner: CRTM
- Operator: CRTM

Construction
- Accessible: yes

Other information
- Fare zone: A

History
- Opened: 3 May 2007; 19 years ago (metro); 22 September 2011; 14 years ago (Cercanías)

Services
Preceding station	Madrid Metro	Following station
Barajas towards Nuevos Ministerios	Line 8	Terminus
Preceding station	Cercanías Madrid	Following station
Valdebebas towards Príncipe Pío	C-1	Terminus
Location
- Location within Madrid

Aeropuerto T4 ([aeɾoˈpweɾto te ˈkwatɾo], "Airport Terminal 4") is a station on Line 8 of Madrid Metro and Lines C-1 of Cercanías Madrid on the lower level of the new terminal T4 of Madrid-Barajas Airport. The metro station was opened on 3 May 2007 and the commuter rail station was opened on 22 September 2011; and presents the particularity of requiring the payment of a special supplement of €1 for users of single ticket or Metrobus, the same way it happens in the station Airport T1-T2-T3. It is located in fare Zone A.

The Cercanías Madrid station runs in parallel to the Metro and can be seen from one platform to the other.

The station was built along with the civil works of the airport terminal and a train station.
