= Barajas (Madrid) =

- District
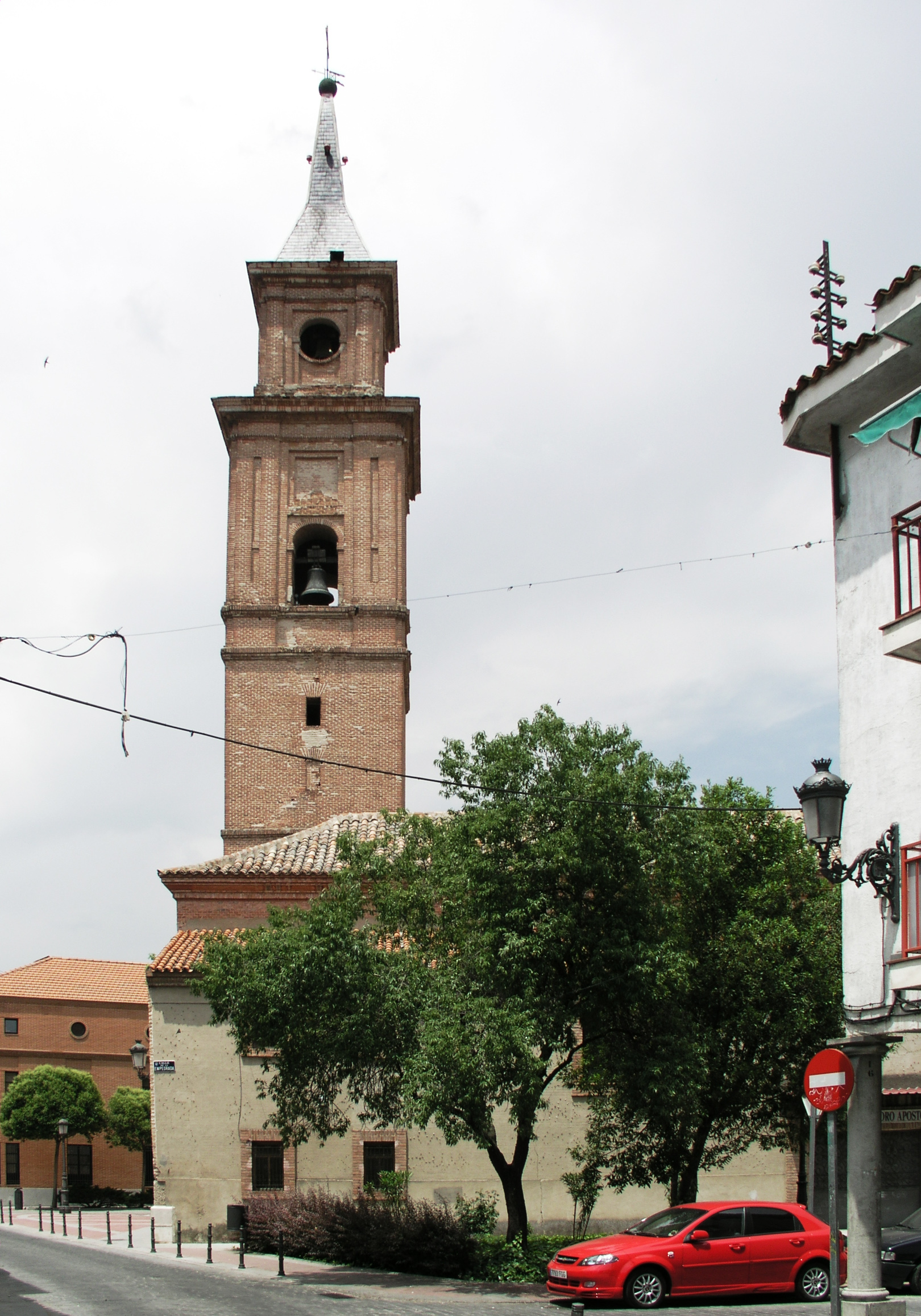
- San Pedro Church
- Interactive map of Barajas
- Country: Spain
- Aut. community: Madrid
- Municipality: Madrid

Government
  - Councillor-President: Juan Peña Ochoa (PP, 2023)

Area
  - Total: 42.66 km^{2} (16.47 sq mi)

Population
  - Total: 43,423
  - Density: 1,017/km^{2} (2,630/sq mi)
- Postal code: 28032
- Madrid district number: 21

Barajas [baˈɾa.xas] is a district of the city of Madrid, Spain.

Madrid's main international airport, Adolfo Suárez Madrid–Barajas Airport, is located in the district.

== History ==
=== Origins ===
This district was originated from the "Villa de Barajas" municipality, until it was integrated into the municipality of Madrid in 1949 at the same time as Hortaleza, Canillas, Canillejas, Vallecas, Vicálvaro, Carabanchel Alto, Carabanchel Bajo, Aravaca, El Pardo and Fuencarral. The municipality of Barajas stretched through the neighborhood today known as the Historic Center of Barajas, east of the current Avenida de Logroño.

== Geography ==
=== Subdivision ===
The district is administratively divided into five wards (barrios):

- Aeropuerto
- Alameda de Osuna (where the Parque de El Capricho is located)
- Casco Histórico de Barajas
- Corralejos
- Timón
