= Condylostylus flavipes =

Scientific classification
- Domain: Eukaryota
- Kingdom: Animalia
- Phylum: Arthropoda
- Class: Insecta
- Order: Diptera
- Family: Dolichopodidae
- Subfamily: Sciapodinae
- Tribe: Sciapodini
- Genus: Condylostylus
- Species: C. flavipes

Binomial name
- Condylostylus flavipes (Aldrich, 1904)

Synonyms
- Psilopodinus flavipes Aldrich, 1904

Species of fly

Condylostylus flavipes is a species in the family Dolichopodidae ("longlegged flies"), in the order Diptera ("flies").
