= Condylostylus inornatus =

Scientific classification
- Domain: Eukaryota
- Kingdom: Animalia
- Phylum: Arthropoda
- Class: Insecta
- Order: Diptera
- Family: Dolichopodidae
- Subfamily: Sciapodinae
- Tribe: Sciapodini
- Genus: Condylostylus
- Species: C. inornatus

Binomial name
- Condylostylus inornatus (Aldrich, 1901)

Synonyms
- Psilopus inornatus Aldrich, 1901

Species of fly

Condylostylus inornatus is a species of long-legged fly in the family Dolichopodidae.
