= Condylostylus nigrofemoratus =

Scientific classification
- Kingdom: Animalia
- Phylum: Arthropoda
- Class: Insecta
- Order: Diptera
- Family: Dolichopodidae
- Subfamily: Sciapodinae
- Tribe: Sciapodini
- Genus: Condylostylus
- Species: C. nigrofemoratus

Binomial name
- Condylostylus nigrofemoratus (Walker, 1849)

Synonyms
- Psilopus cockerelli Van Duzee, 1927; Psilopus nigrofemoratus Walker, 1849; Psilopus scobinator Loew, 1861

Species of fly

Condylostylus nigrofemoratus is a species of longlegged fly in the family Dolichopodidae.
