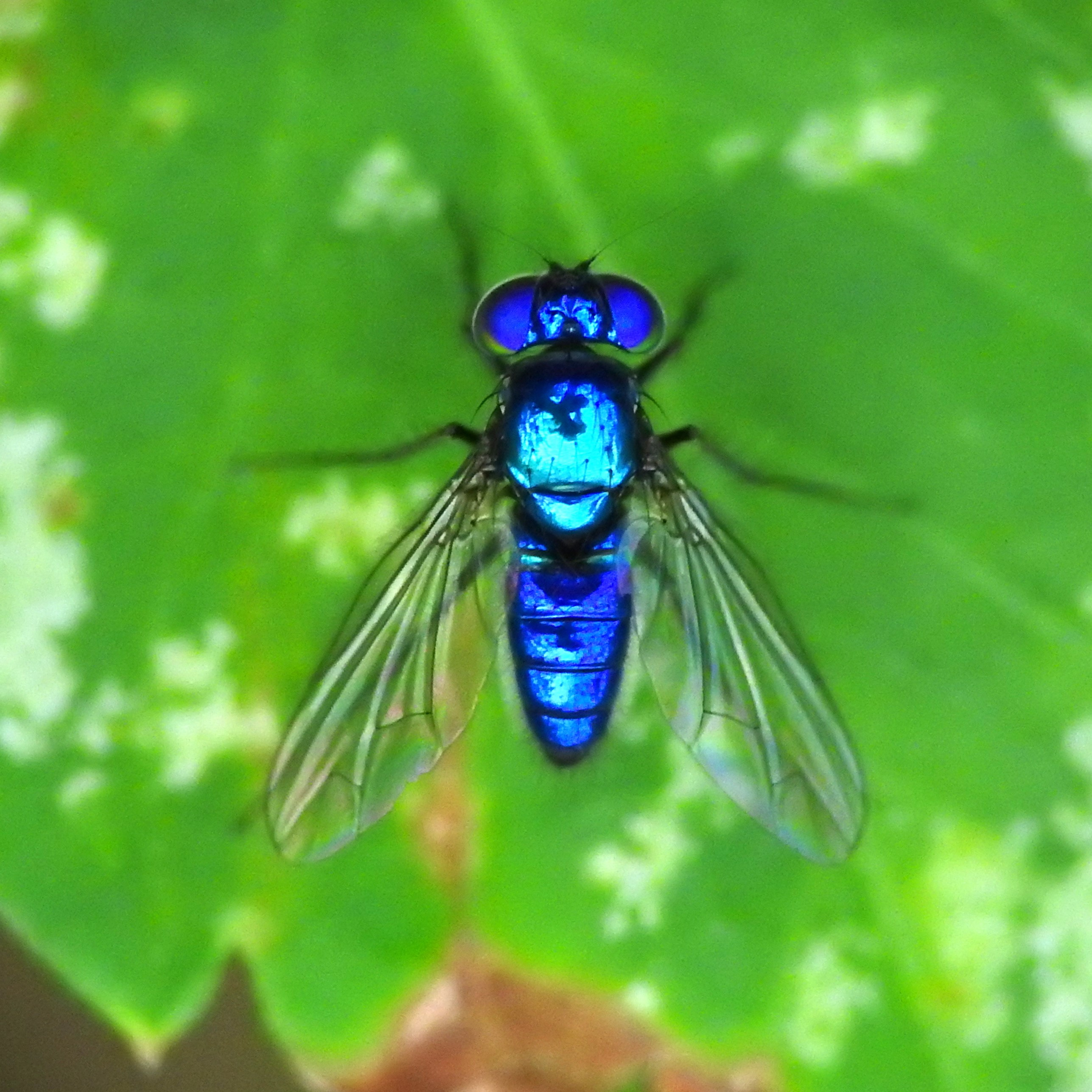

Scientific classification
- Kingdom: Animalia
- Phylum: Arthropoda
- Class: Insecta
- Order: Diptera
- Family: Dolichopodidae
- Subfamily: Sciapodinae
- Tribe: Sciapodini
- Genus: Condylostylus
- Species: C. mundus

Binomial name
- Condylostylus mundus (Wiedemann, 1830)

Synonyms
- Psilopus ciliatus Loew, 1861; Psilopus mundus Wiedemann, 1830; Psilopus peractus Walker, 1860

= Condylostylus mundus =

Species of fly

Condylostylus mundus is a species of long-legged fly in the family Dolichopodidae.

== Gallery ==
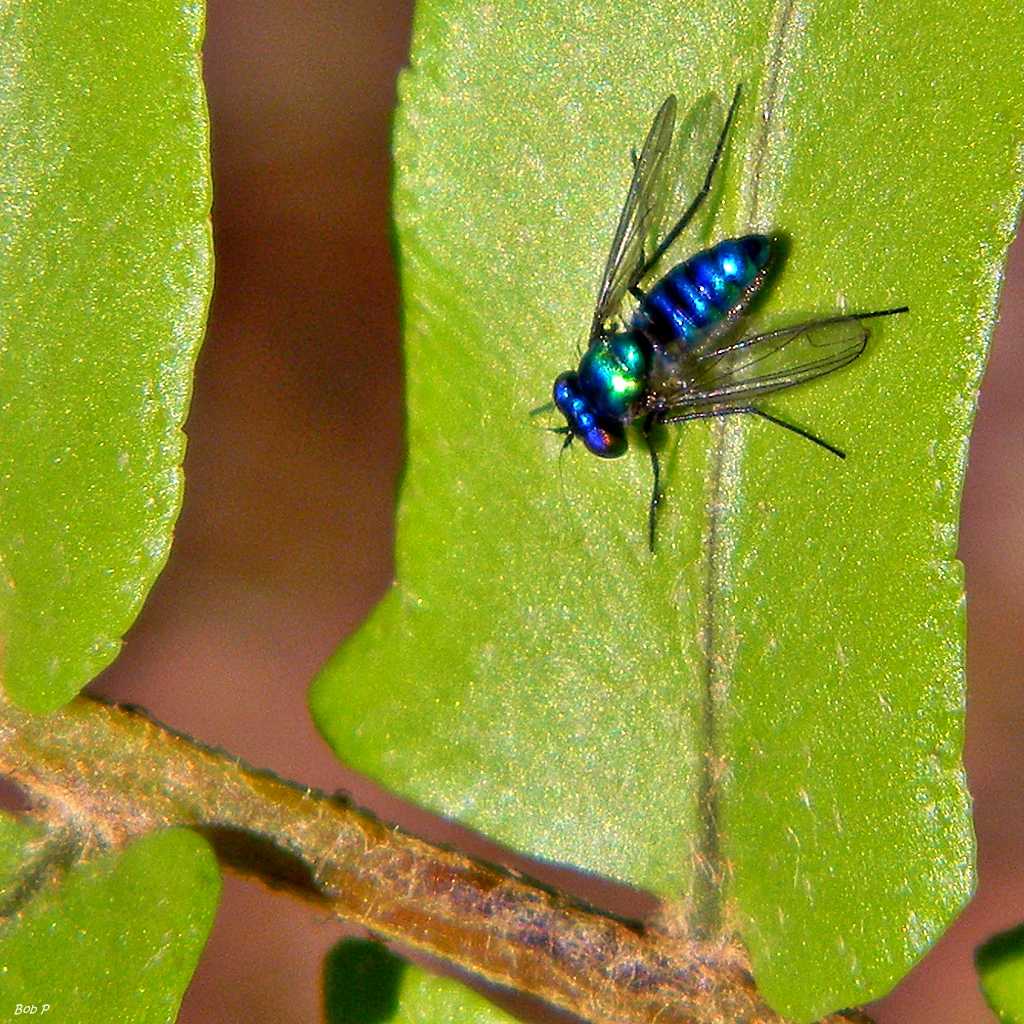
