= Condylostylus calcaratus =

Scientific classification
- Kingdom: Animalia
- Phylum: Arthropoda
- Class: Insecta
- Order: Diptera
- Family: Dolichopodidae
- Subfamily: Sciapodinae
- Tribe: Sciapodini
- Genus: Condylostylus
- Species: C. calcaratus

Binomial name
- Condylostylus calcaratus (Loew, 1861)

Synonyms
- Psilopus calcaratus Loew, 1861

Species of fly

Condylostylus calcaratus is a species of long-legged fly in the family Dolichopodidae.
