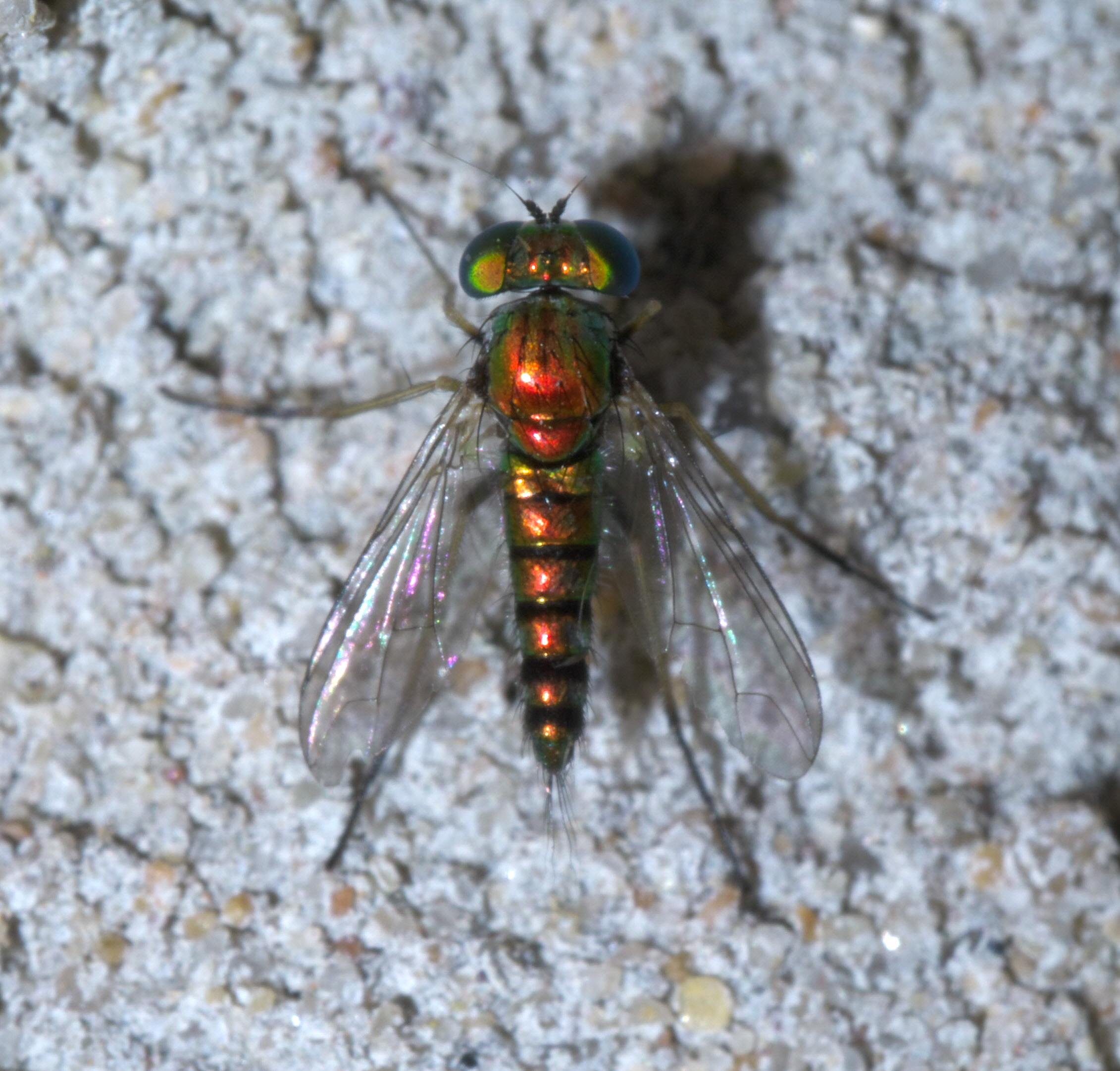

Scientific classification
- Domain: Eukaryota
- Kingdom: Animalia
- Phylum: Arthropoda
- Class: Insecta
- Order: Diptera
- Family: Dolichopodidae
- Subfamily: Sciapodinae
- Tribe: Sciapodini
- Genus: Condylostylus
- Species: C. caudatus

Binomial name
- Condylostylus caudatus (Wiedemann, 1830)

Synonyms
- Condylostylus quintusflavus Gunther, 1980; Psilopus caudatulus Loew, 1861; Psilopus caudatus Wiedemann, 1830; Psilopus virgo Wiedemann, 1830

= Condylostylus caudatus =

Species of fly

Condylostylus caudatus is a species of long-legged fly in the family Dolichopodidae.

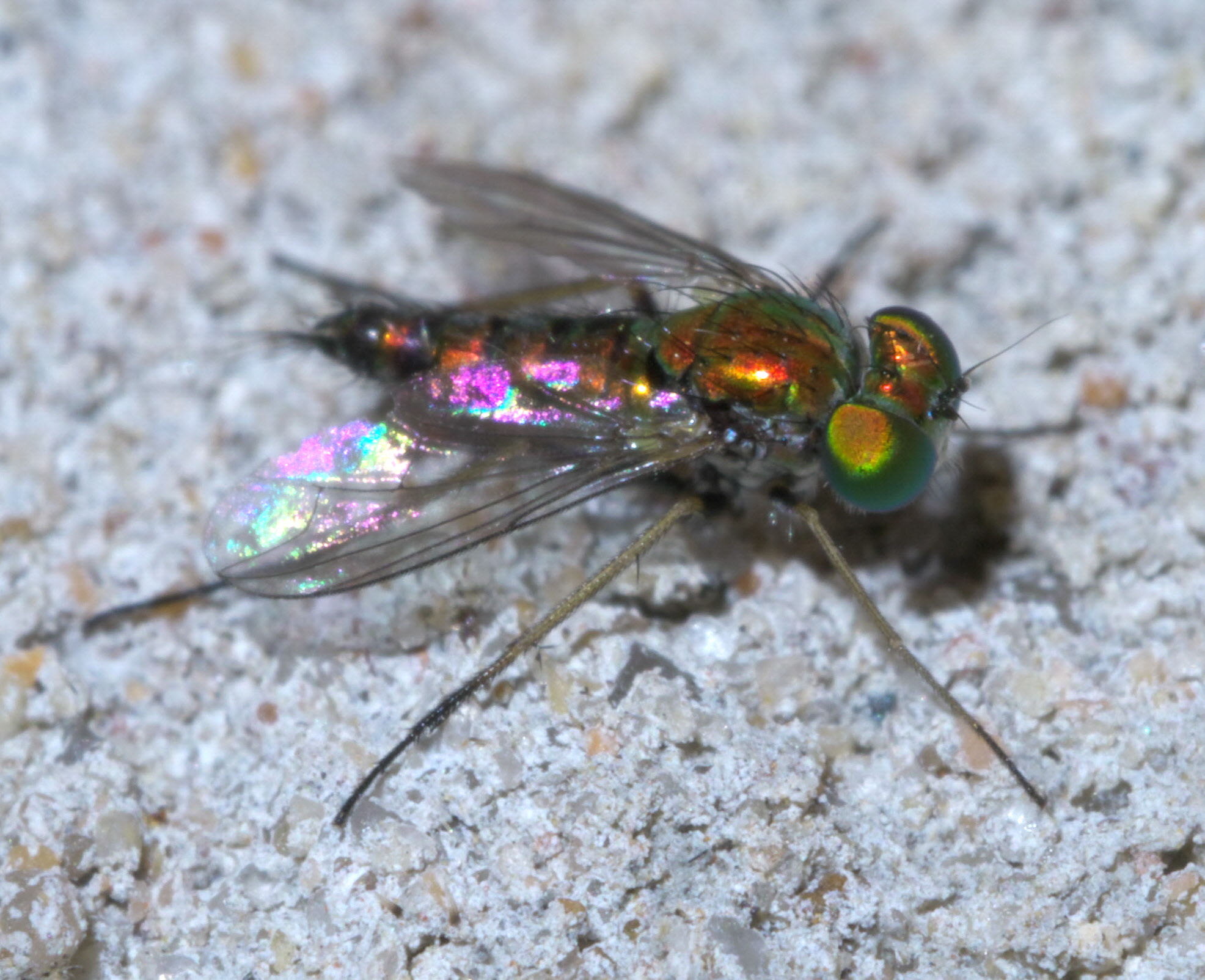
