= Condylostylus viridicoxa =

Scientific classification
- Domain: Eukaryota
- Kingdom: Animalia
- Phylum: Arthropoda
- Class: Insecta
- Order: Diptera
- Family: Dolichopodidae
- Subfamily: Sciapodinae
- Tribe: Sciapodini
- Genus: Condylostylus
- Species: C. viridicoxa

Binomial name
- Condylostylus viridicoxa (Aldrich, 1904)

Synonyms
- Psilopodinus viridicoxa Aldrich, 1904

Species of fly

Condylostylus viridicoxa is a species of long-legged fly in the family Dolichopodidae.
