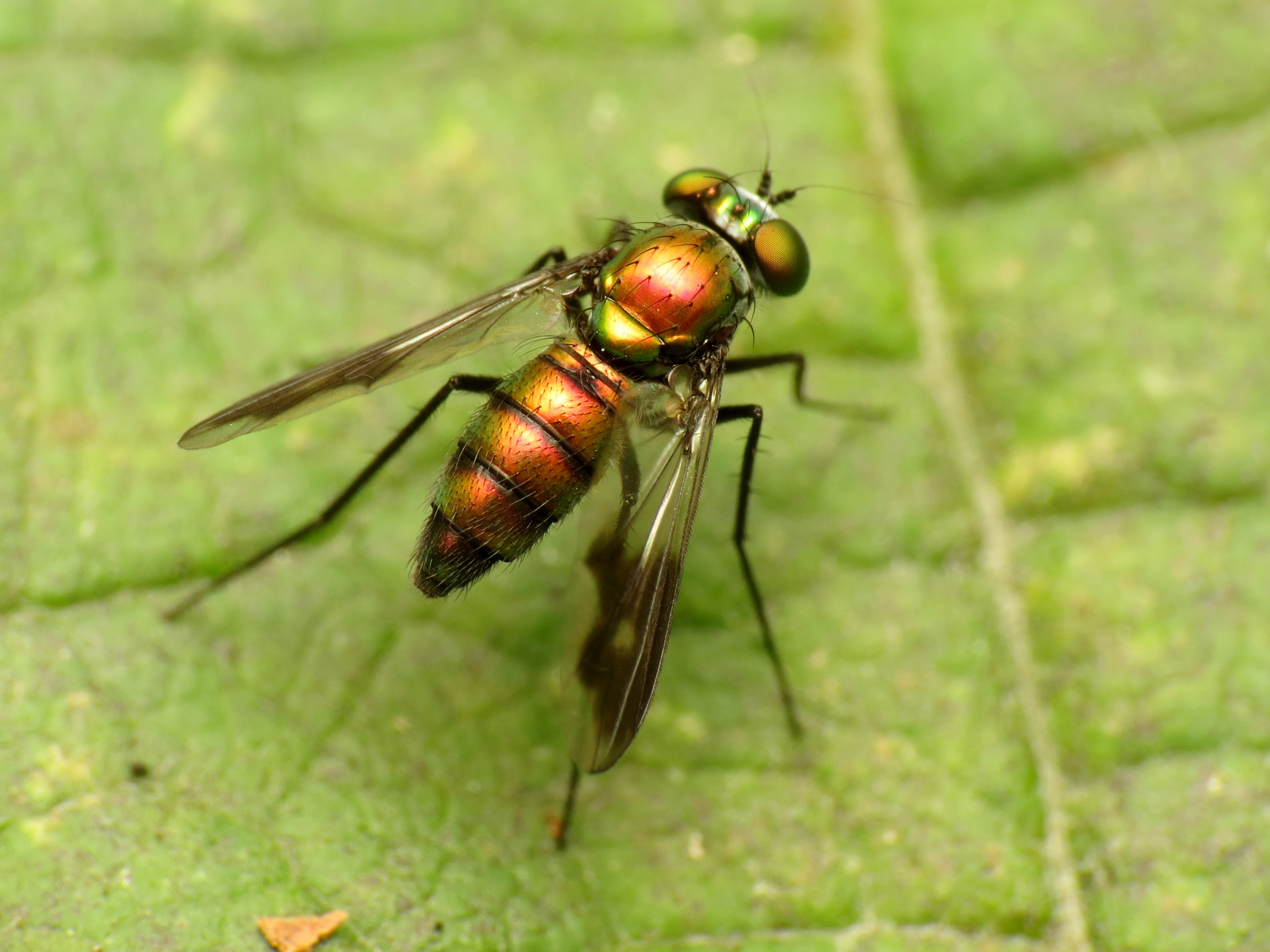

Scientific classification
- Kingdom: Animalia
- Phylum: Arthropoda
- Class: Insecta
- Order: Diptera
- Family: Dolichopodidae
- Subfamily: Sciapodinae
- Tribe: Sciapodini
- Genus: Condylostylus
- Species: C. patibulatus

Binomial name
- Condylostylus patibulatus (Say, 1823)

Synonyms
- Dolichopus patibulatus Say, 1823; Psilopodinus carolinensis Bigot, 1888; Psilopus amatus Walker, 1849

= Condylostylus patibulatus =

Species of fly

Condylostylus patibulatus is a species of long-legged fly in the family Dolichopodidae.
