= Condylostylus melampus =

Scientific classification
- Domain: Eukaryota
- Kingdom: Animalia
- Phylum: Arthropoda
- Class: Insecta
- Order: Diptera
- Family: Dolichopodidae
- Subfamily: Sciapodinae
- Tribe: Sciapodini
- Genus: Condylostylus
- Species: C. melampus

Binomial name
- Condylostylus melampus (Loew, 1862)

Synonyms
- Condylostylus currani Parent, 1929; Psilopus melampus Loew, 1862

Species of fly

Condylostylus melampus is a species of long-legged fly in the family Dolichopodidae.
