= Condylostylus coloradensis =

Scientific classification
- Domain: Eukaryota
- Kingdom: Animalia
- Phylum: Arthropoda
- Class: Insecta
- Order: Diptera
- Family: Dolichopodidae
- Subfamily: Sciapodinae
- Tribe: Sciapodini
- Genus: Condylostylus
- Species: C. coloradensis

Binomial name
- Condylostylus coloradensis Van Duzee, 1932

Species of fly

Condylostylus coloradensis is a species of long-legged fly in the family Dolichopodidae.
