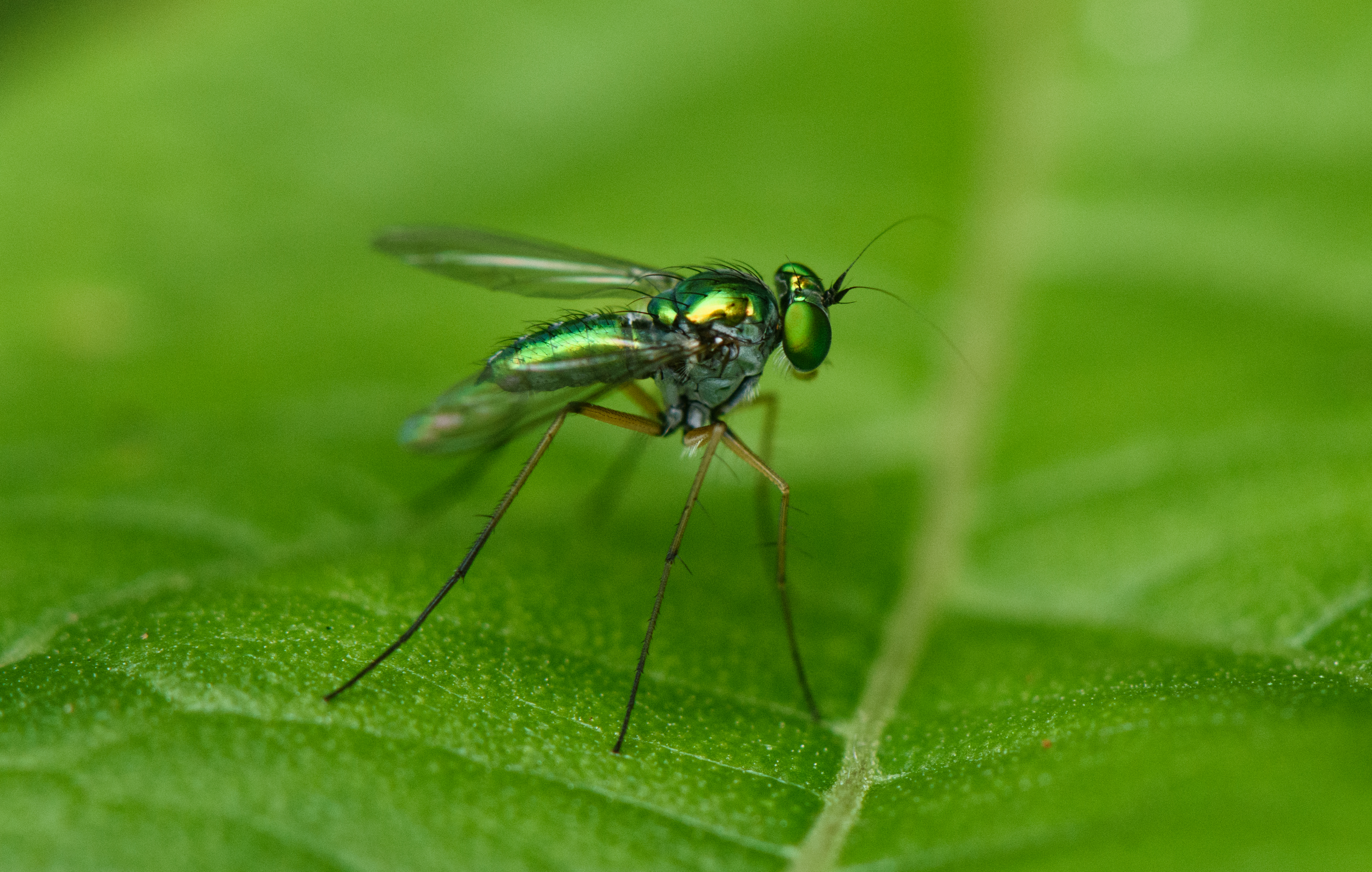
- Condylostylus sipho

Scientific classification
- Kingdom: Animalia
- Phylum: Arthropoda
- Class: Insecta
- Order: Diptera
- Family: Dolichopodidae
- Subfamily: Sciapodinae
- Tribe: Sciapodini
- Genus: Condylostylus
- Species: C. sipho

Binomial name
- Condylostylus sipho (Say, 1823)

Synonyms
- Dolichopus sipho Say, 1823; Psilopus gemmifer Walker, 1849; Psilopus scaber Loew, 1861

= Condylostylus sipho =

Species of fly

Condylostylus sipho is a species of fly in the family Dolichopodidae ("longlegged flies"). It is found in North America.
