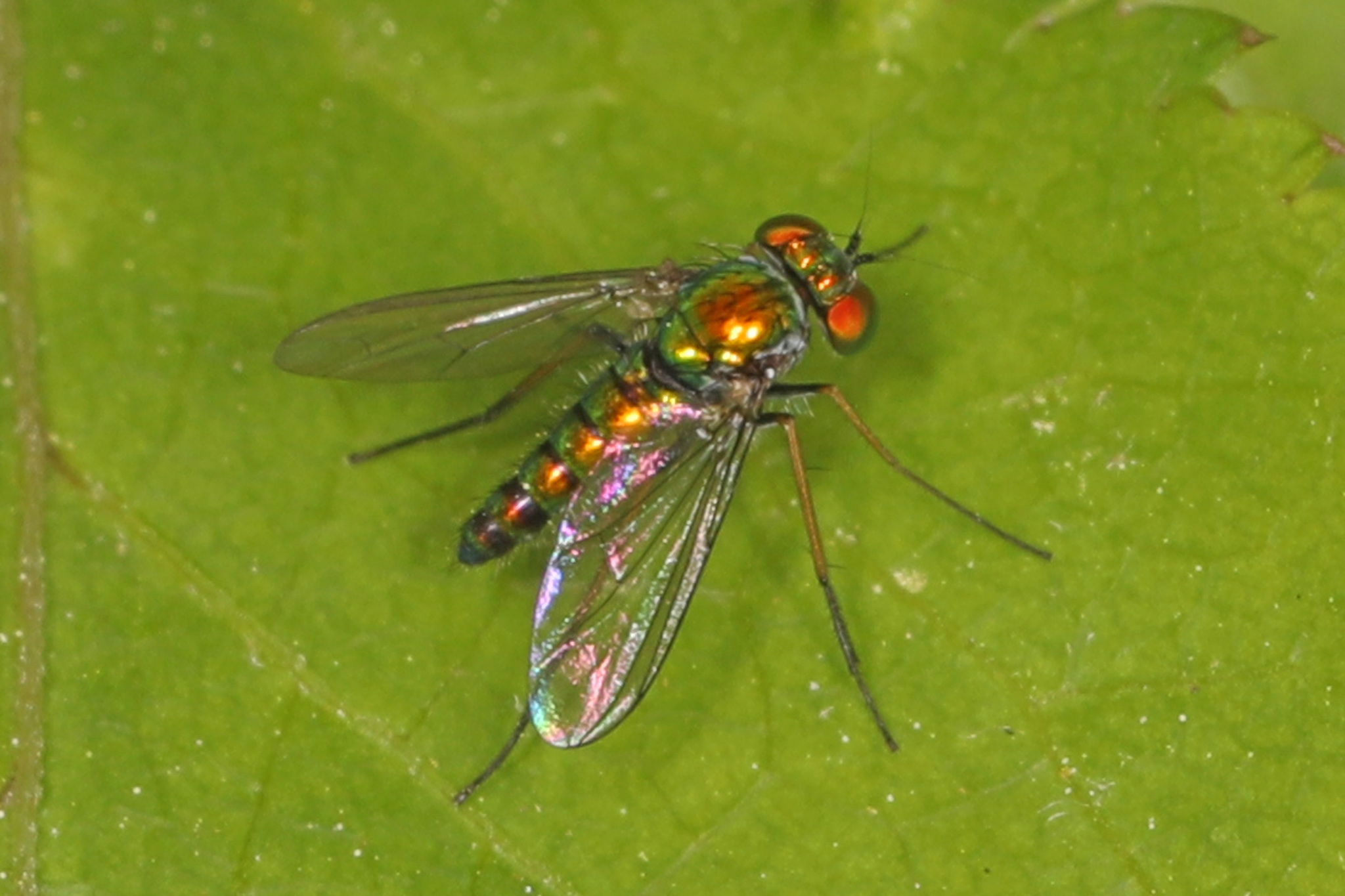

Scientific classification
- Kingdom: Animalia
- Phylum: Arthropoda
- Clade: Pancrustacea
- Class: Insecta
- Order: Diptera
- Family: Dolichopodidae
- Subfamily: Sciapodinae
- Tribe: Sciapodini
- Genus: Condylostylus
- Species: C. connectans

Binomial name
- Condylostylus connectans (Curran, 1942)

Synonyms
- Laxina connectans Curran, 1942

= Condylostylus connectans =

Species of fly

Condylostylus connectans is a species of long-legged fly in the family Dolichopodidae.
