= Naufraga =

Naufraga is the scientific name of two genera of organisms and may refer to:

- Naufraga (fly), a genus of insects in the family Dolichopodidae
- Naufraga (plant), a genus of plants in the family Apiaceae
