= Condylostylus furcatus =

Scientific classification
- Domain: Eukaryota
- Kingdom: Animalia
- Phylum: Arthropoda
- Class: Insecta
- Order: Diptera
- Family: Dolichopodidae
- Subfamily: Sciapodinae
- Tribe: Sciapodini
- Genus: Condylostylus
- Species: C. furcatus

Binomial name
- Condylostylus furcatus (Van Duzee, 1915)

Synonyms
- Sciapus furcatus Van Duzee, 1915

Species of fly

Condylostylus furcatus is a species of long-legged fly in the family Dolichopodidae.
