= Condylostylus graenicheri =

Scientific classification
- Domain: Eukaryota
- Kingdom: Animalia
- Phylum: Arthropoda
- Class: Insecta
- Order: Diptera
- Family: Dolichopodidae
- Subfamily: Sciapodinae
- Tribe: Sciapodini
- Genus: Condylostylus
- Species: C. graenicheri

Binomial name
- Condylostylus graenicheri (Van Duzee, 1927)

Synonyms
- Condylostylus tenuimanus Van Duzee, 1931; Psilopus graenicheri Van Duzee, 1927; Psilopus guttulus Wiedemann, 1830

Species of fly

Condylostylus graenicheri is a species of long-legged fly in the family Dolichopodidae.
