= Condylostylus occidentalis =

Scientific classification
- Kingdom: Animalia
- Phylum: Arthropoda
- Class: Insecta
- Order: Diptera
- Family: Dolichopodidae
- Subfamily: Sciapodinae
- Tribe: Sciapodini
- Genus: Condylostylus
- Species: C. occidentalis

Binomial name
- Condylostylus occidentalis (Bigot, 1888)

Synonyms
- Psilopodinus occidentalis Bigot, 1888; Psilopodinus pilicornis Aldrich, 1904

Species of fly

Condylostylus occidentalis is a species of long-legged fly in the family Dolichopodidae.
