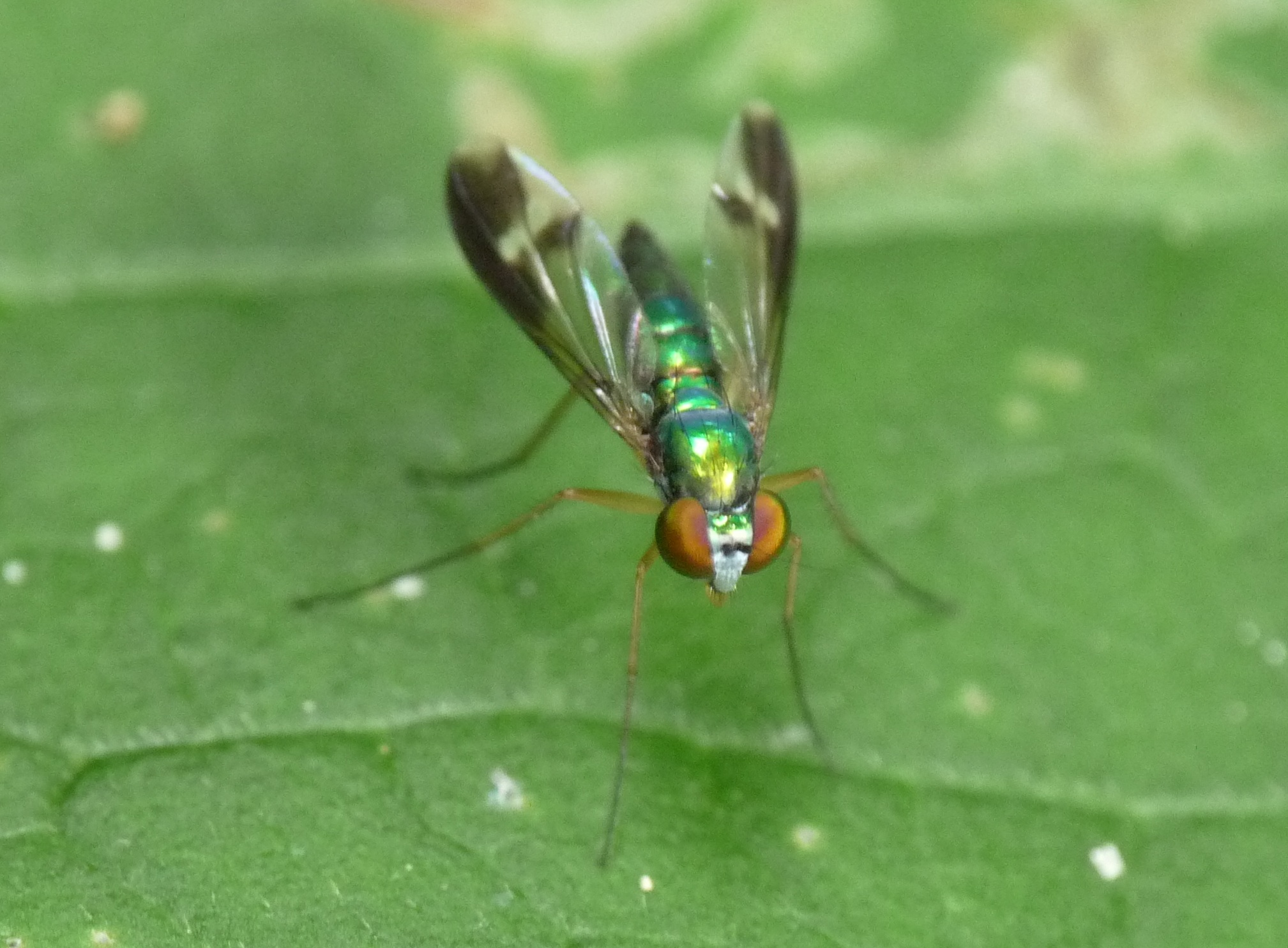

Scientific classification
- Kingdom: Animalia
- Phylum: Arthropoda
- Class: Insecta
- Order: Diptera
- Family: Dolichopodidae
- Genus: Condylostylus
- Species: C. nebulosus

Binomial name
- Condylostylus nebulosus (Matsumara, 1916)

Synonyms
- Psilopus nebulosus Matsumara, 1916; Condylostylus vigilans Becker, 1922 (preoccupied by Becker, 1921); Condylostylus beckeri Frey, 1925 (preoccupied by Speiser, 1920); Condylostylus theodori Frey, 1925

= Condylostylus nebulosus =

Species of fly

Condylostylus nebulosus is a species of fly in the family Dolichopodidae. It is found in eastern, south-eastern and southern Asia.
