= Pilbara octava =

Scientific classification
- Kingdom: Animalia
- Phylum: Arthropoda
- Clade: Pancrustacea
- Class: Insecta
- Order: Diptera
- Family: Dolichopodidae
- Subfamily: Sciapodinae
- Tribe: Sciapodini
- Genus: Pilbara; Bickel, 1994
- Species: P. octava

Binomial name
- Pilbara octava Bickel, 1994

Species of fly from Australia

Pilbara octava is a species of fly in the family Dolichopodidae from Australia, and the only member of the genus Pilbara. The genus is named after the Pilbara region of Western Australia, where P. octava was found. In particular, the only known location of P. octava is at Millstream, Fortescue River.
