= Helixocerus =

Scientific classification
- Kingdom: Animalia
- Phylum: Arthropoda
- Clade: Pancrustacea
- Class: Insecta
- Order: Diptera
- Family: Dolichopodidae
- Subfamily: Sciapodinae
- Tribe: Sciapodini
- Genus: Helixocerus; Lamb, 1929

Type species
- Helixocerus mendosus Lamb, 1929

Genus of flies

Helixocerus is a genus of flies in the family Dolichopodidae. It is known from New Caledonia, American Samoa and Samoa.

== Species ==
- Helixocerus koghis Bickel, 2002 – New Caledonia
- Helixocerus mendosus Lamb, 1929 – American Samoa, Samoa
