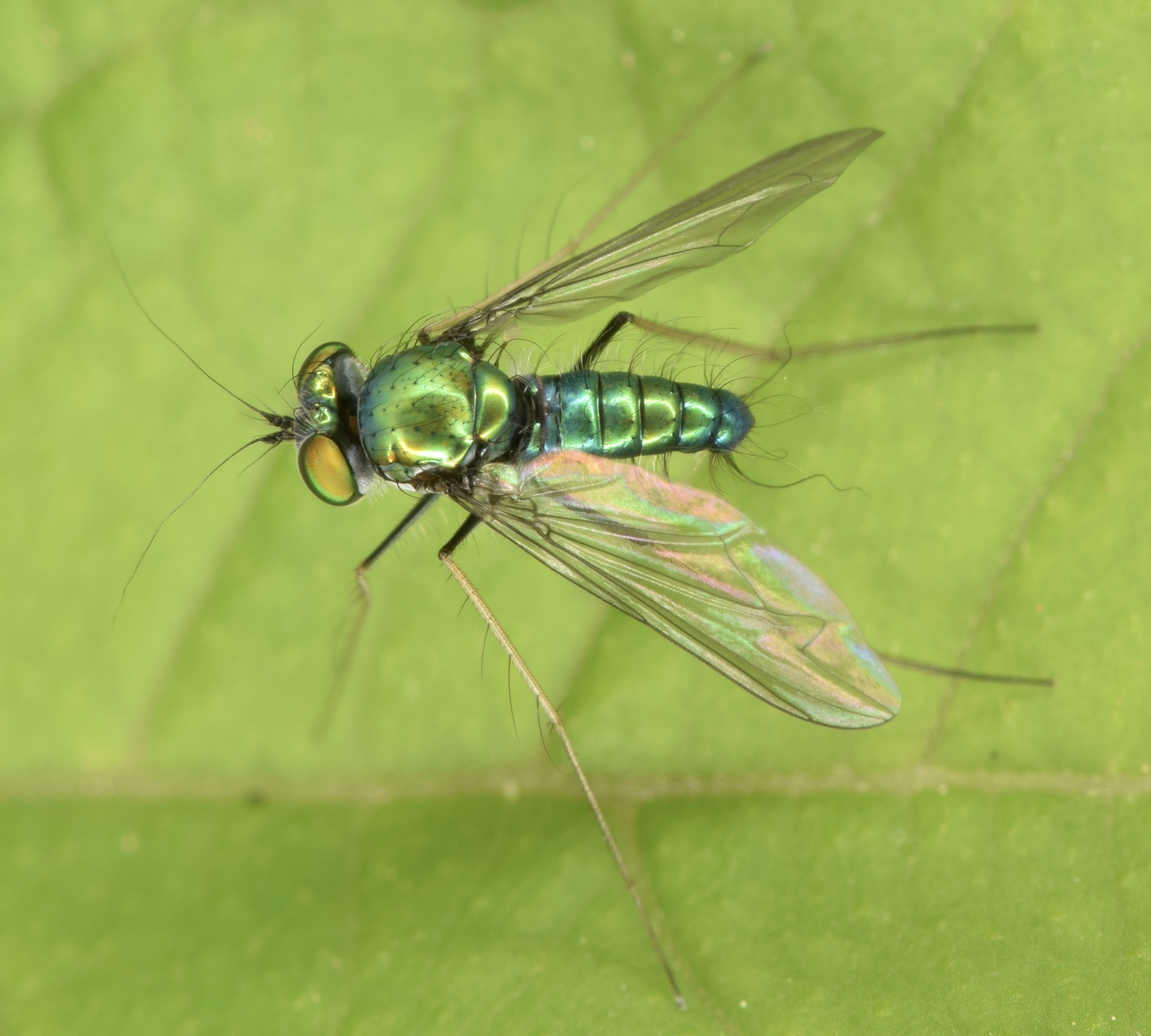

Scientific classification
- Kingdom: Animalia
- Phylum: Arthropoda
- Class: Insecta
- Order: Diptera
- Family: Dolichopodidae
- Genus: Condylostylus
- Species: C. comatus

Binomial name
- Condylostylus comatus (Loew, 1861)

Synonyms
- Psilopus comatus Loew, 1861; Sciapus chalybeus Van Duzee, 1914; Condylostylus chalybeus (Van Duzee, 1914)

= Condylostylus comatus =

Species of fly

Condylostylus comatus (C. comatus) is a species of fly in the family Dolichopodidae.

C. comatus is a species primarily found in the Eastern United States and belongs to a diverse Neotropical genus. Males can be identified by a row of hairs on the mid metatarsus and pale genital appendages, distinguishing them from similar species like Condylostylus crinitus. Females, however, are not distinguishable by appearance.
