= Narrabeenia =

Scientific classification
- Kingdom: Animalia
- Phylum: Arthropoda
- Clade: Pancrustacea
- Class: Insecta
- Order: Diptera
- Family: Dolichopodidae
- Subfamily: Sciapodinae
- Tribe: Sciapodini
- Genus: Narrabeenia; Bickel, 1994

Type species
- Sciapus difficilis Parent, 1933

Genus of flies

Narrabeenia is a genus of flies in the family Dolichopodidae, living in Australia and named for Narrabeen, New South Wales.

== Species ==
The genus contains two species:

- Narrabeenia difficilis (Parent, 1933)
- Narrabeenia spinipes Bickel, 1994
