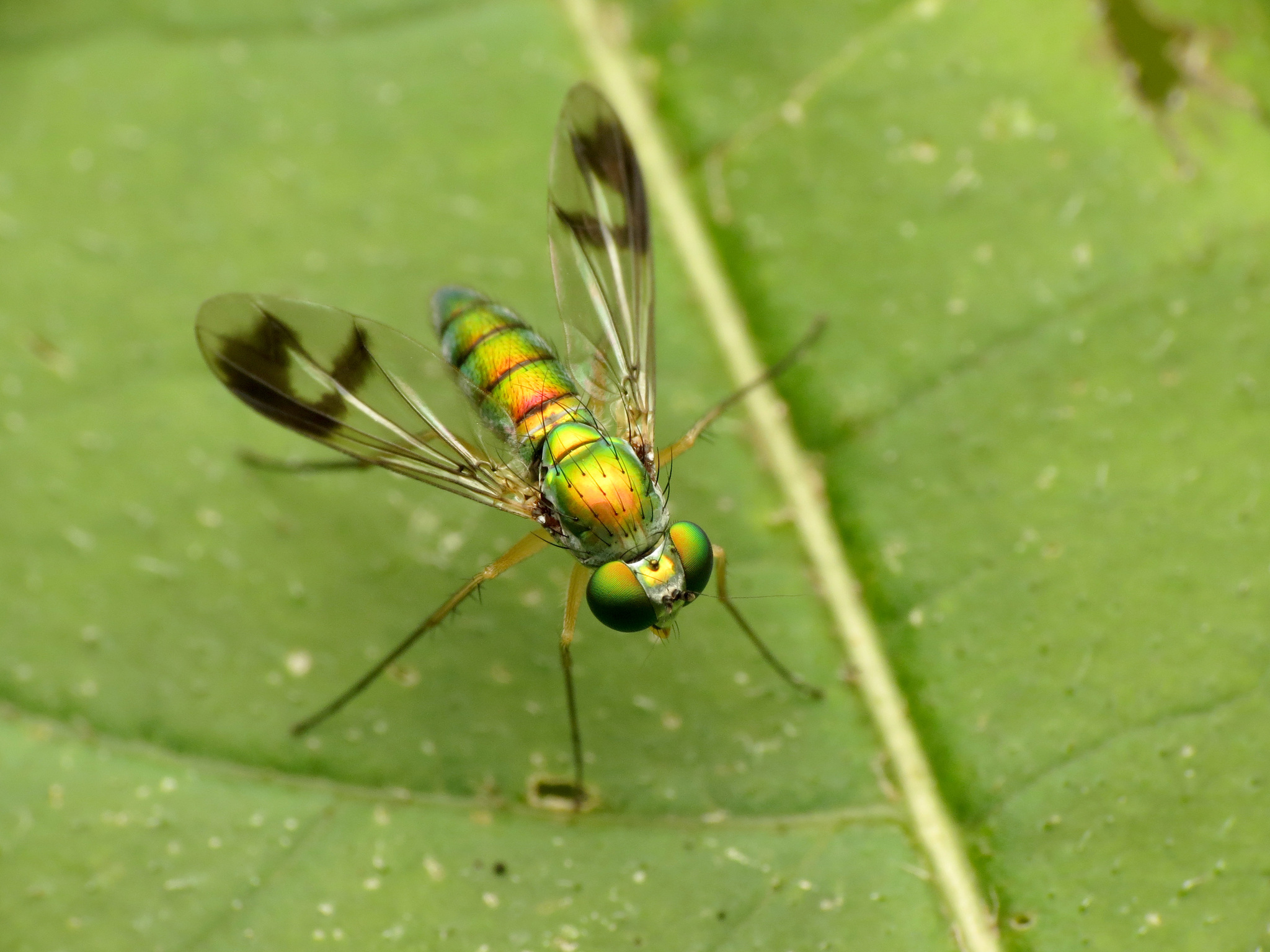
- Condylostylus cf. sipho in Rock Creek Park, Washington, DC, US

Scientific classification
- Kingdom: Animalia
- Phylum: Arthropoda
- Clade: Pancrustacea
- Class: Insecta
- Order: Diptera
- Family: Dolichopodidae
- Subfamily: Sciapodinae
- Tribe: Sciapodini
- Genus: Condylostylus; Bigot, 1859

Type species
- Psilopus bituberculatus Macquart, 1842

Synonyms
- Aldabromyia Meuffels & Grootaert, 2007; Dasypsilopus Bigot, 1859; Eurostomerus Bigot, 1859; Laxina Curran, 1934; Oedipsilopus Bigot, 1859; Tylochaetus Bigot, 1888

= Condylostylus =

Genus of flies

Condylostylus is a genus of flies in the family Dolichopodidae. It is the second largest genus in the subfamily Sciapodinae, with more than 250 species included. It has a high diversity in the Neotropical realm, where 70% of the species occur.

== Startle reflex ==
It was found in 2011 that Condylostylus sp. have one of the fastest reaction times in the animal kingdom, with a latency time of under 5ms and possibly as rapid as 2ms. In comparison, the latency time of a Housefly (Musca domestica) is 30-50ms in response to visual threats. While most insects rely on camouflage, distasteful compounds, or other physical defenses to deter predators, Condylostylus primarily uses its rapid response time to evade threats. Its bright, metallic coloring may be a signal to potential predators of Condylostylus, enabling predators to not waste energy trying to catch Condylostylus flies (other insects with metallic coloring such as Cuckoo wasps, Hairstreak butterflies, and Orchid bees are also fast fliers).

== Species ==
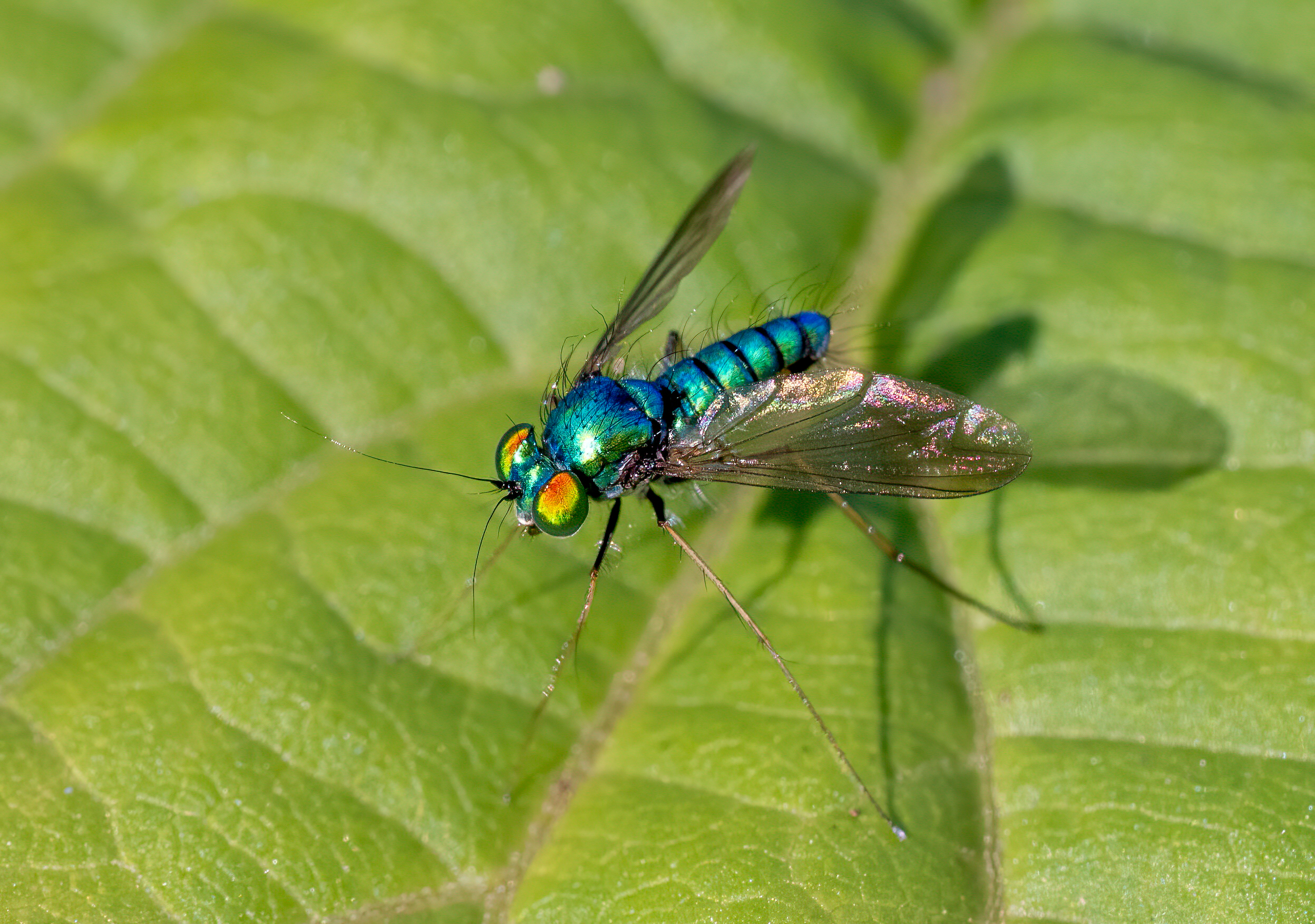
C. comatus in Brooklyn, New York, US

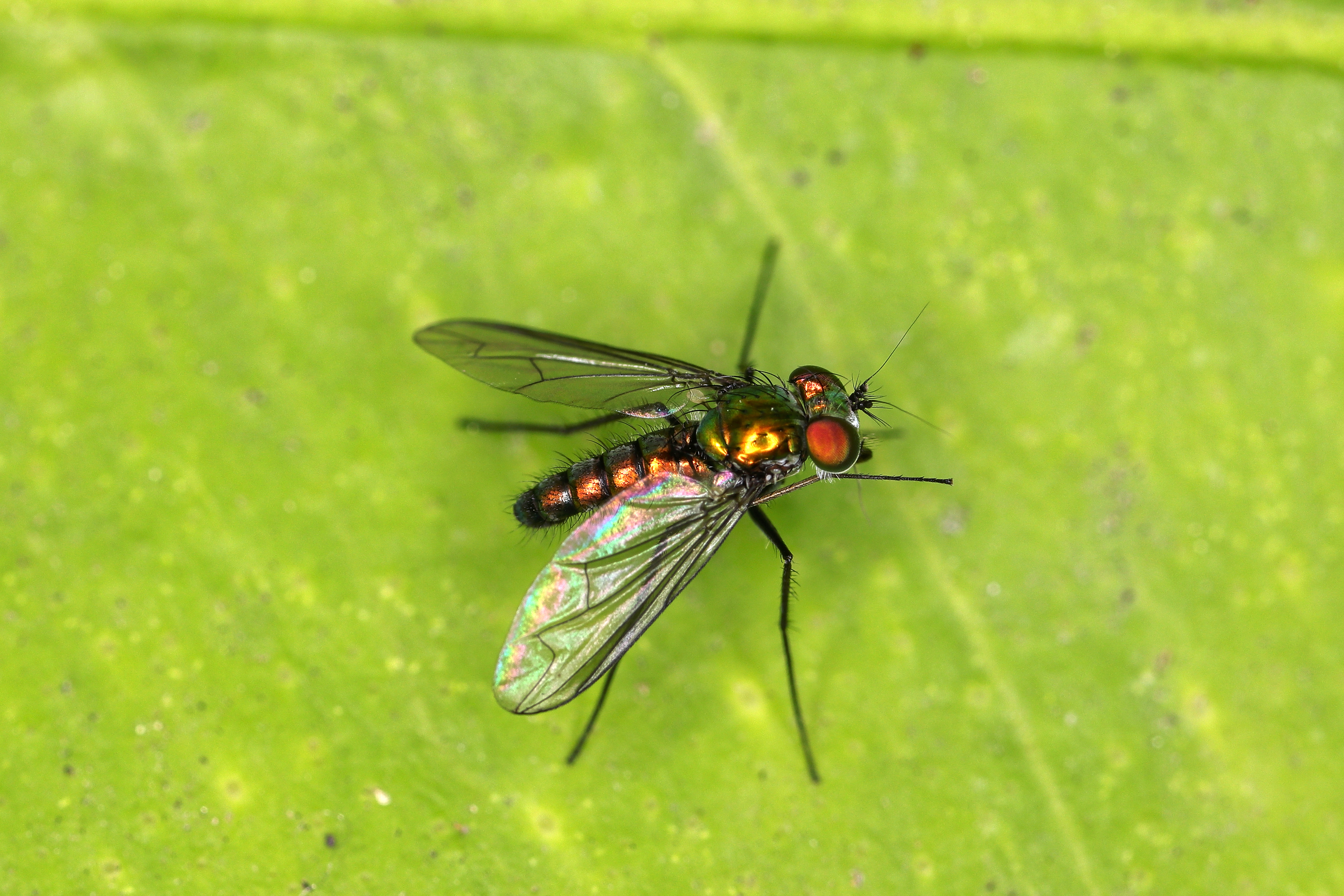
C. longicornis in Alameda County, California, US

- Condylostylus acceptus Parent, 1933
- Condylostylus alatus Becker, 1922
- Condylostylus albiciliatus (Van Duzee, 1927)
- Condylostylus albicoxa (Walker, 1849)
- Condylostylus albidipes Wei, 2006
- Condylostylus albifrons Parent, 1932
- Condylostylus albihirtus (Van Duzee, 1929)
- Condylostylus argentatus (Aldrich, 1901)
- Condylostylus argentifer Parent, 1929
- Condylostylus argentipes Parent, 1929
- Condylostylus armipes (Bigot, 1890)
- Condylostylus atricauda (Aldrich, 1901)
- Condylostylus atrolamellatus (Aldrich, 1901)
- Condylostylus atrox Becker, 1922
- Condylostylus banksi (Van Duzee, 1915)
- Condylostylus barbatulus Becker, 1922
- Condylostylus barbatus (Aldrich, 1901)
- Condylostylus basilaris (Wiedemann, 1830)
- Condylostylus basovi Grichanov, 1998
- Condylostylus beckeri Speiser, 1920
- Condylostylus bellulus (Aldrich, 1896)
- Condylostylus bicolor Zhu & Yang, 2011
- Condylostylus bicoloripes (Van Duzee, 1929)
- Condylostylus bifasciatus Parent, 1931
- Condylostylus bifilus (Van der Wulp, 1891)
- Condylostylus bifimbriatus (Aldrich, 1901)
- Condylostylus biseta Becker, 1922
- Condylostylus bisetosus Parent, 1930
- Condylostylus bisinuatus Van Duzee, 1931
- Condylostylus bituberculatus (Macquart, 1842)
- Condylostylus blepharotarsis Meuffels & Grootaert, 1999
- Condylostylus brayi Robinson, 1975
- Condylostylus brevihirtus Van Duzee, 1930
- Condylostylus brevilamellatus Parent, 1929
- Condylostylus brevimanus (Enderlein, 1912)
- Condylostylus brevipedis Van Duzee, 1931
- Condylostylus brevis Becker, 1922
- Condylostylus breviseta (Coquillett, 1902)
- Condylostylus brimleyi Robinson, 1964
- Condylostylus brunnicosus Frey, 1925
- Condylostylus burgeoni Parent, 1935
- Condylostylus caesar Becker, 1922
- Condylostylus caii Parent, 1934
- Condylostylus calcaratus (Loew, 1861)
- Condylostylus camptopus Parent, 1928
- Condylostylus cancer Van Duzee, 1934
- Condylostylus capitulatus Parent, 1929
- Condylostylus caudatus (Wiedemann, 1830)
- Condylostylus chaineyi Grichanov, 1998
- Condylostylus cilitarsis (Van der Wulp, 1888)
- Condylostylus cilitibia Parent, 1939
- Condylostylus cinctiventris Van Duzee, 1934
- Condylostylus clavatus (Van Duzee, 1929)
- Condylostylus clavipes (Aldrich, 1901)
- Condylostylus clivus Wei & Song, 2005
- Condylostylus cochlearis Becker, 1922
- Condylostylus coerulus (Macquart in Bigot, 1859)
- Condylostylus coloradensis Van Duzee, 1932
- Condylostylus comatus (Loew, 1861)
- Condylostylus comes Parent, 1933
- Condylostylus comorensis Grichanov, 2020
- Condylostylus completus Becker, 1922
- Condylostylus confluens Becker, 1922
- Condylostylus connectans (Curran, 1942)
- Condylostylus conspectus Becker, 1922
- Condylostylus corculum (Walker, 1849)
- Condylostylus cornutus Van Duzee, 1931
- Condylostylus coxalis (Aldrich, 1901)
- Condylostylus crinicauda Parent, 1929
- Condylostylus crinitus (Aldrich, 1904)
- Condylostylus ctenopus (Enderlein, 1912)
- Condylostylus cylindricus (Van Duzee, 1929)
- Condylostylus damingshanus Wang, Zhu & Yang, 2012
- Condylostylus danieli Grichanov, 2010
- Condylostylus denticulatus Van Duzee, 1931
- Condylostylus depressus (Aldrich, 1901)
- Condylostylus diffusus (Wiedemann, 1830)
- Condylostylus digitiformis Yang, 1998
- Condylostylus diminuans Becker, 1922
- Condylostylus distinctus Van Duzee, 1931
- Condylostylus diversipes Becker, 1922
- Condylostylus dives Parent, 1929
- Condylostylus dominicensis Robinson, 1975
- Condylostylus erectus Becker, 1922
- Condylostylus erroneus Grichanov, 2004
- Condylostylus exemtus (Walker, 1852)
- Condylostylus exquisitus (Walker, 1852)
- Condylostylus facetus Parent, 1933
- Condylostylus fascinator Parent, 1933
- Condylostylus fastuosus Parent, 1933
- Condylostylus felix Becker, 1922
- Condylostylus fenestratus (Van der Wulp, 1891)
- Condylostylus fenestrella Parent, 1933
- Condylostylus filiformis Becker, 1922
- Condylostylus filipeniculatus (Enderlein, 1912)
- Condylostylus fimbriatus Parent, 1928
- Condylostylus flagellatus Becker, 1922
- Condylostylus flagellipodex Becker, 1922
- Condylostylus flavicoxa (Aldrich, 1901)
- Condylostylus flavilamellatus Becker, 1922
- Condylostylus flavipedus Zhu & Yang, 2011
- Condylostylus flavipes (Aldrich, 1904)
- Condylostylus floridus Parent, 1939
- Condylostylus forcipatus (Aldrich, 1901)
- Condylostylus formosus (Parent, 1934)
- Condylostylus fraterculus (Enderlein, 1912)
- Condylostylus friedmani Grichanov, 2020
- Condylostylus fujianensis Yang & Yang, 2003
- Condylostylus fupingensis Yang & Saigusa, 2005
- Condylostylus furcatus (Van Duzee, 1915)
- Condylostylus furcatus Zhu & Yang, 2011 (needs new name)
- Condylostylus fuscipennis Van Duzee, 1934
- Condylostylus fusitarsis Van Duzee, 1933
- Condylostylus galinae Grichanov, 1996
- Condylostylus gavryushini Grichanov, 2020
- Condylostylus gemma (Bigot, 1890)
- Condylostylus geniculatus Yang, 1998
- Condylostylus genualis (Aldrich, 1901)
- Condylostylus gorgonensis Parent, 1933
- Condylostylus gracilis (Aldrich, 1904)
- Condylostylus graenicheri (Van Duzee, 1927)
- Condylostylus guttula (Wiedemann, 1830)
- Condylostylus hamiformis Becker, 1922
- Condylostylus helioi Miward de Azevedo, 1976
- Condylostylus hirsutus Becker, 1922
- Condylostylus hirtipes (Aldrich, 1901)
- Condylostylus ignobilis Becker, 1922
- Condylostylus ignoratus Becker, 1922
- Condylostylus ignotus Becker, 1922
- Condylostylus imitator Curran, 1924
- Condylostylus impar Becker, 1922
- Condylostylus impatiens Becker, 1922
- Condylostylus imperator (Aldrich, 1904)
- Condylostylus imperialis (Fabricius, 1805)
- Condylostylus inermis (Loew, 1861)
- Condylostylus inopinatus (Parent, 1933)
- Condylostylus inornatus (Aldrich, 1901)
- Condylostylus insignitus Parent, 1929
- Condylostylus insularis (Aldrich, 1896)
- Condylostylus interceptus (Aldrich, 1901)
- Condylostylus itoi Kasagi, 2006
- Condylostylus japonicus Kasagi, 1984
- Condylostylus kaplini Grichanov, 2020
- Condylostylus kivuensis Vanschuytbroeck, 1964
- Condylostylus latiapicatus (Van Duzee, 1933)
- Condylostylus latimanus Van Duzee, 1931
- Condylostylus latipennis Parent, 1941
- Condylostylus latitarsis (Becker, 1922)
- Condylostylus lavatus Parent, 1930
- Condylostylus leigongshanus Wei & Yang, 2007
- Condylostylus leonardi (Van Duzee, 1915)
- Condylostylus lepidopus Frey, 1928
- Condylostylus lepidus (Walker, 1852)
- Condylostylus libidinosus Parent, 1933
- Condylostylus longicaudatus Zhu & Yang, 2011
- Condylostylus longicornis (Fabricius, 1775)
- Condylostylus longipennis (Van Duzee, 1929)
- Condylostylus longitalus (Van Duzee, 1923)
- Condylostylus lopesi Miward de Azevedo, 1976
- Condylostylus loriferus (Parent, 1934)
- Condylostylus lunator Curran, 1925
- Condylostylus luteicinctus Parent, 1930
- Condylostylus luteicoxa Parent, 1929
- Condylostylus lutheri (Frey, 1917)
- Condylostylus lutzi Freitas & Lopes, 1941
- Condylostylus madagascarensis Grichanov, 2020
- Condylostylus melampus (Loew, 1862)
- Condylostylus mensor (Van Duzee, 1929)
- Condylostylus mireciliatus Parent, 1928
- Condylostylus miripennis Parent, 1931
- Condylostylus miripes Parent, 1933
- Condylostylus mirus Parent, 1931
- Condylostylus moniliventris Parent, 1934
- Condylostylus mundus (Wiedemann, 1830)
- Condylostylus nebulosus (Matsumura, 1916)
- Condylostylus nigripilosus Robinson, 1975
- Condylostylus nigrofemoratus (Walker, 1849)
- Condylostylus nobilissimus (Aldrich, 1901)
- Condylostylus nubeculus Becker, 1922
- Condylostylus nudifacies Van Duzee, 1930
- Condylostylus nudipes Becker, 1922
- Condylostylus occidentalis (Bigot, 1888)
- Condylostylus ocellatus Parent, 1930
- Condylostylus oedipus Becker, 1922
- Condylostylus ogilvii (Malloch, 1932)
- Condylostylus ornaticauda Van Duzee, 1931
- Condylostylus ornatipennis (De Meijere, 1910)
- Condylostylus ornatipes Van Duzee, 1931
- Condylostylus ornatus Parent, 1931
- Condylostylus paraterminalis Dyte, 1975
- Condylostylus paricoxa Parent, 1939
- Condylostylus patellitarsis Becker, 1922
- Condylostylus pateraeformis Becker, 1923
- Condylostylus patibulatus (Say, 1823)
- Condylostylus pectinator Parent, 1930
- Condylostylus pectinatus Becker, 1922
- Condylostylus pedestris Becker, 1922
- Condylostylus penicilliger (Enderlein, 1912)
- Condylostylus pennatus Parent, 1929
- Condylostylus pennifer (Aldrich, 1901)
- Condylostylus perforatus Parent, 1934
- Condylostylus perplexus (Parent, 1933)
- Condylostylus perspicuus Becker, 1922
- Condylostylus pilipes (Macquart, 1842)
- Condylostylus pilosus (Loew, 1861)
- Condylostylus plagiochaetus (Meuffels & Grootaert, 2007)
- Condylostylus plumitarsis Parent, 1933
- Condylostylus plutus Parent, 1929
- Condylostylus posticatus (Wiedemann, 1830)
- Condylostylus praestans (Aldrich, 1901)
- Condylostylus pressitarsus Parent, 1931
- Condylostylus pretiosus (Walker, 1849)
- Condylostylus productipes Parent, 1934
- Condylostylus profundus Becker, 1922
- Condylostylus pruinifrons Parent, 1929
- Condylostylus pruinosus (Coquillett, 1904)
- Condylostylus pseudoparicoxa Grichanov, 1999
- Condylostylus pulchripes Becker, 1922
- Condylostylus pulchritarsis Van Duzee, 1931
- Condylostylus punctumalbum Parent, 1929
- Condylostylus purpuratus (Aldrich, 1901)
- Condylostylus purpureus (Aldrich, 1901)
- Condylostylus quadricolor (Walker, 1849)
- Condylostylus quadriseriatus Robinson, 1975
- Condylostylus rex Parent, 1929
- Condylostylus rubrocauda Van Duzee, 1931
- Condylostylus salti (Van Duzee, 1929)
- Condylostylus scaber (Loew, 1861)
- Condylostylus schmidti (Parent, 1954)
- Condylostylus schnusei Becker, 1922
- Condylostylus selectus Parent, 1931
- Condylostylus selitskayae Grichanov, 1998
- Condylostylus semiciliatus (Van Duzee, 1929)
- Condylostylus seminiger Becker, 1922
- Condylostylus serenus Becker, 1922
- Condylostylus setifer Parent, 1929
- Condylostylus setitarsis Van Duzee, 1931
- Condylostylus simplex Becker, 1922
- Condylostylus sinclairi Grichanov, 2000
- Condylostylus singularis Becker, 1922
- Condylostylus sinuatus (Macquart, 1842)
- Condylostylus sipho (Say, 1823)
- Condylostylus skufjini Grichanov, 1998
- Condylostylus squamifer Becker, 1922
- Condylostylus stigma (Fabricius, 1805)
- Condylostylus striatipennis Becker, 1922
- Condylostylus subcordatus Becker, 1922
- Condylostylus subgeniculatus Yang & Saigusa, 2005
- Condylostylus sumptuosus Parent, 1929
- Condylostylus superbus (Wiedemann, 1830)
- Condylostylus superfluus (Schiner, 1868)
- Condylostylus surinamensis Parent, 1928
- Condylostylus tarsatus Van Duzee, 1932
- Condylostylus tenebrosus (Walker, 1857)
- Condylostylus tenuipes Becker, 1922
- Condylostylus tenuis (Van Duzee, 1933)
- Condylostylus terciliatus Parent, 1928
- Condylostylus terminalis Becker, 1922
- Condylostylus tibialis (Wiedemann, 1830)
- Condylostylus tonsus (Aldrich, 1901)
- Condylostylus trimaculatus Van Duzee, 1931
- Condylostylus triseriatus (Aldrich, 1901)
- Condylostylus tumantumari Curran, 1925
- Condylostylus ulrichi Grichanov, 2000
- Condylostylus umbrinervis Parent, 1933
- Condylostylus unguipes Becker, 1922
- Condylostylus uniseriatus Becker, 1922
- Condylostylus varitibia Van Duzee, 1932
- Condylostylus victorisetae Hollis, 1964
- Condylostylus vietnamensis Li, Li & Yang, 2012
- Condylostylus vigilans Becker, 1922
- Condylostylus villosus Parent, 1928
- Condylostylus violaceus (Macquart, 1842)
- Condylostylus viridicoxa (Aldrich, 1904)
- Condylostylus viridis Parent, 1929
- Condylostylus xixianus Yang & Saigusa, 2000
- Condylostylus xizangensis Zhu & Yang, 2007
- Condylostylus yaromi Grichanov, 1999
- Condylostylus yunnanensis Zhu & Yang, 2007

Unrecognised species:

- Condylostylus femoratus (Say, 1823)
- Condylostylus imperfectus Becker, 1922
- Condylostylus inficitus (Walker, 1849)
- Condylostylus nitidus (Walker, 1852)
- Condylostylus pleuralis (Thomson, 1869)
- Condylostylus stigma (Wiedemann, 1830)

Species considered nomina dubia:

- Condylostylus amoris (Walker, 1849)
- Condylostylus anceps (Wiedemann, 1830)
- Condylostylus clathratus (Macquart, 1842)
- Condylostylus detegendus Parent, 1935
- Condylostylus dux (Wiedemann, 1830)
- Condylostylus equestris (Fabricius, 1775)
- Condylostylus flavizonatus Parent, 1954
- Condylostylus guyanensis (Macquart, 1842)
- Condylostylus haereticus (Walker, 1860)
- Condylostylus hirtulus (Bigot, 1888)
- Condylostylus incisuralis (Macquart, 1845)
- Condylostylus leprieuri (Macquart, 1842)
- Condylostylus pampoecilus (Bigot, 1888)
- Condylostylus permodicus (Walker, 1860)
- Condylostylus polychromus (Bigot, 1890)
- Condylostylus portoricensis (Macquart, 1834)
- Condylostylus pulcher (Wiedemann, 1830)
- Condylostylus smaragdulus (Wiedemann, 1830)
- Condylostylus solidus (Walker, 1860)
- Condylostylus suavium (Walker, 1849)

Species considered nomina nuda:

- Condylostylus inconstans Becker, 1918
- Condylostylus simplicitarsis Becker, 1922

The following species are synonyms of other species:

- Condylostylus acuminatus Van Duzee, 1930: Synonym of C. erectus Becker, 1922
- Condylostylus albicoxa (Walker, 1849): Synonym of C. caudatus (Wiedemann, 1830)
- Condylostylus astequinus (Bigot, 1888): Synonym of C. quadricolor (Walker, 1849)
- Condylostylus barbipes Van Duzee, 1934: Synonym of C. imperialis (Fabricius, 1805)
- Condylostylus barbitarsus Parent, 1928: Synonym of C. brevimanus (Enderlein, 1912)
- Condylostylus chalybeus (Van Duzee, 1914): Synonym of C. comatus (Loew, 1861)
- Condylostylus ciliatus Parent, 1929 (preoccupied by C. ciliatus (Loew, 1861)): Renamed to C. blepharotarsis Meuffels & Grootaert, 1999
- Condylostylus clunalis (Coquillett, 1902): Synonym of C. atrolamellatus (Aldrich, 1901)
- Condylostylus congensis Curran, 1927: synonym of C. beckeri Speiser, 1920
- Condylostylus currani Parent, 1929: Synonym of C. melampus (Loew, 1862)
- Condylostylus debilis Becker, 1922: Synonym of C. crinitus (Aldrich, 1904)
- Condylostylus decoripes Becker, 1922: Synonym of C. forcipatus (Aldrich, 1901)
- Condylostylus digitatus (Van Duzee, 1914): Synonym of C. quadricolor (Walker, 1849)
- Condylostylus flavimanus (Macquart, 1842): Synonym of C. longicornis (Fabricius, 1775)
- Condylostylus furcillatus Parent, 1928: Synonym of C. atrolamellatus (Aldrich, 1901)
- Condylostylus imitans Curran, 1926 (preoccupied by C. imitans Curran, 1925): Renamed to C. erroneus Grichanov, 2004
- Condylostylus insolitus Van Duzee, 1930: Synonym of C. subcordatus Becker, 1922
- Condylostylus jucundus (Loew, 1861): Synonym of C. quadricolor (Walker, 1849)
- Condylostylus longiseta (Coquillett, 1902): Synonym of C. depressus (Aldrich, 1901)
- Condylostylus metallifer (Walker, 1849): Synonym of C. longicornis (Fabricius, 1775)
- Condylostylus nigripes (Macquart, 1842): Synonym of C. longicornis (Fabricius, 1775)
- Condylostylus nigritibia Van Duzee, 1932: Synonym of C. quadricolor (Walker, 1849)
- Condylostylus nitidicauda (Van Duzee, 1929): Synonym of C. atrolamellatus (Aldrich, 1901)
- Condylostylus panamensis (Van Duzee, 1929): Synonym of C. purpureus (Aldrich, 1901)
- Condylostylus peractus (Walker, 1860): Synonym of C. mundus (Wiedemann, 1830)
- Condylostylus perpilosus Robinson, 1975: Synonym of C. albiciliatus (Van Duzee, 1927)
- Condylostylus pilicornis (Aldrich, 1904): Synonym of C. occidentalis (Bigot, 1888)
- Condylostylus quintusflavus Gunther, 1980: Synonym of C. caudatus (Wiedemann, 1830)
- Condylostylus radians (Macquart, 1834): Synonym of C. longicornis (Fabricius, 1775)
- Condylostylus retrociliatus Parent, 1931: Synonym of C. atrolamellatus (Aldrich, 1901)
- Condylostylus saccicauda Parent, 1934: Synonym of C. perspicuus Becker, 1922
- Condylostylus semicomatus (Van Duzee, 1929): Synonym of C. villosus Parent, 1928
- Condylostylus sexsetosus Van Duzee, 1931: Synonym of C. forcipatus (Aldrich, 1901)
- Condylostylus simulans (Van Duzee, 1929): Synonym of C. atrolamellatus (Aldrich, 1901)
- Condylostylus tenuimanus Van Duzee, 1931: Synonym of C. graenicheri (Van Duzee, 1927)
- Condylostylus trichosoma (Bigot, 1890): Synonym of C. longicornis (Fabricius, 1775)
- Condylostylus vagans Becker, 1922: Synonym of C. forcipatus (Aldrich, 1901)
- Condylostylus villosipes Parent, 1933: Synonym of C. imperialis (Fabricius, 1805)
