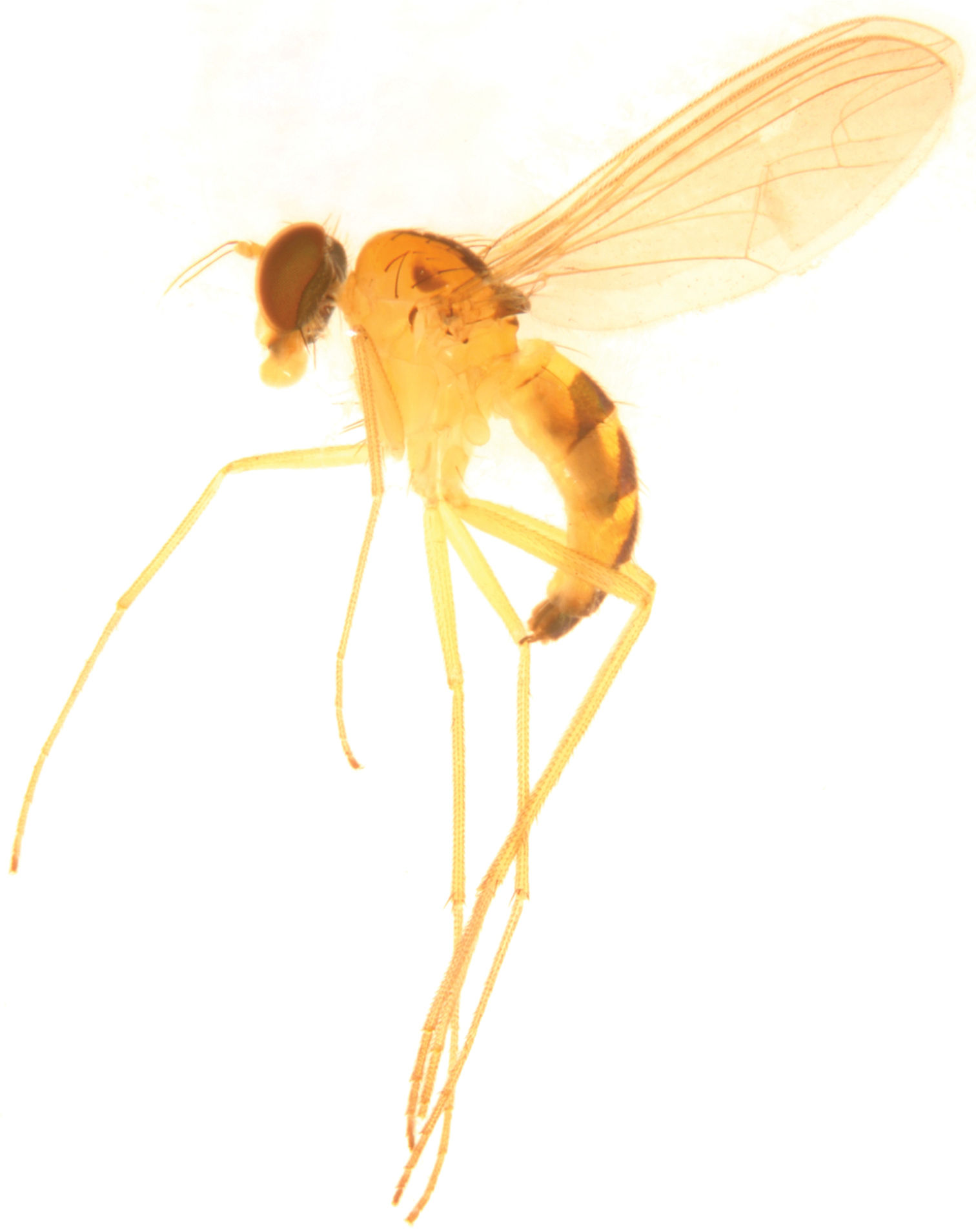
- Sinosciapus liuae

Scientific classification
- Domain: Eukaryota
- Kingdom: Animalia
- Phylum: Arthropoda
- Class: Insecta
- Order: Diptera
- Family: Dolichopodidae
- Subfamily: Sciapodinae
- Tribe: Sciapodini
- Genus: Sinosciapus; Yang, 2001

Type species
- Sinosciapus tianmushanus Yang, 2001

= Sinosciapus =

Genus of flies

Sinosciapus is a genus of flies in the family Dolichopodidae. It is known from China.

== Species ==
- Sinosciapus liuae Yang & Zhu, 2011
- Sinosciapus tianmushanus Yang, 2001
- Sinosciapus yunlonganus Yang & Saigusa, 2001
