= Dytomyia =

Scientific classification
- Kingdom: Animalia
- Phylum: Arthropoda
- Class: Insecta
- Order: Diptera
- Family: Dolichopodidae
- Subfamily: Sciapodinae
- Tribe: Sciapodini
- Genus: Dytomyia; Bickel, 1994

Type species
- Sciapus sordidus Parent, 1928

Genus of flies

Dytomyia is a genus in the Dolichopodidae: the name is an eponym of Peter Dyte, a specialist in this family of flies. It is known from Australia, Madagascar and Kenya, with an undescribed species from Papua New Guinea.

== Species ==
The genus contains the following species:

- Dytomyia bancrofti Bickel, 1994 – Australia
- Dytomyia deconinckae Grichanov, 1998 – Madagascar
- Dytomyia flavicaudata Grichanov, 2021 – Kenya
- Dytomyia elenae Grichanov, 1998 – Madagascar
- Dytomyia flaviseta Bickel, 1994 – Australia
- Dytomyia lutescens (Vanschuytbroeck, 1952) – Madagascar
- Dytomyia paulyi Grichanov, 1998 – Madagascar
- Dytomyia sordida (Parent, 1928) – Australia
- Dytomyia torresiana Bickel, 1994 – Australia
- Dytomyia tumifrons Bickel, 1994 – Australia

The species Sciapus nubilis Parent, 1935, which was described from a single female from Madagascar, was transferred to this genus in 2003, but was later considered a nomen dubium in 2021.
