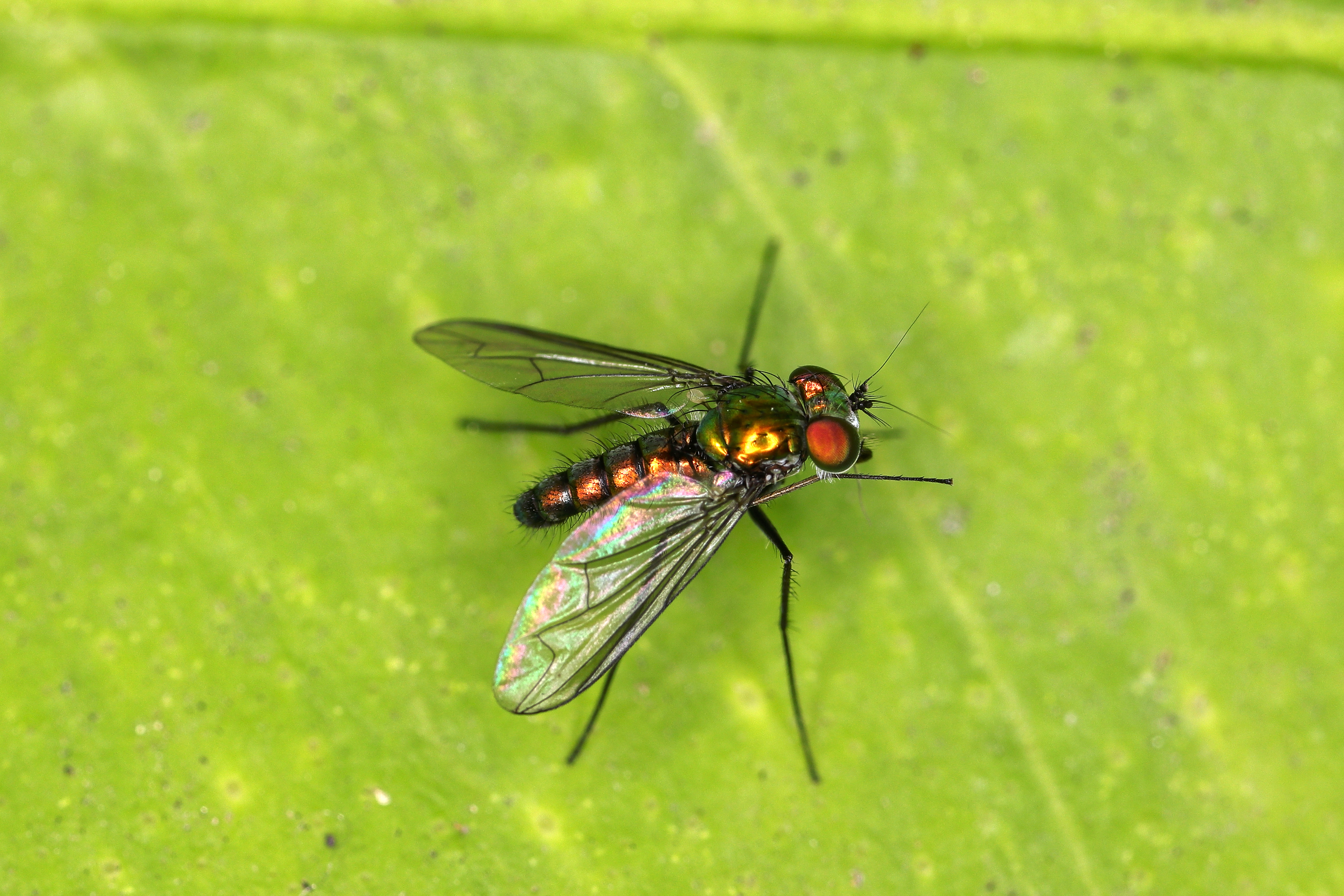

Scientific classification
- Kingdom: Animalia
- Phylum: Arthropoda
- Class: Insecta
- Order: Diptera
- Family: Dolichopodidae
- Genus: Condylostylus
- Species: C. longicornis

Binomial name
- Condylostylus longicornis (Fabricius, 1775)

Synonyms
- Synonymy: Musca longicornis Fabricius, 1775; Psilopus radians Macquart, 1834; Psilopus nigripes Macquart, 1842; Psilopus flavimanus Macquart, 1842; Psilopus chrysoprasi Walker, 1849; Psilopus metallifer Walker, 1849; Psilopus zonatulus Thomson, 1869; Psilopus trichosoma Bigot, 1890; Psilopus ciliipes Aldrich, 1901; Condylostylus dentaticauda Van Duzee, 1933

= Condylostylus longicornis =

Species of fly

Condylostylus longicornis is a fly of the genus Condylostylus. It is widespread, natively ranging from the Southern United States through tropical South America and the Galápagos Islands. It has also been introduced to French Polynesia, Hawaii, Australia, China, India, Indonesia, Papua New Guinea, the Philippines, Sri Lanka, and the United Arab Emirates.

== Description ==
C. longicornis is a long-legged, green fly with an iridescent exoskeleton. Like other flies in the Condylostylus genus, it holds its wings diagonally while at rest. C. longicornis can be differentiated by dark femora, a brown fore tibia, and non-uniform bristles along the mid- and fore-tibiae. Males of the species have a sparse row of bristles along the mid tibia and basitarsus, and females will always have a yellow mid-tibia.

== Habitat ==
C. longicornis generally prefer habitats that are lightly shaded and near swamps, streams, meadows, or woodlands.
