= Bickelia =

Scientific classification
- Kingdom: Animalia
- Phylum: Arthropoda
- Class: Insecta
- Order: Diptera
- Family: Dolichopodidae
- Subfamily: Sciapodinae
- Tribe: Sciapodini
- Genus: Bickelia; Grichanov, 1996

Type species
- Bickelia subparallela (= Psilopus parallelus Macquart, 1842) Grichanov, 1996

Genus of flies

Bickelia is a genus of flies in the family Dolichopodidae. It is named after the Australian dipterologist Daniel J. Bickel.

== Species ==
- Bickelia digrediens (Meuffels & Grootaert, 2007)
- Bickelia parallela (Macquart, 1842)
