= Pouebo symmetricauda =

Scientific classification
- Domain: Eukaryota
- Kingdom: Animalia
- Phylum: Arthropoda
- Class: Insecta
- Order: Diptera
- Family: Dolichopodidae
- Subfamily: Sciapodinae
- Genus: Pouebo; Bickel, 2008
- Species: P. symmetricauda

Binomial name
- Pouebo symmetricauda Bickel, 2008

Species of fly

Pouebo symmetricauda is a species of fly belonging to the family Dolichopodidae. It is the only member of the genus Pouebo, and was described from New Caledonia.
