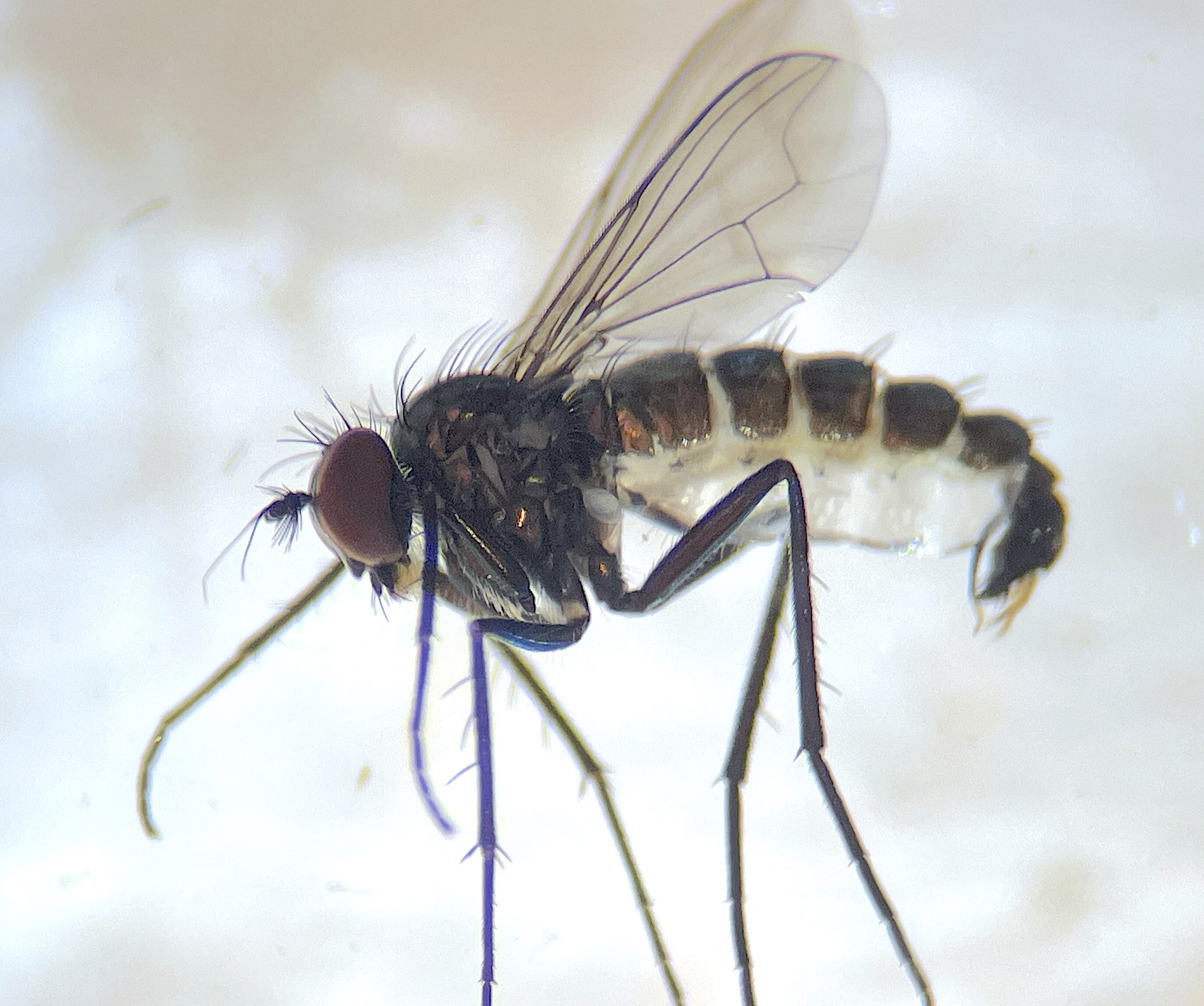
- Naufraga hexachaeta found near Lake Tekapo, New Zealand

Scientific classification
- Kingdom: Animalia
- Phylum: Arthropoda
- Class: Insecta
- Order: Diptera
- Family: Dolichopodidae
- Subfamily: Sciapodinae
- Tribe: Sciapodini
- Genus: Naufraga; Bickel, 1992
- Species: N. hexachaeta

Binomial name
- Naufraga hexachaeta (Parent, 1933)

Synonyms
- Condylostylus hexachaetus Parent, 1933

= Naufraga hexachaeta =

Species of fly

Naufraga hexachaeta is a species of fly in the family Dolichopodidae. It is the only member of the genus Naufraga, and is found only in the South Island of New Zealand.

The genus name Naufraga is derived from the Latin word naufragus, meaning 'shipwrecked', in reference to the isolated position of the genus within the subfamily Sciapodinae. (Bickel states that its isolated position is 'as if it were shipwrecked on the shores of New Zealand'.)
