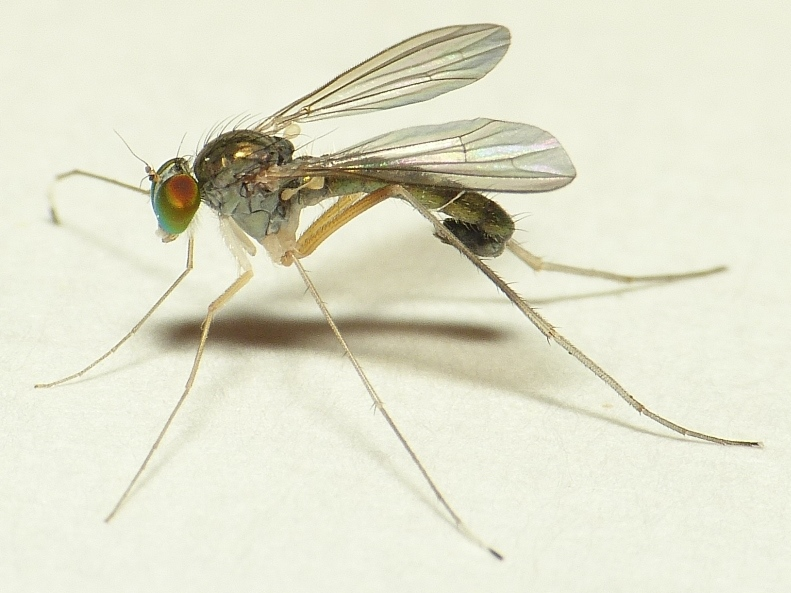
- Sciapus platypterus

Scientific classification
- Kingdom: Animalia
- Phylum: Arthropoda
- Class: Insecta
- Order: Diptera
- Family: Dolichopodidae
- Subfamily: Sciapodinae
- Tribe: Sciapodini; Becker, 1917

Genera
- see text

= Sciapodini =

Tribe of flies

Sciapodini is a tribe of flies in the family Dolichopodidae.

== Genera ==
- Bickelia Grichanov, 1996
- Condylostylus Bigot, 1859
- Dytomyia Bickel, 1994
- Helixocerus Lamb, 1929
- Mascaromyia Bickel, 1994
- Narrabeenia Bickel, 1994
- Naufraga Bickel, 1992
- Pilbara Bickel, 1994
- Sciapus Zeller, 1842
- Sinosciapus Yang, 2001
