= Madrid Metro =

Rapid transit system in Madrid, Spain

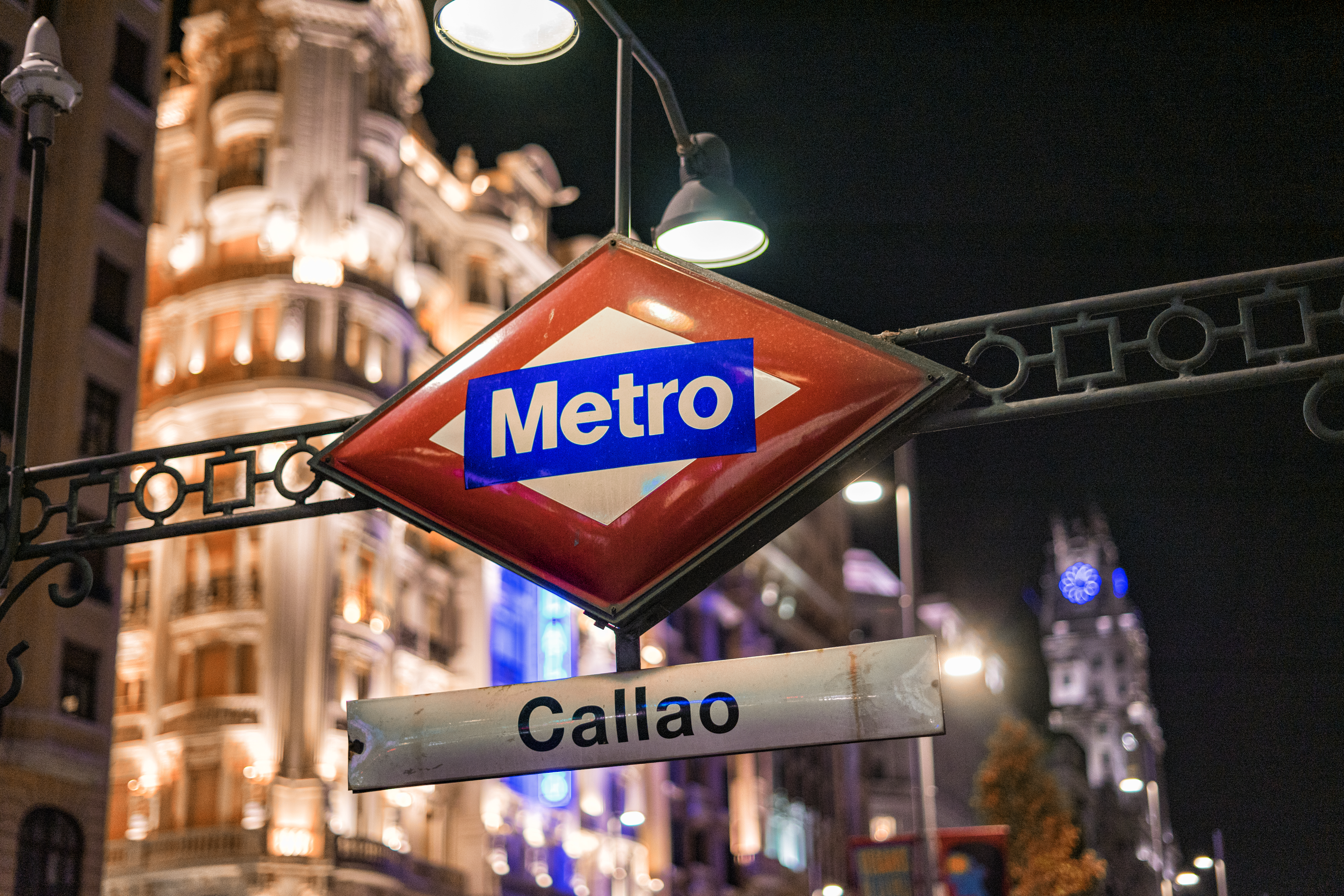
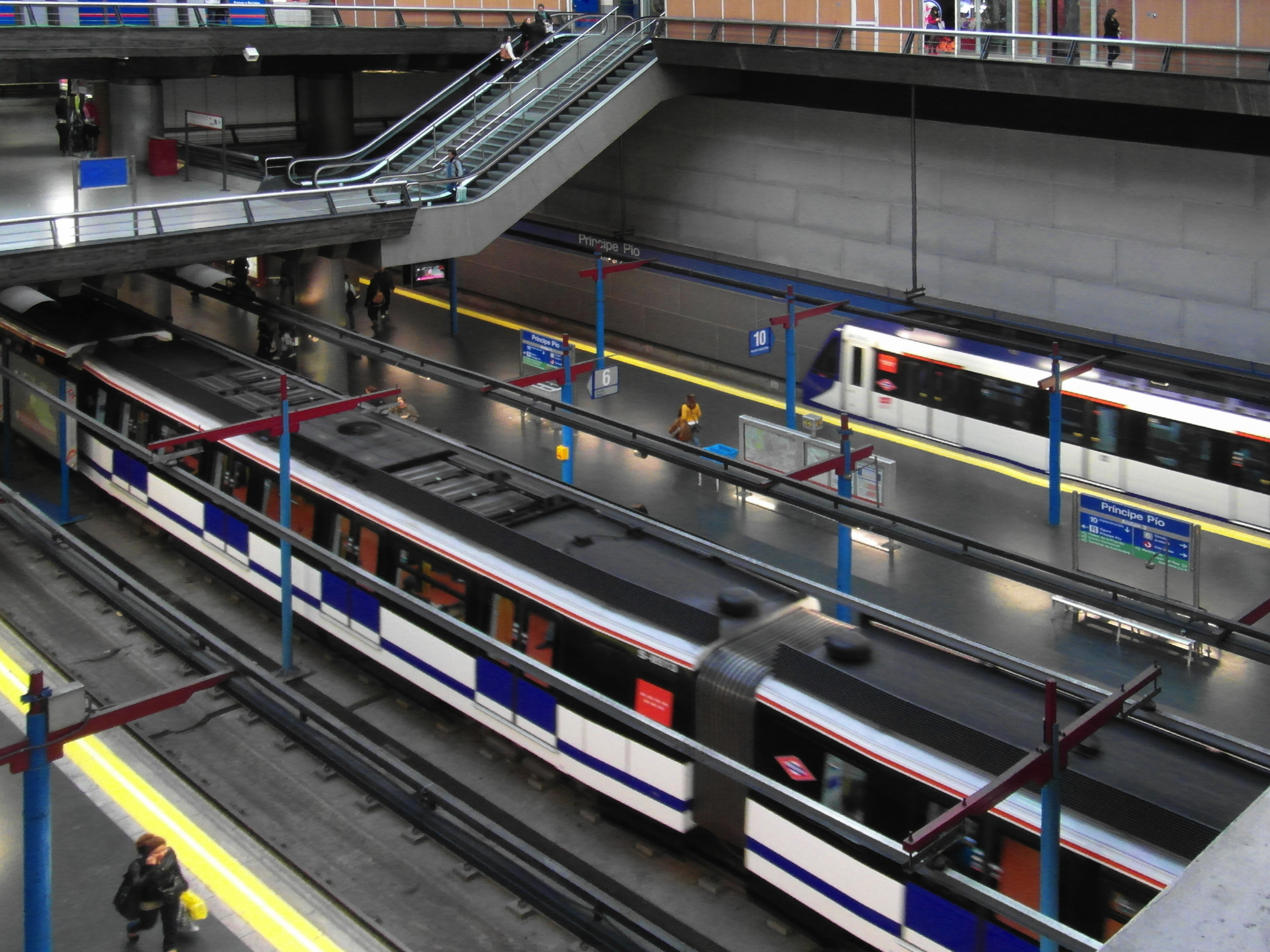
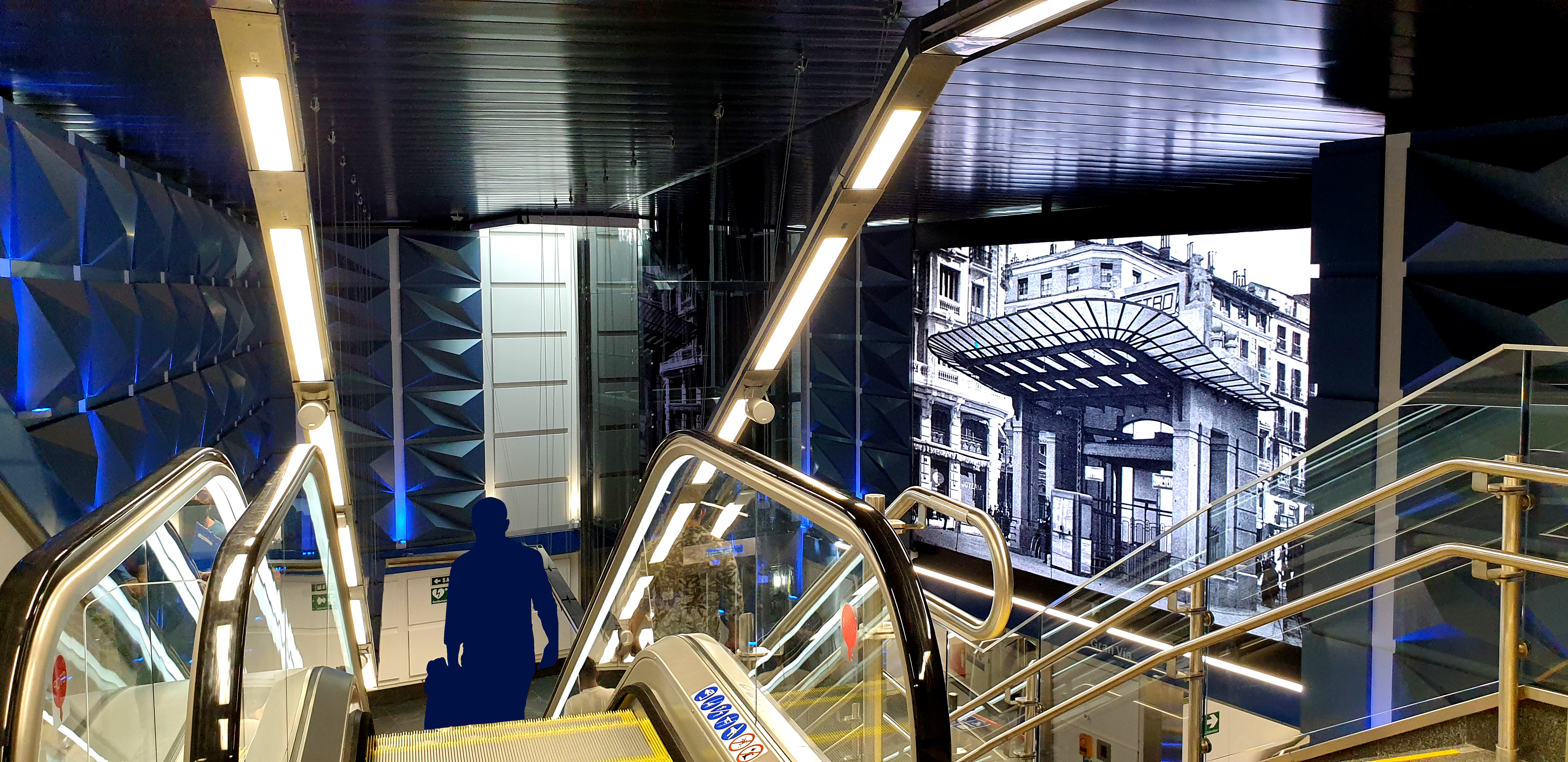
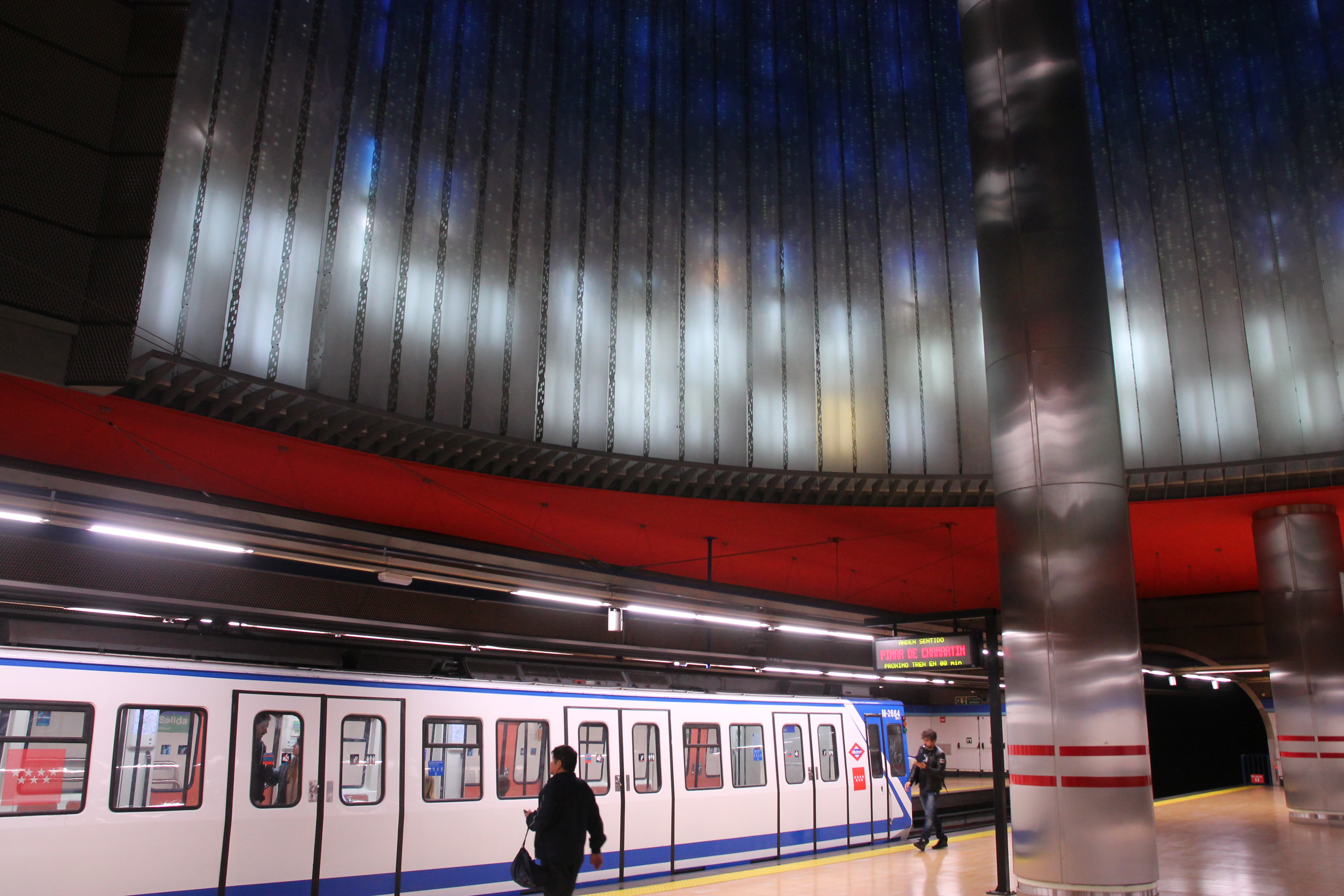
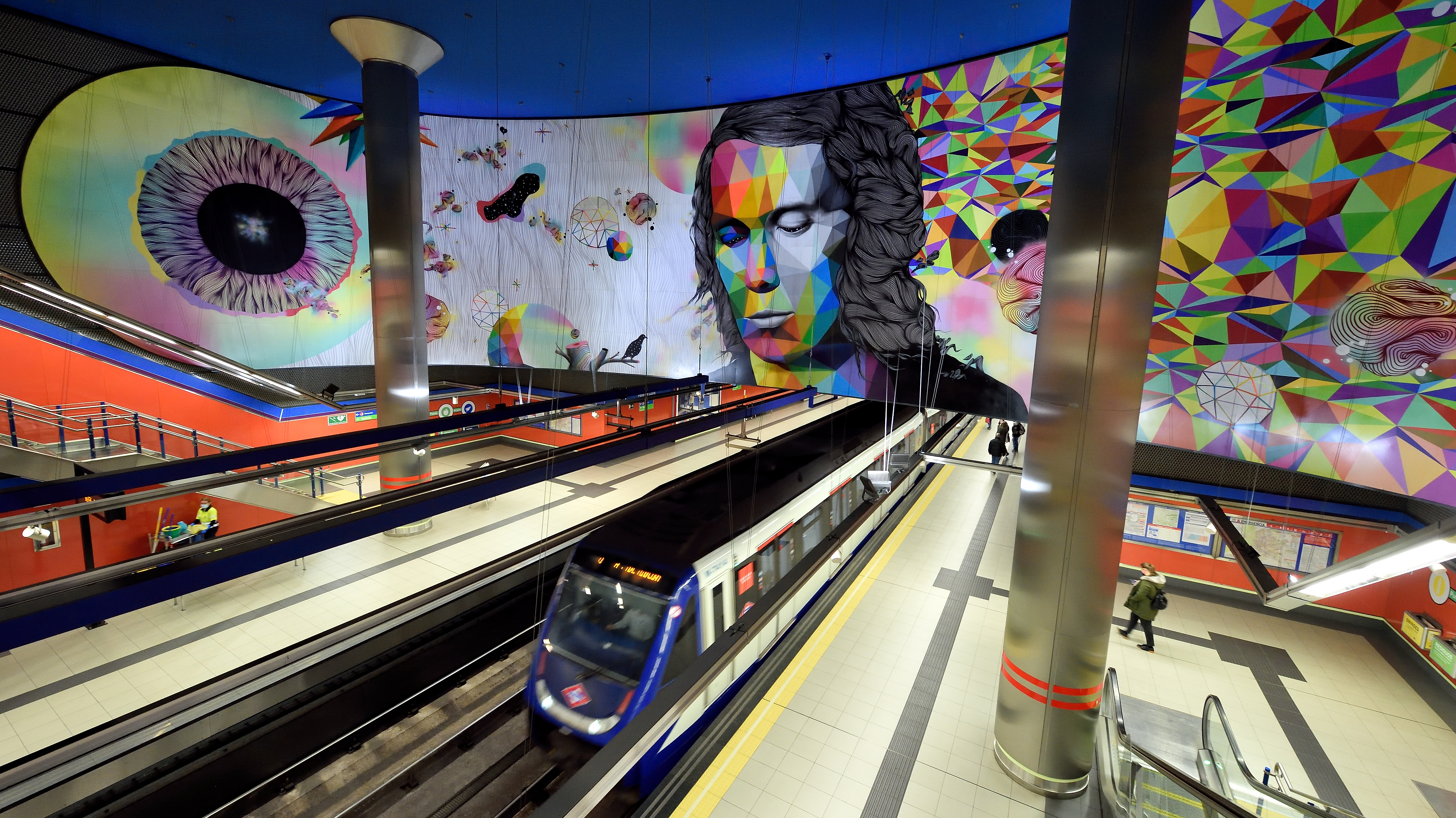
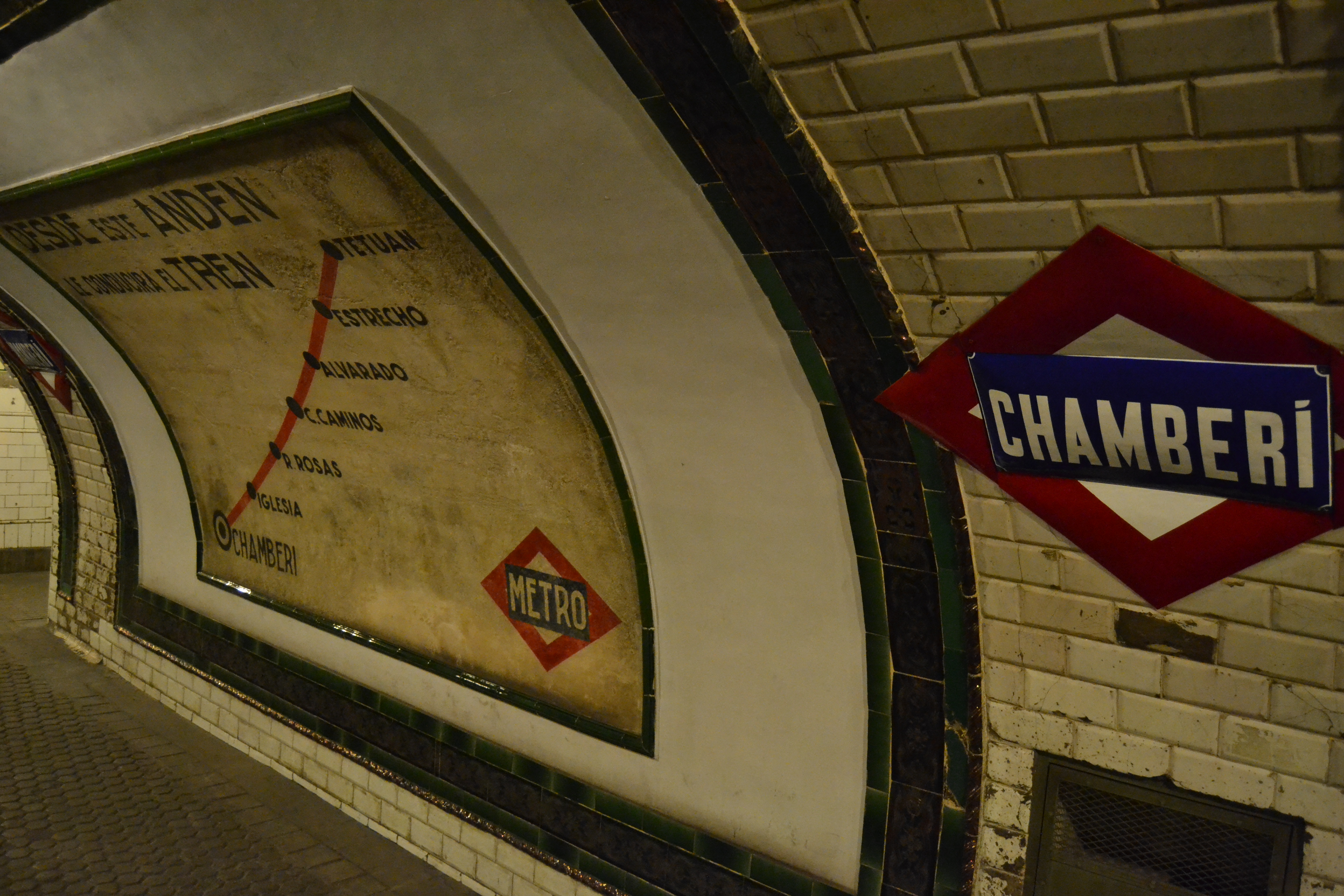

Overview
- Native name: Metro de Madrid
- Owner: Autonomous Government of the Community of Madrid
- Locale: Madrid, Spain
- Transit type: Rapid transit
- Number of lines: 13
- Number of stations: 240 (Note: The number 240 is obtained if interchange stations are counted as one, and if the Acacias/Embajadores and Noviciado/Plaza de España interchanges are also counted as one (since they form a single paid area despite having separate names depending on the line). If instead all stations are counted by just adding up the number of stations on each line (as is done in most official documents and reports), thus counting interchange stations once per line served, the total number of stations rises to 291.)
- Daily ridership: 2.4 million
- Annual ridership: 715.0 million (2024)
- Website: Metro de Madrid

Operation
- Began operation: 17 October 1919; 107 years ago
- Operator: Metro de Madrid
- Number of vehicles: 2083 carriages

Technical
- System length: 296.6 km (184.3 mi)
- Track gauge: 1,445 mm (4 ft 8 7/8 in)
- Electrification: Overhead power supply: 600 V DC (lines 1, 4, 5, 9); 1,500 V DC (all other lines)
System map

The Madrid Metro (Spanish: Metro de Madrid) is a rapid transit system serving the metropolitan area of Madrid, the capital of Spain. First opened in 1919, the system has regularly undergone numerous extensions over the next century, bringing it to today's network which comprises thirteen lines (including one two-station shuttle line). The network is largely managed by Metro de Madrid S.A., which is owned by the Government of the Community of Madrid.

As of September 2025, the lines have a combined length of 296.6 kilometres (184.3 mi), making Madrid's Metro system the 20th longest rapid transit system in the world, the 6th longest in the world outside of China, and the 3rd longest in Europe behind only the Moscow Metro and the London Underground. The whole system transported a total of 715 million passengers in 2024 – in this metric Madrid's system stands as the 29th most-used in the world and the 5th most-used in Europe, behind Moscow, Paris, London and Istanbul.

Unlike Spanish road traffic and most railway lines in the country, which drive on the right, trains on the Madrid Metro have operated with left-hand running since the system's inception.

Within the Community of Madrid, the Madrid Metro is complemented by the light-rail Metro Ligero network operated with trams, the Madrid Cercanías suburban rail services managed by the national rail operator Renfe, as well as a large network of urban bus lines operated by the city-owned EMT Madrid, and a collection of interurban bus lines that serve municipalities outside of the city's boundaries, managed by the Community of Madrid itself but operated by private companies on a concession basis. All of these public transportation networks have a unified fare system, which is managed by the Consorcio Regional de Transportes de Madrid (CRTM), a public body run by a consortium of various local governments of the Community of Madrid.

Trains are in circulation every day between 06:00 and 01:30. There had been plans to extend the operating hours on Friday and Saturday nights – first to 02:30 from 2020, and then to 24-hour operation from 2023 – but the coronavirus pandemic halted these plans, and as of February 2026 the system still closes at 01:30 throughout the week. However, the Metro has been known to stay open for 24 hours on at least two special occasions in its history: in summer 2017 during World Pride and in January 2021 during the Madrid snowstorm.

As of September 2025, the Madrid Metro has 1,709 escalators and 571 lifts.

== History ==
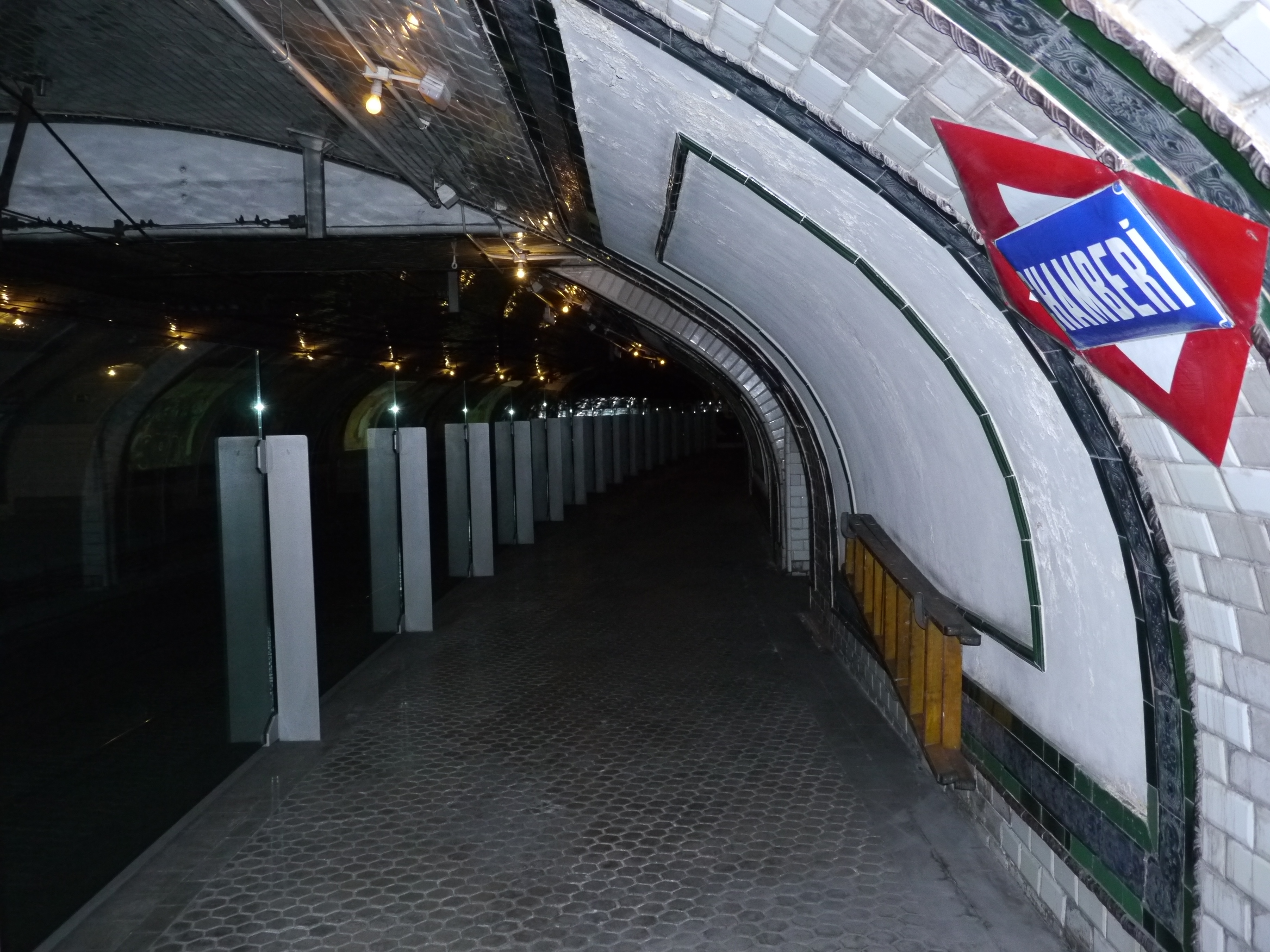
The closed Chamberí station on line 1

=== 1916–1918: conception and financing ===
On 19 September 1916, a royal decree approved the 4-line plan for the creation of the metro of Madrid. The engineers who created the plan - Mendoza, González Echarte, and Otamendi - then began the process of raising 8 million pesetas to begin the first phase of the project, the construction of line 1 from Sol to Cuatro Caminos. Carlos Mendoza made contact with Enrique Ocharán, the director of Banco de Vizcaya, who offered 4 million pesetas on the condition that the public pledged an additional 4 million.

Mengemor published a brochure to persuade people to make donations. The men were able to raise 2.5 million pesetas of the 4 million they needed. King Alfonso XIII intervened and invested 1.45 million pesetas of his own money.

=== 1919: construction and inauguration ===
The first phase of construction was finished in 1919. It was constructed in a narrow section and the stations had 60 m (200 ft) platforms. The enlargement of this line and the construction of two others followed shortly after 1919. The Madrid metro was inaugurated on 17 October 1919 by King Alfonso XIII. At the time of inauguration, the metro had just one line, which ran for 3.48 kilometres (2.16 mi) between Puerta del Sol and Cuatro Caminos, with eight stops.

The king, the royal family, and others took part in the first official metro ride which went from Cuatro Caminos to Ríos Rosas and took 40 seconds. There they stopped for one minute, before traveling to the Chamberí station which took 45 seconds. The trip went all the way to the end point, Sol. The king and his family then rode the metro back to Cuatro Caminos from Sol, this time without stopping. The journey took 7 minutes and 46 seconds.

After the journey, a lunch was served on the Cuatro Caminos platform, and the engineers were congratulated for creating a "miracle."

Two days later, on 19 October 1919, the Madrid metro was opened to the public. On its first day, 390 trains ran, 56,220 passengers rode the metro, and the company earned 8,433 pesetas from ticket fares.

During November and December 1919, the metro had an average of 43,537 passengers a day and earned an average of 6,530 pesetas a day from ticket sales. Due to their success, the company decided to expand more, and created 12,000 new shares to sell to the public to raise more funds to fund further expansion.

=== 1920–1921: expansion of line 1 and construction of line 2 ===
The Company then began to gather materials necessary to expand the line 1 from Sol with the new stations Progreso, Antón Martín and finally Atocha. The latter was then and is now an important train station for mainline rail.

On 31 July 1920 the company submitted its proposal to extend line 1 from Atocha to Puente de Vallecas. In 1921 the company declared its interest in beginning the line from Sol to Ventas, with the first phase of the project being built from Sol to Goya, along Calle Alcalá.

Work began on 27 March 1921 to expand line 1 from Atocha to Vallecas, and to begin construction on a line from Sol to Goya.

On 26 December 1921 the Sol-Atocha section of line 1 was inaugurated, adding three new metro stops to the line: Progreso, Antón Martín, and Atocha. The king and queen, Don Alfonso XIII and Doña Victoria, attended the inauguration.

=== 1922 and onwards ===
In 1924, traffic in Madrid switched from driving on the left to driving on the right, but the lines of the Madrid Metro kept operating on the left hand side. In 1936, the network had three lines and a branch line between Ópera and the old Estación del Norte (now Príncipe Pío). All these stations served as air raid shelters during the Spanish Civil War. After the Civil war, the public work to extend the network went on little by little. In 1944, a fourth line was constructed, absorbing the branch of line 2 between Goya and Diego de León in 1958, a branch that had been intended to be part of line 4 since its construction but was operated as a branch of line 2 until construction works had finished.

In the 1960s, a suburban railway was constructed between Plaza de España and Carabanchel, linked to lines 2 (at Noviciado station with a long transfer) and 3. A fifth metro line was constructed as well with narrow sections, but 90m platforms. Shortly after opening the first section of line 5, the platforms of line 1 were enlarged from 60 to 90m, permanently closing Chamberí station since it was too close to Iglesia (less than 500m). Chamberí has been closed to passengers ever since; it reopened as a museum in 2008.

In the early 1970s, the network was greatly expanded to cope with the influx of population and urban sprawl from Madrid's economic boom. New lines were planned with larger 115m long platforms. Lines 4 and 5 were enlarged as well. In 1979, bad management led to a crisis. Projects that had already started were finished during the 1980s and all remaining ones were abandoned. After all those projects, 100 km (62 mi) of rail track was completed by 1983 and the suburban railway had also disappeared since it had been extended to Alonso Martínez and subsequently converted to the new line 10.

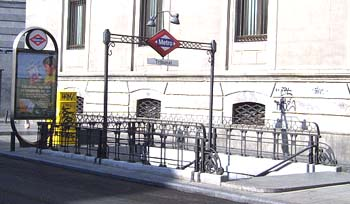
Typical Madrid metro entrance, designed by Antonio Palacios, at Tribunal station

=== Expansion from the 1990s ===
Work on a major expansion of the metro began in 1995, with 172 km (107 mi) of new line and 132 new stations opened by 2011, built in 4 phases. The average construction pace throughout that era (more than 10 km (6 mi) of new line per year) was among the fastest in the world at that time and was equalled or surpassed by only very few metros in the global north (one notable example being Seoul Metro) either then or since.

This included the extension of lines 1, 4 and 7 and the construction of a new line 11 towards the outlying areas of Madrid. Lines 8 and 10 were joined into a longer line 10 and a new line 8 was constructed to expand the underground network towards the airport. The enlarged line 9 was the first to leave the outskirts of Madrid to arrive in Rivas-Vaciamadrid and Arganda del Rey, two satellite towns located in the southeast of Madrid. Control of the network was transferred to a public enterprise, Metro de Madrid S.A.

In the early 2000s, a huge project installed approximately 50 km (31 mi) of new metro tunnels. This construction included a further extension of line 8 that gave a direct connection between central Madrid (Nuevos Ministerios) and the airport, as well as one of the largest ever civil engineering projects in Europe – MetroSur. The bulk of the latter project envisaged the construction of a new 41 km-long (25 mi) loop line connecting five cities located south-southwest of Madrid, namely Móstoles, Alcorcón, Leganés, Getafe and Fuenlabrada. The line's construction began in June 2000 and the whole loop was completed in less than three years, opening on 11 April 2003 as line 12. As the metro line was part of a larger plan to develop the area, some stations lay in sparsely populated places or were even surrounded by fields at the time of opening. The MetroSur project also included a southern extension of line 10 to the city of Alcorcón to connect with this new loop line.

Most of the efforts of Madrid regional government in 2000s were channeled towards the enlargement of the Metro network. In the 2003–2007 term, President Esperanza Aguirre funded a multibillion-euro project, which added new lines, and joined or extended almost all of the existing metro lines. The project included the addition of 90 km (56 mi) of railway and the construction of 80 new stations. It brought stations to many districts that had never previously had Metro service (Villaverde, Manoteras, Carabanchel Alto, La Elipa, Pinar de Chamartín) and to the eastern and northern outskirts as well (Coslada, San Fernando de Henares, Alcobendas, San Sebastián de los Reyes). As a last minute addition, a project on line 8 connected it to the new T4 terminal of Madrid-Barajas Airport. The light-rail Metro Ligero network was also built at this time, serving the less densely populated northern districts of Sanchinarro and Las Tablas and the western towns of Pozuelo de Alarcón and Boadilla del Monte.

Since 2008, however, the process of expanding the network has significantly slowed. The 2008 financial crisis stalled many expansion projects that had been in their pending stages at the time, while during the 2010s, improving the existing network was considered a higher priority than enlarging it, with major projects such as the improved accessibility plan being put into place. As a result, while all lines except for the (already circular) line 6 had benefitted from at least some form of extension between 1999 and 2008, during the 2010s only four extension projects were completed: line 11 was taken to La Fortuna in 2010, line 2's eastern extension to Las Rosas opened in 2011, and line 9's northwestern end was extended further north in two stages: to Mirasierra in 2011 and to Paco de Lucía in 2015.

The network celebrated its 100th anniversary on 17 October 2019. Google commemorated this milestone with a Google Doodle.

In April 2025, line 3 started serving El Casar station in Getafe after a one-station extension from Villaverde Alto was opened, which ended a 10-year-long period without any new line extensions in the city. The station at El Casar forms an interchange with line 12, giving the latter a second direct interchange with the rest of the Metro network (beside the existing connection at Puerta del Sur with line 10).

== Lines ==
Unofficial diagram of the Madrid Metro network with lines shown to scale. (The three Metro Ligero lines are also included, shown with thin double lines.)

The Madrid Metro system has a total of thirteen lines in operation. totalling 241 stations and a length of 296.6 kilometres (184.3 mi). Twelve of these lines are designated with numbers from 1 to 12; the thirteenth line is a two-station shuttle known as Ramal Ópera–Príncipe Pío (Spanish for "Ópera–Príncipe Pío branch"), often shortened to just Ramal, and is instead designated on maps and journey planners with the letter R. All lines are self-contained: they operate independently of each other, with no shared track in revenue service.

Although for most of its history the Metro had only operated within the boundaries of the municipality of Madrid itself, this changed with the extension of line 9 into the municipalities of Rivas-Vaciamadrid and Arganda del Rey in 1999. Since then, many more routes have opened outside of Madrid's borders, and today nearly a third of the whole system is not located within the capital. The entire network is, however, located wholly within the larger Community of Madrid.

All lines, except for lines 6, 12 and the aforementioned Ramal, are broadly radial in nature, connecting Madrid's city centre with its surrounding suburbs and municipalities. Line 6 is a circular route which encircles the city's central area; as such, it is the busiest line on the whole network in terms of annual passenger numbers. Line 12 is also circular but, in stark contrast with the other lines, it does not run within Madrid's borders at all, instead circulating southwest of the capital and linking together the five cities of Móstoles, Alcorcón, Leganés, Getafe and Fuenlabrada. Two interchange stations – one in Alcorcón and one in Getafe – connect the line to the rest of the system.

Lines 7, 9 and 10, although officially treated as single lines and labelled as such on all maps and journey planners, are in fact operationally split into two sections each – these are respectively named 7A and 7B, 9A and 9B, and 10A and 10B when such distinctions are necessary. All in-service trains on these lines only travel within their own sections; passengers intending to travel between sections need to change trains at the designated changeover stations located in the outermost suburbs of Madrid (respectively Estadio Metropolitano, Puerta de Arganda and Tres Olivos), all of which feature cross-platform transfers. Routes 7A, 9A and 10A run through the city centre and operate similarly to the other radial lines of the network, while routes 7B, 9B and 10B run predominantly outside of the city where demand is much lower, and are therefore operated using shorter trainsets running at lower frequencies.

Similarly to several other metro networks around the world such as the London Underground or the New York City Subway, the Madrid Metro has been built with two distinct loading gauges:

- Lines 1–5 and the Ramal have a narrow loading gauge and, as such, are operated by smaller trainsets – each carriage is 2.3 metres (7 ft 7 in) wide and approximately 15 metres (49 ft 3 in) long, with three doors on each side. Lines 2, 4 and Ramal are operated using trains of four carriages; lines 1 and 3 were originally also built to accommodate four-car trains, but since their platforms were extended in the 1960s and the 2000s respectively, they are now served by trains of six carriages. Line 5 has been served by six-car sets since its opening.
- Lines 6–12 have a wide loading gauge and are served by larger trains, with each carriage having a width of 2.8 metres (9 ft 2 in) and a length of approximately 18 metres (59 ft 1 in), and four doors per side. All these lines have been built to accommodate trains of up to six carriages (except for lines 7B and 10B, which can hold up to five carriages). However, some lines are operated using shorter trainsets due to low demand: in particular, line 8 is served by four-car trains; line 10B sees a mixture of three- and four-car sets; lines 7B, 11 and 12 are operated with three-car trains; and line 9B has a mix of two- and three-car trains in service.

The full network is summarised in the table below:

Line	Termini	First section opened (Note: Denotes the date on which the first section of the existing line opened to the public. This does not necessarily coincide with the first time a particular line number was used.)	Last extended (Note: Denotes the date on which the newest section of track was opened to passengers on the line. It does not include new intermediate stations on existing sections of track.)	Length	Stations	Loading gauge	Platform length (Note: Denotes the standard platform length on a given line and, therefore, the length of the longest train that can operate on the line. Despite this, there are a handful of stations on some lines that are longer than given, for various reasons. In particular, all stations between La Elipa and Las Rosas (inclusive) on line 2 have platforms of 90 metres in length instead of 60 metres, as does Pinar de Chamartín on line 4. The platforms at Chamartín on line 1 are 110 metres long instead of 90 metres.)	Rolling stock (and carriage configuration) (Note: M = engine car with driver's cab (motor); S = engine car without cab (sin cabina); R = trailer car (remolque). A dot (·) between two letters represents lack of passageway between the two carriages; an absence of the dot indicates walk-through carriages. A number in front means that several separate units are coupled up to form one long trainset.)	Number of passengers (2024)
Line 1 (Madrid Metro)	Pinar de Chamartín – Valdecarros	17^{th} Oct; 1919	16^{th} May; 2007	23.9 km (14.9 mi)	33	narrow	90 m	2000-A (3×M·R)	107,206,331
Line 2 (Madrid Metro)	Cuatro Caminos – Las Rosas	14^{th} Jun; 1924	16^{th} Mar; 2011	14.0 km (8.7 mi)	20	narrow	60 m	3000 (MRSM)	44,677,061
Line 3 (Madrid Metro)	Moncloa – El Casar	9^{th} Aug; 1936	21^{st} Apr; 2025	17.5 km (10.9 mi)	19	narrow	90 m	3000 (MRSSRM)	75,203,140
Line 4 (Madrid Metro)	Argüelles – Pinar de Chamartín	17^{th} Sep; 1932 (Note: The route number 4 was not officially used until 23 March 1944 with the opening of the line between Argüelles and Goya. However, the line between Goya and Diego de León had been open since 17 September 1932. This section, initially a branch of line 2, was absorbed into line 4 in 1958.)	11^{th} Apr; 2007	16.0 km (9.9 mi)	23	narrow	60 m	3000 (MRSM)	42,325,479
Line 5 (Madrid Metro)	Casa de Campo – Alameda de Osuna	4^{th} Feb; 1961 (Note: The route number 5 was not officially used until 5 June 1968 with the opening of the line between Carabanchel and Callao. However, the line between Casa de Campo and Carabanchel (albeit initially without a station at Casa de Campo) had been open since 4 February 1961; this route was originally part of a larger Carabanchel–Chamartín de la Rosa Suburban Railway which operated independently of the Metro. The route between Aluche and Carabanchel was taken over by line 5 on 29 October 1976 and the section from Casa de Campo to Aluche went the same way on 22 October 2002.)	24^{th} Nov; 2006	23.2 km (14.4 mi)	32	narrow	90 m	2000-A (3×M·R); 2000-B (3×M·R); 3000 (MRSSRM)	77,282,116
Line 6 (Madrid Metro)	Circular	11^{th} Oct; 1979	10^{th} May; 1995	23.5 km (14.6 mi)	28	wide	110 m	8400 (MRSSRM)	116,054,842
Line 7 (Madrid Metro)	Line 7A: Pitis – Estadio Metropolitano; Line 7B: Estadio Metropolitano – Hospital del Henares	17^{th} Jul; 1974	11^{th} Feb; 2008	32.9 km (20.4 mi)	31	wide	Line 7A: 110 m Line 7B: 90 m	Line 7A: 9000 (MRSSRM); Line 7B: 9000 (MRM)	45,022,528
Line 8 (Madrid Metro)	Nuevos Ministerios – Aeropuerto T4	24^{th} Jun; 1998 (Note: The number 8 had been used prior to 1998, with the route between Nuevos Ministerios and Fuencarral utlilising this number between 10 June 1982 and 22 January 1998 when it was absorbed into line 10. The date of 24 June 1998 refers to the opening of the first section of the current line 8.)	3^{rd} May; 2007	16.5 km (10.3 mi)	8	wide	110 m	8000 (MRSM)	19,083,480
Line 9 (Madrid Metro)	Line 9A: Paco de Lucía – Puerta de Arganda; Line 9B: Puerta de Arganda – Arganda del Rey	30^{th} Jan; 1980	25^{th} Mar; 2015	39.5 km (24.5 mi)	29	wide	110 m	Line 9A: 5000 (3×M·M); 7000 (MRSSRM); 8000 (2×MRM); 9000 (MRSSRM); Line 9B: 6000 (MM or MRM)	42,129,991
Line 10 (Madrid Metro)	Line 10A: Puerta del Sur – Tres Olivos; Line 10B: Tres Olivos – Hospital Infanta Sofía	4^{th} Feb; 1961 (Note: The route between Casa de Campo and Plaza de España (albeit initially without a station at Casa de Campo) first opened on 4 February 1961; this route was originally part of a larger Carabanchel–Chamartín de la Rosa Suburban Railway (or simply "Suburbano"), which initially operated independently of the Metro. The Suburbano was eventually unified with the Metro network, and it was renamed to line 10 around 1981.)	26^{th} Apr; 2007	36.5 km (22.7 mi)	31	wide	Line 10A: 110 m Line 10B: 90 m	Line 10A: 7000 (MRSSRM); 9000 (MRSSRM); Line 10B: 8000 (MRM or MRSM)	83,903,484
Line 11 (Madrid Metro)	La Fortuna – Plaza Elíptica	6^{th} Nov; 1998	5^{th} Oct; 2010	8.5 km (5.3 mi)	7	wide	110 m	8000 (MRM); 9000 (MRM)	6,705,673
Line 12 (Madrid Metro)	Circular	11^{th} Apr; 2003	11^{th} Apr; 2003 (Note: There have been no extensions on the line since its opening.)	41.0 km (25.5 mi)	28	wide	110 m	8000 (MRM); 9000 (MRM)	46,506,382
Ramal (Madrid Metro)	Ópera – Príncipe Pío	26^{th} Dec; 1925	26^{th} Dec; 1925	1.1 km (0.7 mi)	2	narrow	60 m	3000 (MRSM)	4,496,561

In addition to the "conventional" (heavy-rail) Madrid Metro network, the city's metropolitan area also operates a system of light-rail lines known as Metro Ligero (Spanish for "Light Metro"), which are operated by trams. This system consists of two small disjointed networks and a total of three lines, numbered ML1, ML2 and ML3. All three lines opened in 2007. The system was built as a cost-effective extension to the Metro (albeit with its own distinct branding), in areas whose populations had not been deemed sufficient to financially justify the construction of new heavy-rail Metro routes. The three lines are also included on all official Madrid Metro network maps; they are depicted with thin double-lines, contrasting with thick solid lines used for the Metro network itself.

=== Service frequencies ===
Services on the Madrid Metro are in operation every day between 06:00 and 01:30. Under normal circumstances, all trains call at every intermediate station en route, and the majority of services operate along the full route from one end to the other (or continuously around the loop in the case of the circular lines 6 and 12); on lines 7, 9 and 10, which are split into their A and B sections, all services operate only within their section, but they too usually run from one end of the given section to the other.

All lines on the network operate with a frequent, "turn-up-and-go" level of service throughout most of the day, although the exact frequency depends on the line, time of day, and day of the week.

As of October 2026, the most intense service frequency on the network is provided during the morning rush hour on lines 3 and 10A, with trains approximately every 2-3 minutes each way, although all other lines see service frequencies of no less than every 4-6½ minutes during this time. During weekday off-peak periods and for most of the day on weekends, trains on most lines operate approximately every 4-7 minutes per direction; services are less frequent on lines 11 and 12, with intervals of 7-8 minutes, and less frequent still on line 9B, where they run every 10-12 minutes. Services on all lines are reduced in the late evenings: after about midnight, trains generally run every 15 minutes each way on all lines (except for line 9B, where they run every 22-23 minutes), although additional late services run on some lines on Friday and Saturday evenings.

== Operators ==
With the exception of line 9B (the section of line 9 between Puerta de Arganda and Arganda del Rey stations), the entire Madrid Metro network is owned and operated directly by Metro de Madrid S.A., a public enterprise owned by the Government of the Community of Madrid. Line 9B is instead operated by Transportes Ferroviarios de Madrid (TFM) – a consortium comprising Metro de Madrid S.A. and a small group of private companies – through a 30-year-long concession that ends in 2029.

== Infrastructure ==
=== Tunnels ===
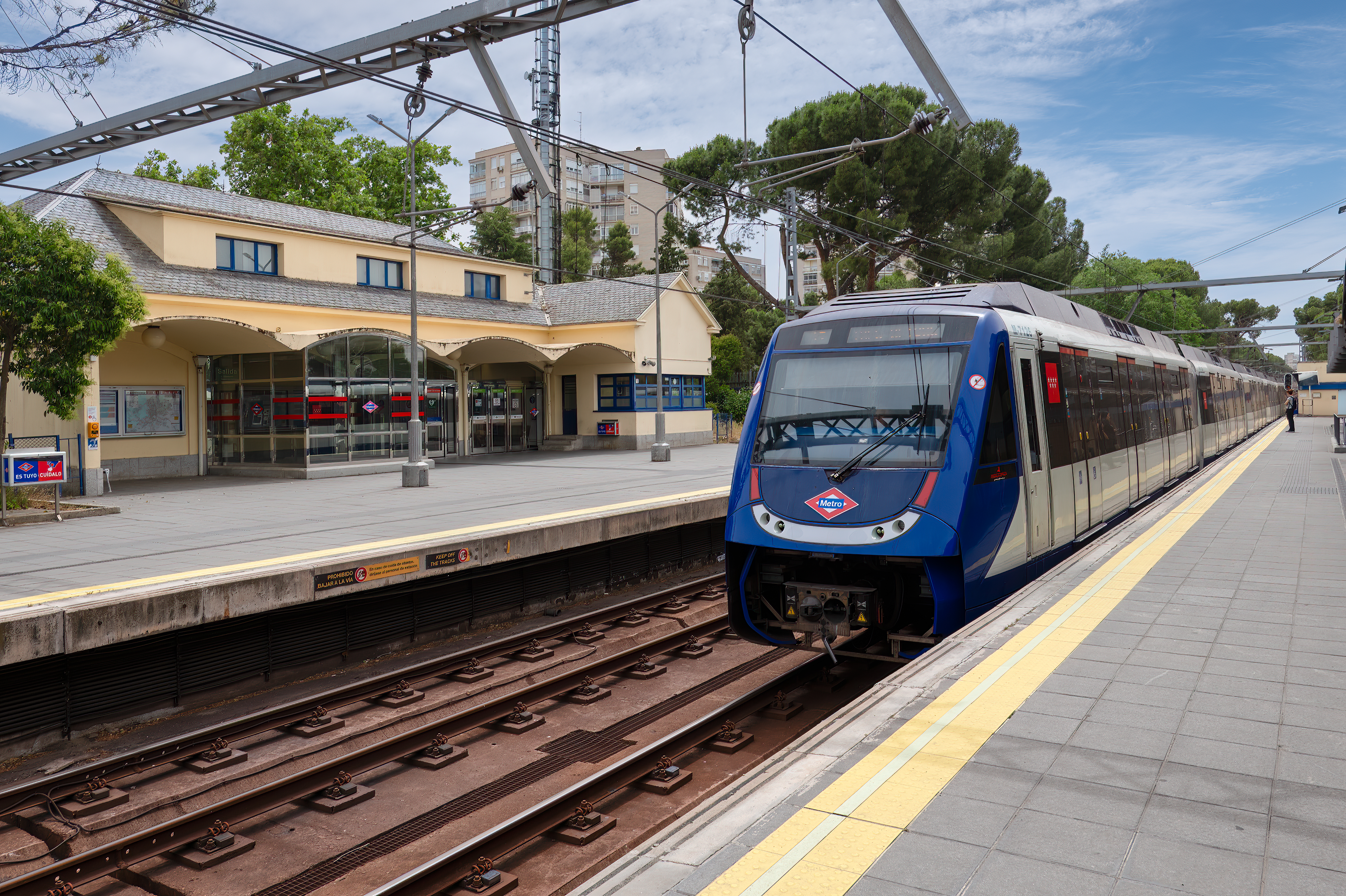
Batán station on line 10 is one of only seven stations on the network not located in tunnels.

The vast majority of the network is located underground. The most notable exception to this is line 9B between Puerta de Arganda and Arganda del Rey, almost all of which runs on the surface (although most of the stations themselves are located in tunnels: only Rivas Vaciamadrid and La Poveda stations are out in the open). Aside from line 9B, there are only three short sections of track that do not run below ground level: line 5 through Empalme and Aluche stations, line 10 through Batán and Lago stations, and the northeastern end of line 8 at Aeropuerto T4 station which runs under the terminal building.

The tunnels on lines 1–5 and the Ramal are generally narrower than those on lines 6–12; as a consequence, the Madrid Metro has two distinct loading gauges (see rolling stock below).

=== Electrification system ===
Map of electrification voltages used on the Metro and Metro Ligero networks: Orange: 600 V; Brown: 600 V (futureproofed for 1,500 V); Green: 1,500 V. (The pink colour represents 750 V, used only on Metro Ligero.)

All lines of the Madrid Metro are electrified using overhead power supply. Until 1999, this power supply was exclusively in the form of a standard catenary wire hung from overhead gantries at regular intervals; however, since then, Metro de Madrid has instead begun replacing the wires with a rigid overhead rail across all the underground sections of the network. This rail is hung directly from the ceiling of the tunnels instead of from gantries; Metro de Madrid claims that its rigidity makes it less prone to wear and damage and requires less maintenance. As of February 2026, the powered rail is used on all the tunnelled sections of the Metro system, except on most of line 9 where the catenary is yet to be replaced.

The network is powered using direct current at either 600 V (lines 1, 4, 5 and 9) or 1500 V (all other lines). (Note: The reference, dating from 2014, additionally includes line 6 on its list of lines powered at 600 V; however, this line has been upgraded to 1500 V since then.) Metro de Madrid has long-term plans to have the remaining four lines converted to the more efficient 1500 V system as well, and all of them except for line 9 are already prepared for a future conversion.

=== Track layout ===
The network has a track gauge of 1,445 mm (4 ft 8 7/8 in) and – unlike most railway lines in Spain where trains run on the right – it operates with trains always running on the left-hand track. The first lines were built and operated this way to match Madrid's road traffic, which drove on the left when the network first opened in 1919. To avoid additional costs associated with signalling changes, the left-hand running was maintained on the network even after road traffic across Spain was standardised to drive on the right in 1924; newer lines built after that date also kept this system to maintain unity across the network.

On each line of the Metro, almost all intermediate stations are built with two platform tracks, one for each direction of travel. The only exceptions are the two changeover stations between sections A and B of lines 7 and 10, both of which have extra tracks (respectively, Estadio Metropolitano has four tracks, while Tres Olivos has three), although typically only two tracks are in passenger use at both stations.

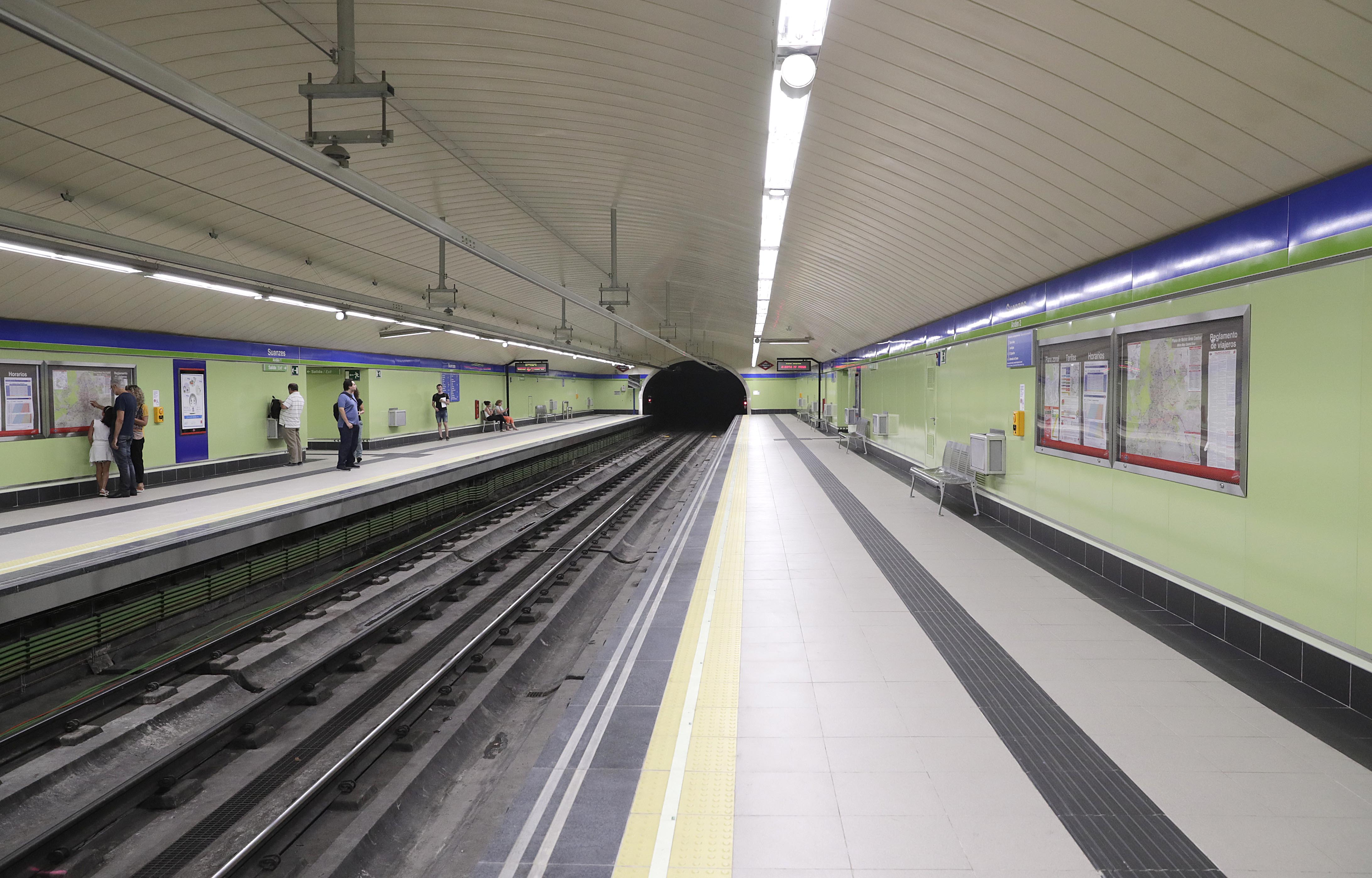
The side platforms of Suanzes station on line 5

Terminus stations are usually also built with two tracks; in these cases, either only one track is in regular use, thus leaving the other platform out of service, or – if reversing sidings have been built beyond the terminus – one platform can be used for boarding and the other for alighting. The only termini that do not have two tracks are: Casa de Campo on line 5 and Ópera on the Ramal, both of which have only one track.

=== Platform layout ===
The majority of stations on the Metro are built with two side platforms, meaning that the vehicles open their doors on the left-hand side.

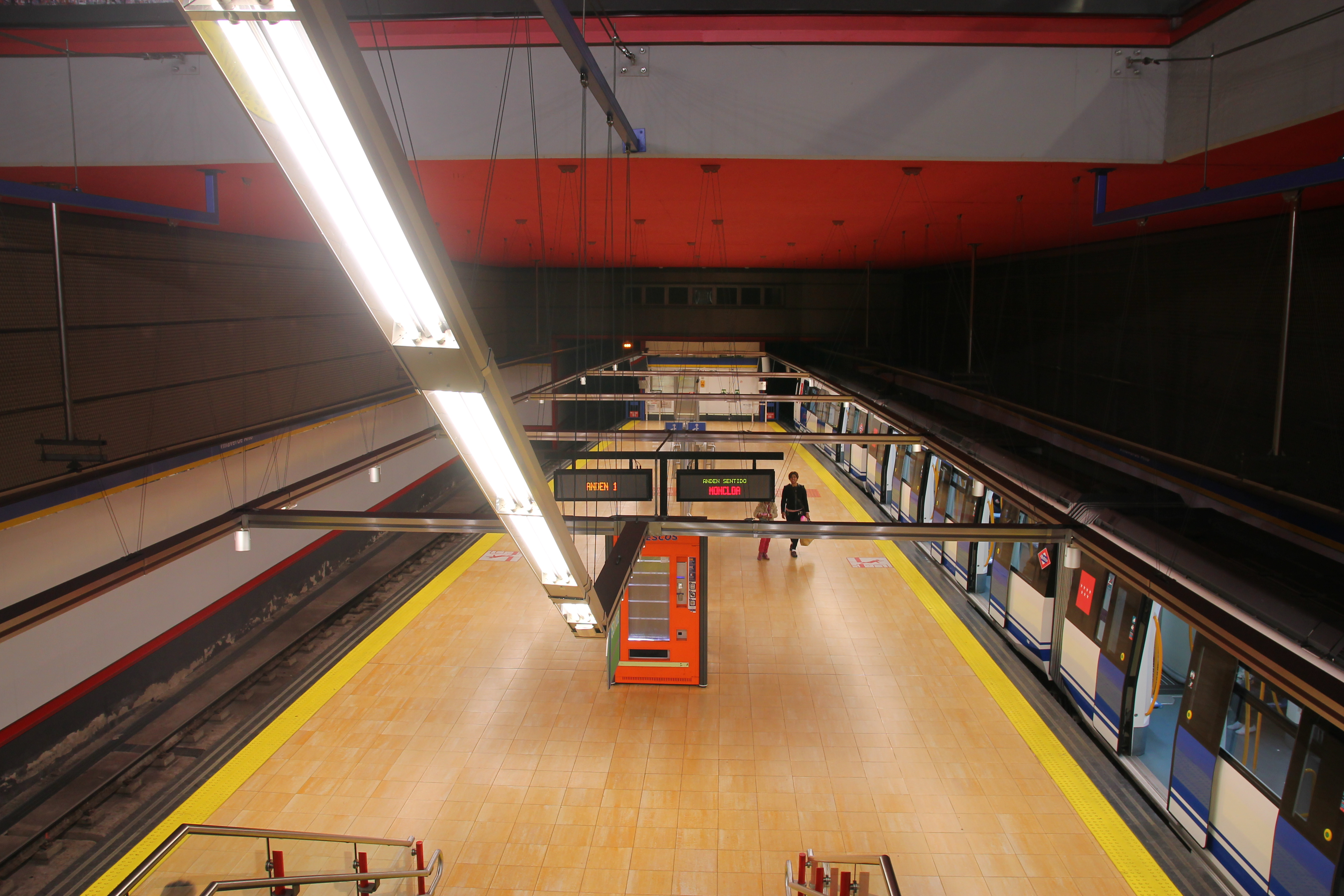
The island platform of Villaverde Alto station on line 3

A small number of stations instead have a single central island platform between the two tracks, shared by both directions of travel. This layout is rare across the network, with only eight such stations: Almendrales and Villaverde Alto on line 3; Aluche on line 5; Feria de Madrid and Aeropuerto T4 on line 8; Rivas Urbanizaciones and Arganda del Rey on line 9; and Joaquín Vilumbrales on line 10. At these stations, the trains open their doors on the right-hand side instead of the usual left-hand side.

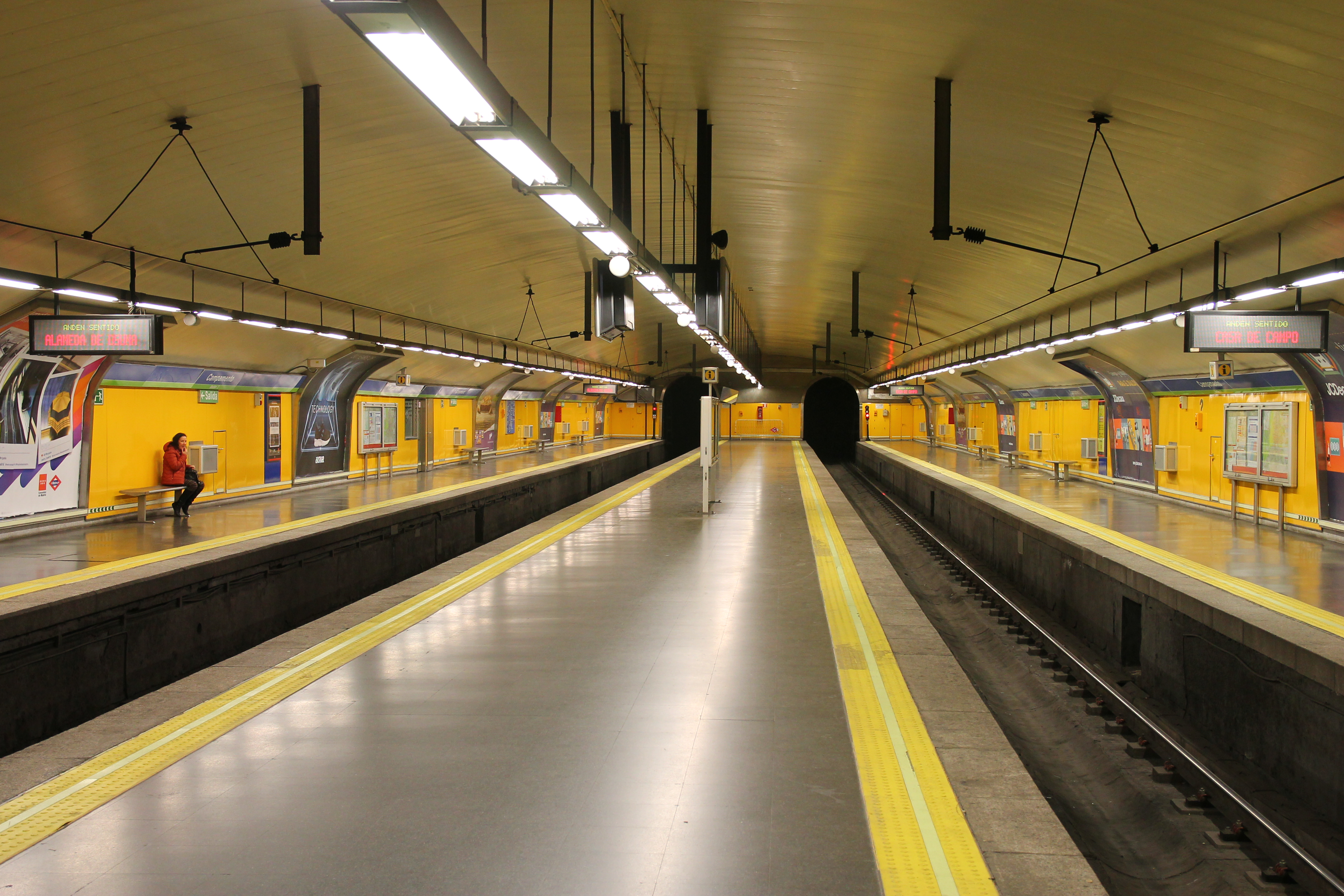
The Spanish solution platforms of Campamento station on line 5

In addition, eleven stations on the network have both two side platforms and a central island platform (a layout known as the Spanish solution). Seven of these stations are on line 6 (Avenida de América, Manuel Becerra, Sainz de Baranda, Pacífico, Plaza Elíptica, Oporto and Laguna); the other stations with this layout are: Miguel Hernández on line 1, Campamento on line 5, (Note: Carabanchel station on line 5 was also built with this layout, but the central platform is permanently out of service.) and Avenida de América and Pueblo Nuevo on line 7. Trains that stop at these stations open their doors on both sides; theoretically, the side platforms are primarily dedicated for boarding the train and the island platform is for alighting, but in practice, passengers may board and disembark on either side. Moreover, step-free access at these stations, if available at all, is generally only possible on one side (in particular, Avenida de América, Plaza Elíptica, Laguna and Miguel Hernández stations have lifts on the side platforms, while Sainz de Baranda, Pacífico and Pueblo Nuevo stations have a lift on the central platform), so alighting passengers who require level access need to ensure to get off the train through the correct set of doors.

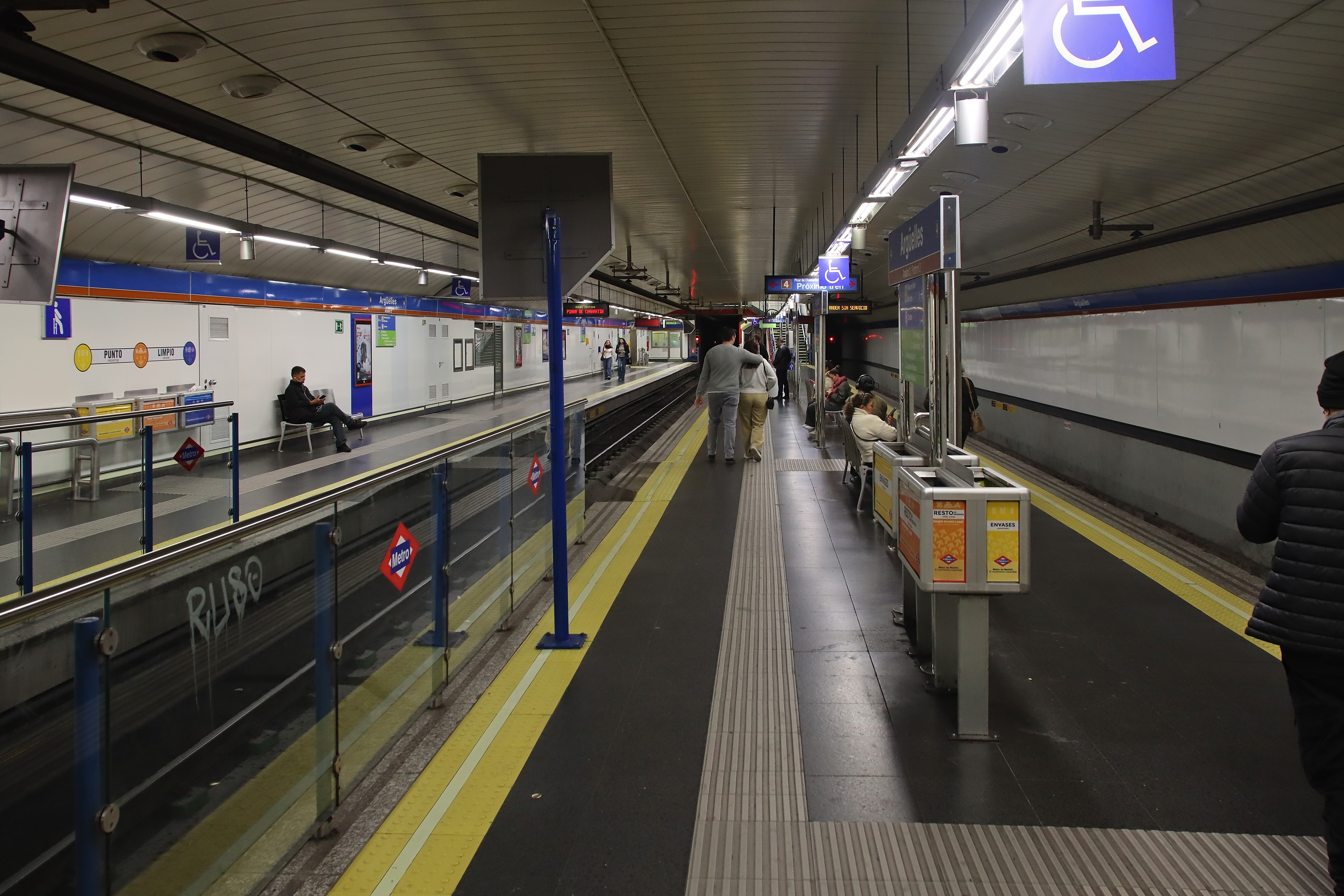
One island platform and one side platform of Argüelles station on line 4

There are also three stations that feature a "half-Spanish" solution: i.e., one central platform and one additional side platform for only one of the two tracks. Two such stations are termini of lines 2 and 4 (Cuatro Caminos and Argüelles, respectively). The other station with this layout is Puerta de Arganda, which is the interchange between sections A and B on line 9; at this station, trains on line 9A typically use the track with the side platform (and open doors on both sides), while trains on line 9B serve the other track.

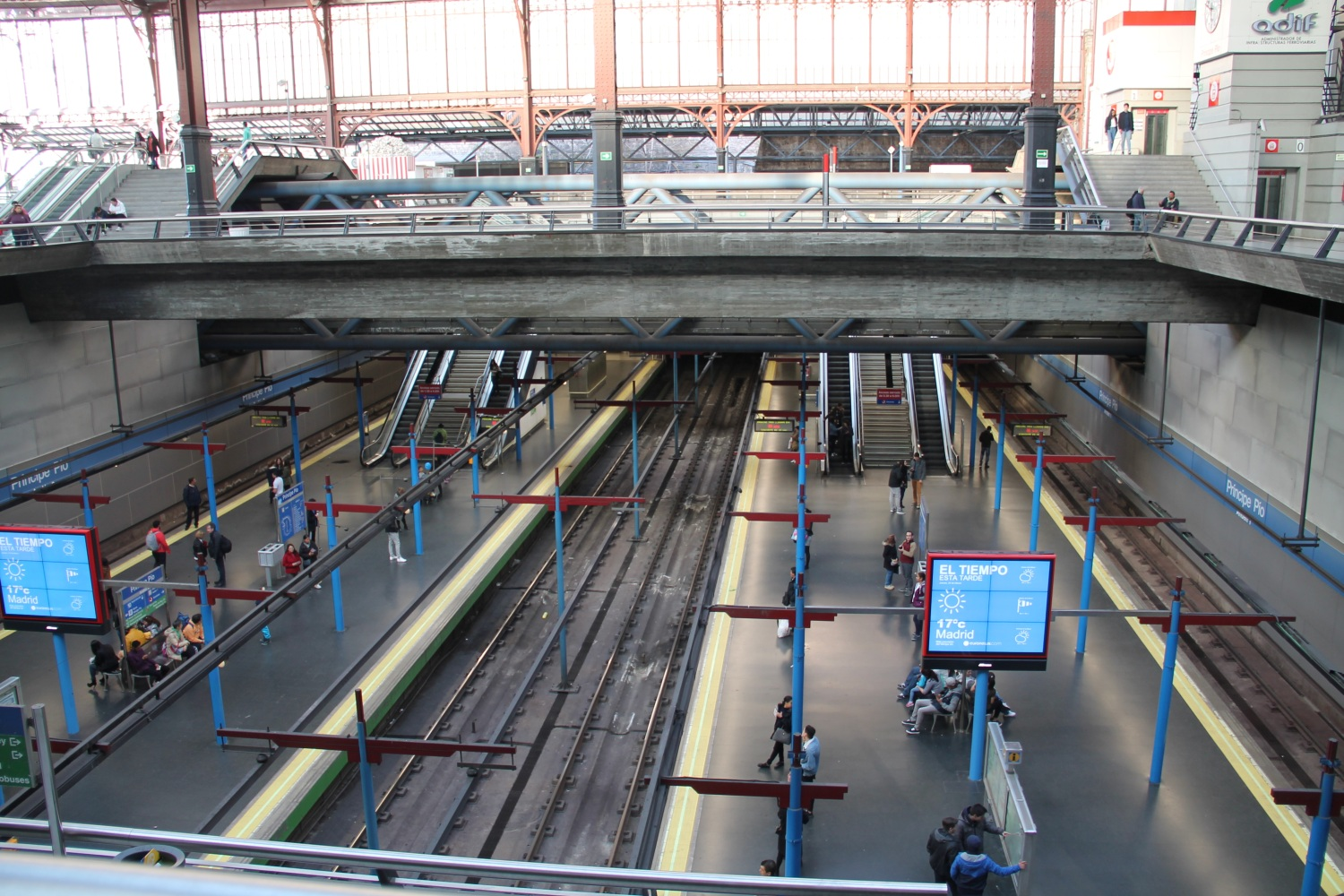
The two island platforms of Príncipe Pío station that form a cross-platform interchange between lines 6 (inner tracks) and 10 (outer tracks)

Finally, two stations on the network have been designed for cross-platform interchange, with two parallel island platforms each serving two different lines. Both such stations are located on line 10, and in both cases line 10 uses the outer pair of tracks, meaning that trains open their doors on the right. The two stations are: Príncipe Pío, where the inner pair of tracks are on line 6, and Casa de Campo, where the single inner track (with platforms on both sides) is the terminus of line 5. Additionally, cross-platform transfers are also possible at the aforementioned A/B interchange stations on lines 7, 9 and 10, as well as at Pinar de Chamartín between lines 1 and 4. (Note: At Pinar de Chamartín station, the two lines are parallel to each other, with four tracks featuring an island platform shared between the two inner tracks and two side platforms for the outer tracks. The station was designed such that both lines could be extended in the future; in theory, one pair of tracks is for line 1 while the other pair is for line 4, but since both lines currently terminate at the station, all trains on both lines simply use the inner two tracks, thus offering cross-platform transfers.)

=== Station design ===
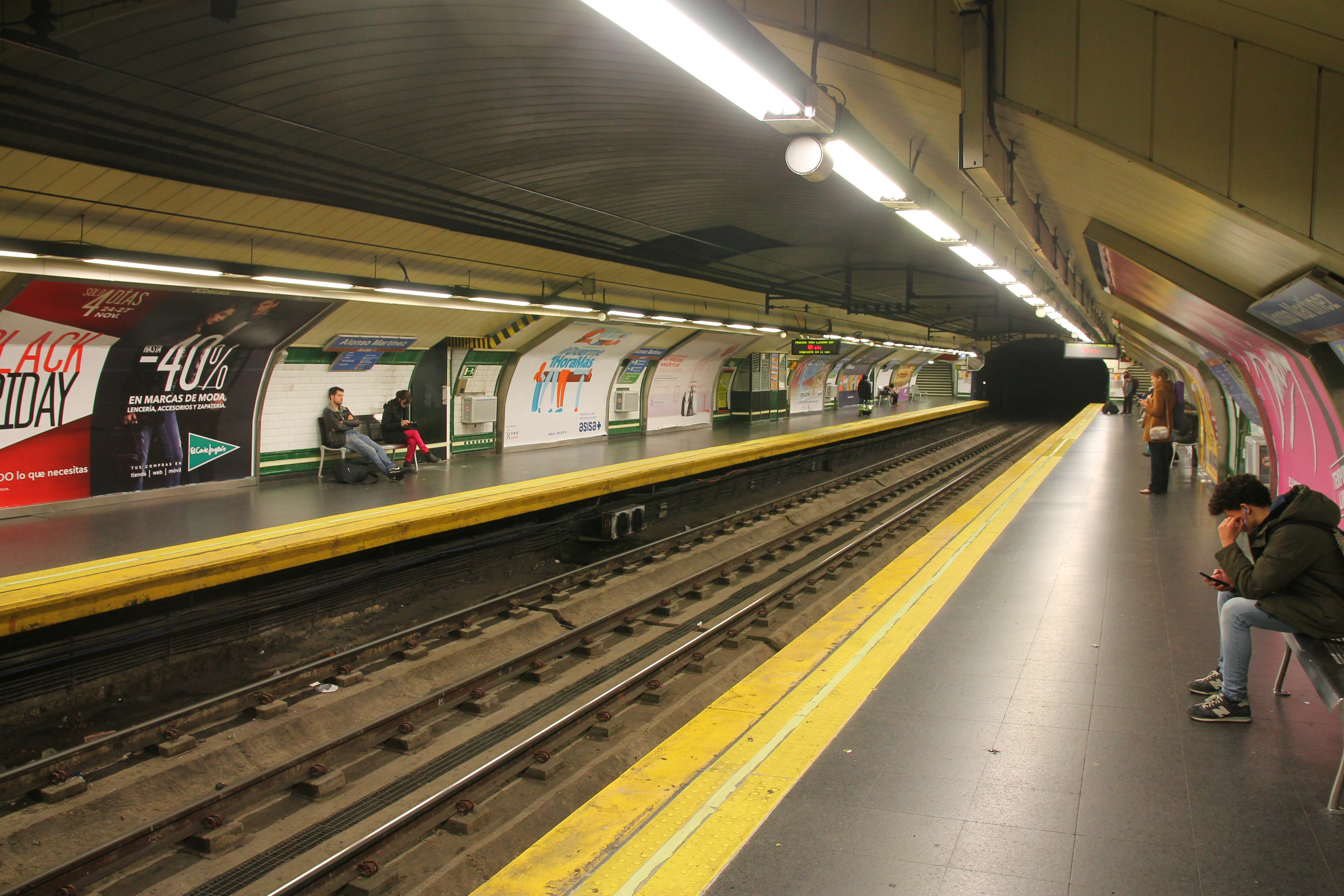
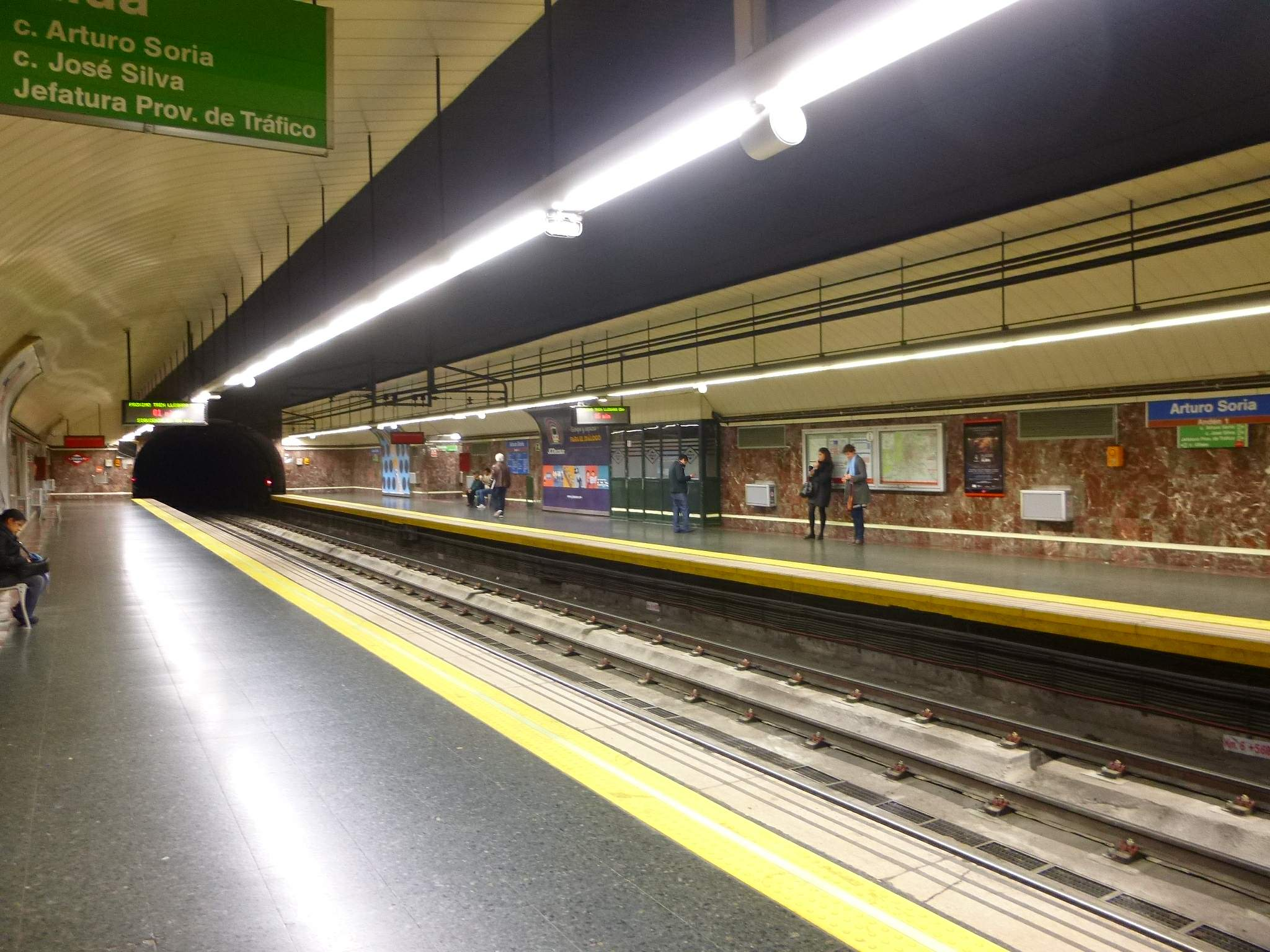
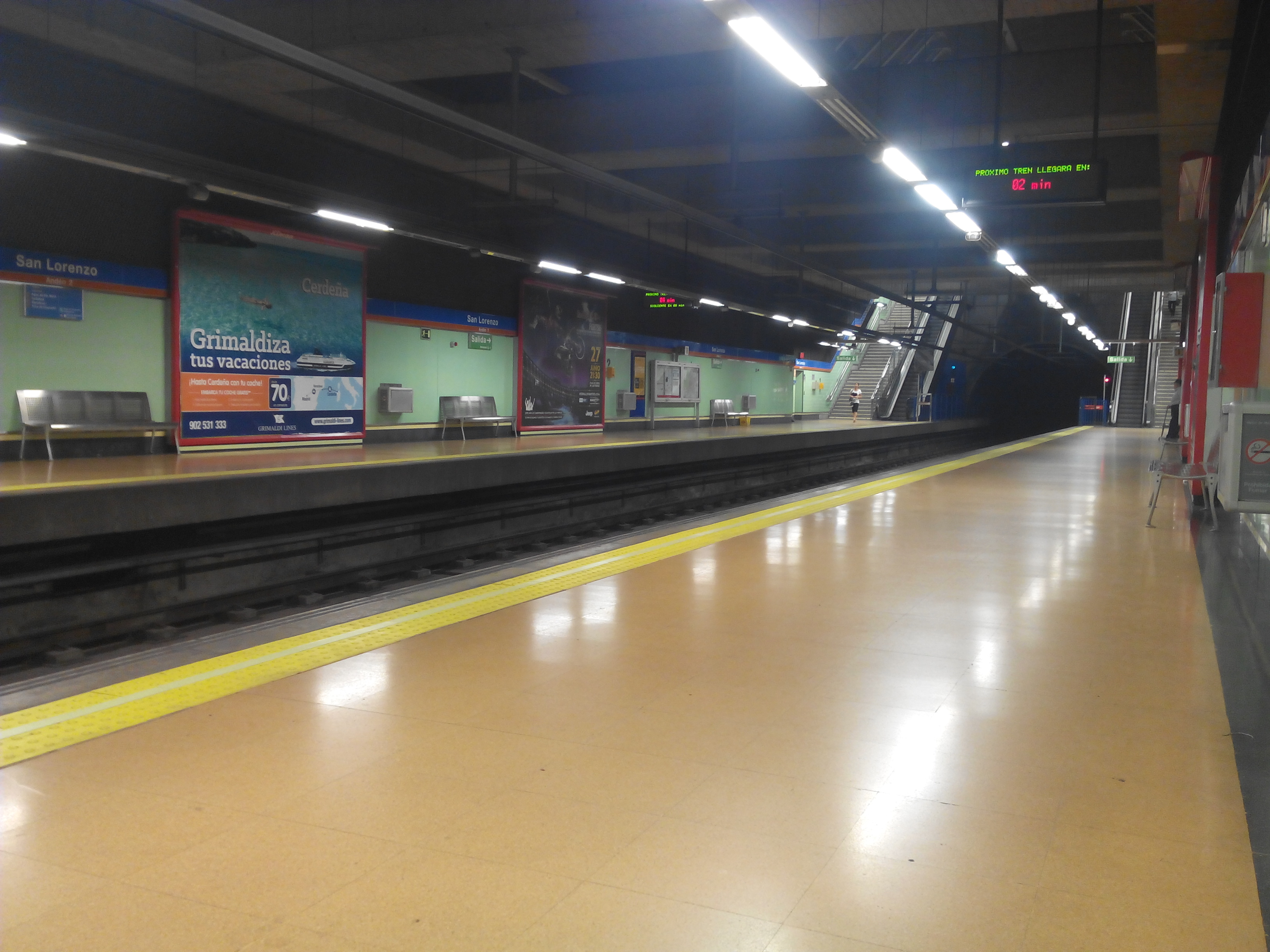
Three stations on line 4: Alonso Martínez (built in 1944), Arturo Soria (built in 1979) and San Lorenzo (built in 1998), showing the different design standards over the years.

Very few stations on the Madrid Metro network have a dedicated station building. With a handful of exceptions, station buildings can only be found at some Metro stops that form interchanges with mainline railway stations, as well as at the few Metro stations that are not underground. On the rest of the network, the station entrances are in the form of stairs, lifts and/or escalators built directly in the middle of a pedestrian area. Newer stations typically additionally cover their entrances with glazed shelters, while the entrances to older stations are usually open to the elements.

At platform level, the age of many stations is evident by their design. The oldest stations, built before the 1970s, are often compact and have curved platform walls with white bevelled tiles, similarly to some old-style stations on the Paris Métro. Stations built between the late 1970s and early 1990s have partially vertical platform walls and are somewhat more spacious than their earlier counterparts; a common element between many of these stations was that the walls were covered in brown or cream-coloured tiles. On the other hand, stations built after that period were constructed with space in mind, with wide platforms, natural-like lighting, ample entryways and fully vertical platform walls. The walls are also covered in plastic panels of a single bright colour; the exact colour depends on the station (some colours used on the system include white, light-green, light-blue, yellow, orange and red). Some older stations have also been retrofitted with these coloured panels during recent refurbishment.

=== Accessibility ===
As of February 2026, there are a total of 579 lifts on the Madrid Metro network.

Of the 291 stations on the network (counted separately for each line), over 70% are wheelchair-accessible. Five of the thirteen lines (3, 8, 11, 12 and the Ramal) have step-free access at all their stations. At the opposite end of the spectrum, the least accessible lines on the network are line 4 and line 5, on which less than half of the stations offer step-free access (11 out of 23 and 11 out of 32 stations, respectively).

== Rolling stock ==
Traditionally, the trains operating in the Madrid Metro have been built and supplied by the Spanish company Construcciones y Auxiliar de Ferrocarriles (CAF). This was particularly true under Francisco Franco's dictatorship, due to the politic of autarky his administration initially pursued. However, despite CAF still working for the Metro, in recent years the Italian AnsaldoBreda has also provided trains for the wide-profile lines.

Every rolling unit in the Madrid Metro has a unique ID that singles it out in the whole network. Those IDs are grouped by the rolling unit model (the "series") and thus is used to categorize the trains, as they bear no user-visible statement of the model specified by the manufacturer. An ID is made up of:

- A letter indicating the type of rolling unit: M for a car with both engines and driver's cabin (Spanish Motor), R for an engineless car, with or without drivers cabin (Spanish Remolque) and S for a cabinless car with engines (Spanish motor Sin cabina).
- A dash separating the two components
- A three or four digit number indicating the unit's series and the position within it. Usually, the series is indicated by the thousands and hundreds (i.e. 5281 indicates a series 5000, subseries 200 train).

=== Trainsets currently in use ===
==== Narrow profile ====
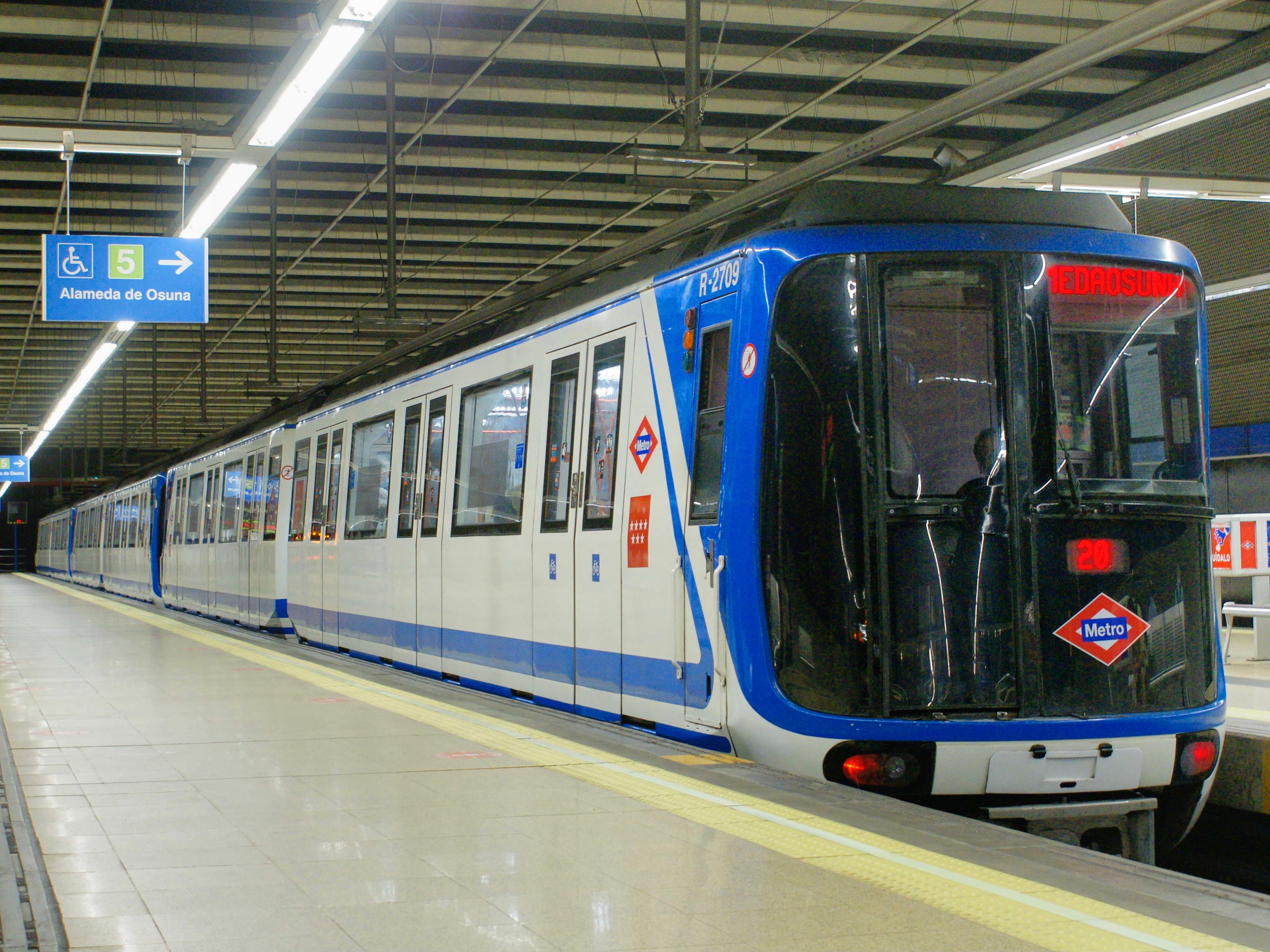
A series 2000-B "bubble" metro train on line 5 at Casa de Campo station

CAF series 2000: This series has two separate sub-series usually called A and B. The first batch, while reliable and practical, was extremely "box-like" in its looks. They are nicknamed 'Pandas', after a car by Seat with the same name and similar boxy design. In contrast, the B sub-series train sets can be told apart by its sleeker, rounder forms, which has granted them the nickname of "bubble" (burbuja) for their round driver cabin window. Series 2000A are currently the more numerous in the network: 530 cars (Note: Trainset sizes vary between lines: 90m lines use six cars per train, while 60m lines use only four. Thus the actual number of trains varies between 88 and 132.) were built and delivered between 1985 and 1993, having serviced every narrow profile line. They are also among the oldest stock in operation in the Madrid Metro. The most reliable ones are being refurbished and painted with new, lighter colours like the ones used in Series 3000. Series 2000B were delivered in lesser numbers (about 126 cars) between 1997 and 1998, with the inclusion of air conditioning and station announcements through pre-recorded voice messages and LED displays. They are currently used in line 5, with no plans for retirement.

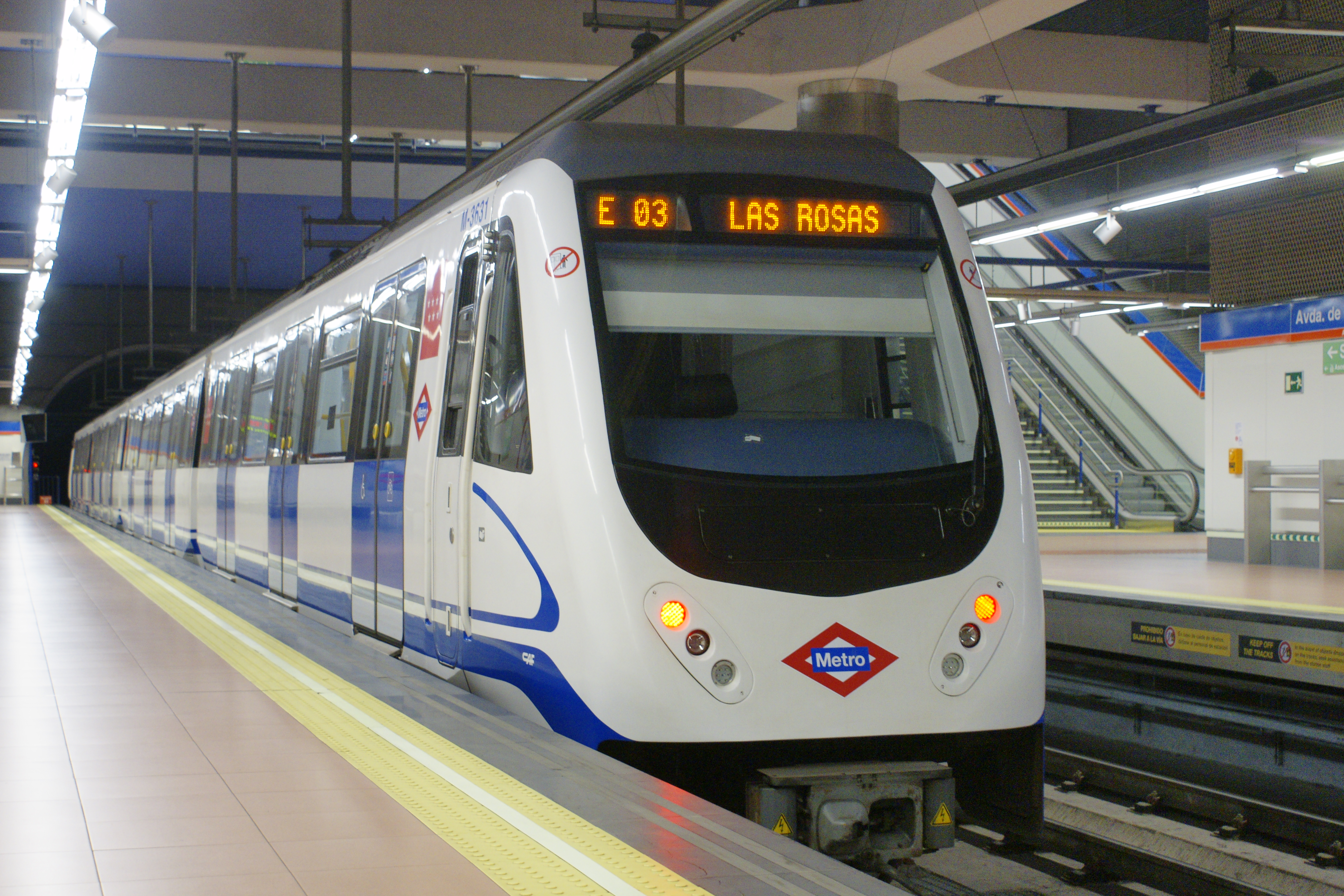
A series 3000 train arriving at Avenida de Guadalajara station on line 2.

CAF series 3000: The newest of the narrow line trainsets, series 3000 were commissioned for the reopening of line 3 after its complete renewal in the early 2000s. Their constituent subunits can be completely joined through crossable articulations, making it possible to go from the head to the tail without actually exiting the train. This has earned them the nickname of "boa", a term usually applied in Spain to double-length buses with such joints. They are currently servicing lines 2, 3, 4, 5 and the Ramal. Series 3000 trains look rather like a narrowed version of series 8000, while the interior uses mainly yellow and light-blue tones.

==== Wide profile ====
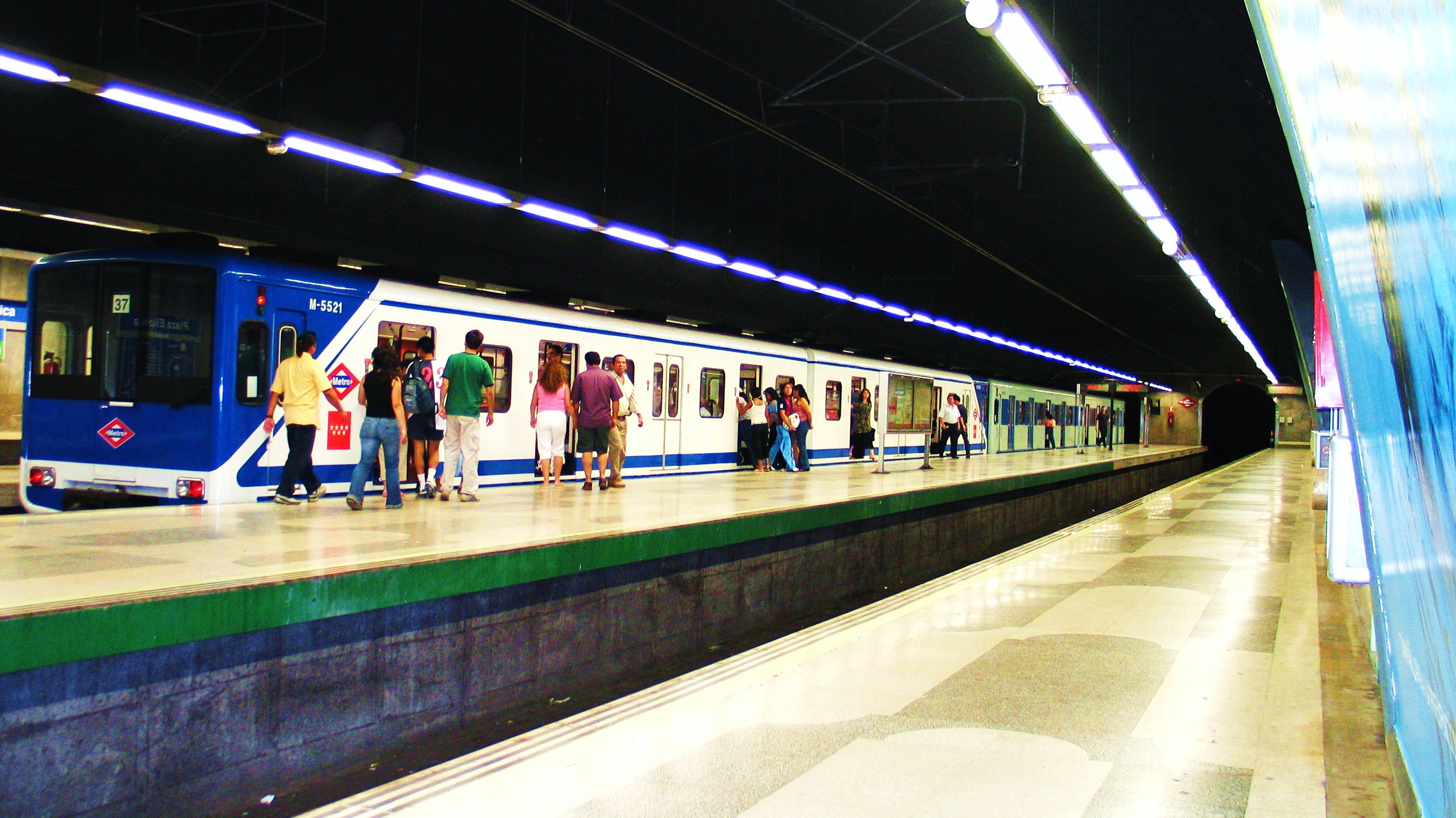
A series 5000 train at Plaza Elíptica station on line 6.

CAF series 5000: Currently servicing line 9 and occasionally line 6, this model has had a long history: the first trainsets were delivered in 1974 for the newly opened, first wide-profile line 7, while the latest subseries, 5500, of which 24 trainsets of 6 cars each were built, entered service in 1993. They were the last to use the old, square "box-like" design from CAF, which was already becoming unpopular for its exaggerate priming of effectiveness versus aesthetics. The first iteration featured a wood lookalike coating for the inner walls and a novel seat distribution in two-seat rows perpendicular to the train walls, making them look not unlike older regional trains. Subseries 5100–5200 returned to the traditional seating along the train walls, but still included another feature from the first iteration, automatic opening of all the gates in the train. The final subseries, 5500, has a distinct, darker color scheme and returns to the usual on-demand opening of train gates with a button on each one. Being the oldest rolling stock in operation in the wide profile lines, many cars were retired or sold to the Buenos Aires Underground for operation on line B to make up for shortfalls on the line following extensions.

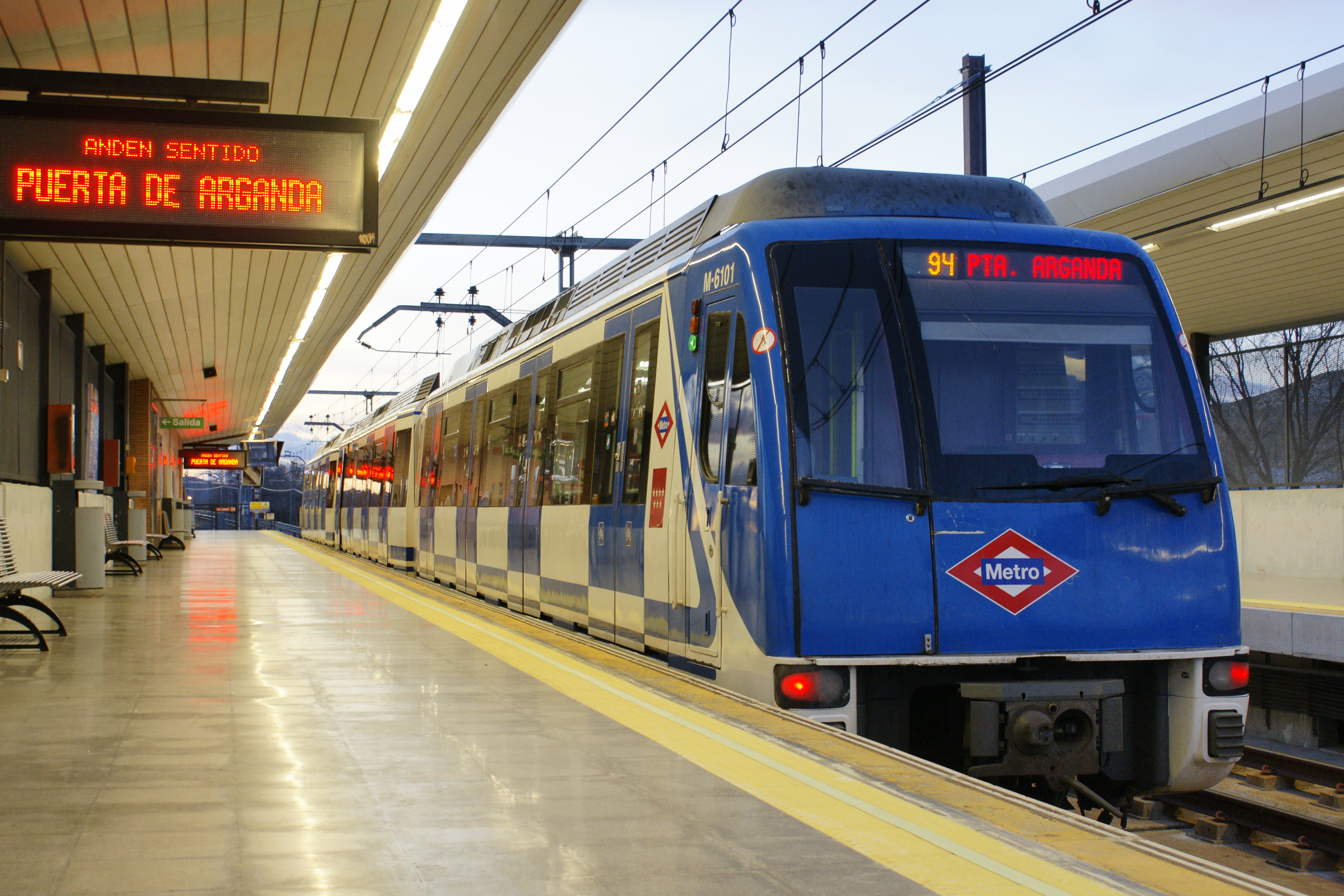
A series 6000 train at La Poveda station on line 9

CAF series 6000: This model, of which 29 trainsets were built and delivered in 1998, was the first by CAF to feature a new, sleeker and rounder design. As it was to serve TFM, the stretch of line 9 connecting Madrid to Arganda del Rey (the first extension of the Metro network outside Madrid proper), its interior resembles the regional Cercanías trains more closely than any other Metro trains: compact seats in couples set perpendicularly to the train walls, more places to grasp in case of a sudden brake/acceleration, etc. They were also the first to include luminous panels stating their destination, as the line they service was effectively split in two stretches, and travellers had to switch trains at Puerta de Arganda. Finally, they primed the "boa train" layout, but the walkable aisle only spanned two cars, while a trainset would usually carry 4 or 6. These trains are equipped with automatic train protection (ATP) and automatic train operation (ATO). Series 6000 is currently doing service on line 9B. In 2013, 73 of the 108 cars ordered were sold to Buenos Aires for operation on line B of the metro system; the sale totalled €32.6 million for the retirement of Japanese-built units, with a further 13 cars ordered at a later date. These trains have been widely criticised in Argentina, and been called the worst purchase in the history of the Buenos Aires Underground.

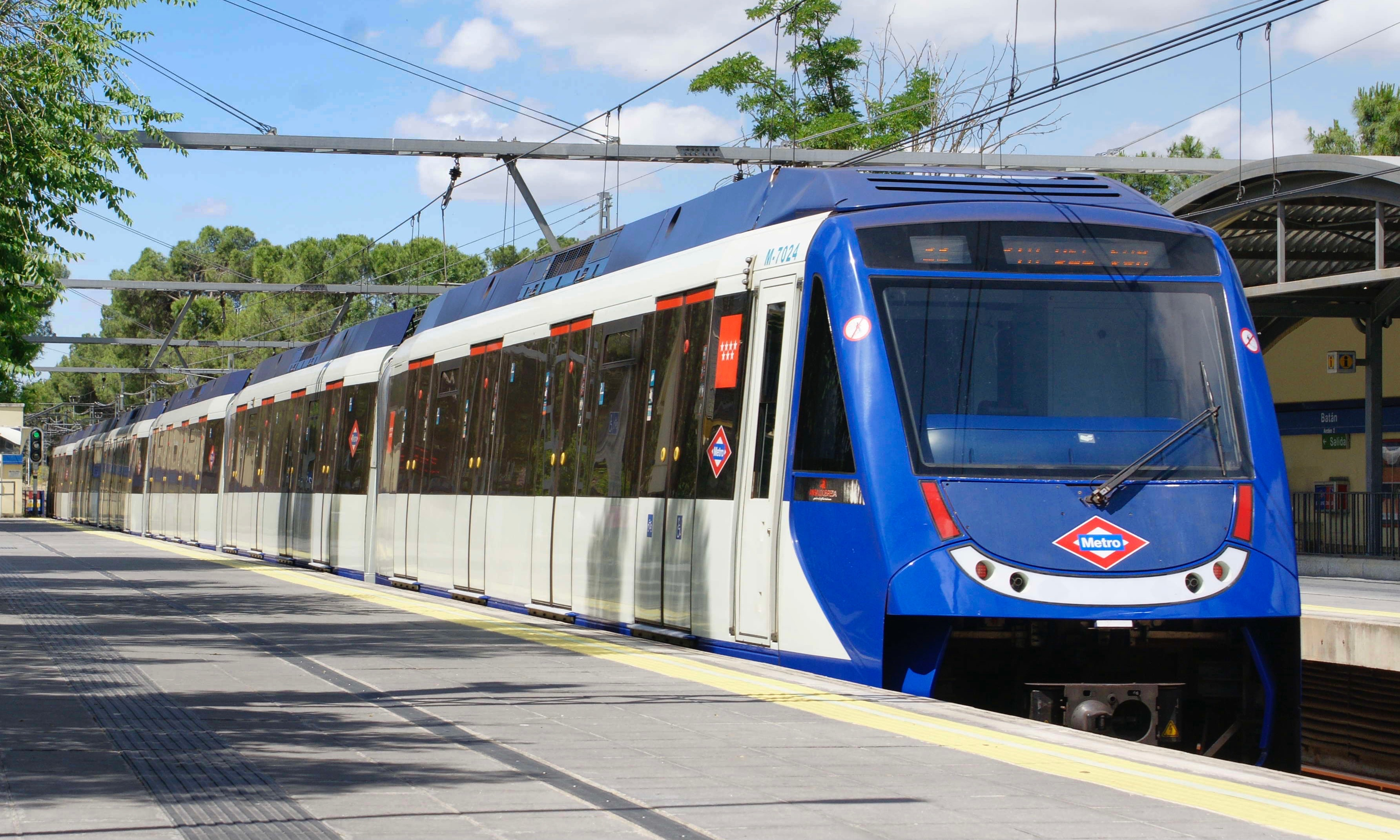
A series 7000 train at Batán station on line 10

Ansaldobreda series 7000 & 9000: The first purchase to a manufacturer other than CAF, and to a non-Spanish dealer, 37 series 7000 trainsets service the extremely busy line 10. They were the first in the network to feature a full "boa" layout, allowing commuters to traverse the whole six cars. They are extremely functional, with ample 1.3m doors and a sleek, unobtrusive design for a total capacity of 1,260 people per trainset (180 seated). This model also features two TV screens in each car, but they are left unused, both regularly or in emergencies. Series 9000 trains are similar to their previous incarnation, but include better accessibility for disabled people and more safety measures, such as visual and auditive warnings for the train gates and more effective emergency brakes, they also brought small aesthetic changes like the removal of the wood effect from the ceiling and the change of the red top stripe of the doors to a blue color. Series 7000 currently service the main part of line 10 from Puerta del Sur to Tres Olivos and occasionally on line 9; while series 9000 comprise the main fleet of lines 7 and 12, occasionally on line 10, and on line 9 to cover for the sold 6000s.

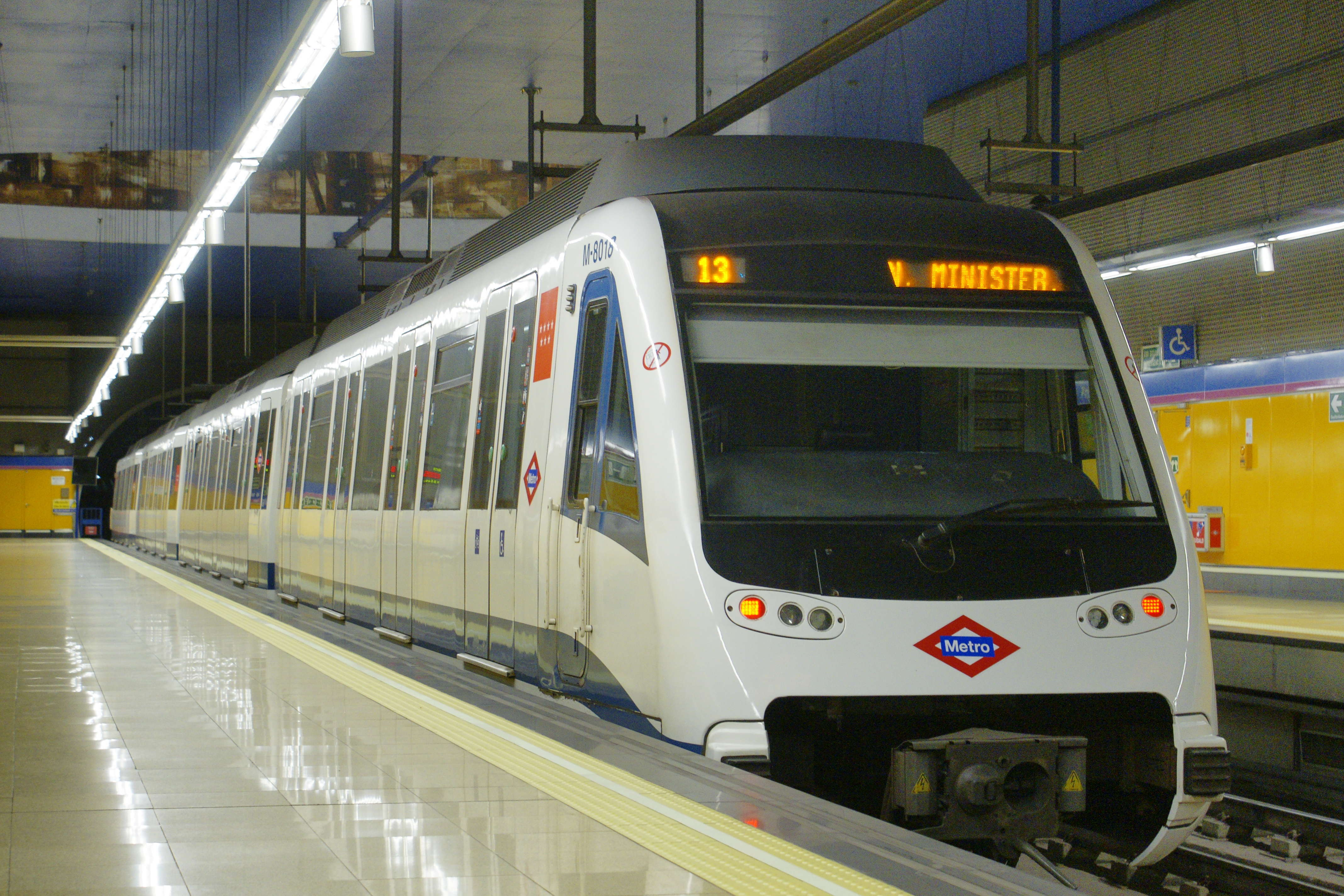
A series 8000 train waiting on line 8 at Pinar del Rey station

CAF series 8000: Originally designed for line 12, 45 trainsets were built and delivered by CAF in 2002. Each one is composed of three cars or four cars joined in the "boa" layout, with the three car version servicing line 12 and the four car version servicing line 8 as-is, while lines 9 and 10 use pairs of such trainsets to form a MRM-MRM configuration for a maximum of 1,070 passengers (144 seated). The interior distribution is rather like that of series 7000, with a bigger clear area (i.e. without seating) in the first car for people carrying luggage to/from the airport and disabled people in wheelchairs. Like the narrower series 3000 trainsets, its bogies are insonorized and feature a hybrid rubber-pneumatic suspension system. Series 8000 primed the introduction of regenerative braking in the Madrid Metro. The system reverses the normal circuit of the electric motors when braking, thus making the deceleration return power to the network. Also, they feature the now-standard informative panels and gate activity warnings in the interior. A second batch was ordered for line 11 to replace the series 3000 operating on the line since the extension of the line to La Fortuna in 2010. The original batch currently services lines 12 and 8, while also providing rush hour support to lines 9 and 10 while the second batch currently services line 11.

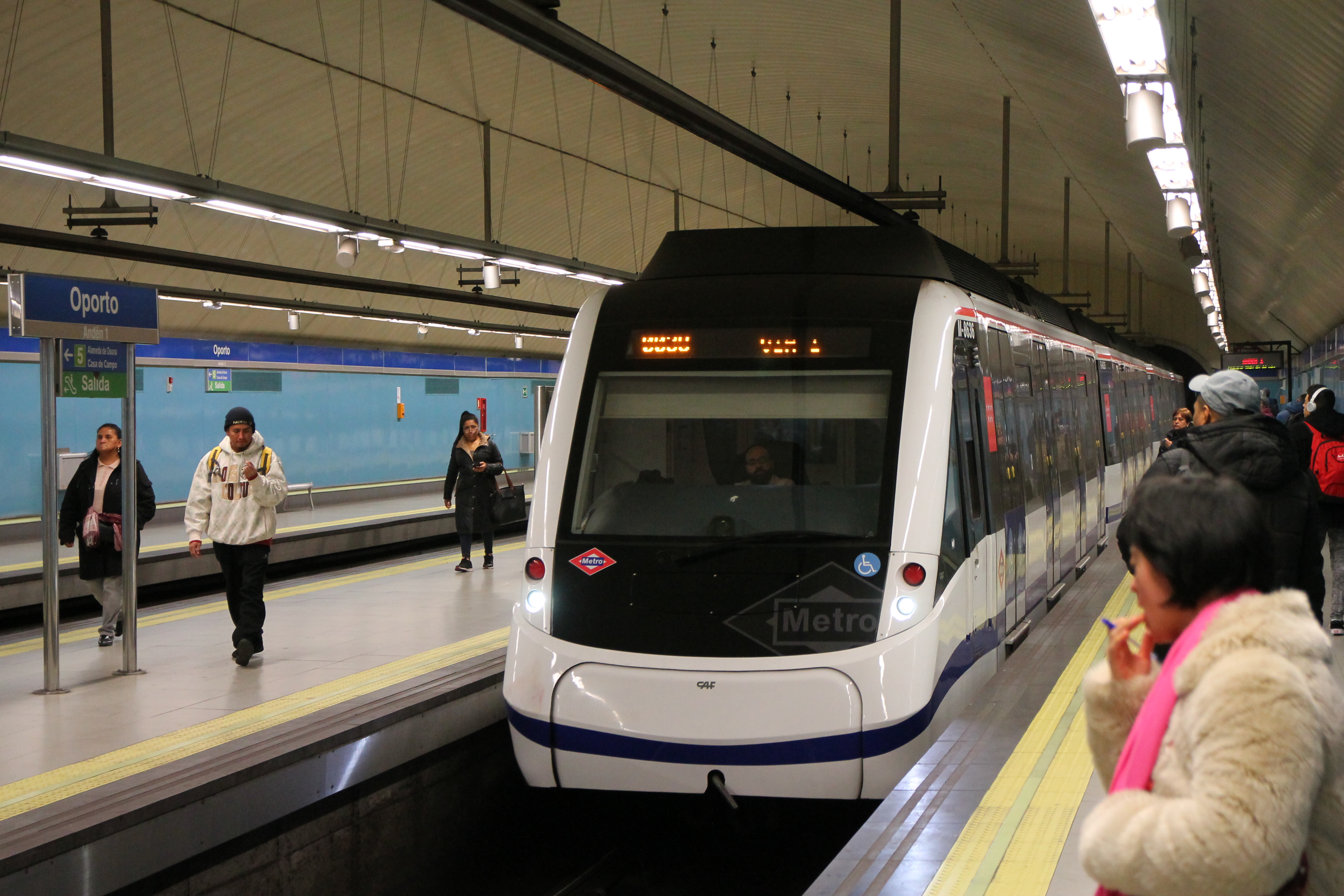
A series 8400 train at Oporto station on line 6

CAF series 8400: Derived from the recent series 8000 trains, the 8400 series are the newest train type to enter service on the Madrid Metro on line 6 since 2010 to complement the older series 5000 serving on that line. It currently services line 6.

=== Historic rolling stock ===
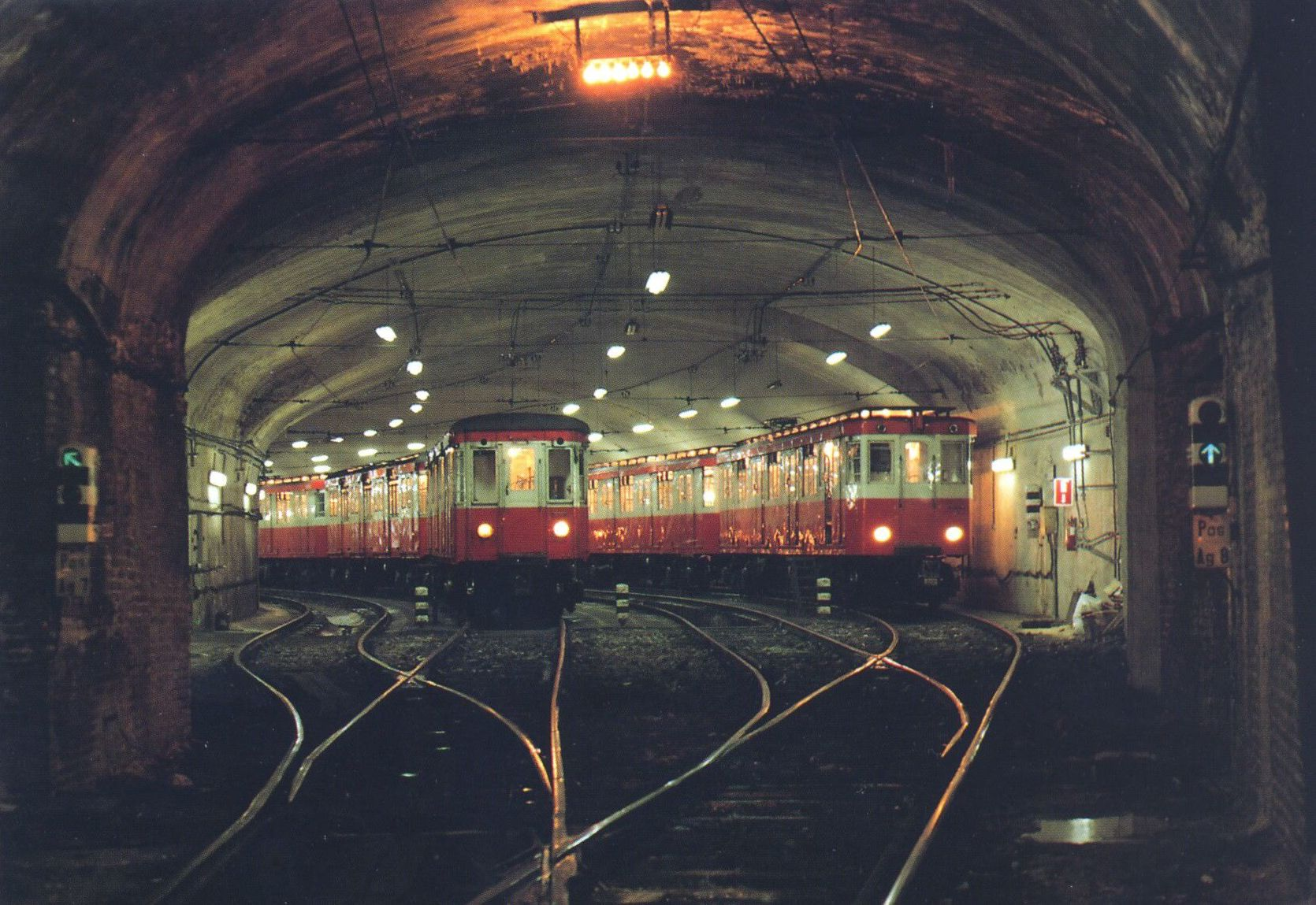
Historic rolling stock of the Madrid Metro.

Until the early 1990s and the transfer of the Metro system to the Autonomous Community of Madrid, the rate of investment in the network by the central government was extremely low, and thus very old trains were used way beyond their intended lifespans. Particularly loathed was the case of line 5, which was serviced by the nearly 40-year-old series 300 and 1000 from CAF. It was not uncommon that a child would ride to school on the same train his/her parents took decades earlier. Some renewals, along with the purchases of series 2000A and 5000, were started by the socialist regional government of Joaquín Leguina, but in 1995 the People's Party took over the government with the promise to widely extend and improve the Metro service. New lines were built and old ones refurbished: line 5 service was disturbed for several years as some stations at a time were closed and refitted, while line 3 was closed for two consecutive summers in order to expand its platforms to 90 m. Then, new rolling stock was also requested: 1998 saw the arrival of the first CAF series 2000B, retiring the infamous series 1000. Initially, the better-preserved series 300 were refitted and painted in the new blue-white colour scheme (from the old red corporate image), but they were also retired with the arrival of more series 2000B and, finally, series 3000.

== Ticketing system and fares ==
The ticketing and fare systems on the Madrid Metro, as well as on all public transportation within the Community of Madrid, are controlled by the Consorcio Regional de Transportes de Madrid (CRTM), which is a public body owned by a consortium of local governments.

=== Transport cards ===
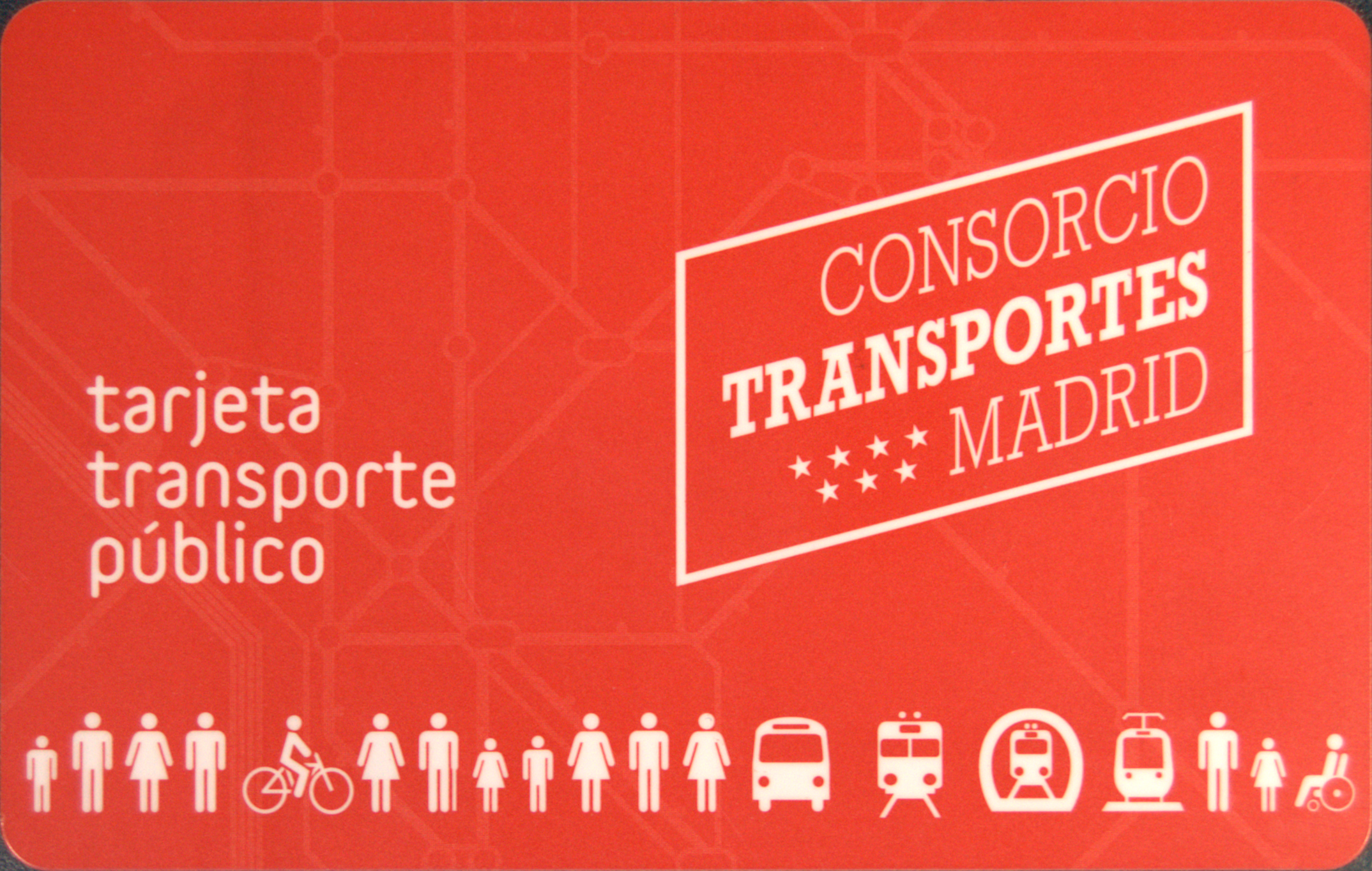
The reverse side of a standard Public Transport Card

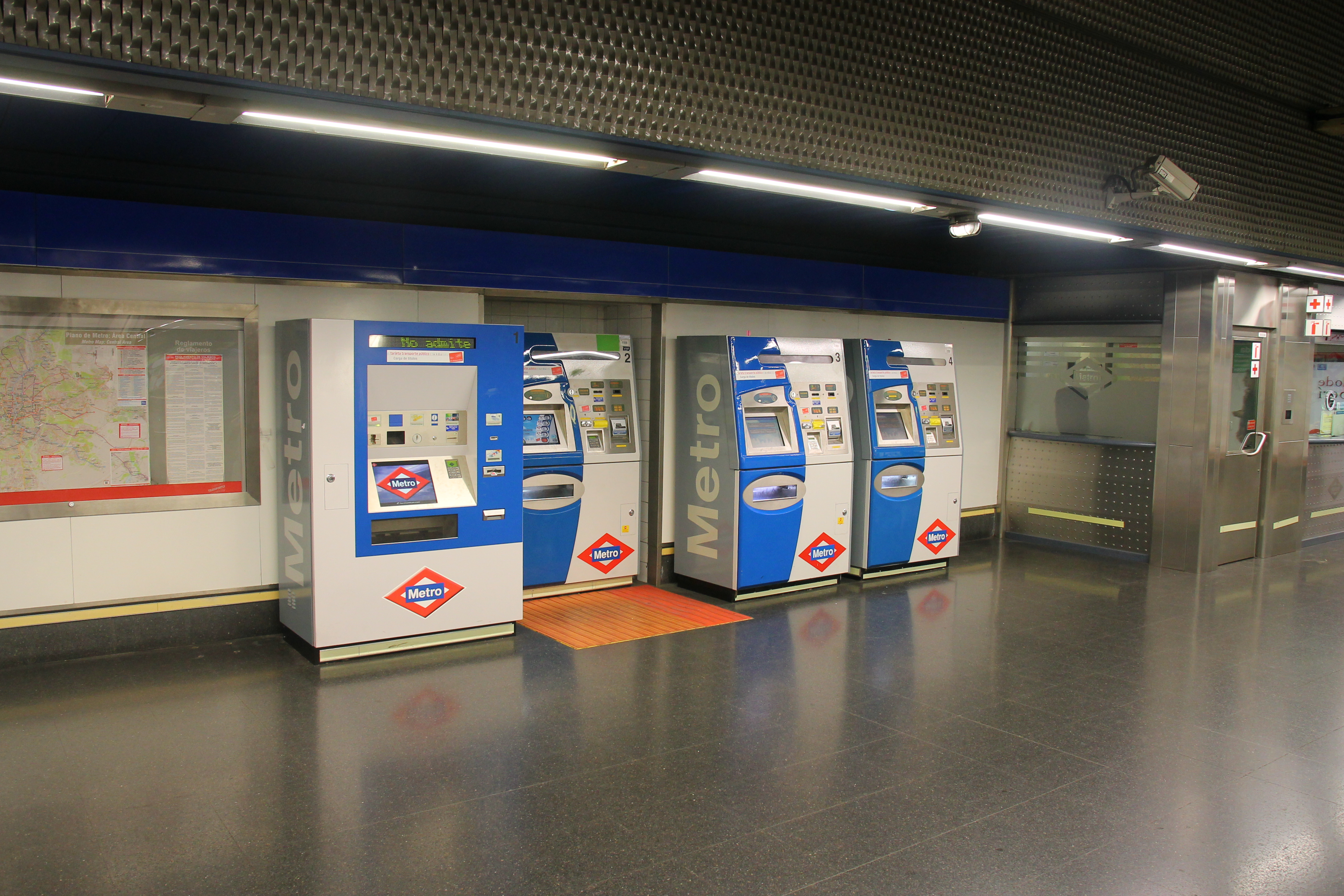
Ticket machines used on the Madrid Metro

In order to travel on the Metro, it is necessary to obtain a contactless Public Transport Card (TTP) (Note: Abbreviation of Tarjeta Transporte Público) issued by the Community of Madrid. There are two main types of cards available: the Multicard and the Personal Card. Once a TTP is purchased, it can be topped up with tickets at ticket machines or on the Madrid Metro app. Pay as you go is not available on the Metro.

The Multicard (or Multi TTP) can be collected from ticket machines located at all Metro stations, or from over 1300 designated small retail outlets located in the municipalities within the fare zone system. Each card costs €2.50. These cards are anonymous and, as such, may be used by any passenger at any time. It is even possible for multiple passengers to travel on the same Multicard simultaneously (as long as all passengers start and end their journey together and the appropriate number of tickets has been loaded onto the card).

The standard Personal Card or Personal TTP can be obtained by filling out an application form, which can be done either online or in a pre-booked appointment at one of 22 of CRTM's dedicated management offices. The price of a Personal TTP is €4.00. Unlike Multicards, Personal Cards display the cardholder's name and photograph, and are therefore not transferrable: only the cardholder is permitted to use it. The cardholder may, however, still use their own card to travel together with other passengers (provided that the passengers start and end their journey together and that the card has been topped up with the appropriate number of additional single tickets for the accompanying travellers). A Personal TTP also includes within it (but does not display) its owner's other personal details, such as age, disability status and familial status; this allows the system to show the correct ticket prices to the cardholder, as these may vary depending on these factors.

In addition to these, there are also two special types of personal TTPs, which are likewise non-transferrable: the Children's Card and the Blue Card, both of which offer cheaper fares compared to the standard Personal Card (see fare discounts below).

=== Tickets ===
Once a ticket is purchased and loaded onto a Public Transport Card, the ticket must be validated upon entering the Metro system. This is done using ticket barriers, at which the passenger needs to place the TTP near the dedicated reader to gain access into the system. All stations have ticket barriers at entrances, and some stations additionally have barriers at the exits.

The CRTM offers three main categories of tickets to Metro users: Single/10-Trip Tickets, Tourist Tickets and Transport Passes.

==== Single and 10-Trip Tickets ====
A Single Ticket (Spanish: Billete Sencillo) and a 10-Trip Ticket (Billete de 10 Viajes) can be loaded onto either a Multicard or a Personal card. The former ticket is valid for one trip on the Metro network, while the latter is valid for up to ten journeys on the network and costs significantly less than ten individual Single Tickets.

Single Tickets are only valid on the day of the purchase until end of service (approximately 1:30am), except for tickets bought shortly after midnight which can also be used on the following day.

For Single and 10-Trip tickets, the Madrid Metro and the light-rail Metro Ligero have their own combined set of fare zones, separate from all other public transport modes in the region. There are six fare zones in total. One of these is called MetroMadrid, which mostly covers the parts of the two networks with the Madrid city borders (including the entire Metro Ligero line ML1). (Note: The Metro Ligero stops at Colonia Jardín (ML2 and ML3) and Estación de Aravaca (ML2) are excluded from this zone despite being located within Madrid itself; however, Colonia Jardín station on line 10 is part of the zone.) The other five zones, meanwhile, are divided by their geographic position in respect to Madrid; these zones, in order from north to west going clockwise, are:

- MetroNorte – located north-northeast of Madrid, it covers the section of line 10B in the cities of Alcobendas and San Sebastián de los Reyes: i.e., between La Granja and Hospital Infanta Sofía stations inclusive.
- MetroEste – situated to the east of the city, it covers the section of line 7B in the municipalities of Coslada and San Fernando de Henares: i.e., between Barrio del Puerto and Hospital del Henares stations inclusive.
- TFM – located southeast of the city, it covers the entirety of line 9B (i.e., between Puerta de Arganda and Arganda del Rey stations inclusive). Puerta de Arganda is actually located within Madrid itself, meaning it is the only station on the whole network to be located in two single-ticket fare zones (as both MetroMadrid and TFM tickets are valid at the station); the other TFM stations are located in the municipalities of Rivas-Vaciamadrid and Arganda del Rey.
- MetroSur – the largest of the outer zones, located south-southwest of the capital. It covers all Metro routes inside the cities of Móstoles, Alcorcón, Leganés, Getafe and Fuenlabrada; that is, the entirety of line 12, El Casar station on line 3, Puerta del Sur and Joaquín Vilumbrales stations on line 10, and La Fortuna station on line 11.
- MetroLigeroOeste – to the west of Madrid, covers Metro Ligero lines ML2 and ML3 in their entirety, serving the towns of Pozuelo de Alarcón and Boadilla del Monte (plus a small part of Alcorcón). (Note: The Metro Ligero stops at Colonia Jardín (ML2 and ML3) and Estación de Aravaca (ML2) are also included in this zone despite being located within Madrid itself; however, Colonia Jardín station on line 10 is not part of the zone.)

Most Single and 10-Trip Tickets are valid for only one of the zones each. There exists also a set of Combo tickets, which cover all six zones, thus being valid on the whole of the Madrid Metro and Metro Ligero networks.

As of November 2025, the standard fares for Single and 10-Trip Tickets are as follows:

Zone	Ticket	
Zone	Single	10-Trip
MetroMadrid	€1.50–€2.00 (Note: The exact price is calculated as follows: €1.50 for a journey of up to 5 stations; an extra €0.10 for every additional station between 6 and 9; €2.00 for a journey of 10 or more stations.)	€7.30
MetroNorte	€1.50	€6.70
MetroEste	€1.50	€6.70
TFM	€2.00	€7.30
MetroSur	€1.50	€6.70
MetroLigeroOeste	€2.00	€7.30
Combo ticket	€3.00	€10.90

The MetroMadrid 10-Trip ticket, unlike other tickets in this category, is additionally valid on Madrid's urban buses operated by EMT Madrid; for this reason it is often known as the "10-Trip Metrobus".

For trips to or from the two airport stations (Aeropuerto T1-T2-T3 and Aeropuerto T4), it is necessary to purchase an Airport Supplement. This can be bought either together with a Single Ticket (as a "MetroMadrid + Airport" or "Combo + Airport" ticket) or separately if there is already a valid Single or 10-Trip Ticket on the Transport Card; in either case the supplement costs €3.00 in addition to the usual ticket.

Passengers travelling on the Metro Ligero lines ML2 and ML3 may use a MetroLigeroOeste ticket to begin or end their journey at Colonia Jardín station, but may not use it to change to or from line 10 at the station – for such a journey, a Combo ticket is needed. Changing at Colonia Jardín from the ML2 to the ML3 or vice versa is permitted but counts as two separate journeys for ticketing purposes.

==== Tourist Tickets ====
A Tourist Ticket (Spanish: Título Turístico) is a type of short-term season ticket. It allows unlimited travel on the Madrid Metro – as well as on other local modes of public transport in the Community of Madrid – for a period between 1 and 7 consecutive days. Tourist Tickets are primarily intended for use by those paying a short-term visit to the area, such as tourists or people on business trips; as such, they are only available for purchase on Multicards.

Two distinct fare zones are defined for Tourist Tickets: Zone A and Zone T. Tickets for Zone A allow for travel on the parts of the Metro, Metro Ligero and suburban rail (Cercanías) networks that are located in the city of Madrid itself, as well as on all urban bus routes operated by EMT Madrid. (Note: Except for the Airport Express bus route 203 (or N27 at night), for which special fares apply.) The latter zone covers all public transport in the Community of Madrid (as well as some small parts of the neighbouring autonomous community of Castilla-La Mancha), (Note: The area covered by Zone T is identical to that of all CRTM zones from A to E2 inclusive – see below.) with tickets valid on all Metro, Metro Ligero and Cercanías routes, EMT Madrid's urban buses, interurban buses, urban buses of other municipalities, and the Parla Tram.

As of November 2025, the standard fares for Tourist Tickets are as follows:

Zone	Validity period (days)					
Zone	1	2	3	4	5	7
A	€10.00	€17.00	€22.50	€27.00	€32.50	€42.00
T	€15.00	€25.50	€34.00	€42.00	€49.00	€61.00

Also available for purchase on the Multicard is a Children's Tourist Ticket, for passengers between 4 and 11 years old. These tickets are all half the price of the corresponding standard Tourist Tickets.

Unlike Single and 10-Trip Tickets, Tourist Tickets may be used at the airport stations without the need to purchase the Airport Supplement.

==== Transport Passes ====
Map of the season-ticket fare zones within the Community of Madrid set out by the CRTM

A Transport Pass (Spanish: Abono Transporte) is a season ticket available for purchase only on a Personal TTP. Similarly to a Tourist Ticket, the pass allows unlimited travel on all local public transport in the Community of Madrid – namely, the Madrid Metro, Metro Ligero, Madrid's suburban rail (Cercanías) services, EMT Madrid's urban buses, interurban buses, (Note: Except for the Zone A pass, which is not valid on any interurban bus routes, even for journeys that stay entirely within the zone.) urban buses of other municipalities, and the Parla Tram – for a set number of days within all the zones specified.

Since December 2023, CRTM only offers 30-day passes to the general public. Previously annual passes were also offered, but these were discontinued by the CRTM's board of directors; however, annual passes may still be purchased by legal entities.

For season ticket purposes, the CRTM divides the whole public transport network of the area into eight zones (distinct from the Metro's own single-ticket fare zones), named A, B1, B2, B3, C1, C2, E1 and E2. Zone A is approximately bounded by the borders of the city of Madrid itself (and is therefore nearly identical to the Metro's MetroMadrid zone for single tickets), while the remaining zones form progressively larger approximate rings around the city. Zones A to C2 together cover the entirety of the Community of Madrid, while zones E1 and E2 are special zones, as they are located in the neighbouring Castilla-La Mancha but are still served by some local public transport routes to and from the Community of Madrid. In these last two zones, TTPs and tickets issued by the CRTM are only valid for journeys either to or from zones A–C2 – it is not possible to use them for local journeys that stay within the two outer zones.

The Metro network runs only in zones A, B1, B2 and B3. Over two-thirds of the system (i.e., the whole network within Madrid's borders) is in zone A; the remaining zones cover the following municipalities served by the Metro:

- Zone B1 covers parts of the Metro that serve Alcobendas and San Sebastián de los Reyes (line 10B), Coslada and San Fernando de Henares (line 7B), Rivas-Vaciamadrid (line 9B), Getafe (lines 3 and 12), Leganés (lines 11 and 12), and Alcorcón (lines 10 and 12).
- Zone B2 covers line 12 in Fuenlabrada and Móstoles.
- Zone B3 covers line 9B in Arganda del Rey.

As of November 2025, the standard fares for 30-day Transport Passes, valid for adults between the ages of 26 and 64 inclusive, are:

Zones (Note: Each cell in the table corresponds to the price of a 30-day Transport Pass valid for: the row zone, the column zone, and all the zones between them. For example, the cell at the intersection of B2 and E1 (with a value of €43.20) corresponds to the price of a 30-day pass valid for zones B2, B3, C1, C2 and E1. The first row and first column (corresponding to Zone A) are inferred from the "single-zone" table in the references; despite the name, these passes are valid for all zones up to and including the given zone (for example, a "single-zone" C1 pass is valid in zones A, B1, B2, B3 and C1). The remaining values are taken from the "inter-zone" table in the references.)	Madrid Metro	Madrid Metro	Madrid Metro	Madrid Metro	Madrid Metro	Madrid Metro	Madrid Metro	Madrid Metro
Madrid Metro	€32.70	€38.20	€43.20	€49.20	€49.20	€49.20	€66.30	€79.00
Madrid Metro	€38.20	— (Note: With the exception of zone A, CRTM does not offer single-zone Transport Passes; a pass covering at least two zones has to be purchased instead.)	€28.70	€32.70	€32.70	€32.70	€49.20	€53.70
Madrid Metro	€43.20	€28.70	—	€28.70	€28.70	€28.70	€43.20	€49.20
Madrid Metro	€49.20	€32.70	€28.70	—	€28.70	€28.70	€38.20	€43.20
Madrid Metro	€49.20	€32.70	€28.70	€28.70	—	€28.70	€32.70	€38.20
Madrid Metro	€49.20	€32.70	€28.70	€28.70	€28.70	—	€28.70	€32.70
Madrid Metro	€66.30	€49.20	€43.20	€38.20	€32.70	€28.70	— (Note: Since zones E1 and E2 are located outside of the Community of Madrid, the CRTM does not offer any tickets or passes for journeys entirely within these zones.)	—
Madrid Metro	€79.00	€53.70	€49.20	€43.20	€38.20	€32.70	—	—

For passengers between the ages of 15 and 25 (inclusive), the CRTM instead offers a flat fare of €10.00, which is valid for all zones from A to E2.

Passengers between the ages of 7 and 14 and over the age of 65 can obtain 30-day passes valid for zones A to C2 free of charge (although the passes must still be manually loaded onto the Personal Card at the ticket machines or on the app). No discount is offered for zones E1 and E2.

Unlike Single and 10-Trip Tickets, but like Tourist Tickets, Transport Passes are valid for travel to and from airport stations; the Airport Supplement is not required.

=== Fare discounts ===
The Community of Madrid offers a range of discounts on local public transportation within its territory – including on the Metro – for people who meet certain personal or social conditions. Since these discounted fares are only applicable to specific passengers, they are only available for purchase on Personal Public Transport Cards belonging to these individuals, and not available at all on Multicards.

Children between the ages of 4 and 6 are eligible for a Children's Card, which is obtainable by appointment free of charge. Each Children's TTP is programmed to expire on the cardholder's 7th birthday; it allows the child to travel on the entire public transport network within the Community of Madrid for free until that date. It does not, however, offer any discounts for travel to or from zones E1 and E2.

Spanish citizens registered in the city of Madrid who meet certain age or disability conditions and have a limited income are entitled to a Blue Card, which can likewise be obtained by free appointment. This card offers a 30-day zone A pass for a price of €3.70 (much lower than the standard fare of €32.70); for other zones, however, the Blue TTP is not valid, and its users must obtain a standard Personal TTP instead.

Members of a "large family" (Note: Spanish: familia numerosa) (as defined in Spanish law), as well as people who meet certain disability conditions (defined in Spain as "disabilities of 65% or more"), are entitled to a discount on all Single Tickets, 10-Trip Tickets, Transport Passes, and the Airport Supplement. Unlike the discounted fares described above, which require a Blue TTP or a Children's TTP, these discounts are available on the standard Personal TTPs belonging to the entitled passengers: the special fares are unlocked by CRTM after a successful application process. The large-family discount is either 20% (for "general-category" families) or 50% (for "special-category" families) off the standard fares; the disability discount is valued at 20% off the regular fares. Furthermore, if a person is entitled to both the large-family and disability discounts, the two discounts are applied together, giving a total of 40% or 70% off.

== Non-rail services ==
=== Heritage sites ===
In addition to operating the Metro network, the Metro de Madrid company also has a heritage department, which is in charge of the research and conservation of the historical and artistic elements of the system. Several of these elements are available for view to the public, either as museums or as small permanent exhibitions.

==== Museums ====
As of March 2026, there are five designated museum sites operated by Metro de Madrid across the city.

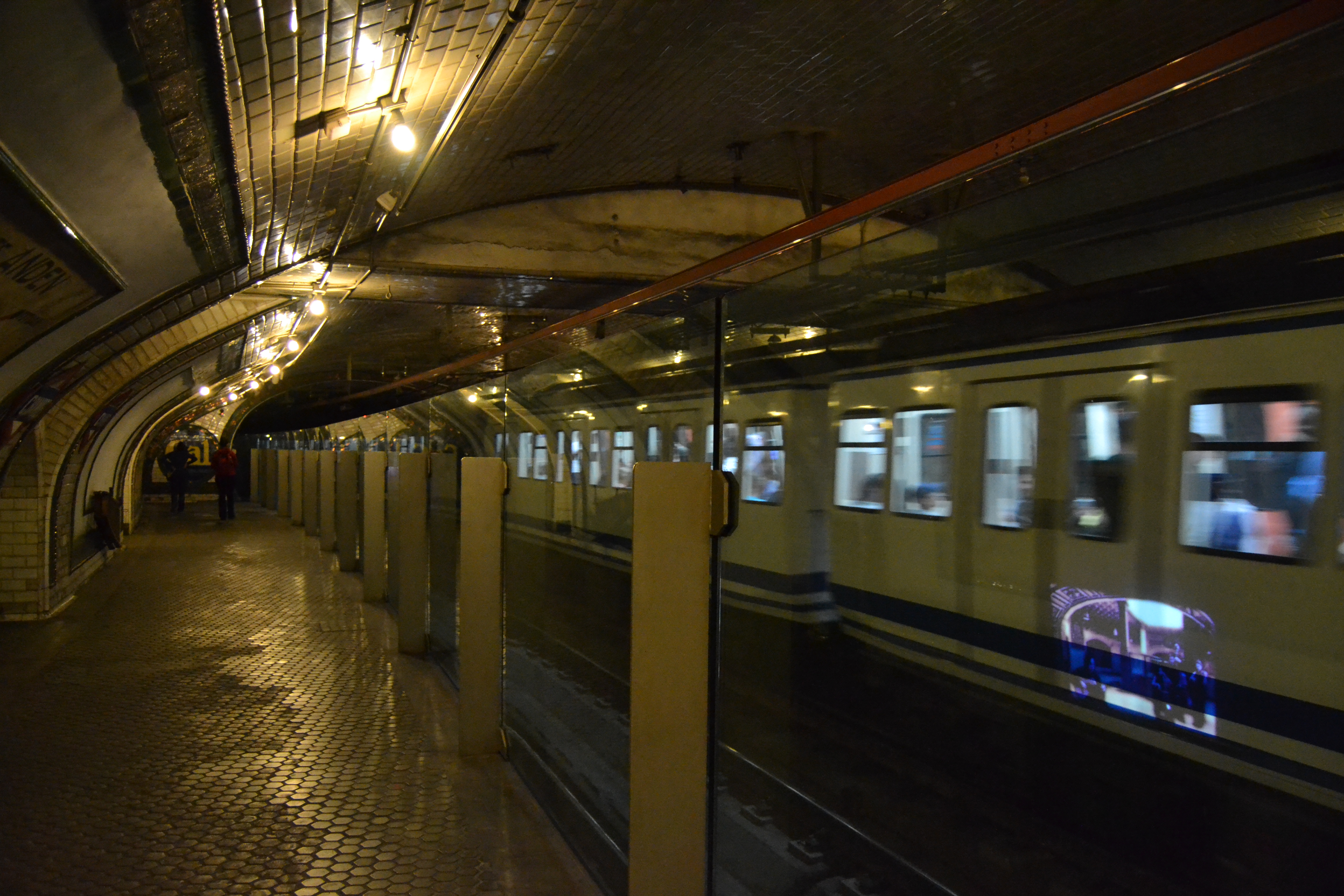
The platform level at Chamberí ghost station with a passenger train passing through without stopping

One of the most well-known museums on the system is the ghost station at Chamberí. Located on line 1 between Iglesia and Bilbao stations, Chamberí station formed part of the very first Metro line in the city – the route between Cuatro Caminos and Sol – which had opened in 1919. The line was undergoing major upgrades during the 1960s, which included extending the platforms on the line from 60 to 90 metres; however, Chamberí's location in the middle of a tight curve made it more difficult to extend the platforms there, while its proximity to both neighbouring stations made such extensions less financially viable. As a result, the operating company instead decided to permanently close the station. The last train called at Chamberí on 22 May 1966 and, to date, it is the only station on the Madrid Metro network to have been closed to passengers. The abandoned station was eventually restored and reopened to the public as a museum in 2008; visitors to the site can view many antique features of the Metro that date from the 1920s – including route diagrams, advertising posters, ticket turnstiles, and white bevelled tiles covering the walls – and it is also possible for visitors to go down to platform level, where line 1 trains still pass through today without stopping.

Elsewhere on line 1, Pacífico station was also affected by the line's upgrade work during the 1960s. The original single concourse at the station, designed by local architect Antonio Palacios, was deemed insufficient to handle the line's new projected capacity; therefore, it was closed in 1966 and replaced by two larger entrances elsewhere around the station. In 2008, Pacífico's concourse was refurbished, and in 2019 it was reopened to the public as a small museum, depicting Palacios' work during the 1920s.

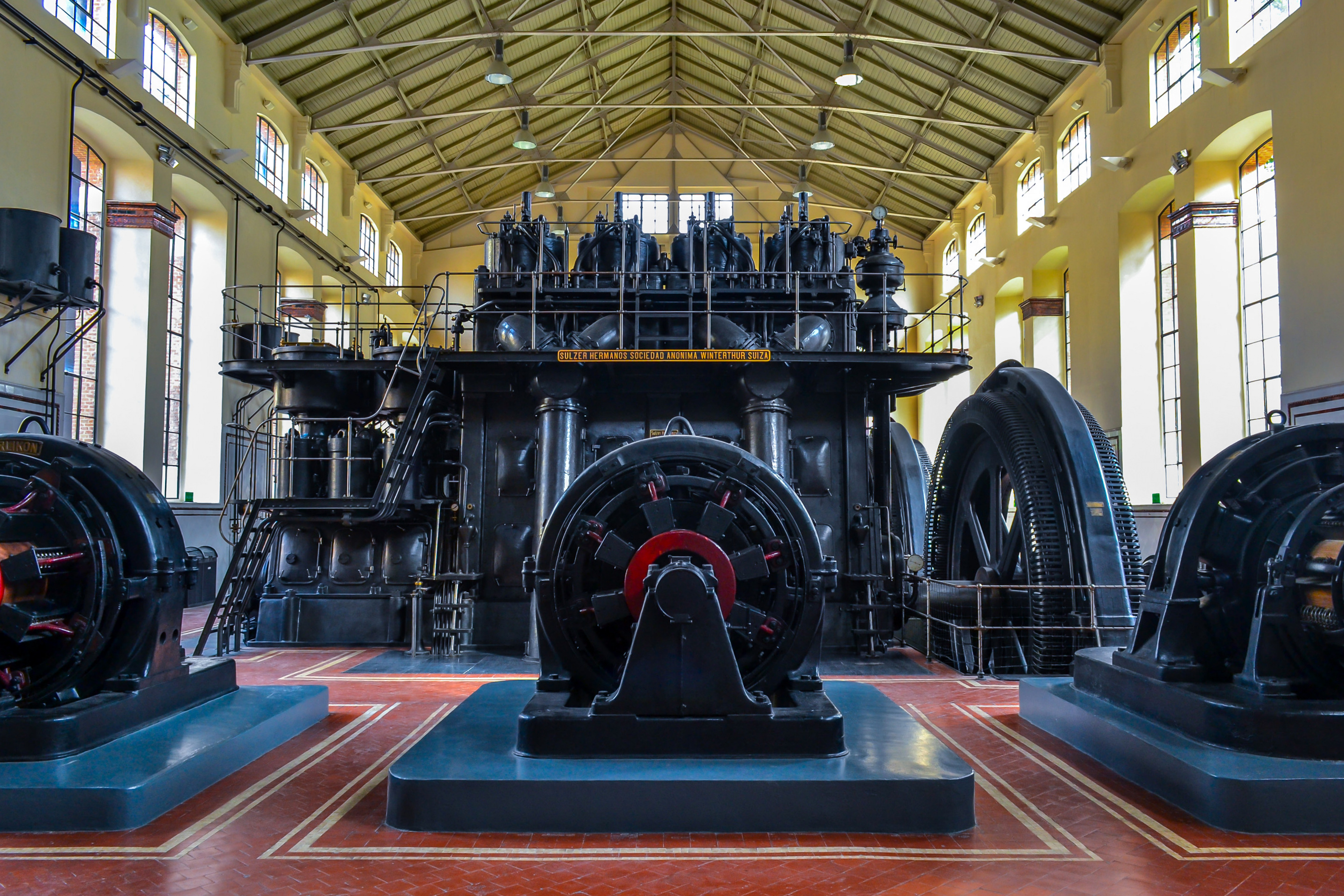
The historical Pacífico Power Plant

Pacífico is also the nearest Metro station to another museum – the former Pacífico Power Plant. This building, constructed between 1922 and 1923, once served as the primary source of electrical energy that powered the trains of the Madrid Metro. The power plant housed three large diesel engines along with other machinery such as transformers and alternators. The plant gradually lost much of its importance starting in the late 1930s; by the 1950s it had become totally obsolete, finally closing in 1972. The site reopened as a public museum in 2008, with much of its former equipment on display.

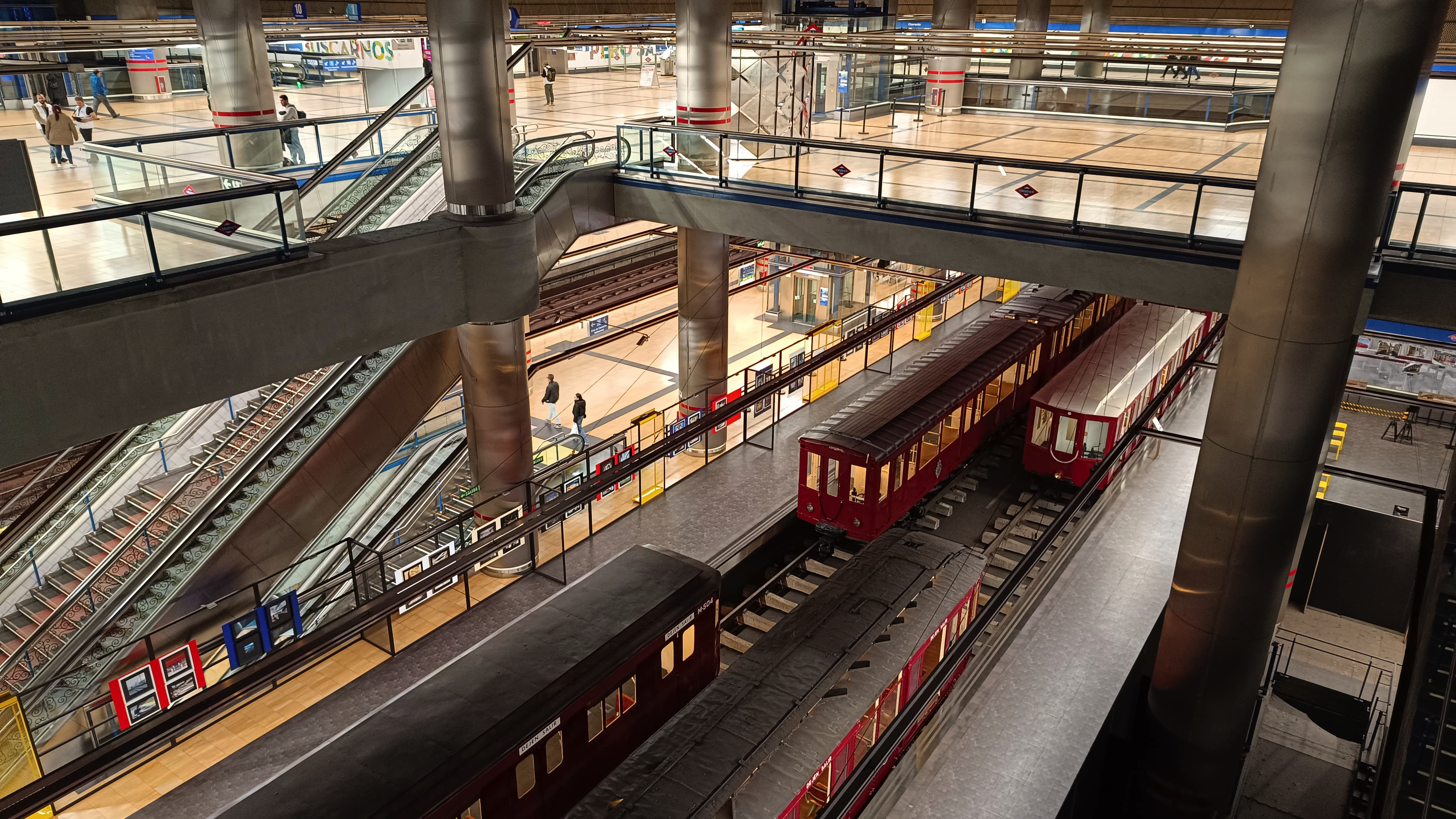
The historic rolling stock on display at Chamartín station

At Chamartín station, there is an exhibition of old rolling stock that once circulated on the Metro. In total there are twelve carriages at the site, including two carriages from the Cuatro Caminos series, which was the first type of train to operate on the network upon its opening in 1919. All models that feature in the museum were produced between 1919 and the 1960s (although some continued to serve Madrid until the early 1990s). Adjacent to the old trains there is also a small photo gallery, which summarises the history of the rolling stock on the Metro.

Ópera station, meanwhile, is the site of a 200-square-metre archaeological museum that features the remains of the historic Caños del Peral water supply system. The exhibition depicts: a fountain that once collected freshwater from the nearby Arenal stream, an aqueduct that supplied the water to the Royal Palace of Madrid, and parts of the city's sewage system.

All five museums are open on Fridays, Saturdays and Sundays. Visitors may enter the sites for free, although some museums require that a visit be booked in advance due to limited availability.

==== Small exhibitions ====
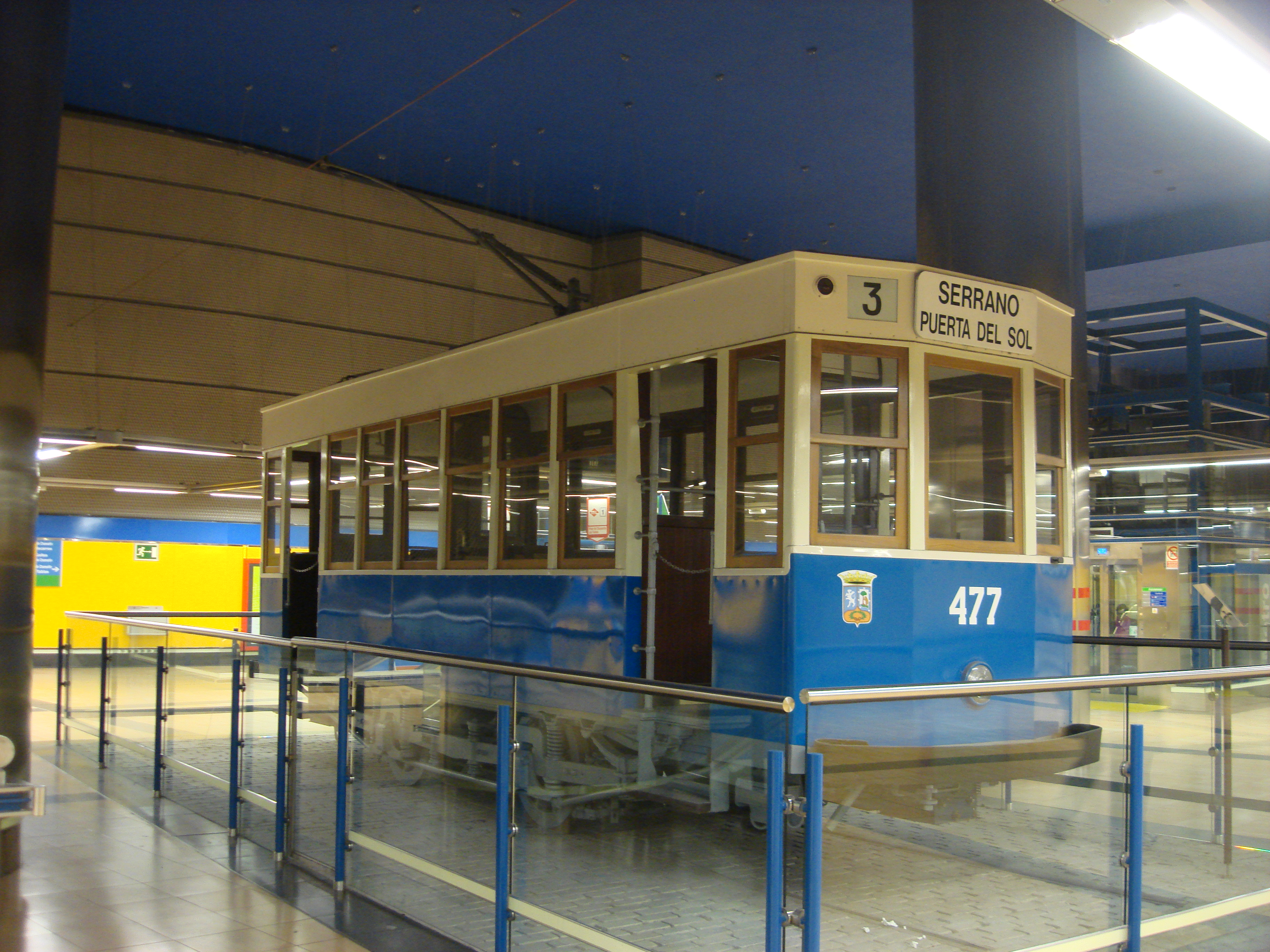
The old Madrid tram at Pinar de Chamartín station

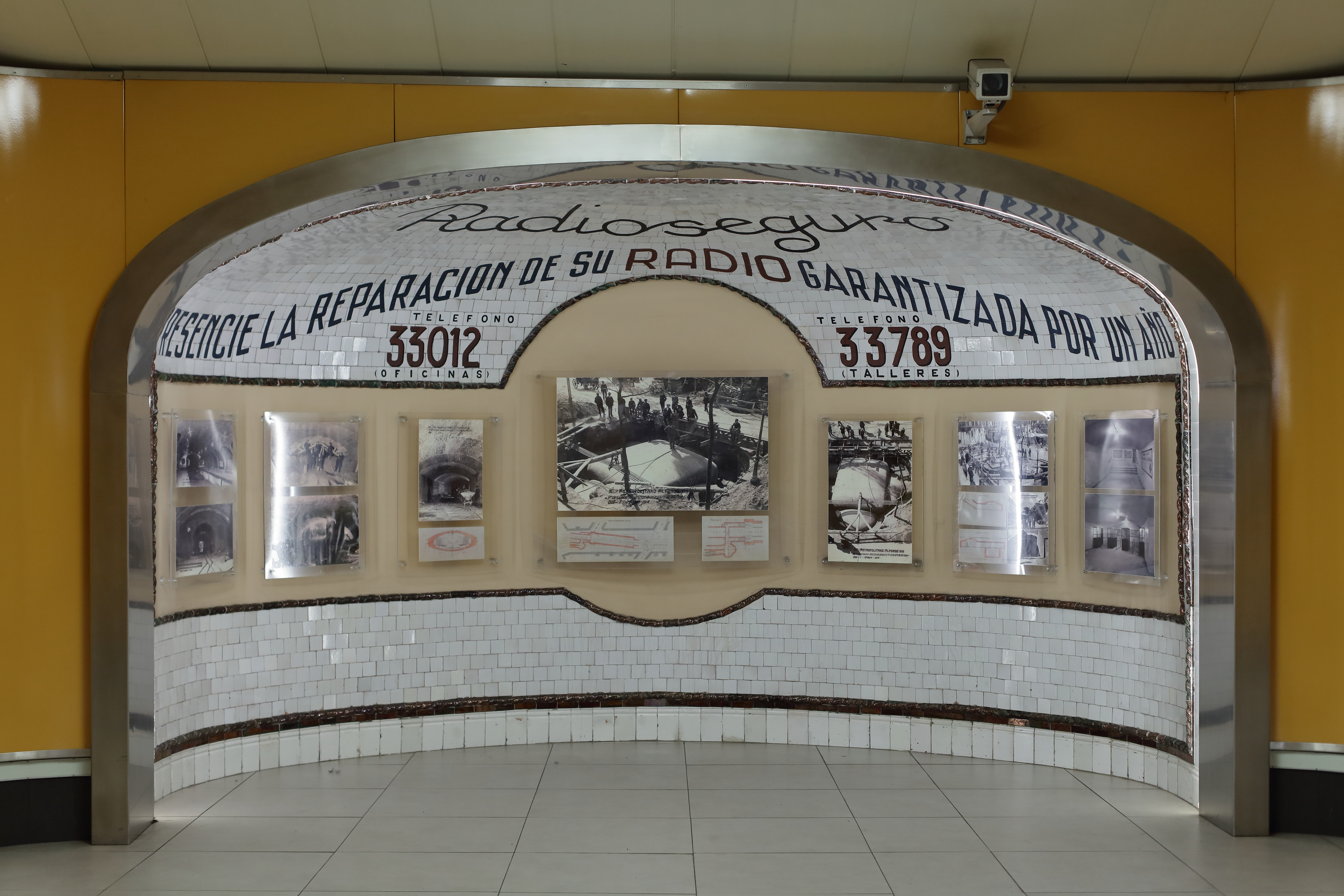
The exedra at Bilbao station featuring a heritage advert for a former radio company

In addition to the museums, there are numerous smaller permanent exhibitions within Metro station premises that illustrate some historical or artistic aspects of Madrid and its public transport. Eight of them are designated by Metro de Madrid as "traces of the past"; (Note: Spanish: huellas del pasado) these are:

- an antiquated Metro carriage from the Quevedo series – which had operated on lines 1 and 2 between 1925 and 1988 – above the platforms at Alto del Arenal station;
- an old tram unit dating from 1908, which had served the former Madrid tram network (closed in 1972), standing at Pinar de Chamartín station;
- the concourse at Tirso de Molina station, built in 1921 to a design by Antonio Palacios and left in its original state ever since;
- a small collection of sculptures of prehistoric animals at Carpetana station, where modernisation work in 2008 yielded the discovery of more than 10,000 fossil remains of animals that inhabited the area about 14 million years ago;
- two mini-museums within the premises of Cuatro Caminos and Gran Vía stations, both illustrating the character of the Madrid Metro during its first years of operation;
- two old advertising murals printed directly on tiled walls, at Sevilla and Bilbao stations; the latter mural is inside the domed section of an exedra.

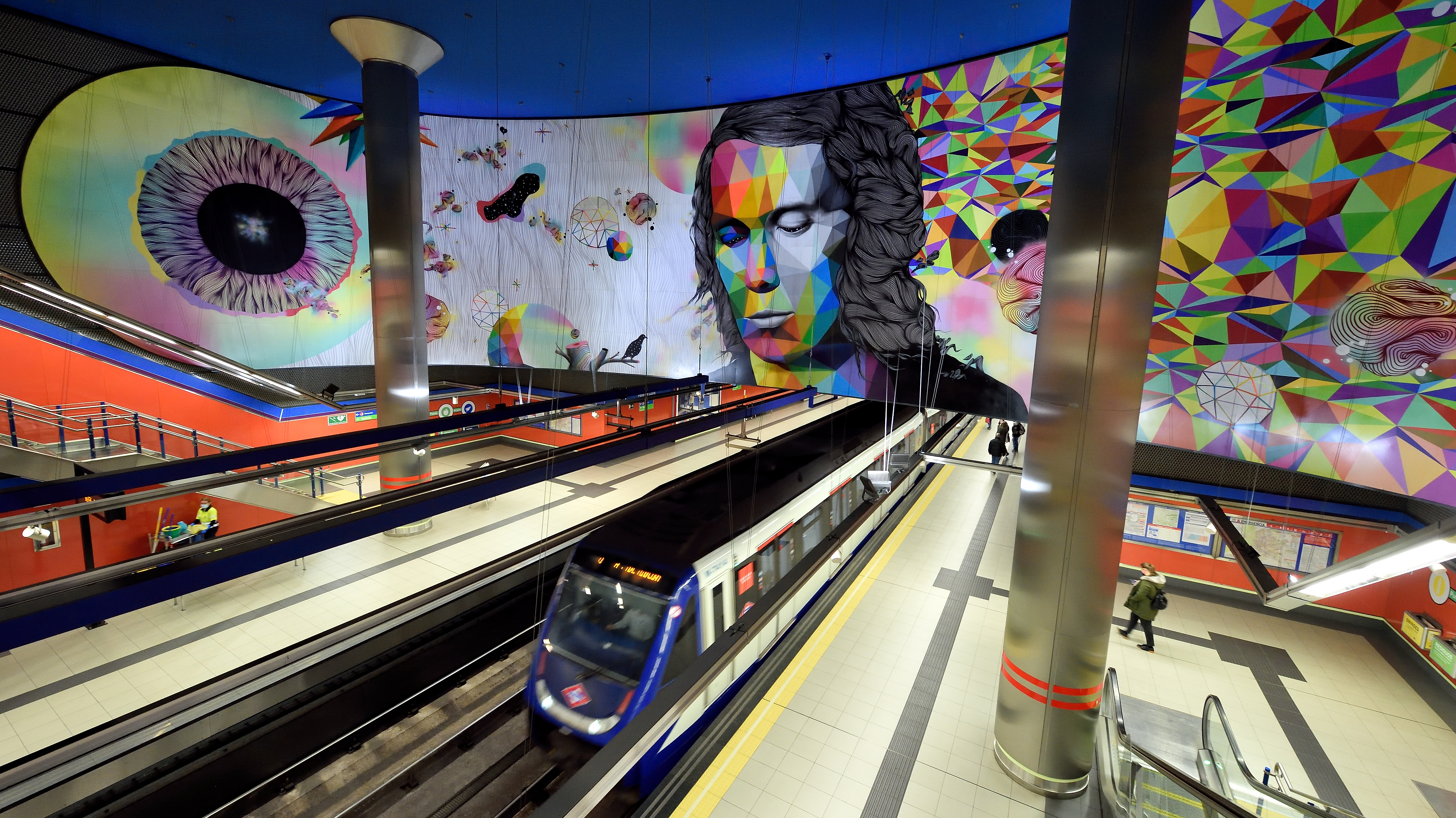
The large portrait at Paco de Lucía station, depicting the musician it is named after

Other minor exhibitions on the network include:

- a large, 300-square-metre (3,200 sq ft) portrait of Spanish musician Paco de Lucía above the platforms of the station of the same name;
- two murals illustrating works of art by painter Francisco Goya on the line 2 platforms of Goya station;
- a collection of murals drawn by cartoonist Antonio Mingote on the platforms of Retiro station.

All these exhibitions are located within the public corridors of the stations they are in; as such, they can be visited free of charge (except possibly for the price of a transport ticket, since some of them are located inside the ticket gateline).

=== Events and temporary exhibitions ===
Some Metro stations, as well as some of the aforementioned Metro museums, are large enough to accommodate public events. Such events typically occur approximately 5–15 times per year across the network; these can be annual celebrations, such as Christmas concerts and local Book Night activities, as well as one-off events, such as the three-day Fitness Festival in May 2011.

Stations and museums on the Madrid Metro are also sometimes used for temporary exhibitions. Retiro station has hosted multiple displays of modern art as part of the Expometro project, including "The Dream of Madrid" by Pablo Sycet, Rafael Arellano, Tono Carbajo, Christian Domec and Julio Juste in 1986, and "The Passengers" by Daniel Garbade in 2000. In 2019, the historic Pacífico Power Plant hosted the "100 years of the Metro" (Note: Spanish: 100 años de Metro) exhibition, which – together with the permanent exhibition of historic Metro trains at Chamartín which had opened in the same year – attracted more than 27,000 visitors.

=== Book services ===
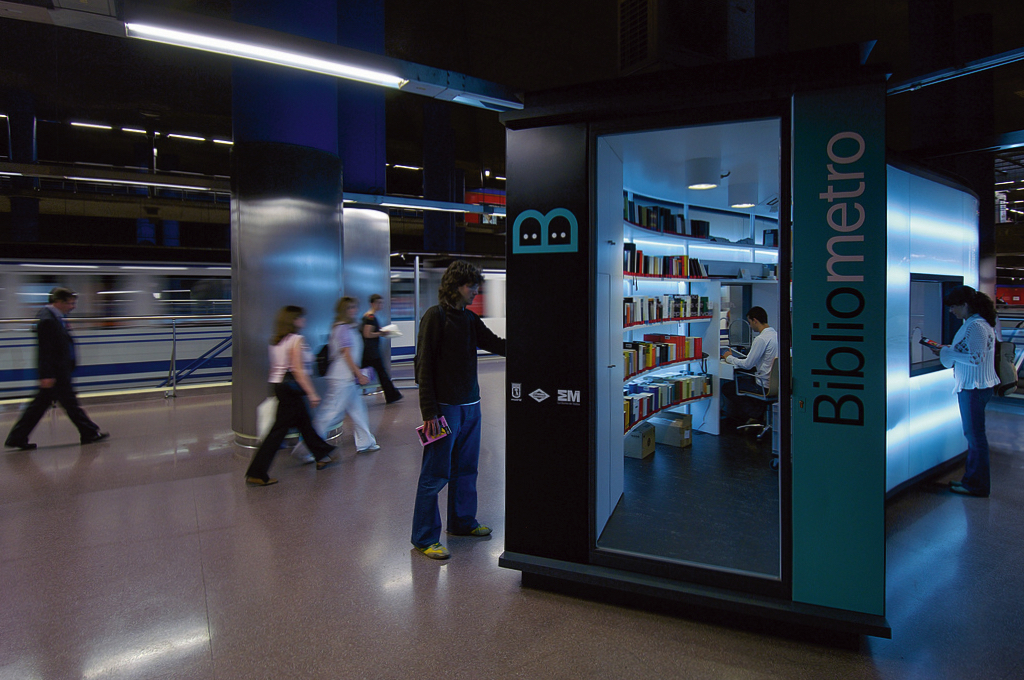
A bibliometro at Mar de Cristal station

As part of an effort by the Government of the Community of Madrid to encourage its local residents to engage in book reading, several book facilities have been rolled at various stations across the Metro network. The book services come in two types: bibliometros, which is a network of small library kiosks, and metrotecas, which are small bookshelves designated as book exchange points.

Bibliometros are staffed and open every weekday afternoon; books can be borrowed for free, although a personal library card must be obtained prior. The kiosks were designed by local architecture firm Paredes Pedrosa. As of March 2026, there are six active bibliometros on the system, at Chamartín, Mar de Cristal, Puerta de Arganda, Sierra de Guadalupe, Carabanchel Alto and Puerta del Sur stations. (Note: Prior to their closure in July 2025, there had been six more libraries on the network; these were at Moncloa, Canal, Nuevos Ministerios, Legazpi, Embajadores and Aluche.) Metrotecas, on the other hand, are unstaffed and may be used for free at any time during the opening hours of the Metro; users are encouraged to leave behind one book of their own for every book they collect. Metrotecas are more numerous than bibliometros, with a total of fifteen locations across the network as of September 2025.

=== Metro shop ===
The Madrid Metro has its own official merchandise shop, which sells a range of Metro-themed items. The available products include goods related to the Metro itself (such as posters, the Metro logo, and books about the history of the system), as well as Metro-branded everyday objects (such as kitchen products, articles of clothing, and toys). The products can be bought either on Metro de Madrid's dedicated website or at four physical stores; these are located at Ópera, Sol and Plaza de Castilla stations, and inside Terminal 4 of Madrid Barajas Airport.

== Future ==
=== Line extensions ===
As both the number of trips in the Metro and the number of inhabitants of the Community of Madrid have seen steady increases in recent years, there has been a growing political consensus that further extensions to the network are necessary.

==== Under construction ====
A provisional network diagram of the Madrid Metro from 2020, which includes the currently planned extensions of lines 5 and 11 as well as the extension of line 3 which has since opened.

As of September 2025, there are two network expansion projects under construction confirmed by the operator: a major lengthening of line 11 and a short extension of line 5.

===== Extension of line 11 =====
The currently relatively short line 11 is part of a major expansion project that will eventually turn the line into one of the longest on the network, with its northeastern end extended towards the Valdebebas neighbourhood in the northeast corner of the city. The project will open in three sections:

- Section 1: the southern section (Plaza Elíptica–Conde de Casal) is already under construction; it will extend the line from its present terminus at Plaza Elíptica by five additional stations: Comillas, Madrid Río (both brand-new stations with no interchange), Palos de la Frontera (interchange with line 3), Atocha (intechange with Renfe services to destinations throughout Spain, Madrid's Cercanías suburban rail services, and Metro line 1), and Conde De Casal (interchange with line 6). This extension will coincide with the construction of a major bus station at Conde De Casal, giving the line an additional interchange with inter-city bus services.
- Section 2: the central section (Conde de Casal–Mar de Cristal) will extend the line towards Mar de Cristal station (interchange with lines 4 and 8), with intermediate stations at Vinateros (interchange with line 9), La Elipa (interchange with line 2), Pueblo Nuevo (interchange with lines 5 and 7) and Arturo Soria (interchange with line 4). Metro de Madrid also includes the possibility of constructing more intermediate stations along this section, although makes no mention of where exactly those would be located.
- Section 3: the northern section (Mar de Cristal–Valdebebas Norte) will take the line to its final northern terminus in the new neighbourhood of Valdebebas, with three stations: Ciudad de la Justicia (adjacent to the existing Valdebebas station on the Cercanías network, with which it will form an interchange), Airport Terminal 4 (interchange with line 8, the Cercanías, and flights from Barajas Airport), and the terminus at Valdebebas Norte (a new station located at the northwestern end of Valdebebas, west of the airport).

The southwestern terminus of the line is also to be moved further west at some point during this project, with a one-stop extension to Cuatro Vientos where it will interchange with line 10.

As of 2025, section 1 of the project is already under construction, with latest estimates that it will open to the public in 2027. The contracts for designing the construction work of sections 2 and 3, as well as the southern extension, were awarded in 2022; at the time, the local government was expecting to open section 3 in 2027 as well, but it did not provide an opening date for either section 2 or the Cuatro Vientos route.

The project has earned line 11 its nickname "The Diagonal", as it will run across the whole city from the southwest to the northeast. Metro de Madrid claims that this extension will aid in the decentralisation of the city, given that the line will mostly run away from the city centre (except near Atocha). As such, it is expected to relieve the busy lines 6 and 10 (with the former currently handling most out-of-centre traffic, and the latter also running mostly southwest–northeast).

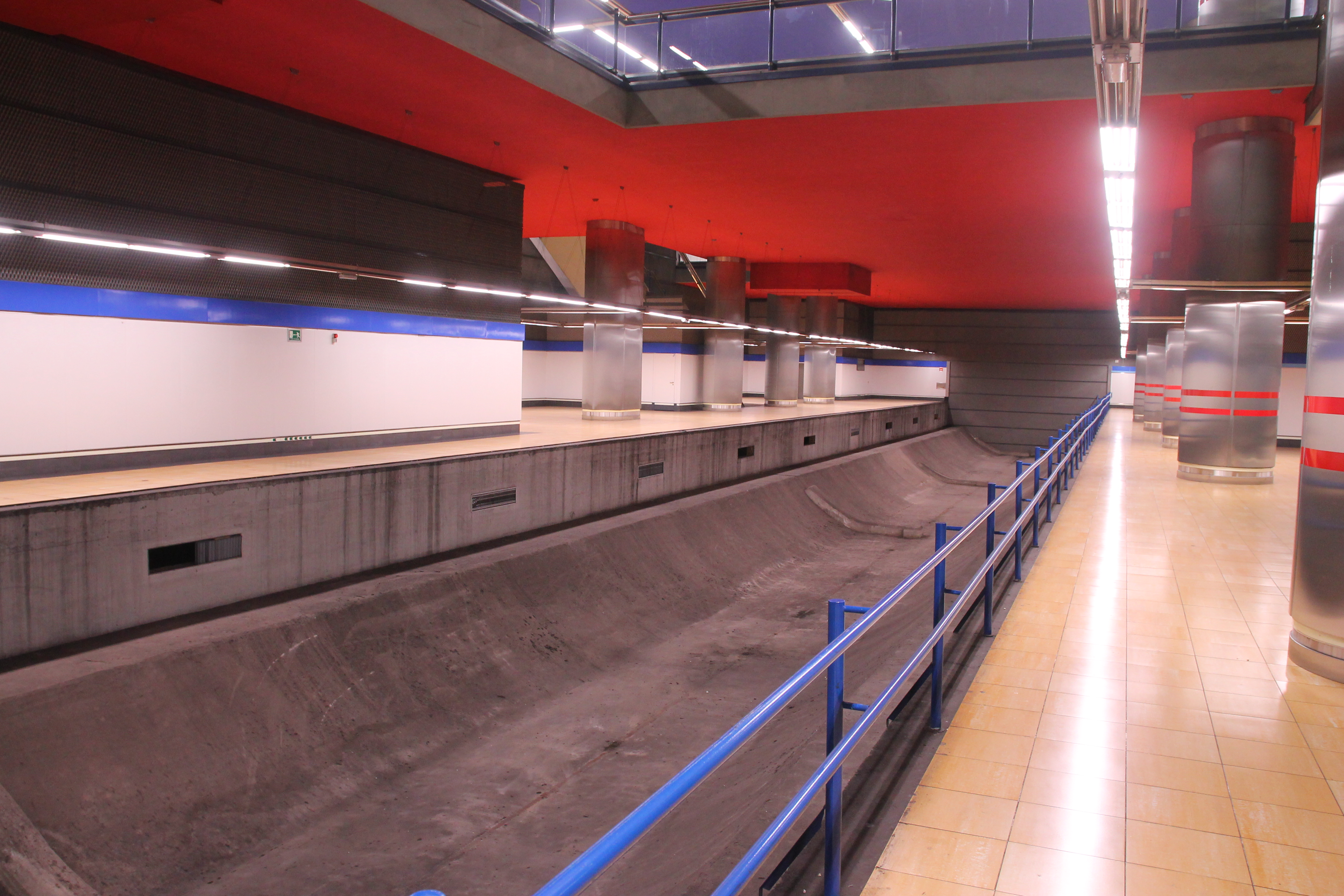
The empty trackbed at Chamartín station, constructed during the station's renovation project, in preparation for line 11's extension to the area before it was replaced by the current plan.

This project replaces an earlier proposal which would have instead extended the line along a semi-circular route towards Avenida de la Ilustración, via Atocha, Ascao, Arturo Soria and Chamartín. This plan was eventually scrapped in 2020, but not before extra empty platforms were built at Chamartín to accommodate a future extension there. At the southern terminus, some proposals envisaged that the line would instead head south to San Nicasio in Leganés, to connect with line 12, before the current scheme to Cuatro Vientos was adopted.

===== Line 5 to Barajas Airport =====
A single-station extension project is currently underway on line 5. This line will be extended one stop at its north-eastern end, beyond Alameda de Osuna towards Airport Terminals 1-2-3 station, where it will connect with line 8 and provide another direct link into the city centre for Madrid Barajas Airport. Construction of this extension began in 2025 and its planned opening date is in 2028.

==== Proposals ====
===== Nuevo Norte =====
The Community of Madrid has committed to the construction of a new short metro route from Chamartín station to the new Madrid Nuevo Norte development, with three or four new stations located within the new area. While Metro de Madrid has confirmed its plan to construct a route through the area in general, it is still unclear how it will be connected to the rest of the system. Early proposals suggested that this could be a standalone line running only between Chamartín and Nuevo Norte with fully driverless trains, though a map on the official website for the project suggested that the line could operate as a part of the current line 10, either as a branch line or as the line's new northern route (though in that last case it is unclear what would then happen to the existing section between Chamartín and Hospital Infanta Sofía via Tres Olivos).

From May 2025, the Community of Madrid explored the possibility of making the Chamartín–Nuevo Norte route part of line 1. Under this proposal, the line would have been extended northwards beyond Chamartín to Nuevo Norte; it would have also ceased to serve the section between Chamartín and Pinar de Chamartín stations via Bambú, which instead would have been absorbed into line 4.

In July 2026, the local government amended the plans once more, announcing that the section between Chamartín and Pinar de Chamartín would be retained as part of line 1, but with the new route between Chamartín and Nuevo Norte still built as an extension of the same line. This extension project would give line 1 two northern termini – one at Pinar de Chamartín and one at the new Fuencarral Norte station – with trains running alternately to and from either terminus. This would also make line 1 the first metro line in Madrid to operate with branches since 1970 (when the Ventas–Ciudad Lineal branch of line 2 was absorbed into line 5).

===== Changes to line 9 =====
Unlike the rest of the network, which is wholly owned and operated by Metro de Madrid itself, line 9B (the section of line 9 between Puerta de Arganda and Arganda del Rey) is operated on a concession basis by Transportes Ferroviarios de Madrid (TFM), a consortium of Metro de Madrid and a handful of private companies. This concession is due to expire in 2029, after which Metro de Madrid is expected to assume operating responsibilities of the route. In anticipation of this change in ownership, there have been calls from local residents on the line to eliminate the need to change trains at Puerta de Arganda in favour of through trains between Arganda del Rey and Paco de Lucía, thus unifying line 9 into a true single line. The Minister of the Housing, Transport and Infrastructures of the Community of Madrid, Jorge Rodrigo Domínguez, announced in September 2024 that he intends to introduce these through services. The platforms on line 9B are already long enough to handle the 6-carriage trains that operate on the rest of the line so the work required to allow for such services would be minimal. Despite this, Metro de Madrid has not commented on these proposals as of 2025. Due to the much lower catchment area on this part of the line, it is likely that even if such a project were to go ahead, not all trains would continue to Arganda del Rey, with some instead still terminating earlier en route.

At the same time, Metro de Madrid has also started work on constructing a new station on line 9B, between Puerta de Arganda and Rivas Urbanizaciones stations. This new station will serve the new communities of Los Ahijones and Los Berrocales once those are built and is projected to open in 2029, thus coinciding with the end of the TFM concession. One unconfirmed proposal, suggested by Jorge Rodrigo Domínguez, involves constructing the station with three or four tracks instead of two; this would either allow some trains to terminate there (if through trains are to operate) or allow the changeover point to be moved from Puerta de Arganda to this new station (if changeovers are to continue as at present).

=== New trains ===
A train from the new series destined for line 6, on a test run in northern Spain.

In November 2024, Metro de Madrid published an announcement that they had ordered 80 new trainsets from Spanish manufacturer CAF, with a total cost of about €950 million. 40 of these trains will be of the broad loading gauge type; these are to be used on line 6 and will be fully driverless – a first for the Madrid Metro. The other half of the order consists of narrower trainsets, which will be semi-automatic and will carry a driver; these sets are destined for line 1. Both series of trains are expected to enter service on their respective lines from early 2027 and will replace some of the oldest units currently in service, most notably the aging 2000 and 5000 series. Meanwhile, the relatively new 8000 series trains presently used on line 6 will be redeployed on other wide-loading-gauge lines, including supporting the extension of line 11 which is due to open around the same time.

In August 2025, Metro de Madrid announced an order for eight additional trainsets from CAF for line 6, bringing the total number of trains destined for the line up to 48.

=== Platform screen doors and automation ===
On 2 August 2024, Metro de Madrid announced that they intend to install platform screen doors at all stations on the circular line 6. In the second half of 2025 preparatory work was carried out, which consisted of major closures of the line (the western half of the circle was out of service between June and September, and the eastern half was closed from September to December); this work included reinforcing the platform edges so that they can support the platform screen doors, which are expected to be put into place station by station starting from January 2026. This project is considered to be the first major step towards the eventual goal of fully driverless operations on the line.

=== Accessibility improvements ===
As part of its Accessibility Plan, Metro de Madrid confirmed that they are going to install lifts at several stations throughout the Metro network to allow easier access for people of reduced mobility. Phase 1 of this plan (between 2016 and 2020) envisaged that 17 additional stations would be equipped with lifts, although by 2020 only 11 of those stations were upgraded, plus one more that was not part of the original plan (Sevilla). Phase 2 (2021–2028) is expected to bring step-free access to a further 24 stations, in addition to the 6 that had not received their upgrades in time for Phase 1.

In addition, in line with local policy, all newly built stations must be fully step-free from the start. As a result, the relatively new lines 8, 11 and 12 are already fully step-free at all its stations. Line 3 is likewise entirely wheelchair-accessible since the line's major upgrade in 2003–2006.

== See also ==
- List of metro systems
