= Granja =

Granja may refer to the following places:

== Brazil ==
- Granja, Ceará, a municipality in Ceará
- Granja Carolina, a neighborhood in Itapevi
- Granja Comary, a neighbourhood in Teresópolis
- Granja Viana, a neighbourhood in Barueri, Carapicuíba, Cotia, Embu das Artes and Jandira
- Granja do Torto, an official residence of the President of Brazil

== Chile ==
- La Granja, a commune in Santiago Province, Chile

== Portugal ==
- Granja-Amareleja wine, a Portuguese wine region
- Granja, São Tomé, a city in São Tomé and Príncipe
- Praia da Granja, a beach in Portugal

== Spain ==
- La Granja (Madrid Metro), a station on Line 10 of the Madrid Metro
- La Granja, Spain, municipality in Cáceres, Spain
- La Granja de la Costera, a municipality in Costera, Spain
- La Granja d'Escarp, a municipality in Segrià, Spain
- La Granja de San Ildefonso, a town and municipality in Segovia, Spain
- Granja de Moreruela, a municipality in Zamora, Spain
- Granja de Rocamora, a village in Alicante, Spain
- Granja de Torrehermosa, a municipality in Badajoz, Spain
- Parque de La Granja, a park in Santa Cruz de Tenerife, Spain
- Real Fábrica de Cristales de La Granja, a royal manufacturing factory in Spain
- Royal Palace of La Granja de San Ildefonso, an 18th-century palace in Spain

== See also ==
- La Granja (disambiguation)
