= Cuzco (Madrid Metro) =

Madrid Metro station

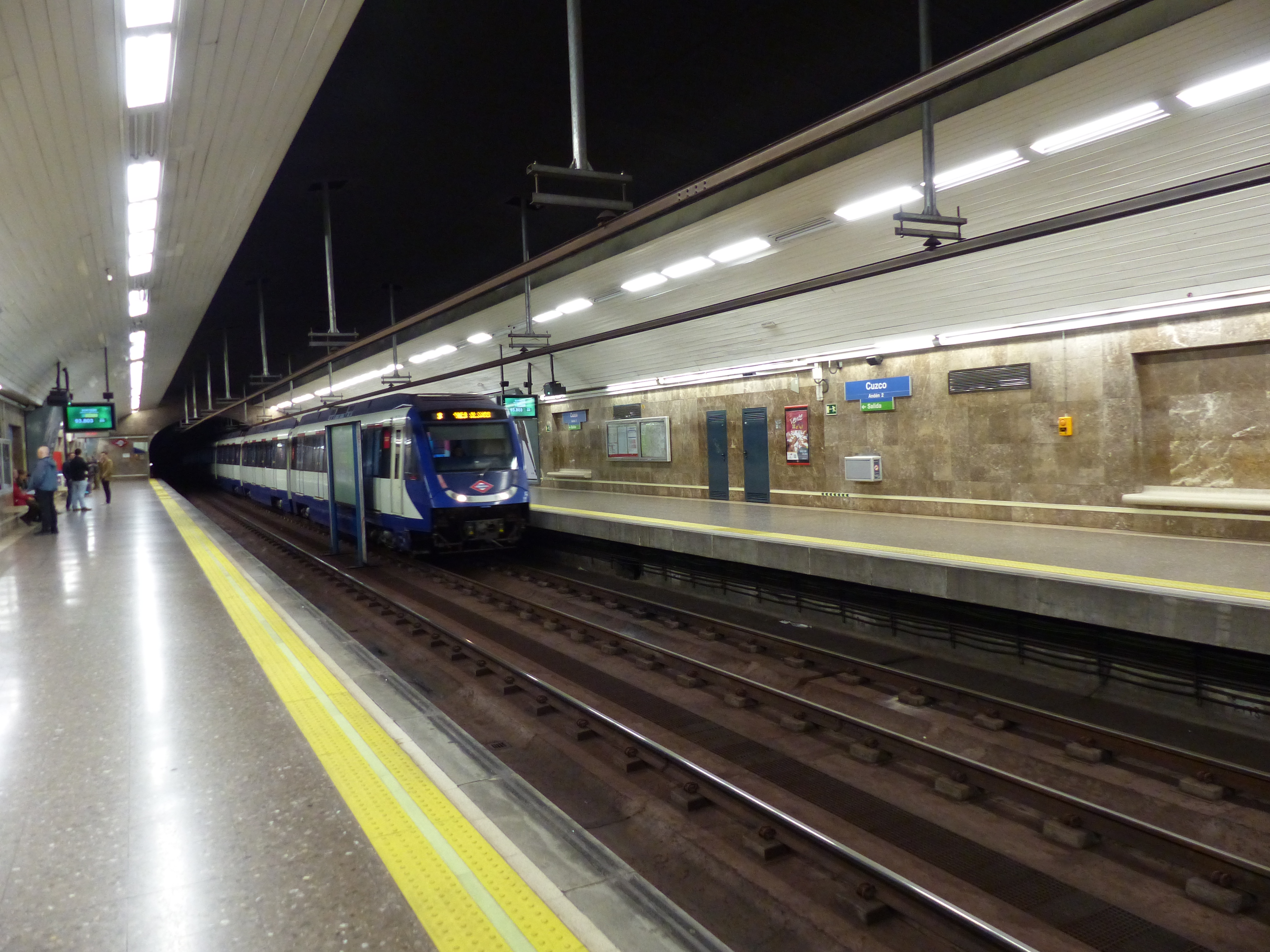

General information
- Location: Chamartín / Tetuán, Madrid; Spain
- Coordinates: 40.4584259°N 3.6898554°W
- System: Madrid Metro station
- Owner: CRTM
- Operator: CRTM

Construction
- Accessible: No

Other information
- Fare zone: A

History
- Opened: 10 June 1982; 44 years ago

Services
Preceding station	Madrid Metro	Following station
Plaza de Castilla towards Hospital Infanta Sofía	Line 10	Santiago Bernabéu towards Puerta del Sur
Location
- Location within Madrid

Cuzco [ˈkuθ.ko] is a station on Line 10 of the Madrid Metro, under the Plaza de Cuzco ("Cuzco Place"). It is located in fare Zone A.
