= Marqués de la Valdavia (Madrid Metro) =

Madrid Metro station

- Platform of the station

General information
- Location: Alcobendas, Madrid; Spain
- Coordinates: 40.5410236°N 3.6373849°W
- System: Madrid Metro station
- Owner: CRTM
- Operator: CRTM

Construction
- Accessible: yes

Other information
- Fare zone: B1

History
- Opened: 26 April 2007; 19 years ago

Services
Preceding station	Madrid Metro	Following station
Manuel de Falla towards Hospital Infanta Sofía	Line 10	La Moraleja towards Puerta del Sur
Location
- Location within Community of Madrid

Marqués de la Valdavia [maɾˈkes ðe la βalˈdaβja] is a station on Line 10 of the Madrid Metro, near the Calle del Marqués de la Valdavia, which was named for the politician Mariano Ossorio Arévalo, 3rd Marquess of Valdivia (1889–1969). It is located in fare Zone B1.
