= Ronda de la Comunicación (Madrid Metro) =

Madrid Metro station

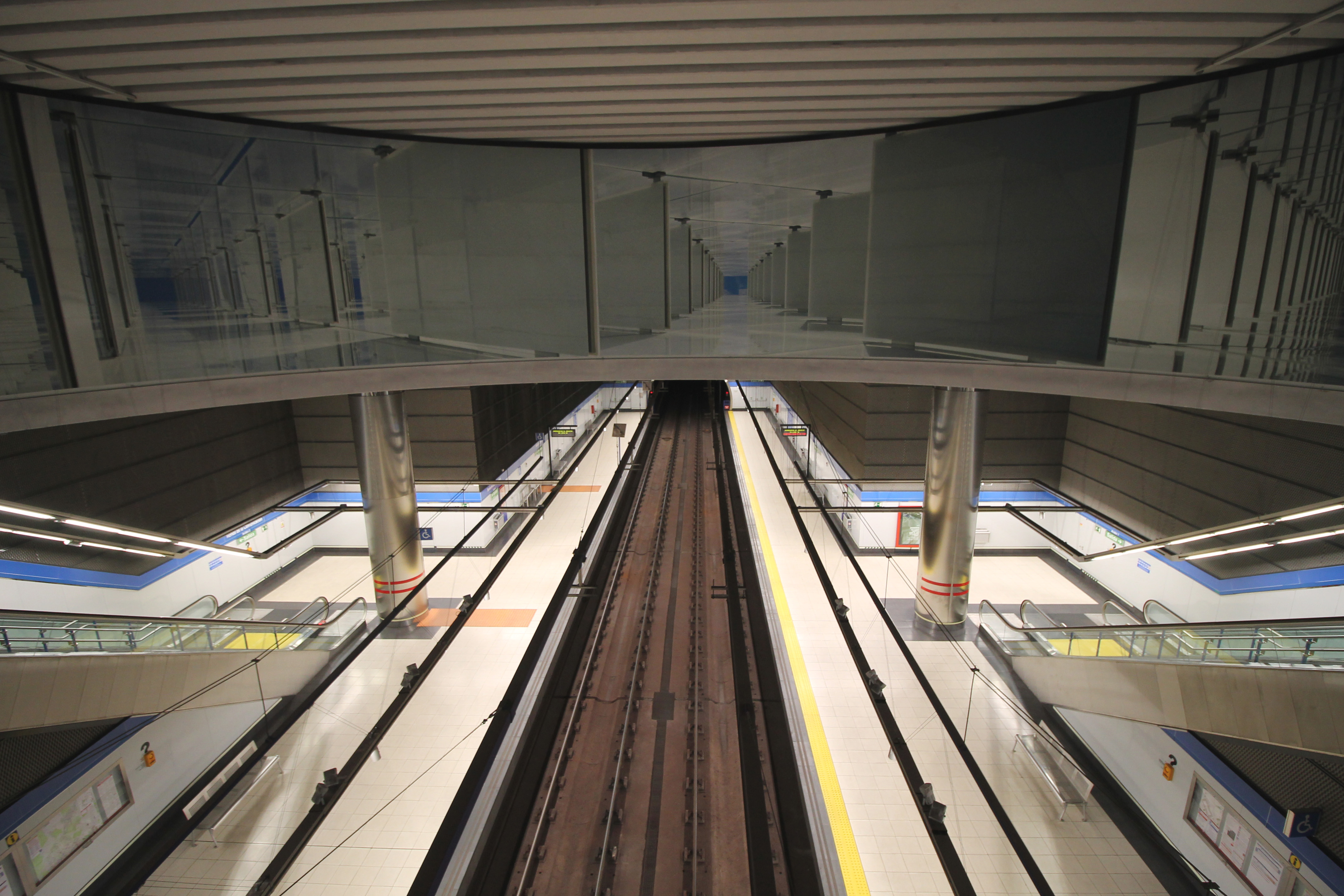

General information
- Location: Fuencarral-El Pardo, Madrid; Spain
- Coordinates: 40.5155389°N 3.6627708°W
- System: Madrid Metro station
- Owner: CRTM
- Operator: CRTM

Construction
- Accessible: yes

Other information
- Fare zone: A

History
- Opened: 26 April 2007; 19 years ago

Services
Preceding station	Madrid Metro	Following station
La Granja towards Hospital Infanta Sofía	Line 10	Las Tablas towards Puerta del Sur
Location
- Location within Madrid

Ronda de la Comunicación [ˈronda ðe la komunikaˈθjon] is a station on Line 10 of the Madrid Metro, located under the Ronda de la Comunicación ("Communication Ring Road"). It is located in fare Zone A. It is the station that serves the Distrito Telefónica office park housing the headquarters of Telefónica, S.A.
