= Fuencarral (Madrid Metro) =

Madrid Metro station

- Platforms of the station

General information
- Location: Fuencarral-El Pardo, Madrid; Spain
- Coordinates: 40.4946447°N 3.6926354°W
- System: Madrid Metro station
- Owner: CRTM
- Operator: CRTM

Construction
- Accessible: No

Other information
- Fare zone: A

History
- Opened: 10 June 1982; 44 years ago

Services
Preceding station	Madrid Metro	Following station
Tres Olivos towards Hospital Infanta Sofía	Line 10	Begoña towards Puerta del Sur
Location
- Location within Madrid

Fuencarral [fweŋkaˈral] is a station on Line 10 of the Madrid Metro, serving the Fuencarral barrio. It is located in fare Zone A.
