= Batán (Madrid Metro) =

Madrid Metro station

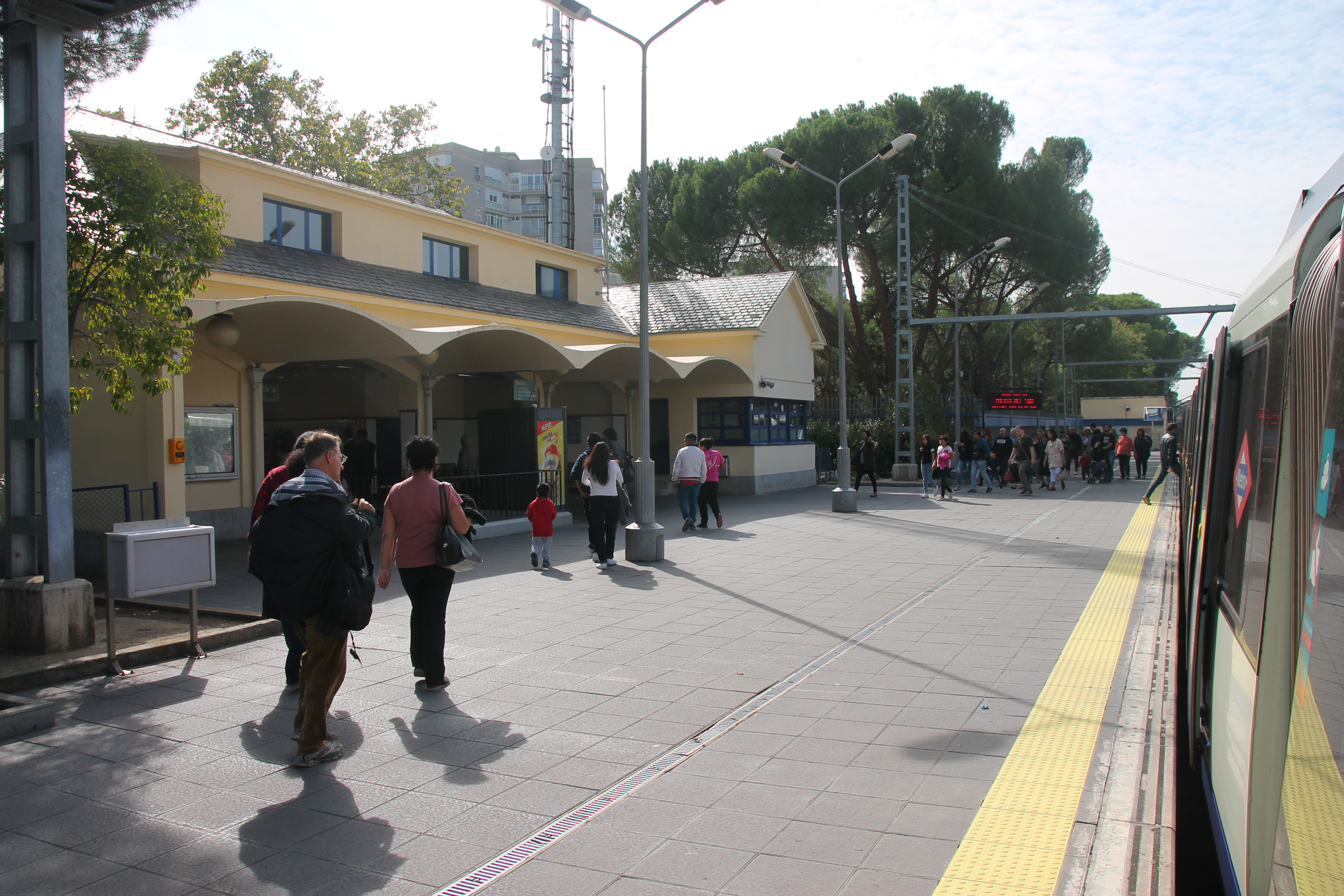
- Platform of the station

General information
- Location: Latina / Moncloa-Aravaca, Madrid; Spain
- Coordinates: 40.4078602°N 3.7531099°W
- System: Madrid Metro station
- Owner: CRTM
- Operator: CRTM

Construction
- Accessible: yes

Other information
- Fare zone: A

History
- Opened: 4 February 1961; 65 years ago

Services
Preceding station	Madrid Metro	Following station
Lago towards Hospital Infanta Sofía	Line 10	Casa de Campo towards Puerta del Sur
Location
- Location within Madrid

Batán [baˈtan] is a station on Line 10 of the Madrid Metro, serving the Venta del Batán housing development. It is located in fare Zone A.

With its neighbor Lago to the north, Batán is one of only two above-ground stations on Line 10.
