= Manuel de Falla (Madrid Metro) =

Madrid Metro station

- Platform of the station

General information
- Location: Alcobendas, Madrid; Spain
- Coordinates: 40.5504843°N 3.6468756°W
- System: Madrid Metro station
- Owner: CRTM
- Operator: CRTM

Construction
- Accessible: yes

Other information
- Fare zone: B1

History
- Opened: 26 April 2007; 19 years ago

Services
Preceding station	Madrid Metro	Following station
Baunatal towards Hospital Infanta Sofía	Line 10	Marqués de la Valdavia towards Puerta del Sur
Location
- Location within Community of Madrid

Manuel de Falla [maˈnwel de ˈfaʎa] is a station on Line 10 of the Madrid Metro, located in the municipality of Alcobendas in Madrid, Spain. It is situated on Calle de Manuel de Falla. The street is named after the composer and pianist Manuel de Falla (1876–1946). It is located in fare Zone B1.
