= Aviación Española (Madrid Metro) =

Madrid Metro station

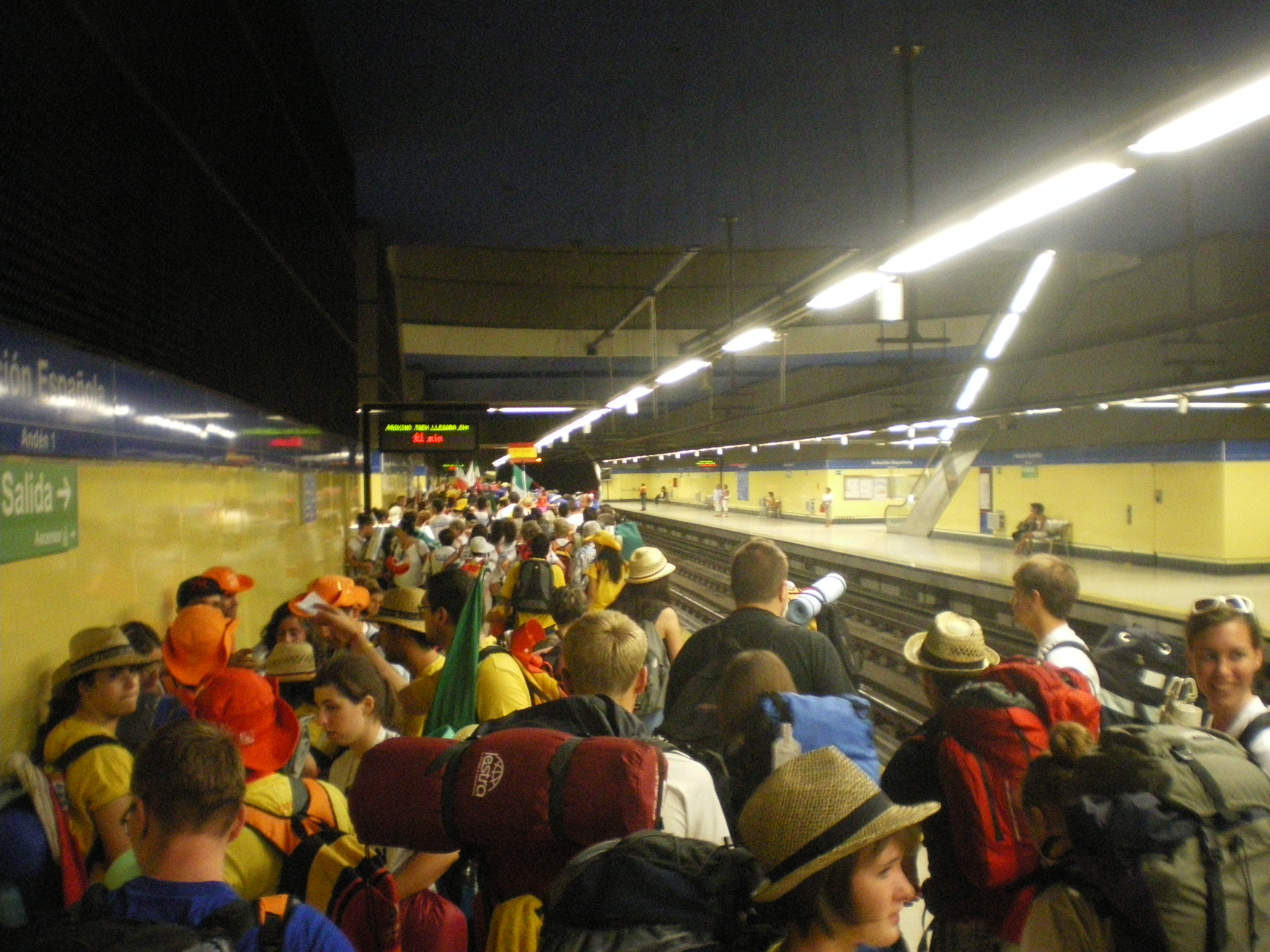

General information
- Location: Latina, Madrid; Spain
- Coordinates: 40.3836374°N 3.7839189°W
- System: Madrid Metro station
- Owner: CRTM
- Operator: CRTM

Construction
- Accessible: yes

Other information
- Fare zone: A

History
- Opened: 22 December 2006; 19 years ago

Services
Preceding station	Madrid Metro	Following station
Colonia Jardín towards Hospital Infanta Sofía	Line 10	Cuatro Vientos towards Puerta del Sur
Location
- Location within Madrid

Aviación Española ([a.βjaˈθjon es.paˈɲo.la], "Spanish Aviation") is a station on Line 10 of the Madrid Metro, named for the nearby Madrid–Cuatro Vientos Airport, an important site in the early history of Spanish aviation. It is located in fare Zone A.
