= La Moraleja (Madrid Metro) =

Madrid Metro station

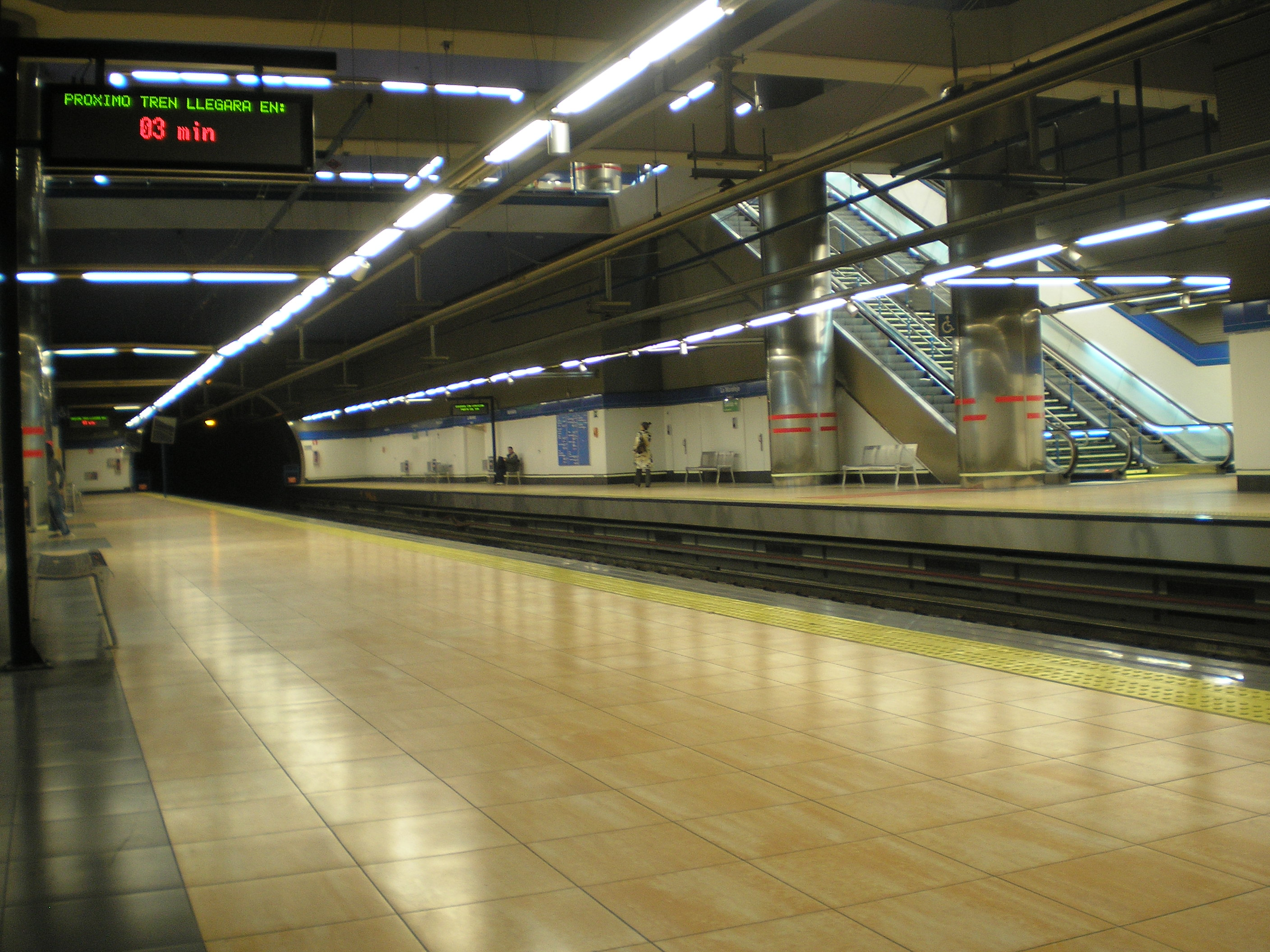

General information
- Location: Alcobendas, Madrid; Spain
- Coordinates: 40.5319526°N 3.6355634°W
- System: Madrid Metro station
- Owner: CRTM
- Operator: CRTM

Construction
- Accessible: yes

Other information
- Fare zone: B1

History
- Opened: 26 April 2007; 19 years ago

Services
Preceding station	Madrid Metro	Following station
Marqués de la Valdavia towards Hospital Infanta Sofía	Line 10	La Granja towards Puerta del Sur
Location
- Location within Community of Madrid

La Moraleja [la mo.ɾaˈle.xa] is a station on Line 10 of the Madrid Metro, serving the La Moraleja district. It is located in fare Zone B1.
