= Joaquín Vilumbrales (Madrid Metro) =

Madrid Metro station

- Platform of the station

General information
- Location: Alcorcón, Madrid; Spain
- Coordinates: 40.3498463°N 3.8071962°W
- System: Madrid Metro station
- Owner: CRTM
- Operator: CRTM

Construction
- Accessible: yes

Other information
- Fare zone: B1

History
- Opened: 11 April 2003; 23 years ago

Services
| Preceding station | Madrid Metro | Following station |
|---|---|---|
| Cuatro Vientos towards Hospital Infanta Sofía | Line 10 | Puerta del Sur Terminus |
Location
- Location within Madrid

Joaquín Vilumbrales [xoaˈkim bilumˈbɾales] is a station on Line 10 of the Madrid Metro, named for the nearby Biblioteca Municipal Joaquin Vilumbrales, a library named in turn for the politician Joaquín Vilumbrales (1941–1999). It is located in fare Zone B1.
