= Montecarmelo (Madrid Metro) =

Madrid Metro station

- Platform of the station

General information
- Location: Fuencarral-El Pardo, Madrid; Spain
- Coordinates: 40.5052554°N 3.6957517°W
- System: Madrid Metro station
- Owner: CRTM
- Operator: CRTM

Construction
- Accessible: yes

Other information
- Fare zone: A

History
- Opened: 26 April 2007; 19 years ago

Services
Preceding station	Madrid Metro	Following station
Las Tablas towards Hospital Infanta Sofía	Line 10	Tres Olivos towards Puerta del Sur
Location
- Location within Madrid

Montecarmelo (Spanish pronunciation: [ˌmontekaɾˈmelo]) is a station on Line 10 of the Madrid Metro. It is located in fare Zone A. The station serves the eponymous neighborhood of Montecarmelo, providing links to central Madrid, Alcobendas and San Sebastián de los Reyes.
