= Baunatal (Madrid Metro) =

Madrid Metro station

- Platform of the station

General information
- Location: San Sebastián de los Reyes, Madrid; Spain
- Coordinates: 40.554395°N 3.6350471°W
- System: Madrid Metro station
- Owner: CRTM
- Operator: CRTM

Construction
- Accessible: yes

Other information
- Fare zone: B1

History
- Opened: 26 April 2007; 19 years ago

Services
Preceding station	Madrid Metro	Following station
Reyes Católicos towards Hospital Infanta Sofía	Line 10	Manuel de Falla towards Puerta del Sur
Location
- Location within Community of Madrid

Baunatal [bawnaˈtal] is a station on Line 10 of the Madrid Metro. It is located in fare Zone B1.

The station was named after the Avenida de Baunatal, which in turn got its name from the Hessian town of Baunatal, a sister city of San Sebastián de los Reyes since 1990.
