= Santiago Bernabéu (disambiguation) =

Santiago Bernabéu (1895–1978) was a Spanish footballer and president of Real Madrid.

Santiago Bernabéu may also refer to:

- Bernabéu (stadium), the football stadium in Madrid of Real Madrid CF named after the above
- Santiago Bernabéu Trophy, a Spanish football summer trophy named after the above
- Santiago Bernabéu (Madrid Metro), a metro station outside the Santiago Bernabéu Stadium
