= Tres Olivos (Madrid Metro) =

Madrid Metro station

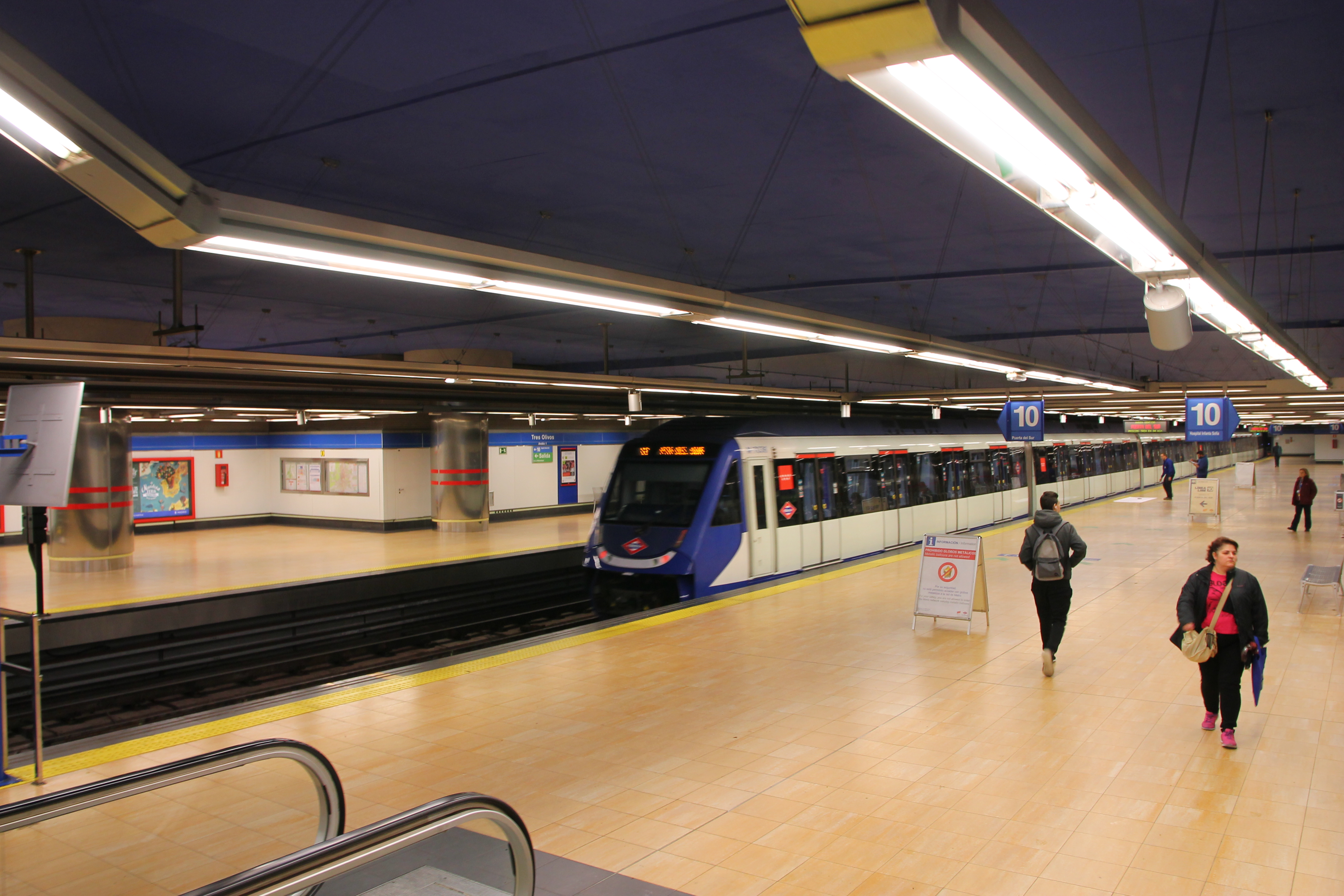

General information
- Location: Fuencarral-El Pardo, Madrid; Spain
- Coordinates: 40.5012042°N 3.6952016°W
- System: Madrid Metro station
- Owner: CRTM
- Operator: CRTM

Construction
- Accessible: yes

Other information
- Fare zone: A

History
- Opened: 26 April 2007; 19 years ago

Services
Preceding station	Madrid Metro	Following station
Montecarmelo towards Hospital Infanta Sofía	Line 10	Fuencarral towards Puerta del Sur
Location
- Location within Madrid

Tres Olivos [ˈtɾes oˈliβos] is a station on Line 10 of the Madrid Metro, serving the Tres Olivos ("three olive trees") development. It is located in fare Zone A.

As the interchange station from Line 10A to 10B (MetroNorte) toward Hospital Infanta Sofía, it has two platforms.
