= Lago (Madrid Metro) =

Madrid Metro station

- Train of series 7000 in the station

General information
- Location: Moncloa-Aravaca, Madrid; Spain
- Coordinates: 40.4164141°N 3.7356311°W
- System: Madrid Metro station
- Owner: CRTM
- Operator: CRTM

Construction
- Accessible: yes

Other information
- Fare zone: A

History
- Opened: 4 February 1961; 65 years ago

Services
Preceding station	Madrid Metro	Following station
Príncipe Pío towards Hospital Infanta Sofía	Line 10	Batán towards Puerta del Sur
Location
- Location within Madrid

Lago ([ˈlaɣo], "Lake," for the Lago de la Casa de Campo) is a station on Line 10 of the Madrid Metro. It is located in fare Zone A.

With its neighbor Batán to the south, Lago is one of only two above-ground stations on Line 10.
