= Begoña (Madrid Metro) =

Madrid Metro station

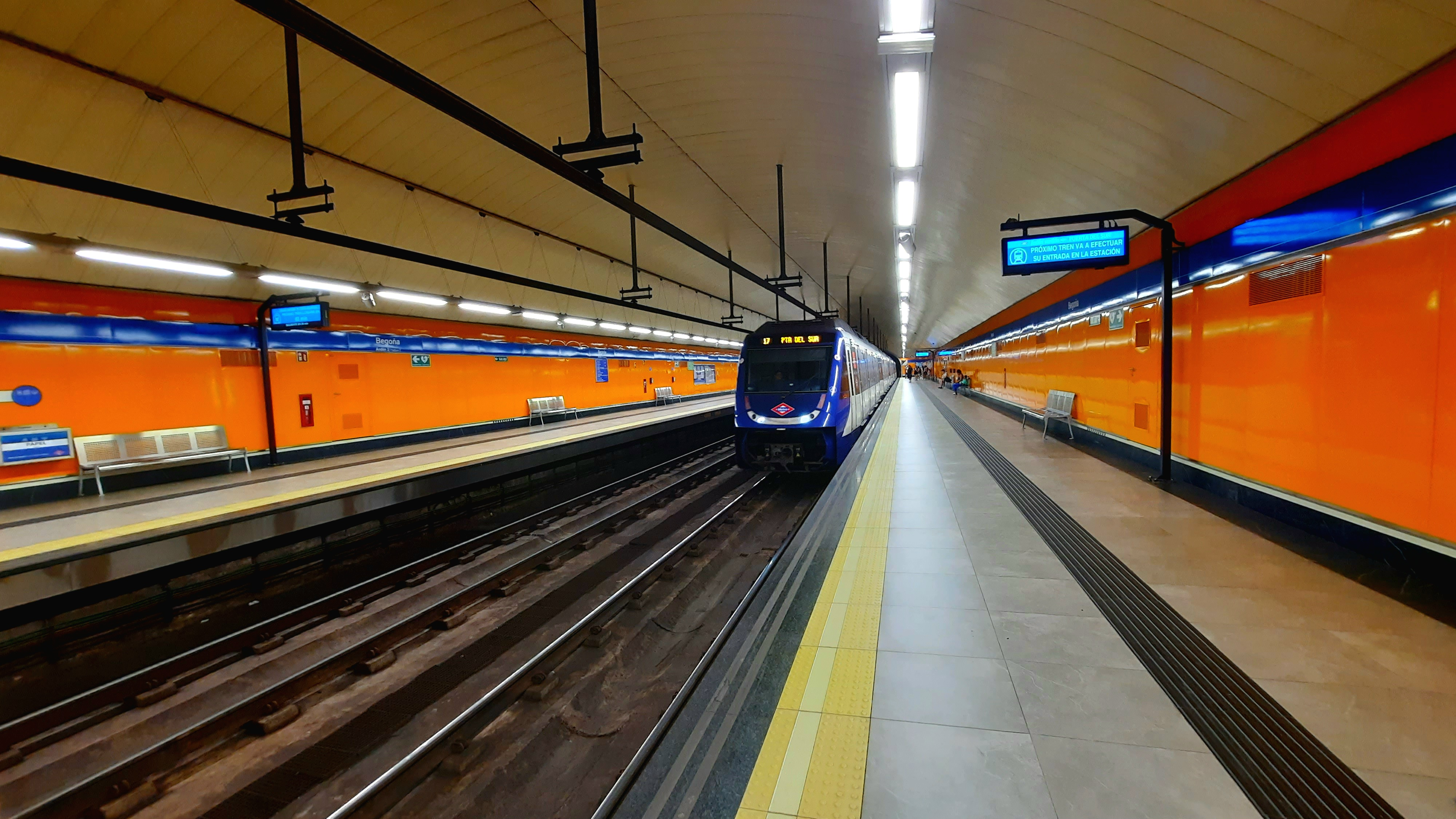
- Platforms of the station

General information
- Location: Chamartín / Fuencarral-El Pardo, Madrid; Spain
- Coordinates: 40.4804137°N 3.6858447°W
- System: Madrid Metro station
- Owner: CRTM
- Operator: CRTM

Construction
- Accessible: Yes

Other information
- Fare zone: A

History
- Opened: 10 June 1982; 44 years ago

Services
Preceding station	Madrid Metro	Following station
Fuencarral towards Hospital Infanta Sofía	Line 10	Chamartín towards Puerta del Sur
Location
- Location within Madrid

Begoña [beˈɣoɲa] is a station on Line 10 of the Madrid Metro, serving the Colonia Virgen de Begoña ("Virgin of Begoña colony") development. It is located in fare Zone A. It lies directly below the major road Paseo de la Castellana which separates the districts of Fuencarral-El Pardo (La Paz neighbourhood) to the west and Chamartín to the east, though access is only via the west side of the road (a pedestrian subway access allows access to the station from the east).

== History ==
The station was opened on 10 June 1982, as part of the original line 8. until 22 January 1998, when it became part of line 10.

From 9 to 18 of August 2024, the Fuencarral - Chamartín section of Line 10 was closed for accessibility works at this station. A replacement bus service was available, stopping at the affected stations, at no cost to Metro users.

Since 28 May 2025, the station has been fully accessible thanks to the installation of seven elevators.
