= La Granja =

La Granja (Spanish for "the farm", cf. grange, monastic grange) may refer to:

- La Granja, Chile, a commune in Santiago Province, Santiago Metropolitan Region
  - La Granja metro station (Santiago)
- La Granja, Spain, a municipality of Cáceres province
- Royal Palace of La Granja de San Ildefonso in Spain
  - La Granja de San Ildefonso, the town connected to it
- La Granja (Madrid Metro), Madrid, Spain
- La Granja, a Metrovalencia station, Spain
- La granja (Chilean TV series), a 2005 Chilean reality television series
- La granja (1989 TV series), a 1989–1992 Spanish soap opera television series that was broadcast by the Catalan-language channel TV3
- La Granja (2004 TV series), a 2004–2005 Spanish reality television series
- La Granja (album), a 2009 album by Mexican band Los Tigres del Norte
  - "La Granja" (song), a 2009 song by Mexican band Los Tigres del Norte

== See also ==
- Granja (disambiguation)
