= Reyes Católicos (Madrid Metro) =

Madrid Metro station

- Platform of the station

General information
- Location: San Sebastián de los Reyes, Madrid; Spain
- Coordinates: 40.5503789°N 3.6233956°W
- System: Madrid Metro station
- Owner: CRTM
- Operator: CRTM

Construction
- Accessible: yes

Other information
- Fare zone: B1

History
- Opened: 26 April 2007; 19 years ago

Services
Preceding station	Madrid Metro	Following station
Hospital Infanta Sofía Terminus	Line 10	Baunatal towards Puerta del Sur
Location
- Location within Community of Madrid

Reyes Católicos [ˈreʝes kaˈtolikos] is a station on Line 10 of the Madrid Metro, named for the nearby Avenida de los Reyes Católicos ("Avenue of the Catholic Monarchs"). It is located in fare Zone B1.
