= Cuatro Vientos (Madrid Metro) =

Madrid Metro station

General information
- Location: Latina, Madrid; Spain
- Coordinates: 40.3777027°N 3.791519°W
- System: Madrid Metro station
- Owner: CRTM
- Operator: CRTM

Construction
- Accessible: yes

Other information
- Fare zone: A

History
- Opened: 11 April 2003; 23 years ago

Services
Preceding station	Madrid Metro	Following station
Aviación Española towards Hospital Infanta Sofía	Line 10	Joaquín Vilumbrales towards Puerta del Sur
Out of system interchange
Preceding station	Cercanías Madrid	Following station
S. José de Valderas towards Móstoles-El Soto	C-5	Las Águilas towards Humanes
Location
- Location within Madrid

Cuatro Vientos [ˈkwatɾo ˈβjentos] is a station on Line 10 of the Madrid Metro, named for the nearby Madrid–Cuatro Vientos Airport. It is located in fare Zone A.

The station has two levels, with the surface level serving the C-5 Cercanías line.
