= Vientos =

Vientos is a surname of Spanish origin. Notable people with the surname include:

- Mark Vientos (born December 11, 1999) American baseball player
- Nilita Vientós Gastón (Born June 5, 1903 - July 10, 1989) Puerto Rican educator

== See also ==
- Cuatro Vientos (disambiguation)
