= Santiago Bernabéu (Madrid Metro) =

Madrid Metro station

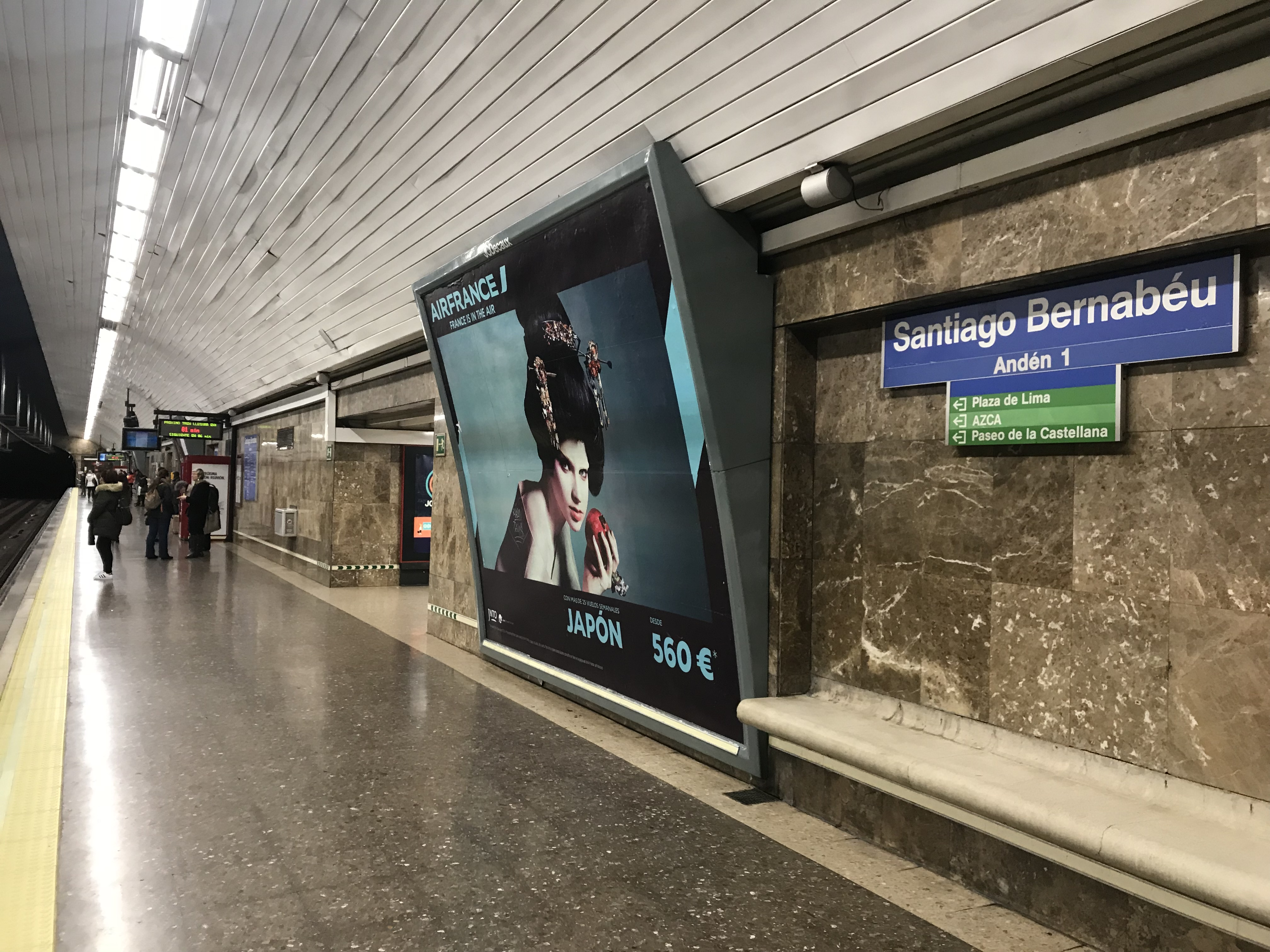

General information
- Location: Chamartín / Tetuán, Madrid; Spain
- Coordinates: 40.4521419°N 3.6903855°W
- System: Madrid Metro station
- Owner: CRTM
- Operator: CRTM

Construction
- Accessible: No

Other information
- Fare zone: A

History
- Opened: 10 June 1982; 44 years ago
- Rebuilt: 2026–2027

Services
Preceding station	Madrid Metro	Following station
Cuzco towards Hospital Infanta Sofía	Line 10	Nuevos Ministerios towards Puerta del Sur
Location
- Location within Madrid

Santiago Bernabéu [sanˈtjaɣo βeɾnaˈβew] is a metro station on Line 10 of the Madrid Metro. It is located in fare Zone A. It is located next to the Bernabéu, home stadium of Real Madrid, named after the club president Santiago Bernabéu.

The station was opened on 10 June 1982, only three days before the start of the 1982 FIFA World Cup, which Spain were hosting. Having been part of the Madrid Metro's first Line 8, the station was originally called "Lima" (after the Plaza de Lima nearby, itself named after Lima, Peru), but took on its current name on 18 December 1997. During 2026, it will be closed, demolished and rebuilt bigger to reopen in 2027 as Bernabéu. A special free bus service is being provided in the interim.
