= Ensanche Sur =

Coordinates: 40°19′50″N 3°49′53″W

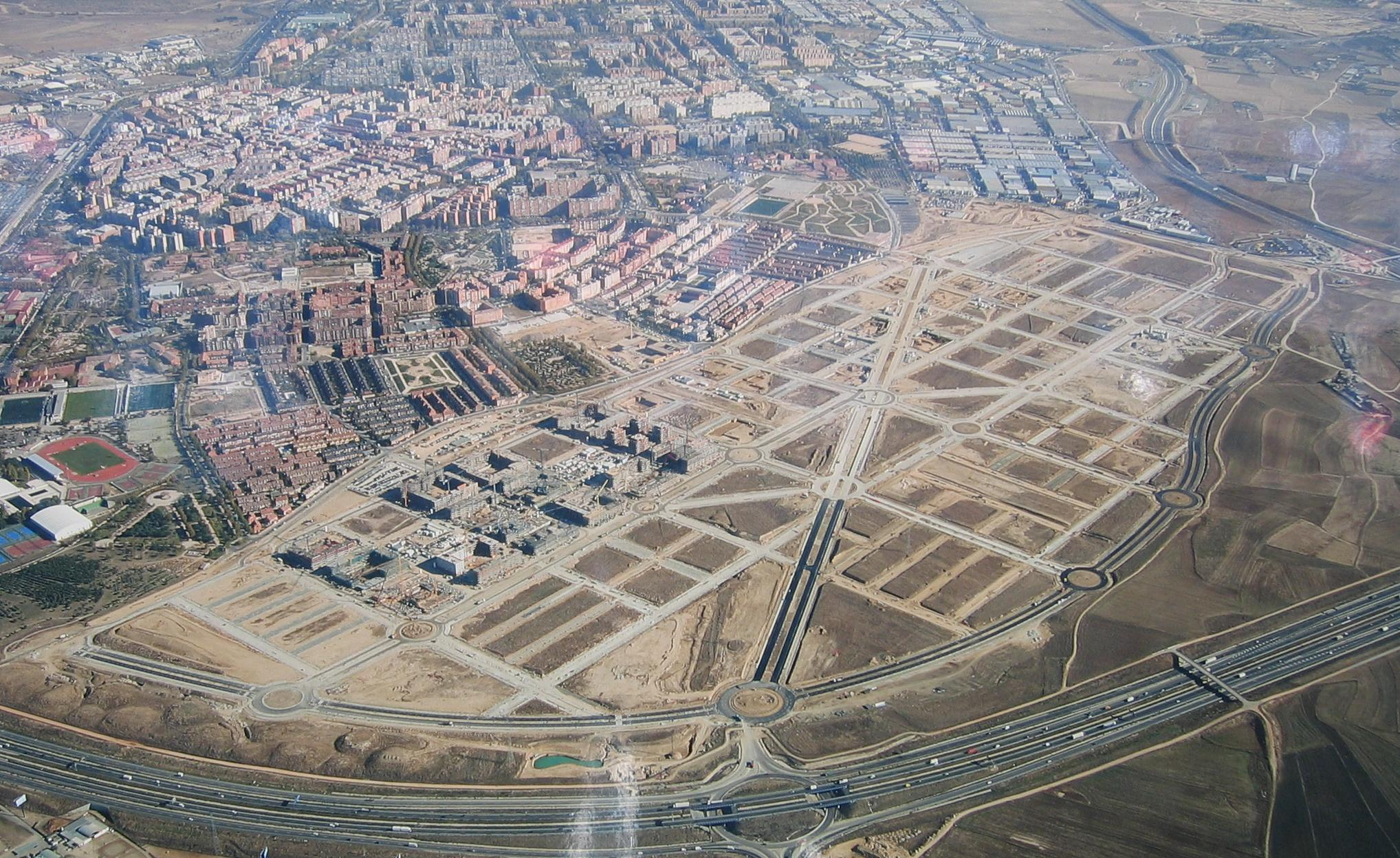
- Ensanche Sur (aerial view).
- Interactive map of Ensanche Sur
- Country: Spain
- Autonomous community: Madrid
- City: Alcorcón
- Postal code: 28922

Ensanche Sur de Alcorcón is a new neighbourhood, currently under construction, placed on the South of Alcorcón (Madrid, Spain). It borders on the South with the city of Fuenlabrada and on the South-East with the city of Móstoles. The total area is 1,981,469 m^{2}, including 500,000 m^{2} for green zones, and around 300,000 m^{2} for social public purposes.

It will have around 6,000 subsidized houses, and around 1,000 houses with public prices for rental. This supposes the 85% of the total number of houses constructed in this place. All the houses have been designed based on bioclimatic architecture criteria.

== See also ==
- Neighbourhood association
- Forums with discussions about Ensanche Sur
