= Bernabéu (stadium) =

Stadium in Madrid, Spain

Coordinates: 40°27′11″N 3°41′18″W

- Santiago Bernabéu; Nuevo Chamartín
- UEFA
- Interactive map of Bernabéu
- Full name: Bernabéu
- Former names: Estadio Real Madrid Club de Fútbol (1947–1955); Estadio Santiago Bernabéu (1955–2025)
- Address: Avenida de Concha Espina
- Location: Madrid, Spain
- Capacity: 83,186 List: 100,000 (1947–1952) 125,000 (1952–1978) 90,000 (1978–1994) 110,000 (1994–1999) 81,044 (1999–2020) 83,186 (since 2024)
- Executive suites: 245
- Roof: Retractable
- Surface: Mixto hybrid grass
- Record attendance: 129,690 (Real Madrid v. AC Milan, 19 April 1956)
- Field size: 105 m × 68 m (344 ft × 223 ft)
- Public transit: at Santiago Bernabéu

Construction
- Built: October 1944 – December 1947
- Opened: 14 December 1947; 78 years ago
- Renovated: 1982, 2001, 2019–2024
- Expanded: 1952, 1992, 1994, 2011
- Reopened: 23 December 2023; 2 years ago
- Cost: 288,342,653 Ptas (€1,732,943); Renovations: 1982: $4.7 million 2000: €127 million 2024: €1.76 billion
- Architects: Manuel Muñoz Monasterio; Luis Alemany Soler; Antonio Lamela (expansion)

Tenants
- Real Madrid (1947–present); Spain national football team (selected matches)

Website
- Bernabéu

Bernabéu (Spanish: El Bernabéu [βeɾnaˈβew]), formerly known as Santiago Bernabéu Stadium, is a retractable roof football stadium in the district of Chamartín, Madrid, Spain. With a seating capacity of 83,186 following its extensive renovation completed in late 2024, the stadium has the second-largest seating capacity for a football stadium in Spain, behind Camp Nou in Barcelona. It has been the home stadium of Real Madrid since its completion in 1947.

Named after former Real Madrid player and president Santiago Bernabéu (1895–1978), the stadium is one of the world's most famous football venues. It has hosted the final of the European Cup/UEFA Champions League on four occasions: in 1957, 1969, 1980 and 2010. The stadium also hosted the second leg of the 2018 Copa Libertadores Finals, making Santiago Bernabéu the only stadium to host finals of both competitions. The final matches for the 1964 European Nations' Cup and the 1982 FIFA World Cup were also held at the Bernabéu, making it the first stadium in Europe to host both a UEFA Euro final and a FIFA World Cup final.

== History ==
=== Origins and construction ===
In the early 1940s, the old Campo de Chamartín had become too small for the growing population of Madrid and the increasing popularity of football. Despite successive renovations that had expanded its capacity to 25,000 seats, the stadium was still insufficient for the club's needs. Faced with this situation, in the spring of 1943, President Antonio Santos Peralba expressed the need to build a new stadium with an initial capacity of 40,000 spectators, although the club's financial difficulties raised uncertainties about its realization.

With the arrival of Santiago Bernabéu to the presidency in September 1943, the plan for the new stadium gained decisive and much more ambitious momentum. In his first meeting with the board of directors, Bernabéu declared: "Gentlemen, we need a bigger field and we are going to build it". Bernabéu's vision was to build an even larger stadium than the one proposed by Peralba, with a capacity close to 75,000 spectators. Bernabéu firmly believed that a larger stadium would allow the club to raise more money, which in turn would enable the club to grow, sign better players, and attract more fans, creating a virtuous cycle that would benefit the team in the long run. On 1 November 1943, the board of directors visited the land adjacent to the Campo de Chamartín, located in the extension of the Paseo de la Castellana, to analyze its possible expansion. These lands belonged to the "Villa Ulpiana" estate and another known as "Entrecanales", owned by the Maqueda and Chávarri families. Shortly thereafter, negotiations began to acquire them for a total cost of 3,000,000 pesetas.

On 22 June 1944, the land acquisitions were formalized before a notary: 256,667 square feet for 2,000,000 pesetas from the Ruiz del Villar family and 93,877 square feet for 1,001,069 pesetas from the Maqueda and Chávarri families. Additionally, the necessary expropriations for the urbanization of the area, including the future streets Concha Espina and Plaza de los Sagrados Corazones, cost 1,000,000 pesetas.

To choose the design for the new stadium, a Competition of Ideas and Sketches was organized, in which renowned architects participated. The architects Pedro Muguruza and Javier Barroso, former goalkeepers of Athletic de Madrid and friends of Bernabéu, were part of the jury along with board members Fernando de Cárcer Disdier, first vice president, and Pedro Méndez Cuesta, board member responsible for the field and an architect by profession. In September 1944, after evaluating the seven submitted projects, the jury awarded the first prize to the design of Manuel Muñoz Monasterio and Luis Alemany Soler. The award-winning works were exhibited at the Círculo de Bellas Artes, where they sparked great interest and debate among fans.

On 27 October 1944, the land was blessed, and construction was symbolically initiated with a groundbreaking strike by Santiago Bernabéu.

The financing of the construction presented significant challenges due to the distrust of members and banking entities. Despite the skepticism of many people, including some members and supporters, regarding the project's feasibility, Bernabéu remained steadfast in his purpose. In a context where banks did not consider football a safe investment and where official support from sports organizations was not obtainable, Bernabéu delegated to treasurer Luis Corrales Ferras the task of designing an innovative financing plan. This plan involved the issuance of bonds with mortgage guarantees on the club's properties.

The next step was crucial: Bernabéu presented this plan to Rafael Salgado, president of Banco Mercantil e Industrial and a Real Madrid supporter. Thanks to Bernabéu's passionate and detailed explanation, Salgado agreed to finance the project, convinced of the viability and potential of the new stadium. This decision was crucial for the project's realization, and in recognition of his support, one of the streets adjacent to the stadium bears his name.

The financing plan was structured into three staggered bond issues:

- First issue of 20,000 bonds for a total of 10,000,000 pesetas on 9 November 1944.
- Second issue of 30,000 bonds for 15,000,000 pesetas on 18 March 1946.
- Third issue of 10,000 bonds totaling 5,000,000 pesetas on 8 October 1947.

All the issues were covered on the day they were released to the Stock Market, thanks to the enthusiasm and confidence of the members, even the most modest ones. The plan was a complete success and allowed for staggered financing adjusted to the construction needs.

The construction was awarded to the company Huarte y Compañía, S.A., beginning in June 1945 under the direction of architects Alemany and Muñoz Monasterio and with the collaboration of civil engineer Carlos Fernández Casado. Over 30 months, the works faced numerous obstacles, from the shortage of basic materials in post-war Spain to technical difficulties due to a nearby railway link popularly known as the "tunnel of laughter". However, the project progressed with enthusiasm and dedication.

The construction of the new field took place on the grounds of the old field and on the lands of Villa Ulpiana, which could have disrupted the club's life. However, this only happened from 1946 when Real Madrid was forced to play home games at the Stadium Metropolitano during the 1946–47 season and in five matches of the 1947–48 season. Despite these inconveniences, Real Madrid maintained its sports activities while the new stadium took shape over part of the old site and on the adjacent lands.

This is how Fernando de Cárcer Disdier, the club's first vice president, summarized the development of the construction in 1947:

We encountered numerous difficulties in transporting materials. Keep in mind that we used 18,000 m^{2} of gravel, 24,000 m^{2} of sand, 2,000,000 bricks, 900 m^{2} of wood, and moved about 150,000 m^{3} of earth. For this, we had to load 82,000 trucks of 4 tons each… On average, 150 workers worked per day, so we had to pay about 315,000 workdays. For the services and sanitation network, we installed 4.5 kilometers of stoneware, iron, and lead pipes, with 90 porcelain sinks, 125 toilets, 365 urinals, and 46 showers. There is enough space to install offices, restaurants, warehouses, and other services, but for now, we have limited ourselves to the essentials for football: 4 dressing rooms for players with their corresponding showers, a swimming pool, a massage room, and a first aid kit. An infirmary with 6 beds, a treatment room, and an emergency operating room. A dressing room for the referee with all its services. A wardrobe room with a clothing repair workshop and iron. A shoemaker, laundry, and a large gymnasium. A telephone exchange and a radio amplification center… Additionally, a room for detainees has been built, thus avoiding the need for law enforcement to be distracted by escorting them. Regarding the costs, around 16,000,000 pesetas were budgeted, but this has increased due to perfectly justified reasons, such as the nature of the terrain, the rise in material prices over these 30 months, more than 25% in some cases, and the new labor regulations in the construction industry that required safety measures not contemplated in the project. Currently (in 1947), if we were to start the construction of the stadium, its cost would rise to 45,000,000 pesetas. The amortization is planned to be completed in 20 years with our own resources, and without having started using the new field, we have already begun to amortize. This is a great success for Real Madrid and the people of Madrid.

— Fernando de Cárcer Disdier

The total cost of the works, in round numbers, was broken down into the following items:

1. Land. Acquisitions, capital gains, real rights, stamps, writing expenses, cancellation of commitments, and lifting of the mortgage on the old Chamartín: 4,500,000 pesetas.
2. Loans. Costs of the same: 2,000,000 pesetas.
3. Works. Material execution of the stadium: 28,000,000 pesetas. Execution of the office: 1,500,000 pesetas.
4. Fees. Architects, quantity surveyors, and awards from the Ideas and Sketches Competition: 1,300,000 pesetas.
5. Compensation for Expropriations of land carried out by the City Council: 1,000,000 pesetas.

Total disbursed: 38,300,000 pesetas (230,183 euros).

=== Opening ===
The stadium was inaugurated on 14 December 1947 with a match between Real Madrid and the Portuguese side Os Belenenses. After the preliminaries, at 15:30, referee Pedro Escartín from the Madrid school started the match. Real Madrid striker Sabino Barinaga scored the first goal in the 15th minute with a header. At the end of the match, Barinaga received a recognition pennant. Afterward, players and managers of both teams celebrated with a dinner. The first official match took place on 28 December 1947 on matchday 12 of La Liga against Athletic Club, which had been postponed due to the inauguration of the stadium. The match was refereed by José Fombona Fernández from the Asturian school and ended with a 5–1 victory for Los Blancos. The first goal was scored in the 4th minute by Madrid midfielder Chus Alonso after receiving a pass from Barinaga.

The stadium's official name at the time was Estadio Real Madrid Club de Fútbol, although it continued to be known among fans as Nuevo Estadio Chamartín (English: New Chamartín Stadium) or simply Chamartín. The stadium had an initial capacity of 75,145 spectators, 27,645 of which had seats (7,125 covered) and 47,500 for standing fans.

=== 1950s ===
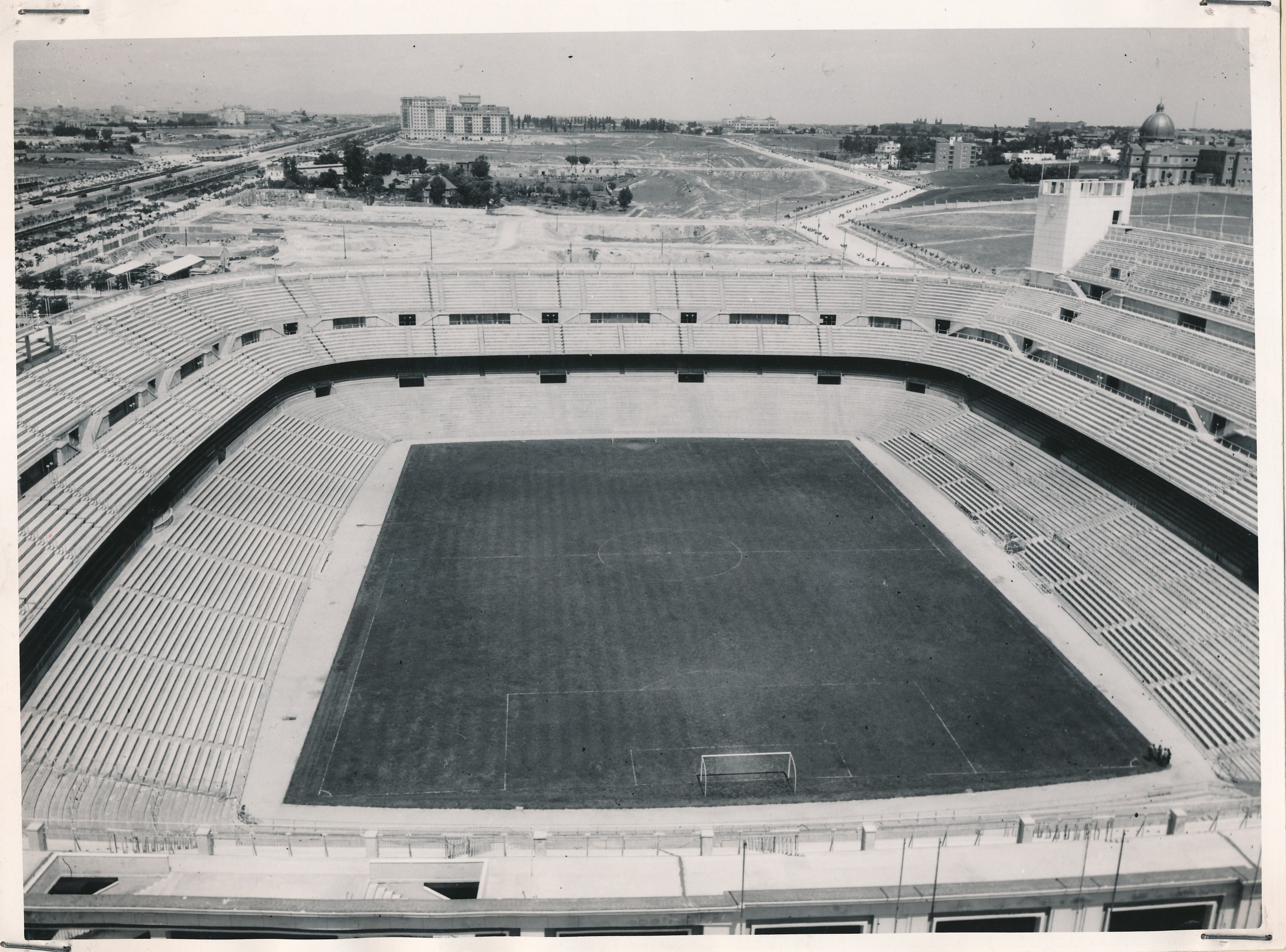
The stadium in 1955

The first major renovation occurred in 1955. On 19 June of that year, the stadium expanded to accommodate 125,000 spectators. Thus, the Madrid coliseum became the biggest stadium of all the participants of the newly established European Cup.

On 4 January 1955, after the General Assembly of Members Compromisaros, it was decided that the stadium adopt its present name in honour of club president Santiago Bernabéu.

In March 1957, floodlights were installed to allow nighttime games. On 18 May of the same year, the new floodlights were officially inaugurated in a game against Brazilian club Sport Recife, which Real Madrid won 5–3.

=== 1960s and 1970s ===
In 1965, the transfer of all the club's offices to the stadium was completed, which previously had been moved between multiple venues in the capital.

On 14 December 1972, coinciding with the 25th anniversary of the Santiago Bernabéu's inauguration, the first electronic scoreboard was installed inside the stadium and later utilized for the first time in a friendly match against the same rival that Madrid faced in 1947, the Portuguese Belenenses. The match ended with a 2–1 Real victory. Days before the scoreboard had already been used for the farewell ceremony of the Madrid legend Paco Gento.

=== 1980s ===
The next big changes did not occur until the hosting of the 1982 FIFA World Cup in Spain. The stadium had to adapt to the changing times and with this, architects Rafael Luis Alemany and Manuel Salinas were hired for the stadium's renovation project. The brothers were sons of Luis Alemany Soler, who carried out the original construction project next to Muñoz Monasterio. The work lasted 16 months and had a cost of 704 million pesetas (US $4.7 million), of which 530 million was paid by the City of Madrid.

The improvements included a number of points. First, FIFA forced two-thirds of the seating area to be covered. For this reason, Real Madrid installed a roof covering the perimeter of the first and second tiers of seating, except the east side. The stadium's capacity was reduced from 120,000 to 90,000 spectators, starting downsizing in 1978. 24,550 of which were covered by the new roof. The project also involved remodeling the façade, the installation of new electronic signs in the north and south ends, as well as the renovation of the press areas, lockers rooms, access, and ancillary areas.

The stadium hosted four matches in the World Cup: three second-round Group Two matches (West Germany vs. England, West Germany vs. Spain, and Spain vs. England) and the prestigious final match (Italy vs. West Germany). The final between Italy and Germany was played in front of a sold out stadium of 90,000 people.

=== 1990s ===
Following a series of spectator fatalities in the 1980s (most notably the Heysel Stadium in Belgium and the Hillsborough Stadium in England), English authorities released the Taylor Report on how to improve football spectator safety in English venues. UEFA followed suit across Europe. The stadium was forced to create separate shortcuts to different stadium sections and seats for all spectators.

In 1992, the board of Ramón Mendoza awarded an expansion and renovation project to Gines Navarro Construcciones, S.A. The work started on 7 February 1992 and concluded on 7 May 1994 with a final cost of more than 5 billion pesetas, substantially raising the debt of the club, which no longer had any institutional support. The work concluded with the creation of an amphitheater on the west side and in the foundations, as well as the opening of the new commercial center, "La esquina del Bernabéu". In total, 20,200 upgraded seats were installed, with each seat having a tilt of 87 degrees, ensuring a perfect view and proximity to the pitch. In addition, four entrance towers were erected on the outside, each with two staircases and a central spiral ramp, so the spectators could access the new tier and exit more quickly.

With the new structure, the height of the stadium was increased from 22 m to 45 m. This caused problems during the winter, leaving two-thirds of the field of play in the shade. This lack of sunlight led to grass deterioration on the pitch. For this reason, a polypropylene pipe network was installed at a 20 cm depth under the pitch. At over 30 km long the pipe system circulates hot water, keeping the turf from freezing in cold temperatures.

Also, due to the height of the stand, it was necessary to improve and increase the lighting capability. A retractable protective roof was also installed to protect the fans from the elements. After the renovation, the stadium's capacity was 106,000 spectators.

In 1997, with Lorenzo Sanz as president, UEFA required the Santiago Bernabéu to adopt an all-seating arrangement, bringing its capacity down from 106,000 to 74,328 spectators.

On 20 May 1999, the Tour Bernabéu opened, along with the club museum. The Bernabéu Tour allows visitors to "experience the stadium from the perspective of Real Madrid players and coaches", offering an inside look into the world of the popular Spanish team.

=== 2000s ===
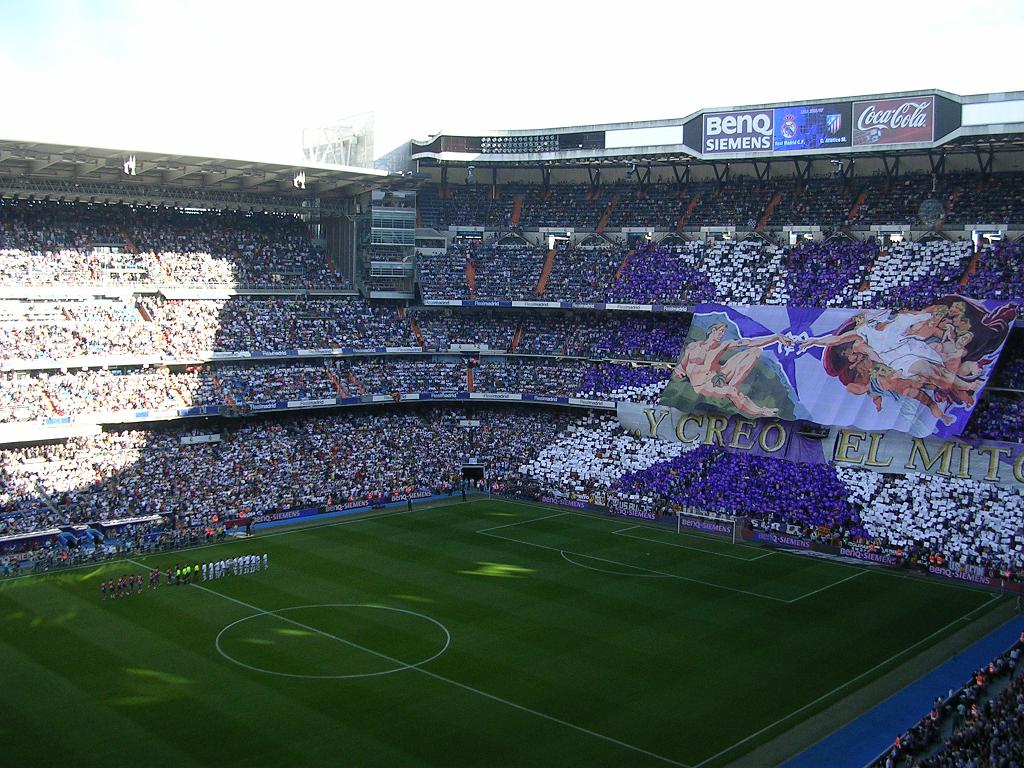
View of the stadium during the Madrid derby in the 2006–07 La Liga

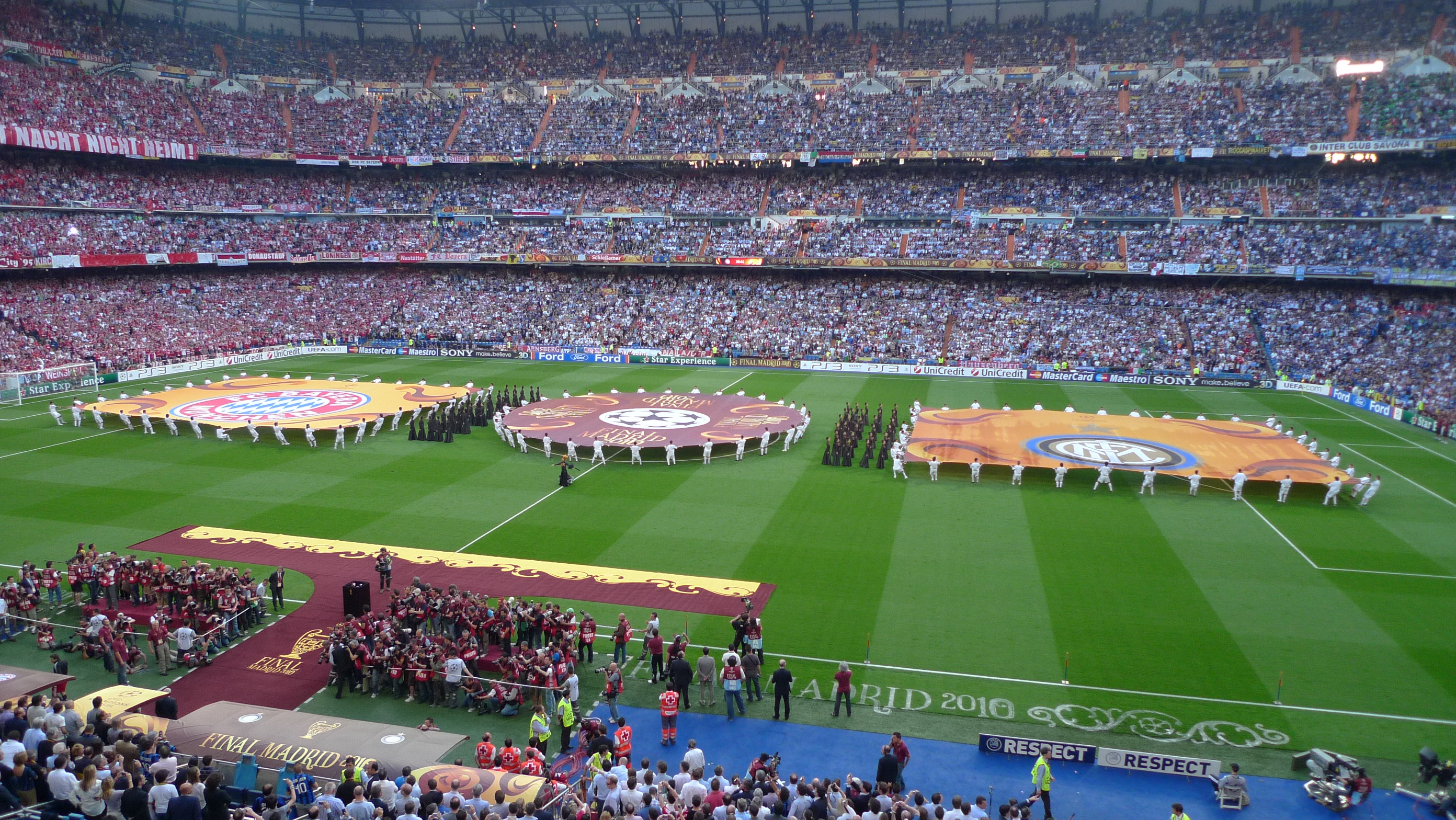
2010 UEFA Champions League final opening ceremony

As the club kept growing in all regards, thoughts for further changes to the stadium appeared. When Florentino Pérez became the president of the club, he launched a "Master Plan" with one goal: to improve the comfort of the Santiago Bernabéu and the quality of its facilities, and maximise revenue for the stadium.

Pérez invested €127 million in five years (2001–2006) by adding an expansion to the east side of the stadium, as well as adding a new façade on Father Damien street, new boxes and VIP areas, new dressing rooms, a new stage in honour of the east side, a new press area (also located on the east side), a new audio system, new bars, integration of heating in the stands, panoramic lifts, new restaurants, escalators in the tower access, and implementation of the multipurpose building in Father Damien street. Following the enlargement of the lateral east side and the creation of new galleries, the capacity of the Santiago Bernabéu was expanded to 80,354, all seated.

After these renovations, on 14 November 2007, one month before the 60th anniversary of the stadium's opening, UEFA awarded the Santiago Bernabéu the category of Elite Stadium and designated it as the venue for the 2010 UEFA Champions League final.

=== 2010s and 2020s ===
In the summer of 2011, expansion work was carried out in the first amphitheater, adding an additional row to the overhang of the grandstand, which increased the capacity by 900 seats, reaching a total capacity of 81,044 spectators. In December 2018, the Santiago Bernabéu Stadium was selected as the venue for the second leg of the Copa Libertadores de América final, becoming the first stadium in the world to host the final of four of the five most important tournaments in the world: the FIFA World Cup, the UEFA European Championship, the Copa América, the Copa Libertadores de América, and the UEFA Champions League.

==== Renovation (2019–2024) ====
After investing a total of 256 million euros since 2000, the board of directors, led by Florentino Pérez, decided to take advantage of the stadium's prime location to launch an ambitious renovation project with a dual objective: to transform the Santiago Bernabéu into a global icon of sport architecture and to make it one of the club's main sources of direct revenue, allowing it to continue competing economically with clubs owned by large private capital in the future.

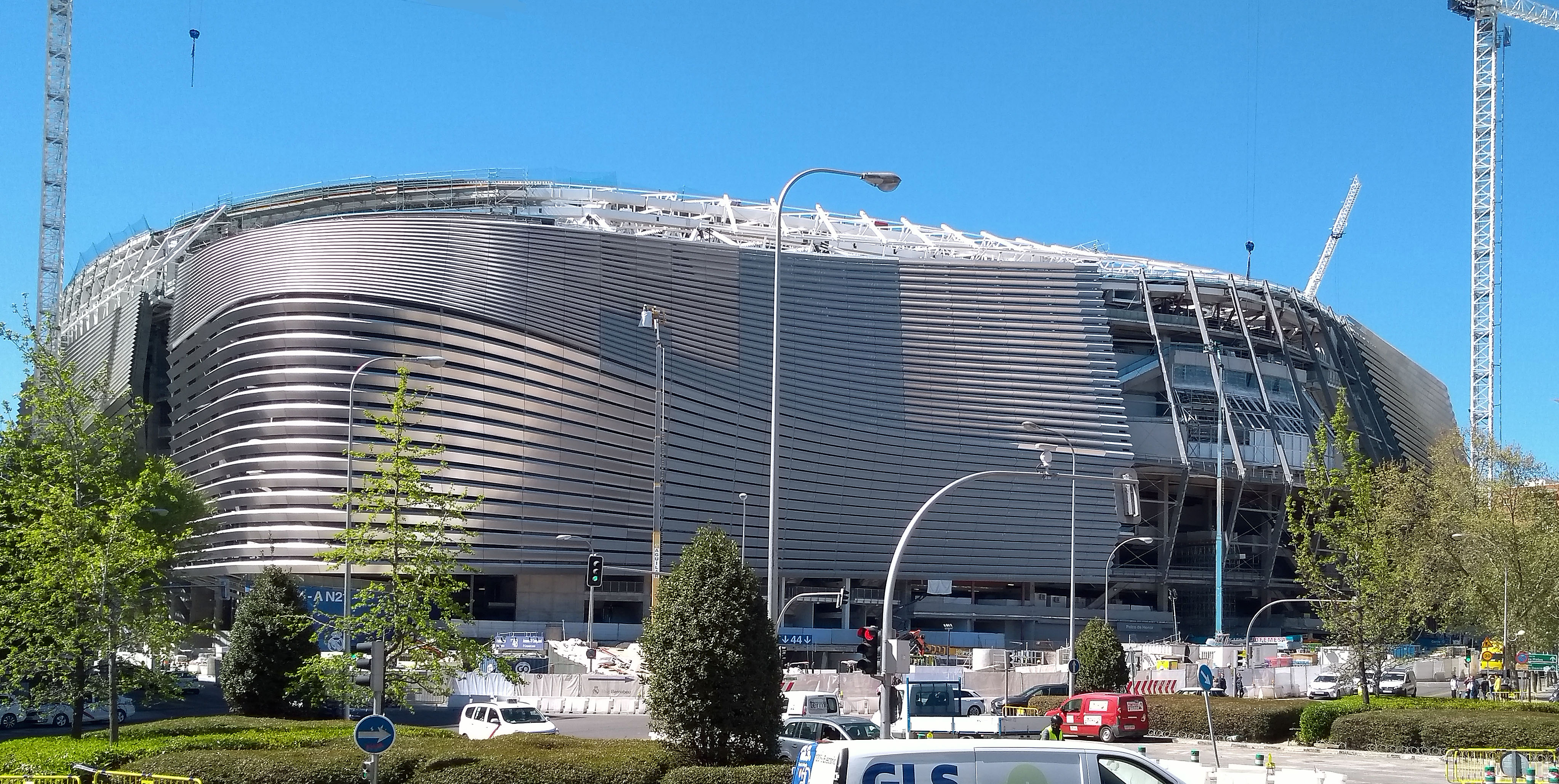
Construction of the East side facade (4 April 2023).

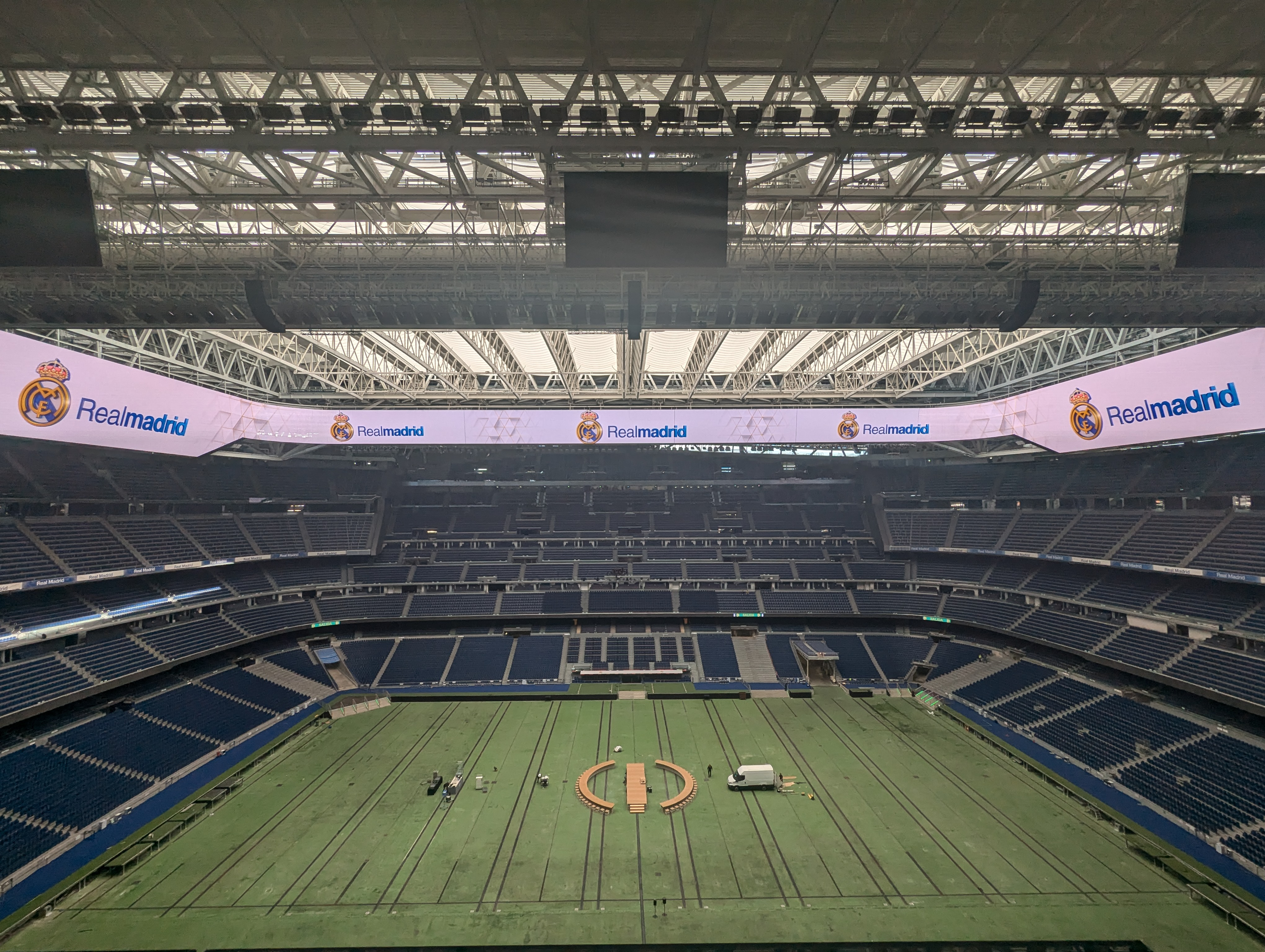
Interior and retractable roof in 2024.

The West facade of the stadium in 2026.

This proposal was announced at the Ordinary General Assembly on 12 September 2010, and approved by the delegate members at the Extraordinary Assembly on 25 September 2011. To implement it, the Madrid City Council and the Government of the Community of Madrid approved a specific amendment to the General Urban Development Plan in 2012, allowing the club to increase the buildability of the stadium and modify its facade. The proposed plan included a new architectural envelope, roof covering for all seats, and the incorporation of bioclimatic systems with renewable energy, as well as the construction of two new public plazas, a hotel, and a large shopping centre on the side facing Paseo de la Castellana.

To carry out this proposal, an International Architecture Competition was held in 2012 in which four teams of world-renowned prestige participated: one formed by the studios of Herzog & de Meuron and Rafael Moneo, another composed of Foster and Partners and Rafael de la Hoz, a third consisting of the teams of Populous and Estudio Lamela, and a fourth formed by GMP Architekten, L35, and Ribas & Ribas, whose proposal was announced as the winning project on 31 January 2014.

However, the project was halted in February 2015, when the Superior Court of Justice of Madrid annulled the approval of the specific amendment to the General Urban Development Plan of Madrid, considering it contrary to the general interest and urban planning regulations. The court argued that the plan entailed a substantial alteration of land use and an unjustified free grant of urban development rights to Real Madrid. Faced with this situation, the club decided to modify the winning project to comply with current laws and reduce its urban impact. Thus, in 2016, it presented a new project that eliminated the hotel and shopping center, raised the height of the stadium by only 12 meters (39 ft) for the construction of the roof, reaching a total height of 60 meters (200 ft), and eliminated the possibility of increasing the capacity.

Finally, on 31 May 2017, the Madrid City Council approved the renovation by approving the "Special Plan for the Santiago Bernabéu Stadium". After approving the replotting project, the sustainable mobility plan, and the urbanization project, the club awarded the renovation works to the construction company FCC Construcciones, which finally began in June 2019.

For the financing of the works, the Real Madrid board of directors approved a loan of 575 million euros on 12 April 2019, for 30 years with a fixed interest rate of 2.5%, including a 3-year grace period, resulting in an annual payment of 29.5 million euros starting from 30 July 2023. Additionally, on 7 December 2021, the financing was extended with an additional loan of 225 million euros for 27 years with a fixed interest rate of 1.53% and a grace period until 30 July 2024, with an annual payment of 10.5 million euros starting from that date. Finally, on 11 November 2023, a third loan of 370 million euros for 30 years was requested to cover cost overruns due to the COVID-19 pandemic and Russian invasion of Ukraine. Thus, the total financing amounts to 1.170 billion euros at an average interest rate of 3%, with an annual payment of 60 million euros over 30 years, which is less than half of the new expected annual profits after the completion of the works.

== Location ==
The stadium is located in the Chamartín district of Madrid. It occupies the block bounded by the Paseo de la Castellana and the streets of Concha Espina, Padre Damián, and Rafael Salgado.

=== Transportation ===
The stadium is served by its own metro station along the Line 10 called Santiago Bernabéu. It is also served by bus routes 14, 27, 40, 43, 120, 147 and 150.

== Major club matches ==
=== UEFA Champions League finals ===
Date	Winner	Score	Runner up	Attendance
30 May 1957	(Spain) Real Madrid	2–0	(Italy) Fiorentina	124,000
28 May 1969	(Italy) Milan	4–1	(Netherlands) Ajax	31,782
28 May 1980	(England) Nottingham Forest	1–0	(Germany) Hamburger SV	51,000
22 May 2010	(Italy) Inter Milan	2–0	(Germany) Bayern Munich	73,490

1957 European Cup final

This match on 30 May 1957 was contested between Real Madrid, champions of Spain, and Fiorentina, champions of Italy, at the former's home stadium. In this season, 16 teams played for the trophy. Real Madrid won 2–0 in the final after goals from Alfredo Di Stéfano and Francisco Gento in the second half. This was the second consecutive European Cup for Real Madrid after having won their first trophy one year before, at the Parc des Princes against Stade de Reims.

1969 European Cup final

On 28 May 1969, Milan, champions of Italy, played Ajax, champions of the Netherlands, to determine the champions of Europe. Milan defeated Ajax 4–1 to win their second European championship. Ajax made history by being the first Dutch team to reach a final.

1980 European Cup final

On 28 May 1980, defending champions Nottingham Forest of England, with Brian Clough as manager, faced Hamburger SV, champions of Germany. John Robertson's 20th-minute goal was the only goal of the match as Forest became the seventh club to at least repeat as European champions.

2010 UEFA Champions League final

On 22 May 2010, German champions Bayern Munich, who eliminated Lyon in the semi-finals, faced Italian champions Internazionale, who defeated defending champions Barcelona in the semi-finals. Both teams were seeking to become the first clubs from their respective countries to complete a treble, and Inter won 2–0 after two goals from Diego Milito.

=== Copa Libertadores ===
The two-legged 2018 CONMEBOL Copa Libertadores final pitted Argentine archrivals of Buenos Aires in Boca Juniors and River Plate against each other in the final for the first time. The first leg was held at Boca Juniors' home pitch, La Bombonera, on 11 November 2018, ending in a 2–2 draw with no away goal rule applied.

During the planned second leg on 24 November 2018 at El Monumental, the home stadium of River Plate, numerous River Plate fans threw glass bottles, bricks, dirts, stones, sands at the Boca Juniors team bus headed to the stadium, injuring numerous players as a result. CONMEBOL postponed and moved the second leg to Europe for 9 December 2018 on neutral ground at the Bernabéu for security and travel reasons.

Both sets of fans attended the match, and Darío Benedetto opened the scoring for Boca before Lucas Pratto equalised for River. With no further goals in normal time and no away goal rule, the match went to extra time. Wilmar Barrios was sent off for a second yellow card in the 92nd minute, and Juan Fernando Quintero then gave River the lead. Former Real Madrid midfielder Fernando Gago then went off injured, reducing Boca to 9 players having used all their substitutions, and Gonzalo Martínez raced the length of the pitch for a clincher into an empty net as Boca sent goalkeeper Esteban Andrada forward in search of an equaliser with time running out. River Plate won 3–1 (5–3 on aggregate) to lift the trophy outside of South America for the first time. The second leg of the final was also the first Superclásico to be played outside South America.

== Major international matches ==
=== Euro 1964 ===
The stadium hosted three matches during qualifying and the main tournament of 1964 European Nations' Cup. One qualifying match was played at the stadium as well as Spain's 2–1 semi-final victory against Hungary and the final in which Spain defeated the defending champions USSR 2–1.

1964 European Nations' Cup matches played at Santiago Bernabéu
Date	Team #1	Result	Team #2	Round	Attendance	Ref.
1 November 1962	Spain	6–0	Romania	Preliminary round first leg	51,608	
17 June 1964	Spain	2–1	Hungary	Semi-final	34,713	
21 June 1964	Spain	2–1	Soviet Union	Final	79,115	

=== 1982 FIFA World Cup ===
In the 1982 World Cup held in Spain, the stadium hosted four matches: three in the second round and the final in which Italy defeated West Germany 3–1.

1982 FIFA World Cup matches played at Santiago Bernabéu
Date	Team #1	Result	Team #2	Round	Attendance	Ref.
29 June 1982	West Germany	0–0	England	Second group stage	75,000	
2 July 1982	West Germany	2–1	Spain	Second group stage	90,089	
5 July 1982	Spain	0–0	England	Second group stage	75,000	
11 July 1982	Italy	3–1	West Germany	Final	90,000	

== Other uses ==
=== American football ===
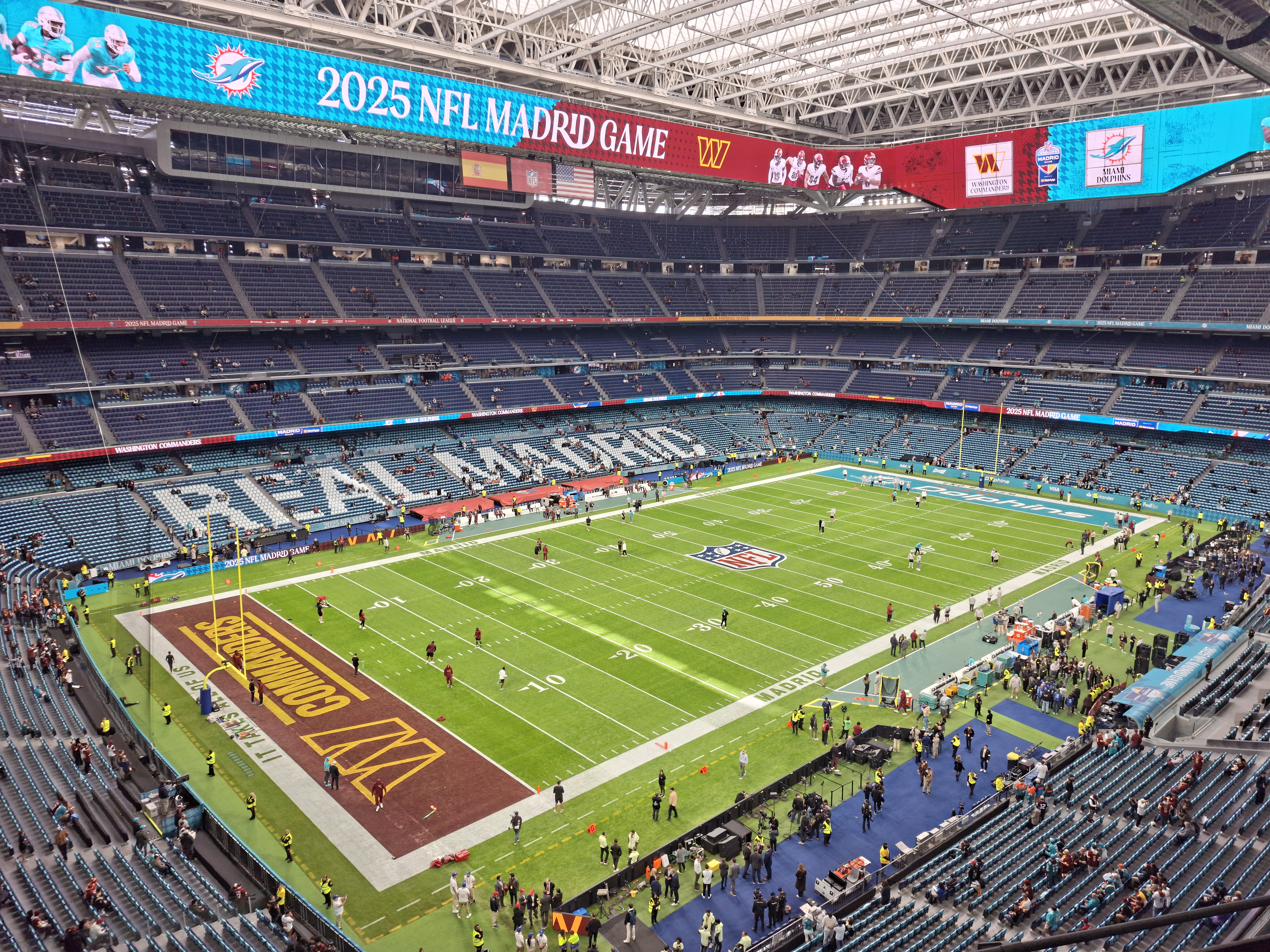
The Bernabéu during the Washington Commanders v Miami Dolphins game on 16 November 2025

The stadium hosted its first American football game on 16 November 1958, after a La Liga match between Real Madrid and Valencia; however, the teams were not professionals, but represented two United States Air Force bases in Europe: Tigers from Toul-Croix de Metz Airfield (France) and Tacooners from Giebelstadt Airport (Germany).

The stadium hosted its first National Football League game as part of the NFL International Series on 16 November 2025 with the Miami Dolphins defeating the Washington Commanders 16–13 in overtime.

Year	Date	Designated visitor	Score	Designated home team	Score	Attendance
2025	16 November	Washington Commanders	13	Miami Dolphins	16^{OT}	78,610
2026	8 November	Cincinnati Bengals	34	Atlanta Falcons	17	78,660

=== Rugby Union ===
==== 2035 Rugby World Cup Bid ====
In October 2026, the Spanish Rugby Federation put forward a proposal to host the 2035 Rugby World Cup with the stadium in line host major fixtures at the tournament, should the bid be successful.

=== Basketball ===
The stadium will host the opening match for EuroBasket 2029.

=== Cultural and social events ===
The stadium has played host to some significant political and religious events.

During his pastoral visit to Spain in 1982, Pope John Paul II addressed some 160,000 young individuals at the stadium.

In 2026, Pope Leo XIV will celebrate a Mass at the stadium.

=== Concerts ===
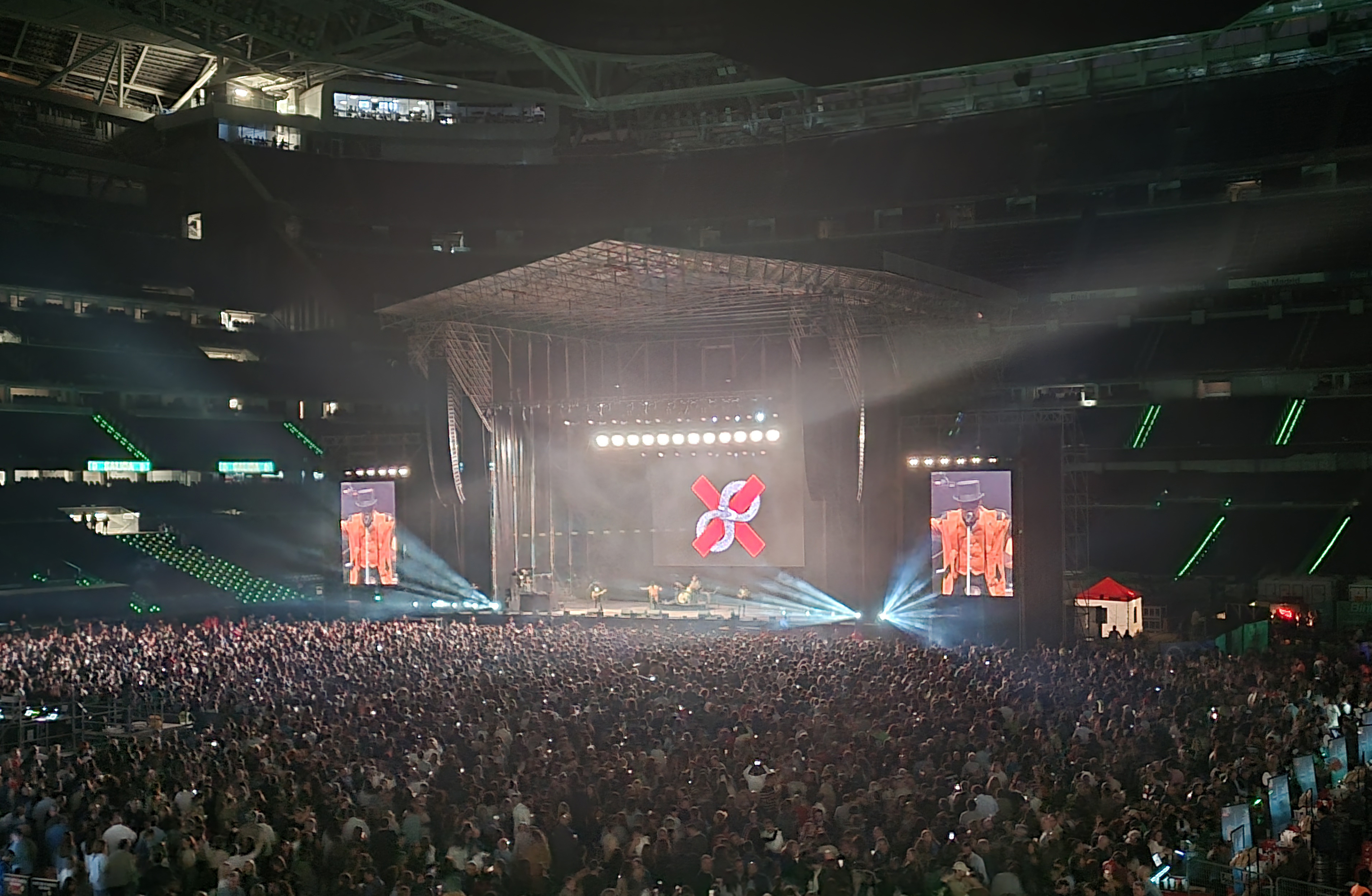
The Bernabéu hosting a concert on 26 April 2024

The stadium has hosted many touring musicians with dates in Madrid due to its expansive seating capacity and centralised location.

On 12 September 1983, Julio Iglesias (who played as a goalkeeper for Real Madrid Castilla in the late 1950s) performed for nearly 100,000 people at the stadium. On 21 September 1989, Iglesias gave a free concert to a crowd of 70,000 people at the stadium.

On 25 September 1986, Frank Sinatra performed at the stadium, his only concert in the Spanish capital.

On 15 July 1987, U2 held their first concert in Spain at the stadium as part of their Joshua Tree Tour, along with English bands Big Audio Dynamite, the Pretenders, and UB40 as the opening acts. Spanish journalist Javier Menéndez Flores believed that as many as 75,000 spectators may have been in attendance.

On 1 June 2002, the cast (16 contestants) of the reality singing competition show Operación Triunfo performed a sold-out concert at the stadium as part of a 27-city Spanish tour. The concert aired on La 1 to 5.14 million viewers, with a 39.5% share, becoming the most-watched concert in the country.

Bruce Springsteen and the E Street Band performed at the stadium on three separate tours, making him the first artist to perform at the stadium on more than one occasion. The first date was during the Magic Tour on 17 July 2008, where the band played to an audience of 53,783. Their second concert was part of the Wrecking Ball World Tour on 17 June 2012, with an audience of 54,639 people, the first time Springsteen and his band sold-out the stadium. Four years later, the band returned to the stadium on 21 May 2016 for The River Tour, performing to a sell-out crowd of 55,695.

The stadium was scheduled to host its first music festival on 30 June 2012, entitled El Gol de la Vida ("the goal of life"), a benefit concert featuring Dominican musician Juan Luis Guerra (as part of his A Son de Guerra World Tour), new flamenco singer Antonio Carmona, Mexican singer Marcela Gándara, and American Christian singer Marcos Witt. However, the event was postponed and moved to the indoor arena, Palacio de Deportes de la Comunidad de Madrid (the home of Real Madrid Baloncesto) for unknown reasons, possibly due to weather concerns, scheduling conflicts or capacity issues.

On 25 June 2014, the Rolling Stones became the third international artist (and rock band) to headline a show at the stadium, when they brought their 14 On Fire tour to a sell-out crowd of 57,416 spectators. Local rock icon Leiva opened for the English band.

On 29 June 2018, the top 16 finalists of the ninth series of Operación Triunfo performed at the stadium in front of 60,000 people, as part of their Spanish tour. It was the second time, the first being in 2002, that the contestants of Operación Triunfo brought their tour to the stadium.

Taylor Swift performed at the stadium on 29 and 30 May 2024 for her Eras Tour. Aside from being the first international artist to perform at the stadium in over a decade, Swift held the first concerts at the stadium following the completion of its renovation, which included updated technology to optimize the audience's experience at large-scale concerts, based on a comprehensive acoustic study. Reem Abdalazem of Diario AS also noted that the concert's announcement marked "the first major event announcement for the newly constructed stadium."

From 20–23 July 2024, Colombian singer Karol G performed four shows at the stadium for her Mañana Será Bonito World Tour, making her the artist with the most performances at the stadium. After announcing the first three shows from 20–22 June 2024, which sold-out in a matter of hours, the singer added a much-anticipated fourth show, marking the final dates of the European leg of her tour. Approximately 200,000 fans, at least, were estimated to be attending the four-night spectacle. The 2024 concerts at the stadium marked Karol G's first performances given in Spain in at least five years, since the earlier days of her career when she performed at small venues and festivals around the country.

Luis Miguel performed in July 2024.

=== Tennis ===
During the 2026 Mutua Madrid Open tennis tournament, the pitch at the Bernabéu was temporarily deactivated and, for the first time ever, converted into a clay tennis court, allowing the players that were participating at the tournament to train at the venue.

== See also ==
- Metropolitano Stadium, the home stadium of Real Madrid's inter-city rivals Atlético Madrid
- Lists of stadiums

Events and tenants
Preceded by Parc des Princes; Paris	European Cup; Final venue 1957	Succeeded by Heysel Stadium; Brussels
Preceded by Parc des Princes; Paris	European Nations' Cup; Final venue 1964	Succeeded by Stadio Olimpico; Rome
Preceded by Wembley Stadium; London	European Cup; Final venue 1969	Succeeded by San Siro; Milan
Preceded by Olympiastadion; Munich	European Cup; Final venue 1980	Succeeded by Parc des Princes; Paris
Preceded by Estadio Monumental Antonio Vespucio Liberti; Buenos Aires	FIFA World Cup; Final venue 1982	Succeeded by Estadio Azteca; Mexico City
Preceded by Stadio Olimpico; Rome	UEFA Champions League; Final venue 2010	Succeeded by Wembley Stadium; London
