= Cuatro Vientos (disambiguation) =

Cuatro Vientos is a barrio (district) of Madrid, Spain.

Cuatro Vientos may also refer to:

- Cuatro Vientos Airport, in Madrid
- Cuatro Vientos (Madrid Metro), a railway station in Madrid
- Cuatro Vientos (aircraft), an airplane that disappeared in 1933
