= Church of Santa María la Blanca (Alcorcón) =

Cultural property in Alcorcón, Spain

- Iglesia de Santa María la Blanca (Spanish)
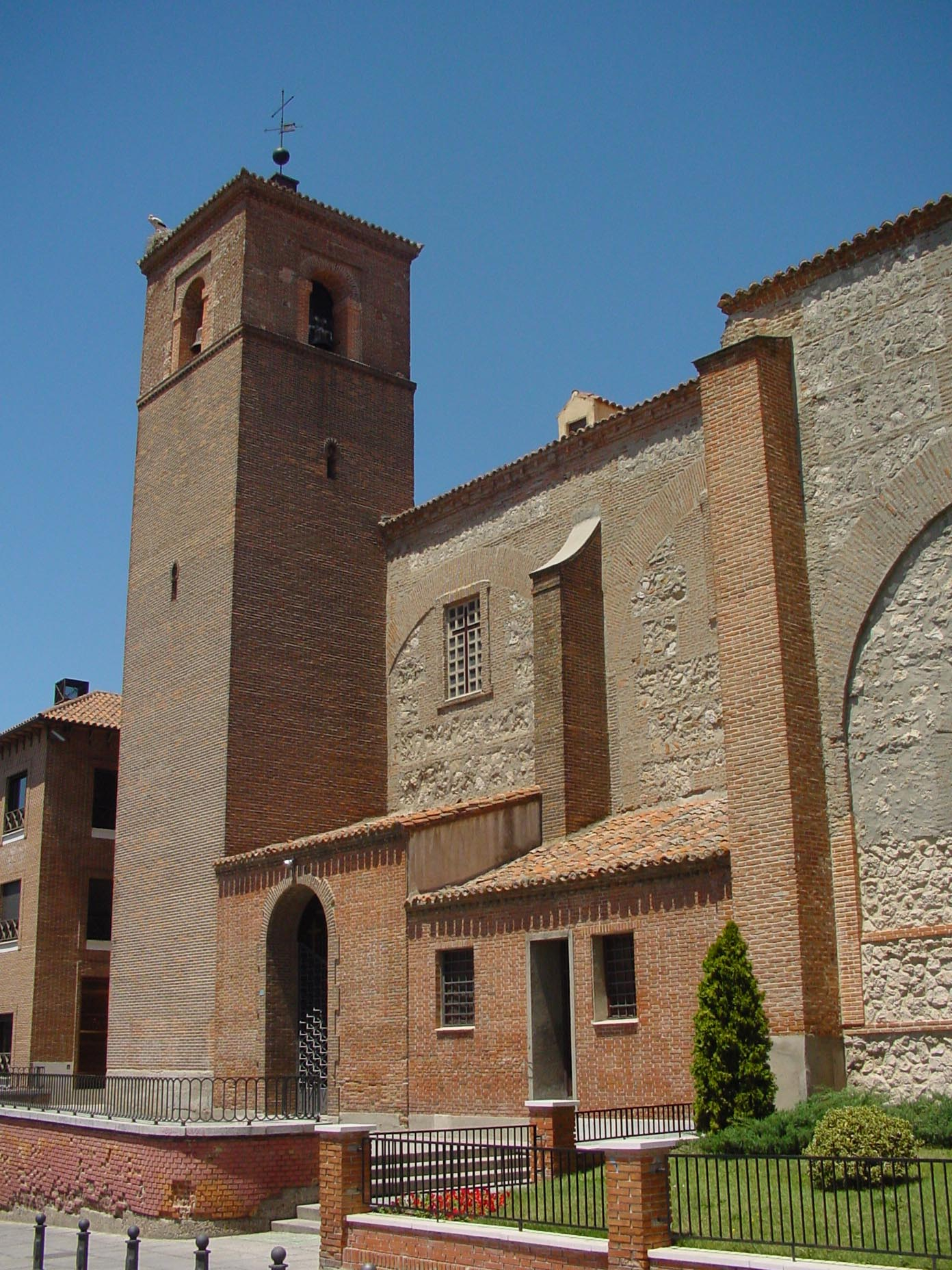

- Location within Spain
- 40.350077°N 3.828481°W
- Location: Alcorcón, Spain

Spanish Cultural Heritage
- Official name: Iglesia de Santa María la Blanca
- Type: Non-movable
- Criteria: Monument
- Designated: 1994
- Reference no.: RI-51-0008298

The Church of Santa María la Blanca (Spanish: Iglesia de Santa María la Blanca) is a church located in the historic centre of Alcorcón, Madrid metropolitan area, Spain.

== History ==
The toponym Alcorcón is of Arabic origin. It has been suggested that the church is on the site of a medieval mosque. However, no remains have been found from the Islamic period. The existing fabric of the building does not contain any features which can be dated to earlier than the sixteenth century.

== Conservation ==
The church is protected by a heritage listing. It was declared Bien de Interés Cultural in 1994.
