= La Granja (Madrid Metro) =

Madrid Metro station

- Platforms of the station

General information
- Location: Alcobendas, Madrid; Spain
- Coordinates: 40.5275987°N 3.6585919°W
- System: Madrid Metro station
- Owner: CRTM
- Operator: CRTM

Construction
- Accessible: yes

Other information
- Fare zone: B1

History
- Opened: 26 April 2007; 19 years ago

Services
Preceding station	Madrid Metro	Following station
La Moraleja towards Hospital Infanta Sofía	Line 10	Ronda de la Comunicación towards Puerta del Sur
Location
- Location within Community of Madrid

La Granja [la ˈɣɾaŋxa] is a station on Line 10 of the Madrid Metro, on the Calle de la Granja ("Farm Street"). It is located in fare Zone B1.
