= Line 10 (Madrid Metro) =

Rapid transit line of the Madrid Metro

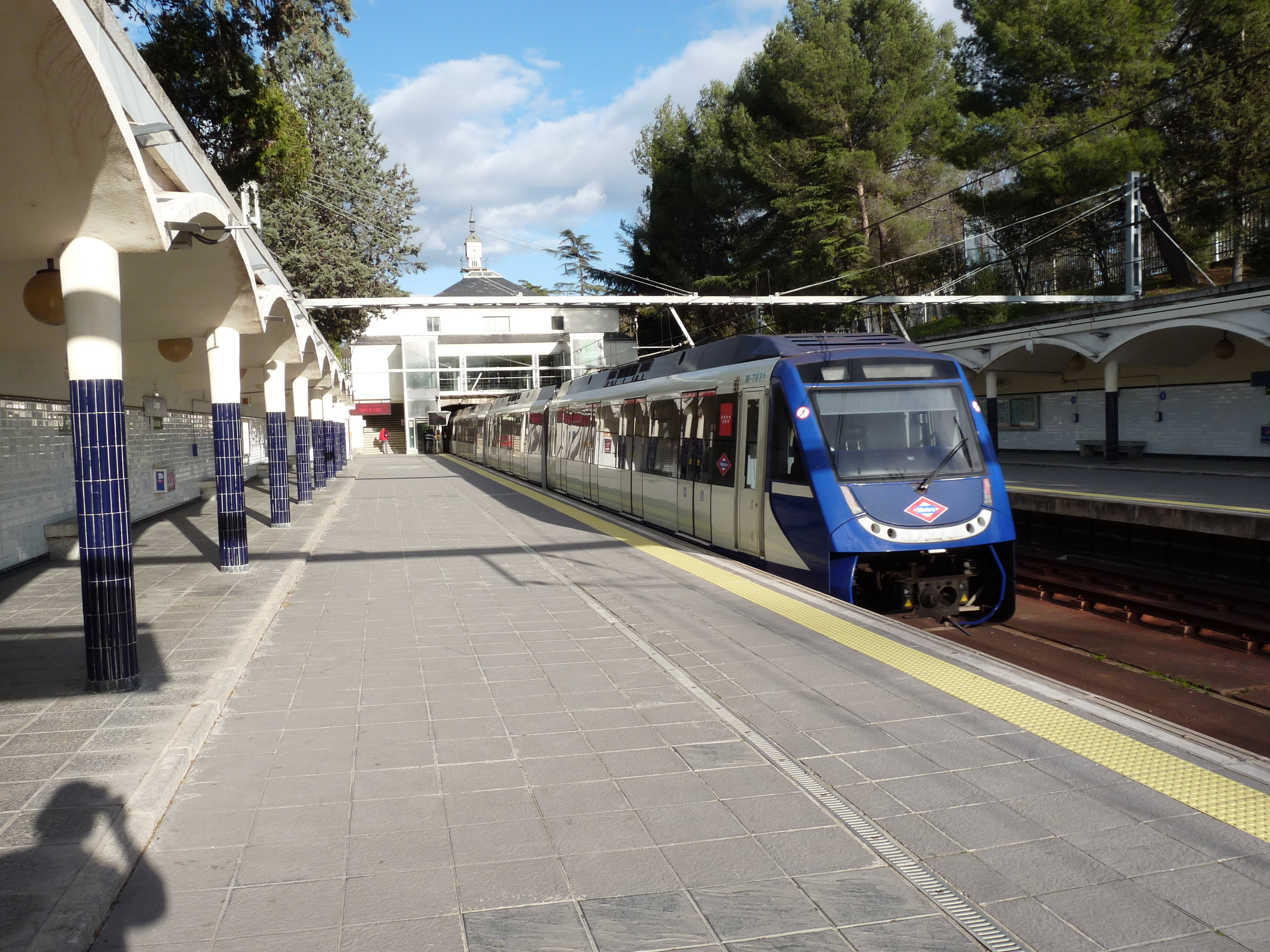
- A Class 7000 train at Lago station

Overview
- Native name: Línea 10
- Owner: CRTM
- Locale: Madrid
- Termini: Hospital Infanta Sofía; Puerta del Sur
- Stations: 31
- Website: www.metromadrid.es/en/linea/linea-10

Service
- Type: Rapid transit
- System: Madrid Metro
- Operator: CRTM
- Rolling stock: AnsaldoBreda 7000, 9000

History
- Opened: 1961; 65 years ago
- Last extension: 2007

Technical
- Line length: 36.514 km (22.689 mi)
- Character: Underground
- Track gauge: 1,445 mm (4 ft 8 7/8 in)

Line 10 route.

Line 10 of the Madrid Metro is a rapid transit line in Madrid, Spain that is actually the product of two formerly separate lines. Today the route begins at Hospital Infanta Sofía (San Sebastián de los Reyes) and ends at Puerta del Sur (Alcorcón). Passengers must transfer at Tres Olivos between the "line 10A" segment, which covers the portion of the route south of the station, and "line 10B", which extends north to Hospital Infanta Sofía.

Line 10 provides access to the Cuatro Torres Business Area at Begoña station, the AZCA at Nuevos Ministerios, as well as the Chamartín Railway station, Plaza de Castilla, Plaza de España, Principe Pío and Casa de Campo. The line links the towns of Alcobendas and San Sebastián de los Reyes with Madrid.

== History ==
=== Origins ===
The line is the product of two lines, the former Line 8 from Fuencarral to Nuevos Ministerios and the former Suburbano (also known as Line S) from Alonso Martínez to Aluche, this section being named line 10 in the 1980s, and formerly operated by FEVE until the management of Line S was transferred to the Community of Madrid. In the 1990s, Madrid planned for these two lines to become one, but there was a problem in that Line 8 used wider train sets than Line S. As a remedy, Madrid decided to rebuild the Suburbano section to fit the large-profile rolling stock, a project that took five years to complete. This project removed all island platforms, widened tunnels, and modernized stations. The section between Alonso Martinez and Nuevos Ministerios was completely built, with an intermediate station at Gregorio Marañón. While this project was in progress the line was extended from the new Casa de Campo station to Colonia Jardín. The former section between Casa de Campo and Aluche was transferred to Line 5, which now terminates at Casa de Campo.

=== Southern extension ===
On 11 April 2003, Line 10 was extended to Puerta del Sur where it meets Line 12 (also known as Metro-Sur). The last two stations on this extension are in fact outside Madrid and in the town of Alcorcón. Joaquín Vilumbrales is also unique to this line and it is one of the few stations to have an island platform instead of side platforms. On 22 December 2006, Aviación Española was opened as an infill station between Colonia Jardín and Cuatro Vientos. This station was opened to serve the nearby Aircraft Museum and is named after it. On 26 April 2007, the line was extended north from Fuencarral to Hospital del Norte (Hospital Infanta Sofía as of August 2008).

The station after Fuencarral, Tres Olivos is a transfer station between the regular line ("line 10A") and the northern extension or otherwise known as MetroNorte ("line 10B"), which is the segment from Tres Olivos to Hospital Infanta Sofía.

== Future ==
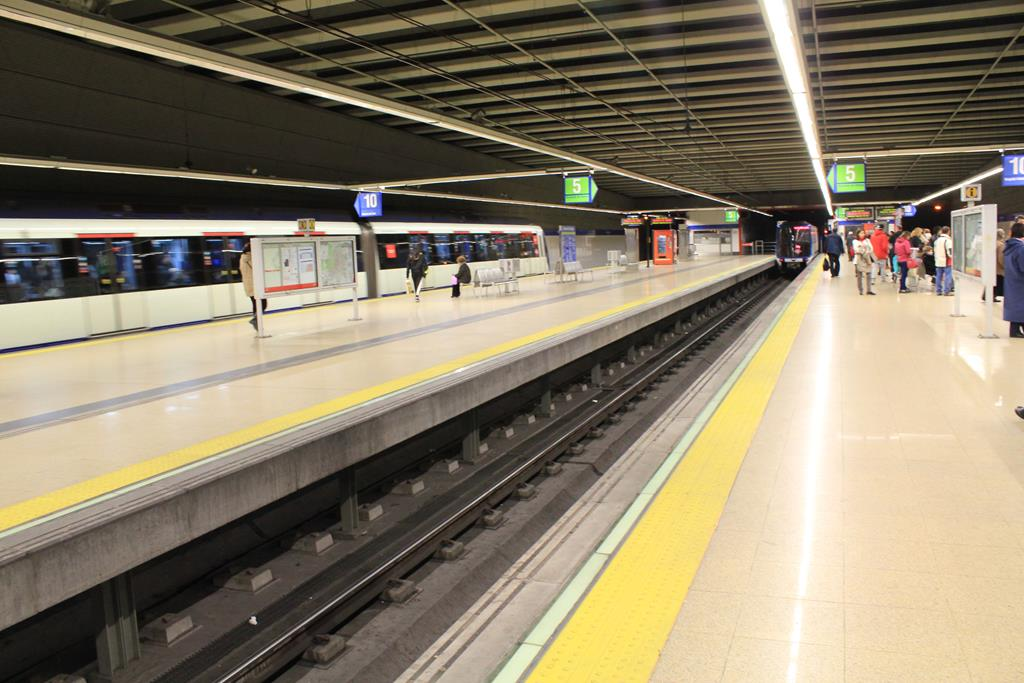
The interchange station at Casa de Campo, where Line 5 terminates.

Proposed plans for Line 10 include the building of a new station between Colonia Jardín and Aviación Española called Dario Gazapo. Also there are plans to extend the line from Puerta del Sur to Mostoles Central and further onto the new Xanadu Shopping Centre. However, this is unlikely because Metro Sur already reaches Mostoles from Puerta Del Sur, but via Alcorcón.

== Stations ==
Stations marked with a yellow background remain closed due to works.

Municipality	District	Station	Opened	Zone	Connections
San Sebastián de los Reyes		Hospital Infanta Sofía	2007	B1	
San Sebastián de los Reyes		Reyes Católicos	2007	B1	
San Sebastián de los Reyes		Baunatal	2007	B1	
Alcobendas		Manuel de Falla	2007	B1	
Alcobendas		Marqués de la Valdavia	2007	B1	
Alcobendas		La Moraleja	2007	B1	
Alcobendas		La Granja	2007	B1	
Madrid	Fuencarral-El Pardo	Ronda de la Comunicación	2007	A	
Madrid	Fuencarral-El Pardo	Las Tablas	2007	A	Metro Ligero:
Madrid	Fuencarral-El Pardo	Montecarmelo	2007	A	
Madrid	Fuencarral-El Pardo	Tres Olivos	2007	A	
Madrid	Fuencarral-El Pardo	Fuencarral	1982	A	
Madrid	Fuencarral-El Pardo / Chamartín	Begoña	1982	A	
Madrid	Chamartín	Chamartín	1967	A	Cercanías Madrid: Renfe Media Distancia: 51, 53, 54, 55, 57, 58, 86; Renfe Operadora: AVE, Avlo, Alvia; Ouigo España
Madrid	Chamartín / Tetuán	Plaza de Castilla	1961	A	Madrid Metro:
Madrid	Chamartín / Tetuán	Cuzco	1982	A	
Section closed
Madrid	Chamartín / Tetuán	Santiago Bernabéu	1982	A	
Section closed
Madrid	Chamartín / Tetuán / Chamberí	Nuevos Ministerios	1979	A	Madrid Metro: Cercanías Madrid: Renfe Media Distancia: 53
Madrid	Chamartín / Chamberí	Gregorio Marañón	1998	A	Madrid Metro:
Madrid	Chamberí / Centro	Alonso Martínez	1944	A	Madrid Metro:
Madrid	Centro	Tribunal	1919	A	Madrid Metro:
Madrid	Centro / Moncloa-Aravaca	Plaza de España	1925	A	Madrid Metro:
Madrid	Moncloa-Aravaca	Príncipe Pío	1925	A	Madrid Metro: Cercanías Madrid: Renfe Media Distancia: 13, 16
Madrid	Moncloa-Aravaca	Lago	1961	A	
Madrid	Moncloa-Aravaca / Latina	Batán	1961	A	
Madrid	Moncloa-Aravaca / Latina	Casa de Campo	2002	A	Madrid Metro:
Madrid	Latina	Colonia Jardín	2002	A	Metro Ligero:
Madrid	Latina	Aviación Española	2006	A	
Madrid	Latina	Cuatro Vientos	2003	A	Cercanías Madrid:
Alcorcón		Joaquín Vilumbrales	2003	B1	
Alcorcón		Puerta del Sur	2003	B1	Madrid Metro:

== Rolling stock ==
Line 10A uses 6-car trains of class 7000, and line 10B uses 3 car trains of class 9000.

Some Line 10 units are sometimes used for Line 7 service.

== See also ==
- Madrid
- Transport in Madrid
- List of Madrid Metro stations
- List of metro systems
