= Parque de La Granja =

Park in the Canary Islands

Coordinates: 28.4632°N 16.2655°W

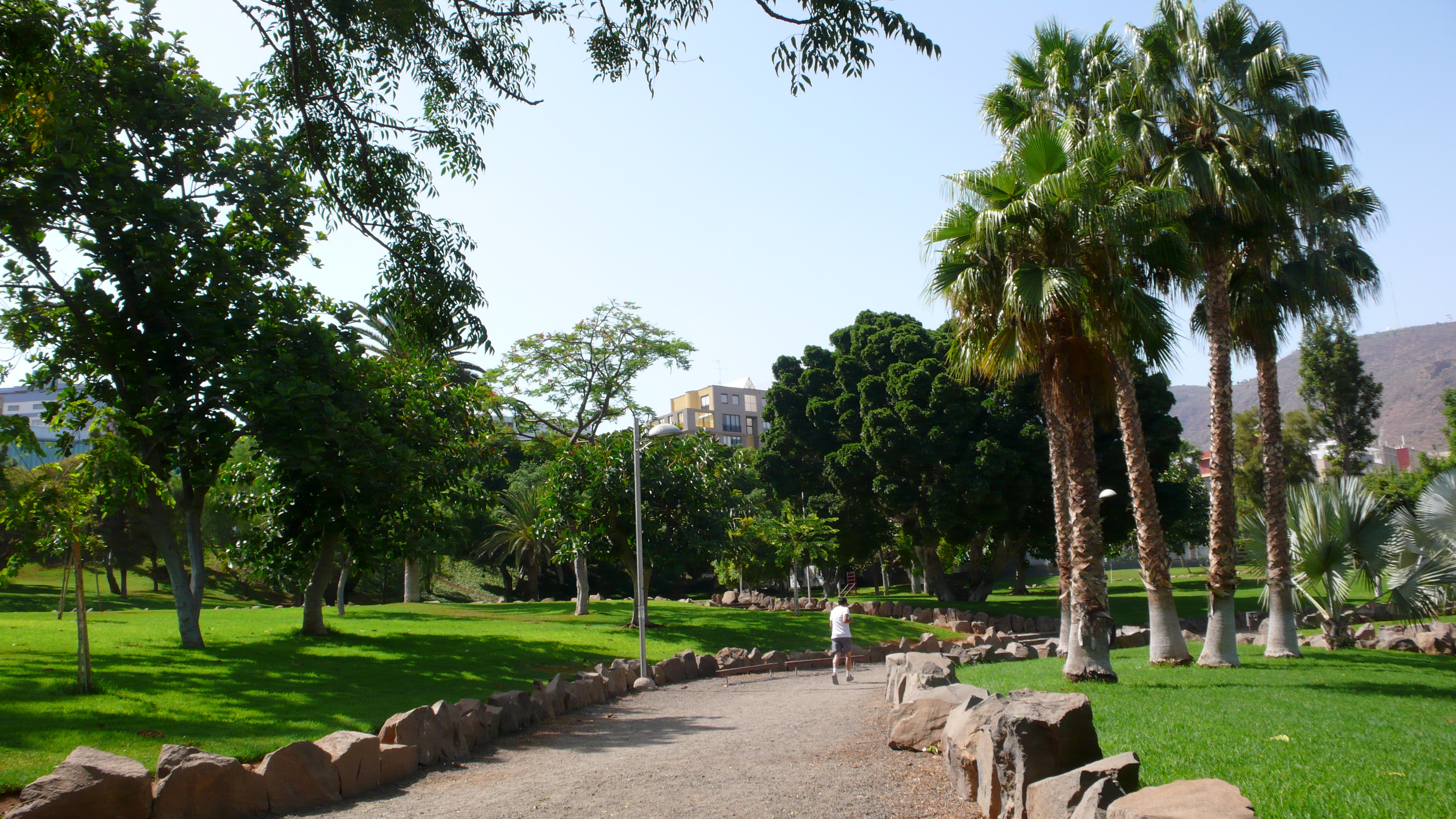
Parque de La Granja

The Parque de La Granja is a park in Santa Cruz de Tenerife, Canary Islands, Spain. It was built between 1969 and 1976. It is a wide area designated for sports, games, rides to admire the flora and more. It is one of the largest urban parks in the Canary Islands.

The Parque de La Granja has a very broad extension of facilities for outdoor sports. It has wide roads of asphalt and gravel, surrounded by garden plots.

Many Santa Cruz residents associate sports with this park, which can be accessed from Avenida de Madrid or Avenida Benito Pérez Armas. The Parque de la Granja, built in 1969, is somewhat larger than the García Sanabria Park and inside there are groups of royal palms and reed beds, large areas of grass, a children's playground and several sculptures, one of them erected by Belén Morales in homage to Félix Rodríguez de la Fuente.
