= Alcorcón =

- Municipality
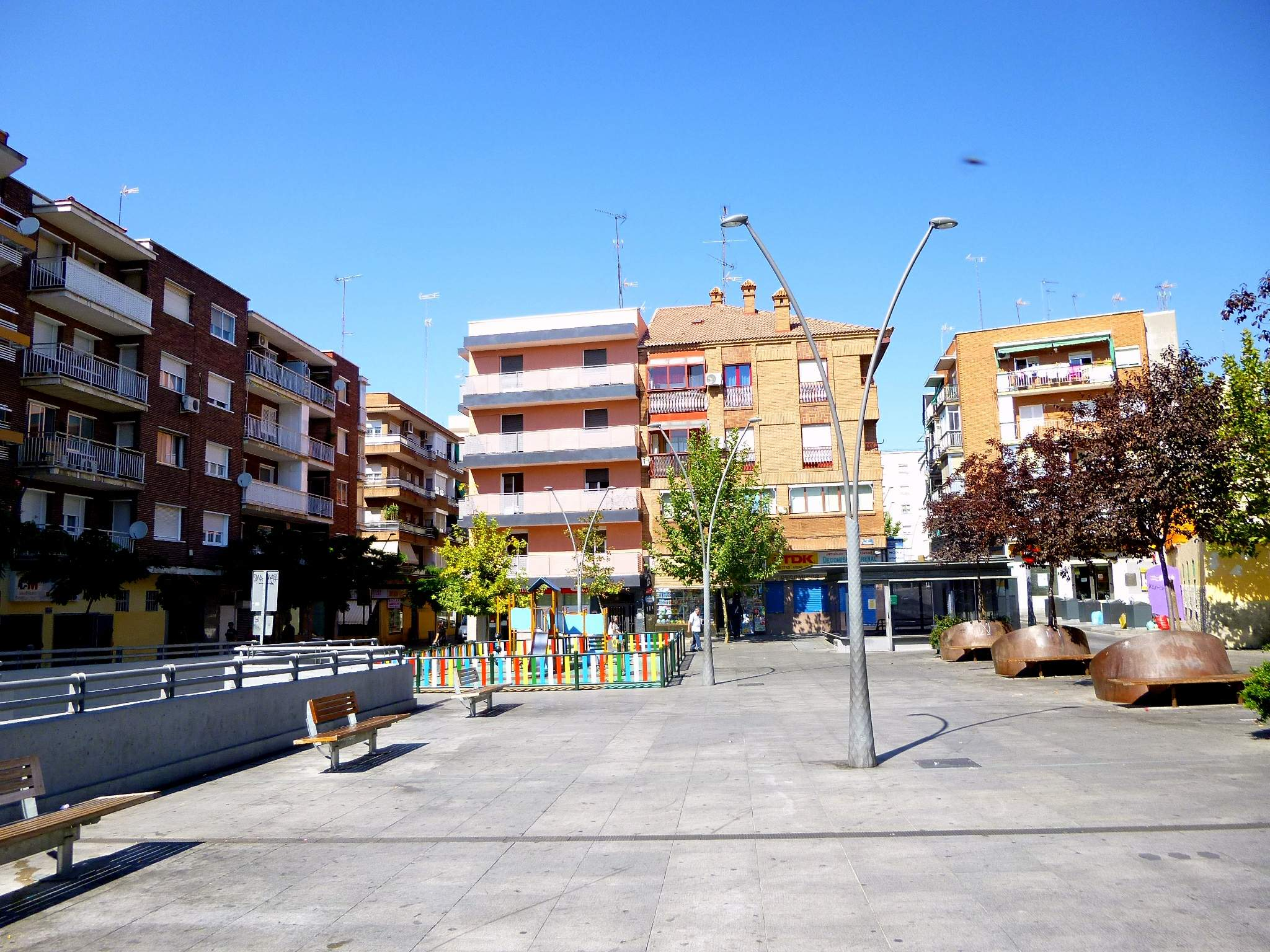

- Flag Coat of arms
- Interactive map of Alcorcón
- Coordinates: 40°21′0″N 3°50′0″W
- Country: Spain
- Region: Community of Madrid

Government
  - Type: Ayuntamiento
  - Body: Ayuntamiento de Alcorcón
  - Mayor: Candelaria Testa (PSOE)

Area
  - Total: 33.7 km^{2} (13.0 sq mi)
- Elevation: 711 m (2,333 ft)

Population (2025-01-01)
  - Total: 175,719
  - Density: 5,210/km^{2} (13,500/sq mi)
- Demonyms: Alcorconero, -ra
- Time zone: UTC+1 (CET)
  - Summer (DST): UTC+2 (CEST)
- Postal code: 28921–28925
- Area code: +34 (ES) + 91 (M)
- Website: Official website

Alcorcón (Spanish: [alkoɾˈkon]) is a city and municipality of Spain located in the Community of Madrid. As of 2022, it had a population of 170,296.

== Geography ==
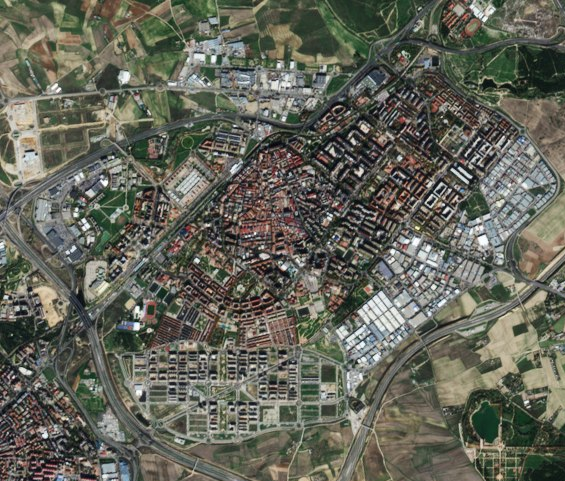
The city as seen by the European Space Agency's Sentinel-2.

The municipality, largely flat, lies at an average altitude of 711 metres above sea level, with the highest point being El Ventorro del Cano (741 m), located in the north of the municipality.

== History ==
The site appears to have been inhabited since prehistoric times. The name is of Arabic origin, but little is known of Alcorcón before the medieval Christian conquest. The first recorded written reference to Alcorcón is in a court document (privilegio rodado) dated on 28 July 1208, in the context of the territorial strife over El Real de Manzanares between the city councils of Madrid and Segovia that took place in the Middle Ages. The parish church, Santa María la Blanca dates back to the 16th and 17th centuries. Alcorcón preserved an urban structure characteristic of a small rural settlement until the 1960s. The centre is surrounded by modern developments, as Alcorcón has grown rapidly since that decade.

As announced in February 2013, Alcorcón was the tentative building site for the Eurovegas casino resort project, but the proposed development was canceled in December 2013.

== Economy ==
Agriculture and animal husbandry are hardly performed, and only a 0.04% of the GDP of the municipality is collected from these activities. Mining, industry and power economy activities produce the 11.09% of the money collected of this economy measure. 8.17% of the registers to an organism of the Welfare System named Tesorería General de la Seguridad Social (in which people must be registered when being hired), were linked to the organism by jobs of this sector. Construction activities make 7.28% of the GDP, and 10.65% of the registers in Tesorería General de la Seguridad Social are due to posts in the sector. 10.57% of the inhabitants work in the trade and hotel industry sectors, and 12.37% have transportation and stock posts.

== Transport ==
Alcorcón is linked to Madrid by Metro Line 10, Line 12, and Line 3 (Metro Ligero), Cercanías line C-5 and several buses (511, 512, 513, 514, 516, 518, 536, 541, 545, 546, 547, 548, 551, N501, N502, N504).

== Main sights ==
Some sights that have special historical, artistic or cultural values are listed below:

- San José de Valderas Castles: They have a Gothic Revival architectural style.
- Santa María la Blanca Parish Church
- Glass art museum

== Sport ==
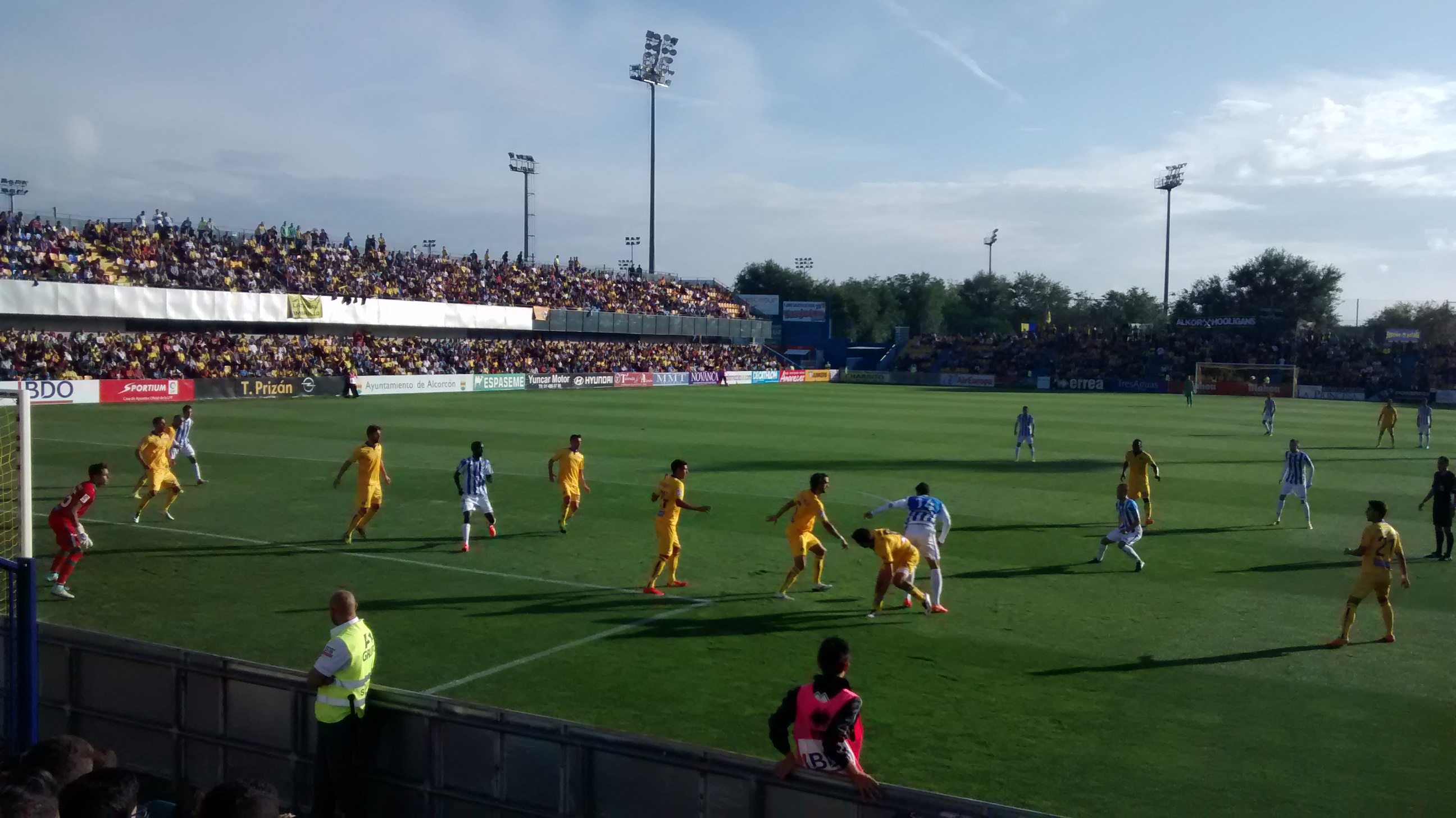
An Alcorcón vs Leganés fixture played at Santo Domingo Municipal Stadium.

The city is home to the football team Agrupación Deportiva de Alcorcón that played in Primera Federación in the 2025/26 season and Trival Valderas that played in Tercera Federación in 2025/26. Alcorcón also has an American football team called Alcorcón Smilodons, whose colors are yellow and navy blue.

== Health ==
Alcorcón has two hospitals, the Fundación Hospital de Alcorcón (which is state owned, but run privately), and the Hospital Sur Madrid (a totally private hospital). The Alcorcón campus of the Universidad Rey Juan Carlos (URJC) teaches health-related courses.

== City partnerships ==
- Mayarí (Cuba)
- Nejapa (El Salvador)
- Ancón (Peru)
- Al Hoceima (Morocco)
- Daira of Bu Craa (in the Sahrawi refugee camps near Tinduf, Algeria)
- Salfit (Palestine)

== People ==
- La Terremoto de Alcorcón, singer

== See also ==
- Ensanche Sur
