= Puerta del Sur (Madrid Metro) =

Madrid Metro station

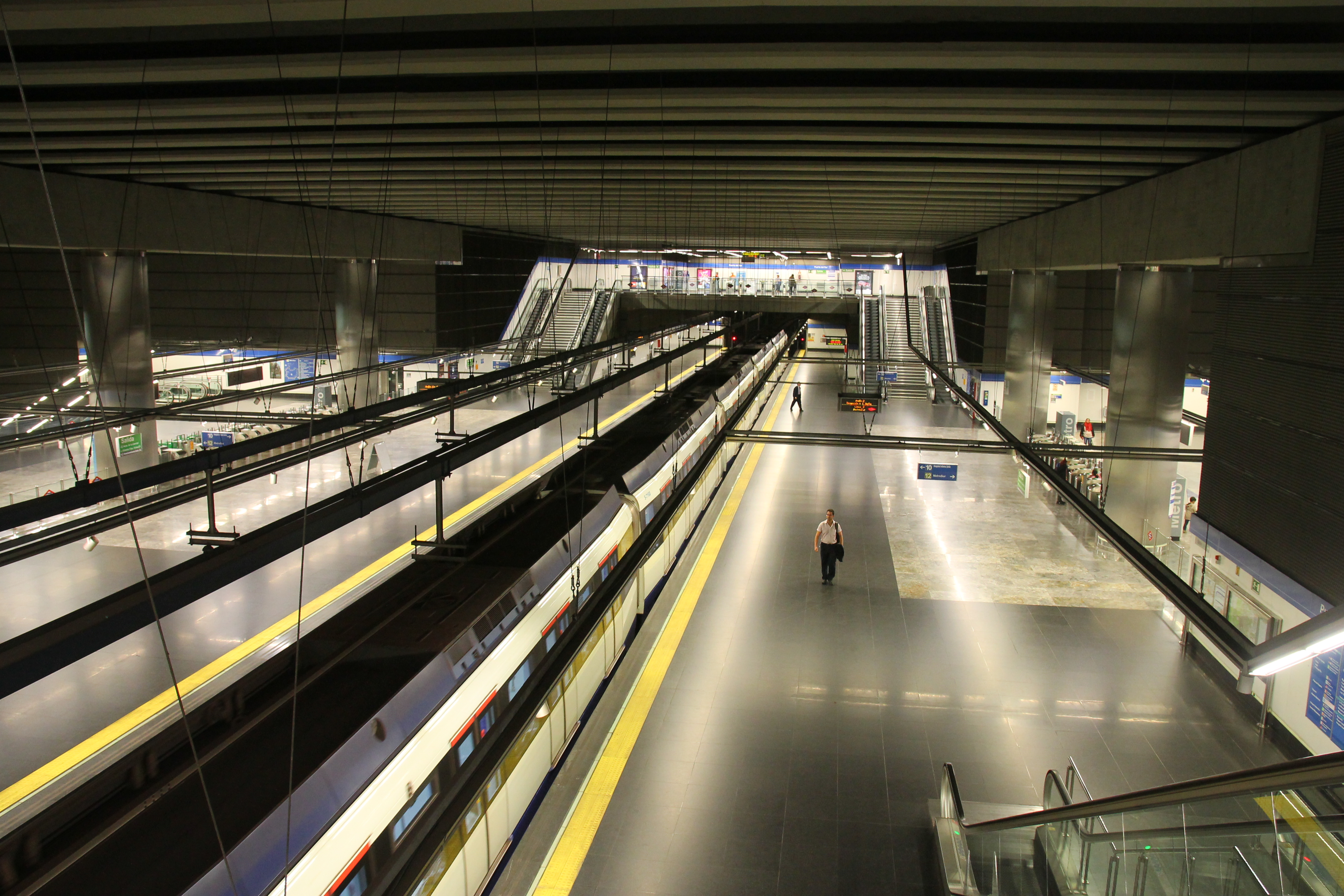

General information
- Location: Alcorcón, Madrid; Spain
- Coordinates: 40.3452443°N 3.8121102°W
- System: Madrid Metro station
- Owner: CRTM
- Operator: CRTM

Construction
- Accessible: yes

Other information
- Fare zone: B1

History
- Opened: 11 April 2003; 23 years ago

Services
Preceding station	Madrid Metro	Following station
Joaquín Vilumbrales towards Hospital Infanta Sofía	Line 10	Terminus
San Nicasio clockwise / outer	Line 12	Parque Lisboa anticlockwise / inner
Location
- Location within Madrid

Puerta del Sur ([ˈpweɾta ðel ˈsuɾ], "Gate of the South") is a station on Line 10 and Line 12 of the Madrid Metro. It is located in fare Zone B1. As entering Puerta del Sur is considered to be synonymous with entering Metrosur (Line 12), all passengers who leave Puerta del Sur station must have valid tickets for fare Zone B1, which includes parts of Line 12.
