= Hospital Infanta Sofía (Madrid Metro) =

Madrid Metro station

- Platforms of the station

General information
- Location: San Sebastián de los Reyes, Madrid; Spain
- Coordinates: 40.5597668°N 3.6114579°W
- System: Madrid Metro station
- Owner: CRTM
- Operator: CRTM

Construction
- Accessible: yes

Other information
- Fare zone: B1

History
- Opened: 26 April 2007; 19 years ago

Services
Preceding station	Madrid Metro	Following station
Terminus	Line 10	Reyes Católicos towards Puerta del Sur
Location
- Location within Community of Madrid

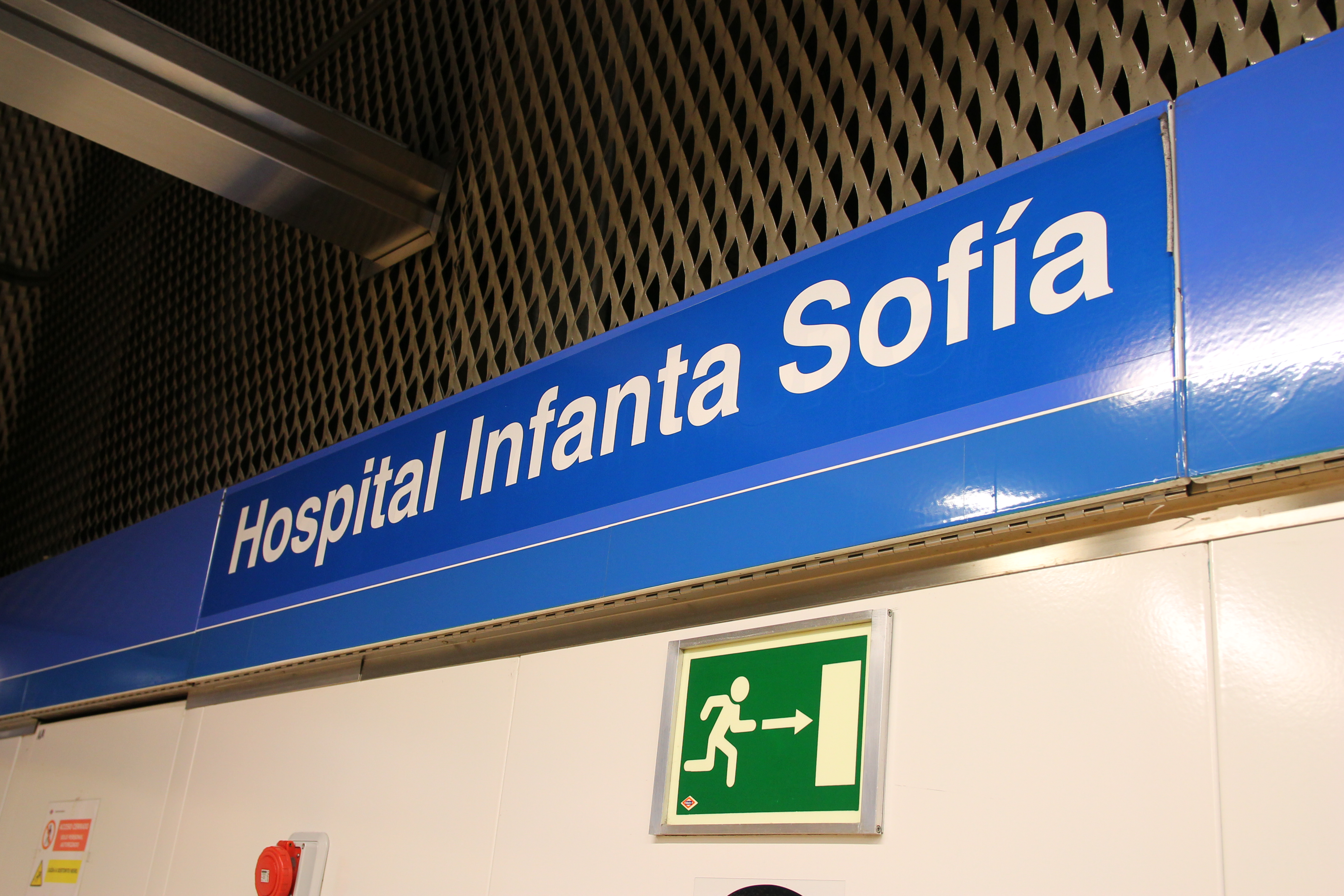
Station Sign

Hospital Infanta Sofía (Spanish pronunciation: [ospiˈtal iɱˈfanta soˈfi.a]) is the northern terminus of Line 10 of the Madrid Metro, serving the Hospital Universitario Infanta Sofía ("Princess Sofía University Hospital"). It is located in fare Zone B1.
