= Nuevo Mundo (Madrid Metro) =

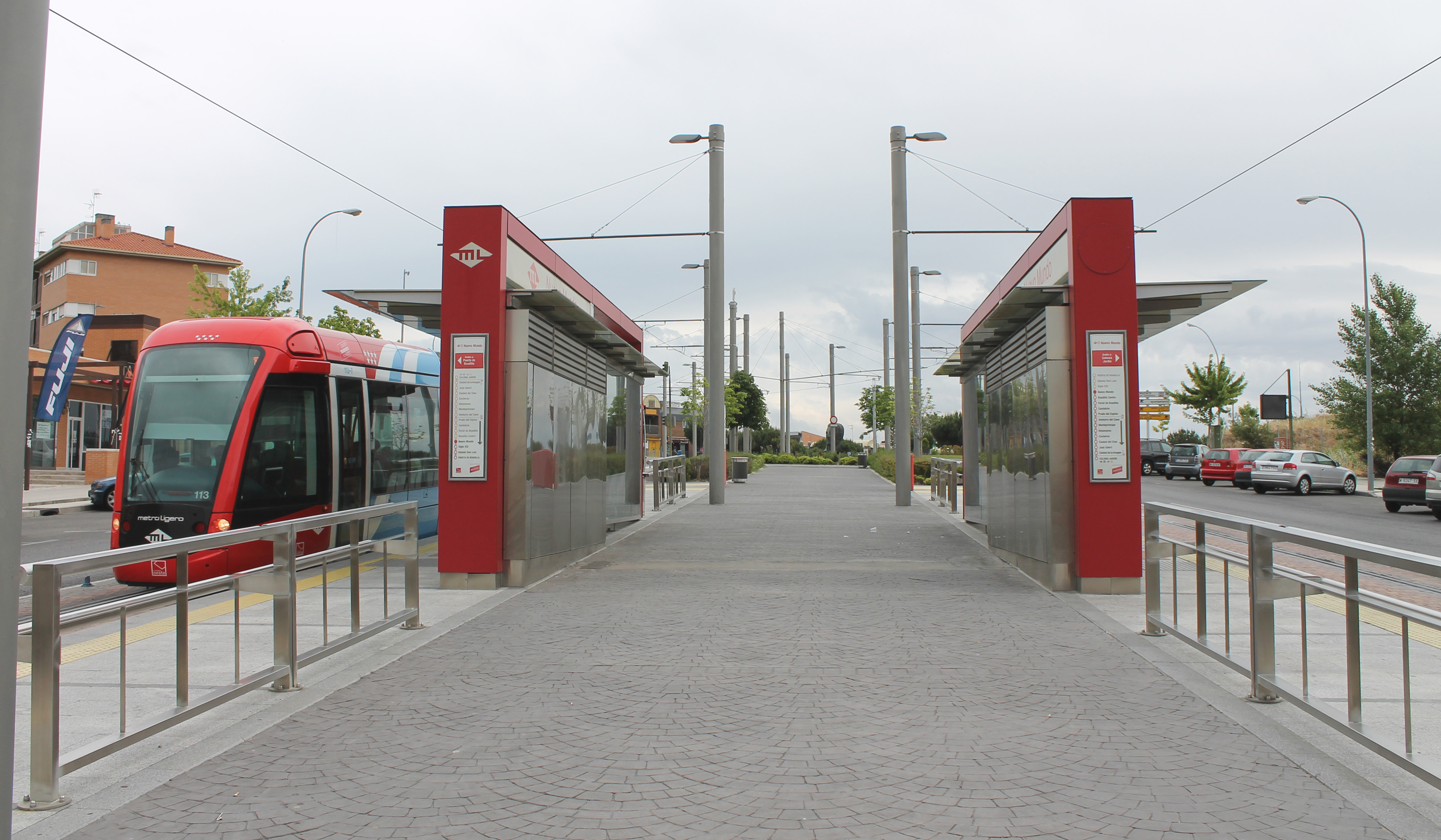

General information
- Location: Boadilla del Monte, Madrid; Spain
- Coordinates: 40.4056417°N 3.8857593°W
- System: Madrid Metro station
- Owner: CRTM
- Operator: Metro Oeste

Other information
- Fare zone: B2

History
- Opened: 27 July 2007; 19 years ago

Services
Preceding station	Madrid Metro	Following station
Boadilla Centro towards Colonia Jardín	Line ML-3	Siglo XXI towards Puerta de Boadilla
Location
- Location within Community of Madrid

Nuevo Mundo [ˈnweβo ˈmundo] is a station on Line 3 of the Metro Ligero. It is located in fare Zone B2.
