= Boadilla Centro (Madrid Metro) =

Spain station

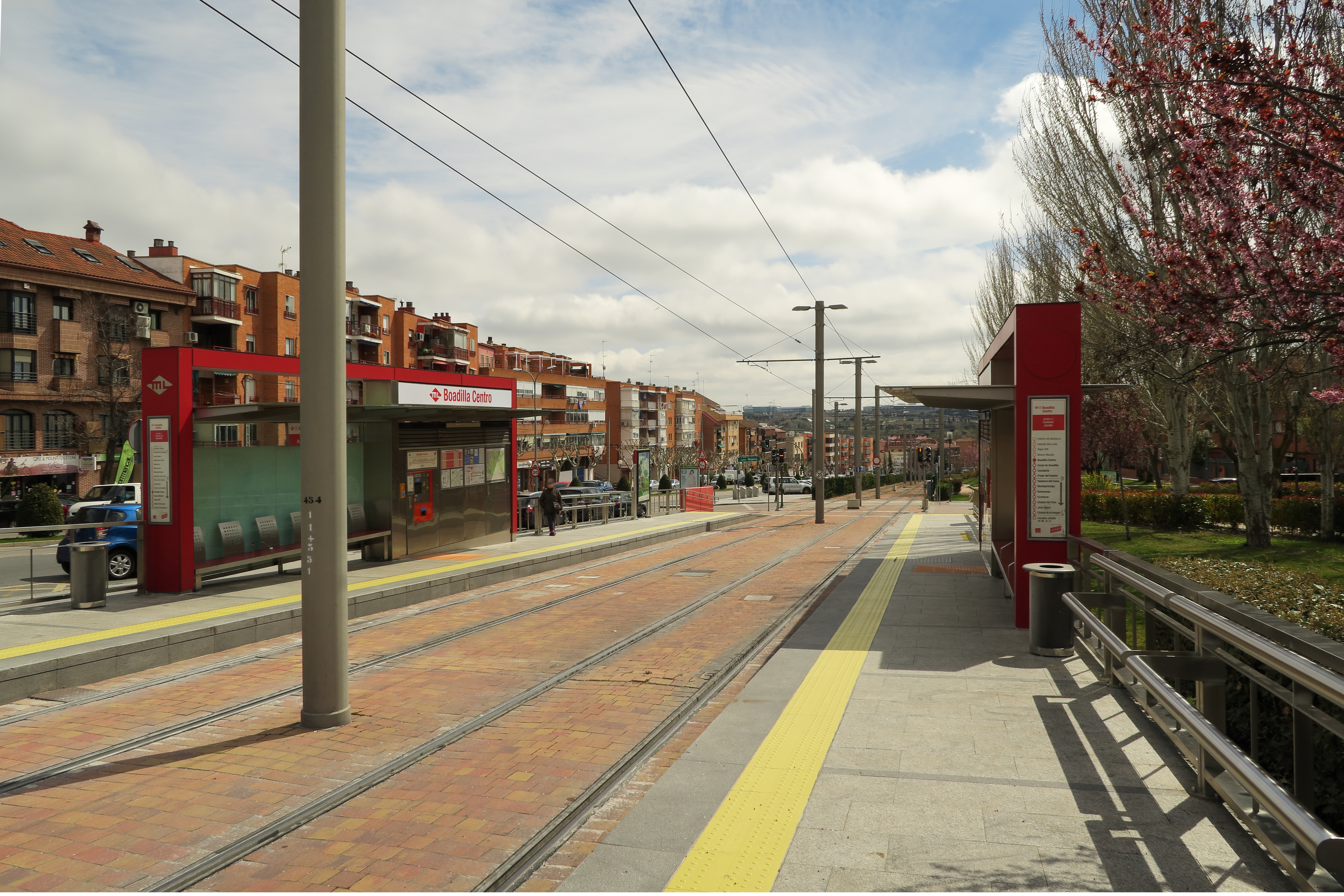

General information
- Location: Boadilla del Monte, Madrid; Spain
- Coordinates: 40.407161°N 3.8800414°W
- System: Madrid Metro station
- Owner: CRTM
- Operator: Metro Oeste

Other information
- Fare zone: B2

History
- Opened: 27 July 2007; 19 years ago

Services
Preceding station	Madrid Metro	Following station
Ferial del Boadilla towards Colonia Jardín	Line ML-3	Nuevo Mundo towards Puerta de Boadilla
Location
- Location within Community of Madrid

Boadilla Centro [boaˈðiʝa ˈθentɾo] is a station on Line 3 of the Metro Ligero in Madrid, Spain. It is located in fare Zone B2.
