= José Isbert (Madrid Metro) =

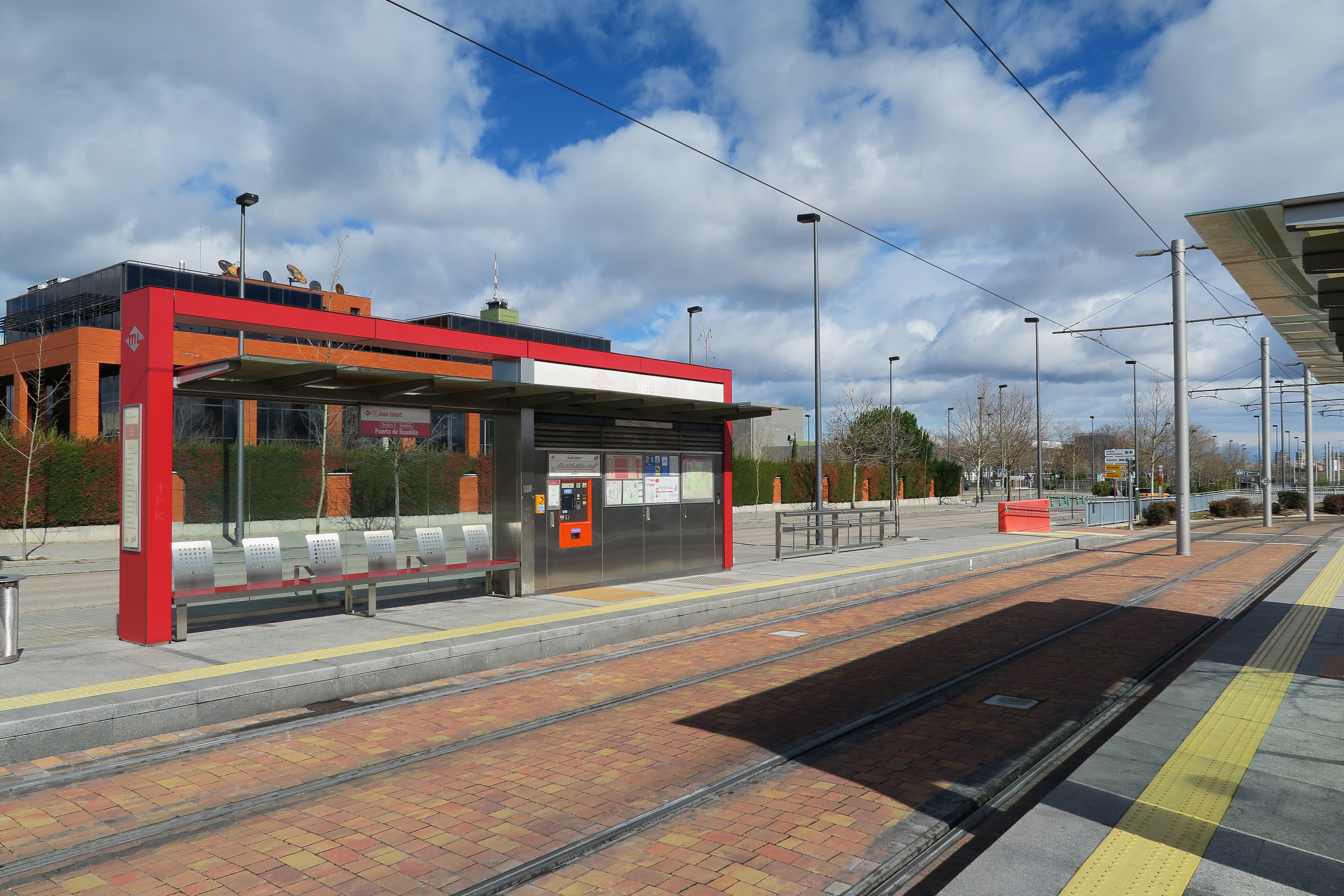

General information
- Location: Pozuelo de Alarcón, Madrid; Spain
- Coordinates: 40.3952543°N 3.7899332°W
- System: Madrid Metro station
- Owner: CRTM
- Operator: Metro Oeste

Other information
- Fare zone: B1

History
- Opened: 27 July 2007; 19 years ago

Services
Preceding station	Madrid Metro	Following station
Ciudad de la Imagen towards Colonia Jardín	Line ML-3	Ciudad del Cine towards Puerta de Boadilla
Location
- Location within Madrid

José Isbert [xoˈse jsˈβeɾt] is a station on Line 3 of the Metro Ligero. It is located in fare Zone B1.
