= Cantabria (disambiguation) =

Cantabria may refer to:

- Cantabria, a Spanish historical region and autonomous community
- Former territory of Cantabri people
- Duchy of Cantabria, a march created by the Visigoths in northern Iberian Peninsula between the 7th and 9th centuries
- Present-day Basque Autonomous Community, or sometimes the whole Basque region, during the Modern Age
- Cantabria (Spanish Congress Electoral District)
- SS Cantabria (1919), a Spanish cargo ship sunk in the Spanish Civil War
- Cantabria, a Spanish replenishment vessel commissioned in 2010
- Cantabria (Madrid Metro)

== See also ==
- Cantabrian (disambiguation)
- Cantabrigian
