= Ferial de Boadilla (Madrid Metro) =

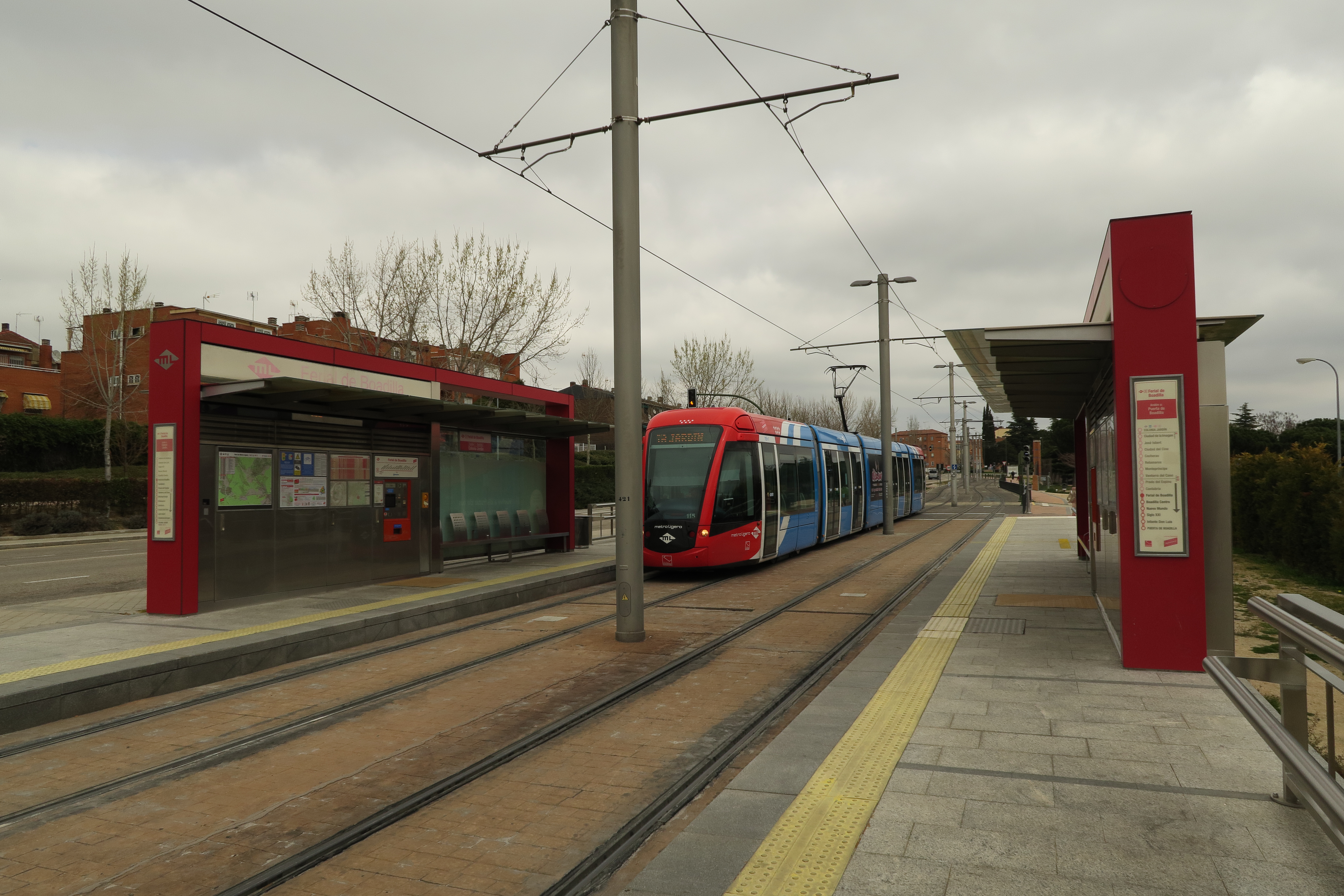

General information
- Location: Boadilla del Monte, Madrid; Spain
- Coordinates: 40.4019606°N 3.879383°W
- System: Madrid Metro station
- Owner: CRTM
- Operator: Metro Oeste

Other information
- Fare zone: B2

History
- Opened: 27 July 2007

Services
Preceding station	Madrid Metro	Following station
Cantabria towards Colonia Jardín	Line ML-3	Boadilla Centro towards Puerta de Boadilla
Location
- Location within Community of Madrid

Ferial de Boadilla [feˈɾjal ðe βoaˈðiʝa] is a station on Line 3 of the Metro Ligero. It is located in fare Zone B2.
