= Ventorro del Cano (Madrid Metro) =

Madrid Metro station

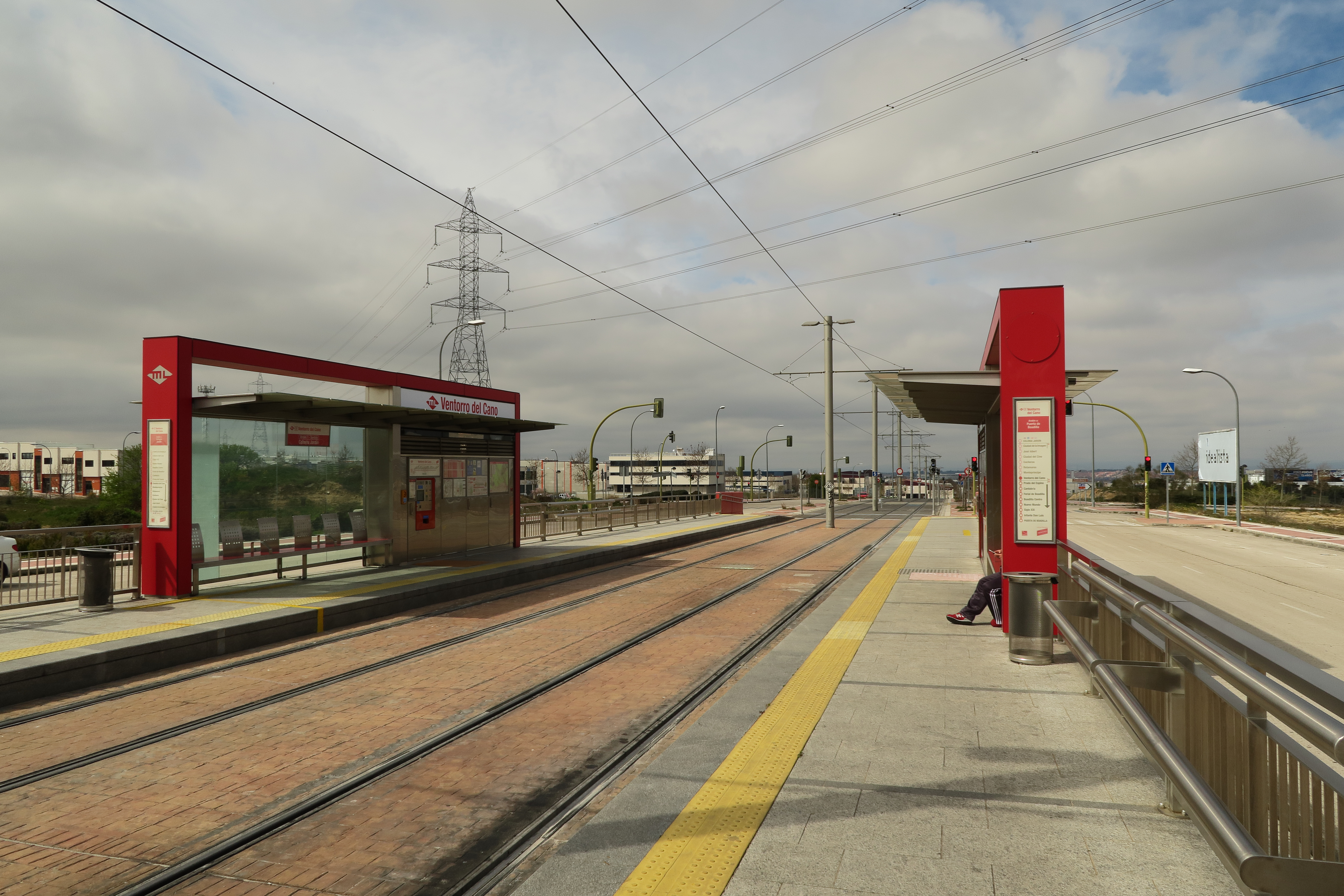

General information
- Location: Alcorcón, Madrid; Spain
- Coordinates: 40.3942037°N 3.8381129°W
- System: Madrid Metro station
- Owner: CRTM
- Operator: Metro Oeste

Other information
- Fare zone: B1

History
- Opened: 27 July 2007; 19 years ago

Services
Preceding station	Madrid Metro	Following station
Montepríncipe towards Colonia Jardín	Line ML-3	Prado del Espino towards Puerta de Boadilla
Location
- Location within Madrid

Ventorro del Cano [benˈtoro ðel ˈkano] is a station on Line 3 of the Metro Ligero. It is located in fare Zone B1.
