= Cantabria (Madrid Metro) =

Metro station in Madrid, Spain

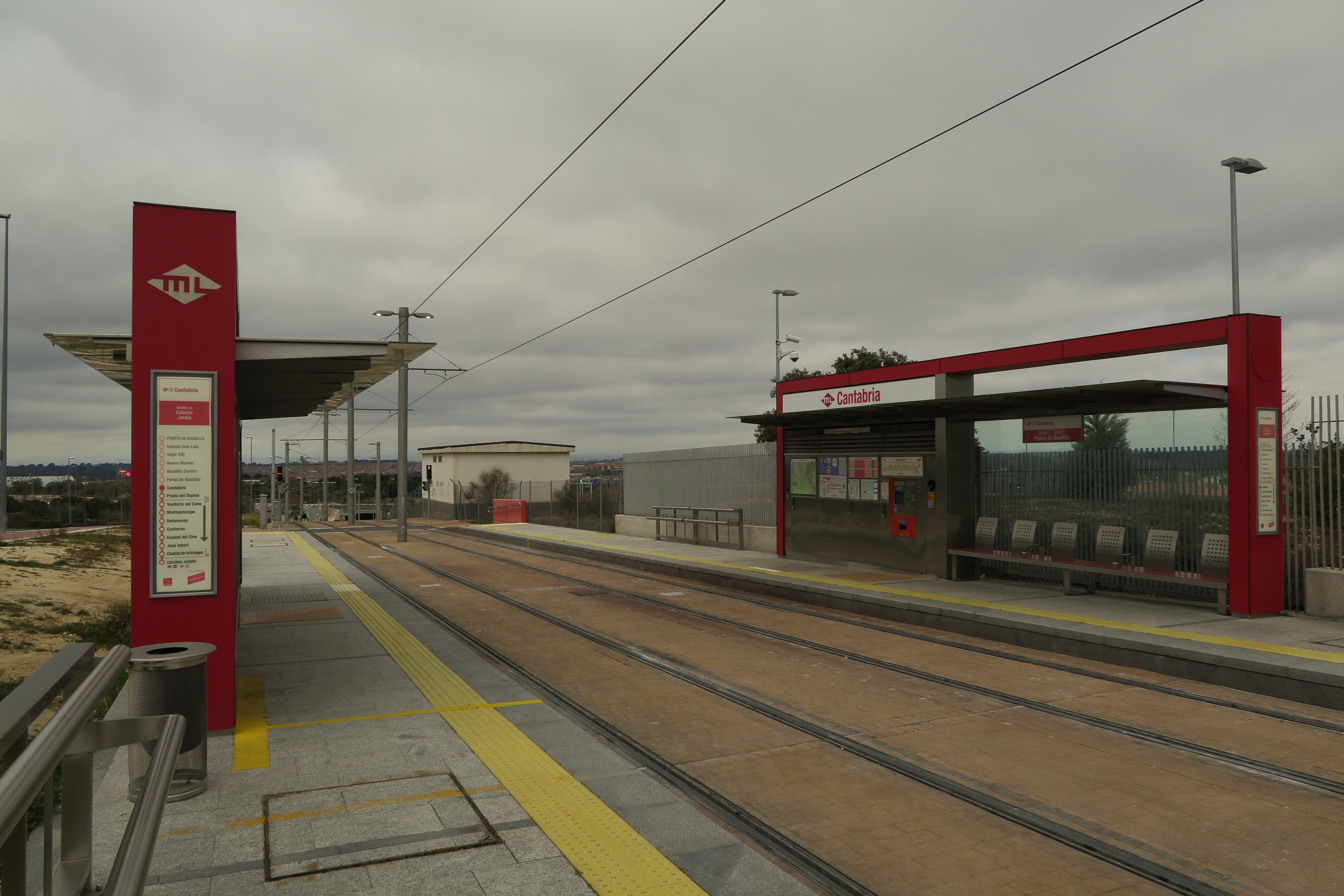

General information
- Location: Boadilla del Monte, Madrid; Spain
- Coordinates: 40.3952897°N 3.8643908°W
- System: Madrid Metro station
- Owner: CRTM
- Operator: Metro Oeste

Other information
- Fare zone: B2

History
- Opened: 27 July 2007; 19 years ago

Services
Preceding station	Madrid Metro	Following station
Prado del Espino towards Colonia Jardín	Line ML-3	Ferial del Boadilla towards Puerta de Boadilla
Location
- Location within Community of Madrid

Cantabria [kanˈtaβɾja] is a station on Line 3 of the Metro Ligero. It is located in fare Zone B2.
