= Infante Don Luis (Madrid Metro) =

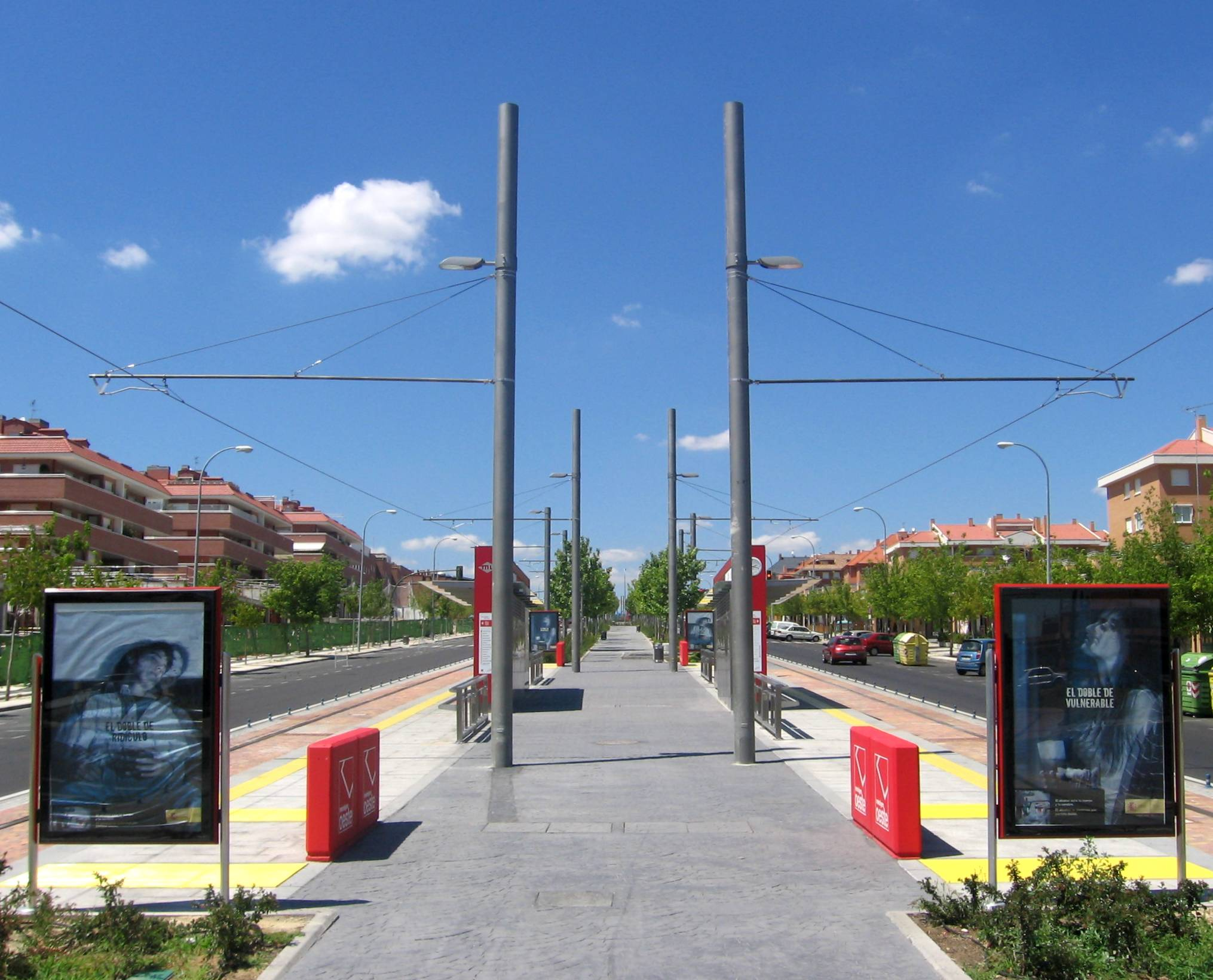

General information
- Location: Boadilla del Monte, Madrid; Spain
- Coordinates: 40.4059483°N 3.8974068°W
- System: Madrid Metro station
- Owner: CRTM
- Operator: Metro Oeste

Other information
- Fare zone: B2

History
- Opened: 27 July 2007; 19 years ago

Services
| Preceding station | Madrid Metro | Following station |
|---|---|---|
| Siglo XXI towards Colonia Jardín | Line ML-3 | Puerta de Boadilla Terminus |
Location
- Location within Community of Madrid

Infante Don Luis [iɱˈfante ˌðon ˈlwis] is a station on Line 3 of the Metro Ligero. It is located in fare Zone B2.
