= Isbert =

Isbert is a surname. Notable people with the surname include:

- José Isbert (José Ysbert Alvarruiz, 1886–1966), also known as Pepe Isbert, Spanish actor
  - José Isbert (Madrid Metro), station on Line 3 of the Metro Ligero
- Margot Benary-Isbert (1889–1979), German and later American writer of children's books
- María Isbert (1917–2011), Spanish actress
- Marion Isbert (born 1964), German footballer
