= Cocheras =

Cocheras may refer to:

- Cocheras (Madrid Metro)
- Cocheras (Seville Metro)
