= Ciudad de la Imagen (Madrid Metro) =

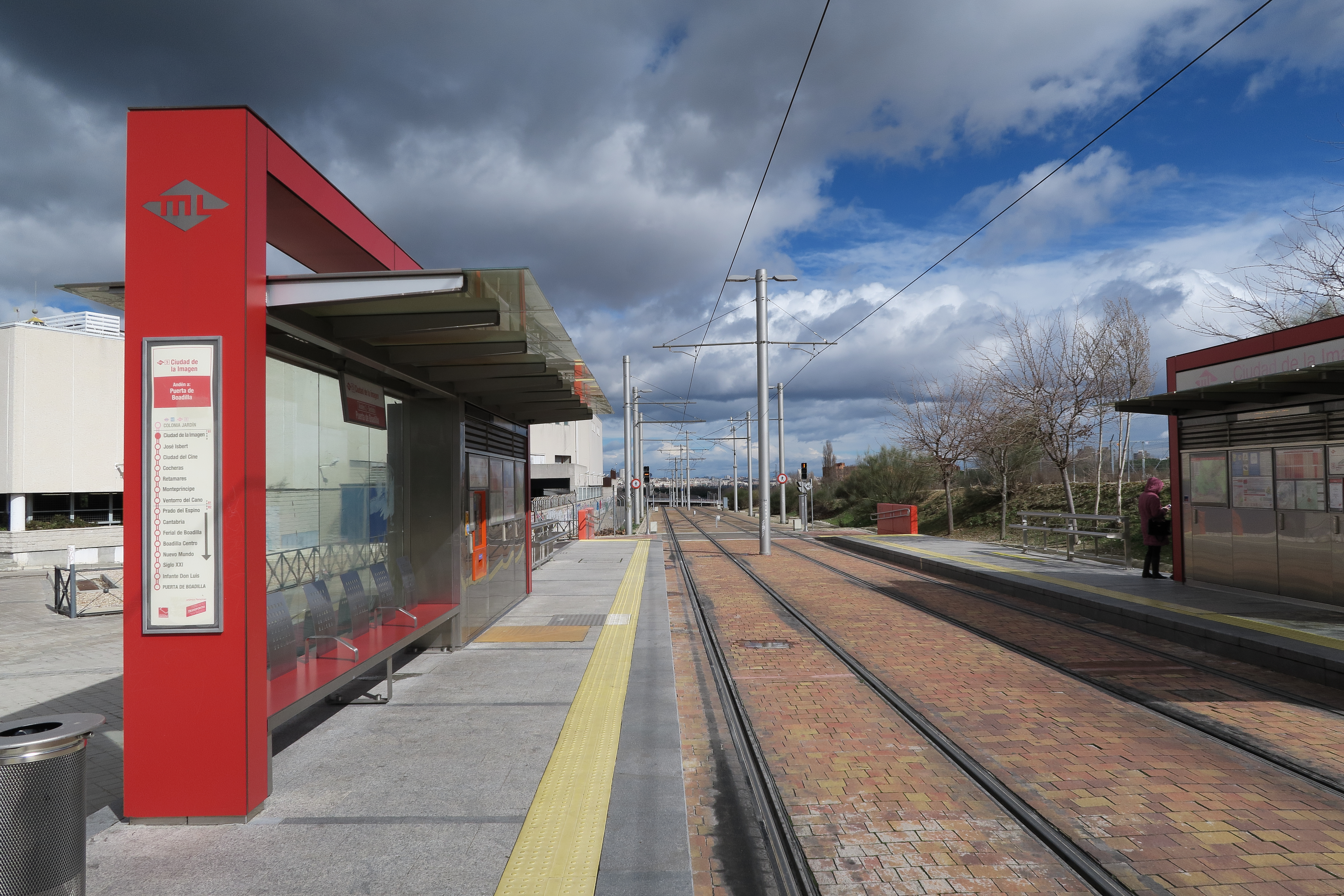

General information
- Location: Pozuelo de Alarcón, Madrid; Spain
- Coordinates: 40.3970875°N 3.7839922°W
- System: Madrid Metro station
- Owner: CRTM
- Operator: Metro Oeste

Other information
- Fare zone: B1

History
- Opened: 27 July 2007; 19 years ago

Services
Preceding station	Madrid Metro	Following station
Colonia Jardín Terminus	Line ML-3	José Isbert towards Puerta de Boadilla
Location
- Location within Madrid

Ciudad de la Imagen [θjuˈðað ðe la iˈmaxen] is a station on Line 3 of the Metro Ligero. It is located in fare Zone B1.
