= Tarjeta Transporte Público =

Payment method for public transport in Madrid

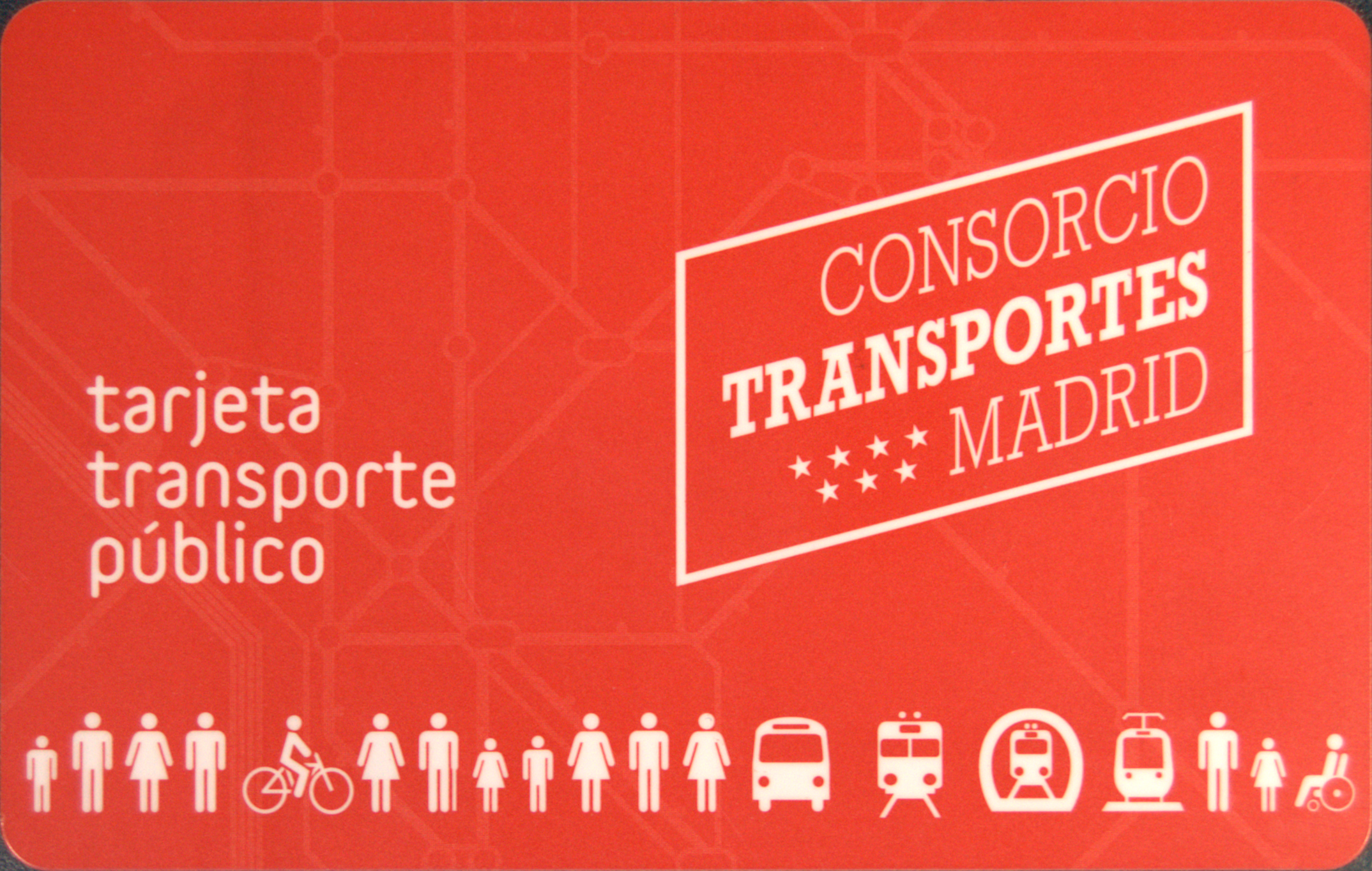
- Location: Community of Madrid, Spain
- Launched: 3 May 2012
- Technology: Contactless smart card
- Manager: Consorcio Regional de Transportes de Madrid
- Unlimited use: Abono Mensual; Abono Anual; Título Turístico
- Validity: Madrid Metro; Metro Ligero; Cercanías Madrid; EMT Madrid; CRTM Interurbanos
- Retailed: Ticket machines; CRTM offices; Online; Newsagents
- Variants: Tarjeta Personal; Tarjeta Multi; Tarjeta Infantil; Bus+Bus; Tarjeta Azul
- Website: tarjetatransportepublico.crtm.es

The Tarjeta Transporte Público (TTP; "Public Transport Card") is a payment method for public transport in Madrid, the capital of Spain, and its surrounding autonomous community. It is managed by the Consorcio Regional de Transportes de Madrid (CRTM), the body responsible for coordinating public transport in the Community of Madrid. As of 2019, more than 16 million TTPs are in circulation.

First introduced in 2012, the TTP is a credit card-sized contactless smart card, typically colored red, that can be used to facilitate travel on most modes of public transport in Madrid, including the Madrid Metro, the Metro Ligero, Cercanías Madrid, city buses operated by the Empresa Municipal de Transportes de Madrid (EMT), and privately run interurban regional buses managed by CRTM which serve towns and cities throughout the Community of Madrid. The TTP may also be used on certain long-distance buses between Madrid and nearby towns and cities in the neighboring autonomous community of Castilla–La Mancha, including Toledo and Guadalajara.

As of November 2024, an Android app has been launched that allows passengers to have a virtual TTP on their phones via Google Wallet and use it on all modes of transportation where the physical TTP is valid. This type of card is the TTP Multi, which only allows non-personalized transport tickets.

== History ==
Deploying a contactless smart card for public transit in Madrid has been planned since at least 2003, when CRTM launched a three-month pilot project to test contactless payments on some 30 buses in Fuenlabrada, after which it would have been extended to other modes of public transit that ran through the town. Although a full rollout of the card throughout Madrid was envisioned by 2007, by 2010 the only progress made was with launching in 2008 a contactless card for holders of the Abono Anual, CRTM's annual transport pass, whose passes covered the city of Madrid (zone A), and with another limited pilot program set for 2011.

The Tarjeta Transporte Público was launched on 3 May 2012 with the introduction of the Tarjeta Personal, a personalized card that was first rolled out to holders of the Abono Joven, CRTM's youth transport pass, whose passes were valid for zone A. CRTM received over 30,000 requests for information, and some 20,000 applications for the new card, within a month of its release. By July 2012, around 50,000 youths had already exchanged their magnetic stripe paper passes for TTPs, spurred by CRTM's decision to waive fees for changing to the TTP until the end of the month.

CRTM later extended the TTP to holders of its regular transport passes for zone A, with some 625,000 cards being issued within the card's first year, and leading to the elimination of paper passes for zone A on 30 June 2013. In 2014, CRTM began offering TTPs to persons over 65, and later extended the use of TTPs to include pass holders in the Community of Madrid's outer fare zones (zones B and C), with some 1.2 million cards already issued by August 2014. It was later announced on 14 January 2015 that the two millionth TTP was issued to a woman from Rivas-Vaciamadrid, and following the announcement of free public transport for children the same day, a children's version of the TTP, the Tarjeta Infantil, was introduced on 15 February 2015, with an initial batch of 7,000 cards being issued. TTPs were later offered to holders of a new transport pass for the unemployed on 16 November 2015.

TTPs were issued only to monthly pass holders until 7 July 2017, when CRTM introduced the Tarjeta Multi, a non-personalized version of the TTP which would replace all remaining paper tickets, including single-trip (except single-trip bus tickets, which are still purchased when boarding the bus), ten-trip (Metrobús) and tourist tickets. After nearly a century of use on public transport in Madrid, paper tickets were finally retired on 31 October 2017 with the full implementation of the TTP system-wide, although remaining tickets remained valid until the end of the year.

== Features ==
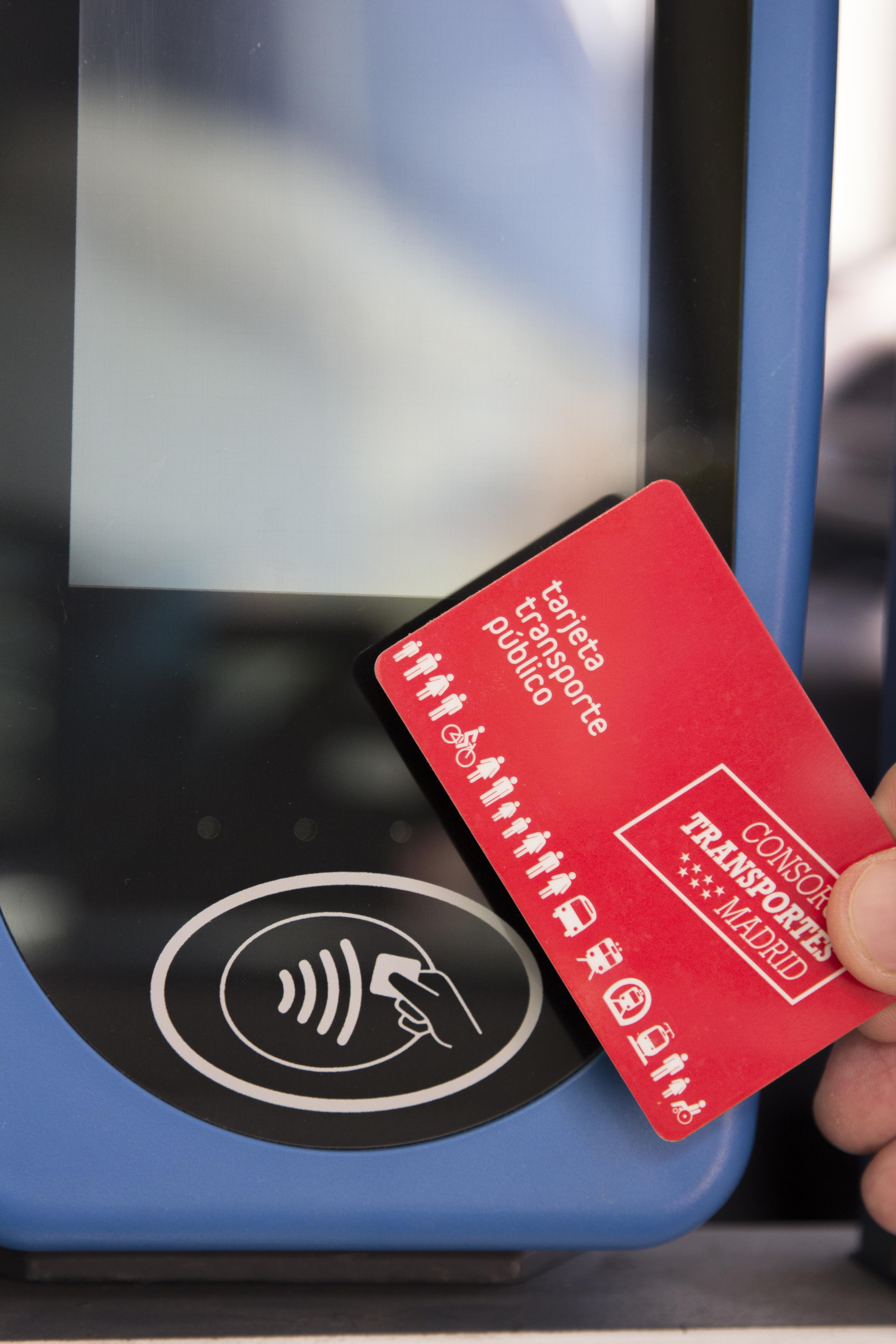
A Tarjeta Transporte Público being tapped against a card reader installed on a EMT Madrid-operated bus

The Tarjeta Transporte Público is underpinned by a broader system called the Sistema Universal de Billetaje Electrónico para el Transporte (Universal Transport Electronic Ticketing System), which incorporates the technology required to harmonize fare collection and facilitate access to public transport on all CRTM-regulated modes of transit. The system is maintained in-house at CRTM's Centro de Desarrollo y Conformidad (Development and Compliance Center), which is responsible for maintaining the unified ticketing system for all public transport operators in the Community of Madrid.

TTPs were initially valid for seven years from the date of issue, which was extended to ten years with the introduction of the Tarjeta Multi. Cards come with a two-year warranty, during which the card may be replaced for free in case of any manufacturing defects, and the Tarjeta Personal may be replaced either in person or online in case of theft or loss.

In 2013, CRTM introduced the option to customize the reverse of a Tarjeta Personal (the side which contains the holder's personal information) with designs such as country flags, symbols of Spain's autonomous communities, or promotional logos of Madrid. TTPs have also been produced with promotional or commemorative designs, such as with some 200,000 cards featuring famous works from Madrid's Golden Triangle of Art.

== Use ==
Unlike other contactless smart cards, the Tarjeta Transporte Público is not a stored-value card and a valid ticket or other pass required for the intended journey must be loaded onto the card before it can be used. The card is tapped against a green card reader on a turnstile which emits a sound when it is tapped against it.

Contrary to other systems like the T-Mobilitat, used in Barcelona and its surrounding regions, both the TTP and the TTP Personal allow loading several different tickets simultaneously. The only limitation is regarding fare zones, no two tickets can be applied to the same fare zone while loaded on a transport card. There is an exception to this rule: monthly and annual unlimited-travel tickets can be loaded alongside single or 10-trips tickets, although the unlimited-travel ticket will be used first. This allows anyone to use their TTP Personal for themselves and invite someone they are traveling with, without the need for an additional transport card.

== See also ==
- List of smart cards
- Navigo, a similar smart card system used in Paris
