= Parla Tram =

Streetcar system in Parla, Spain

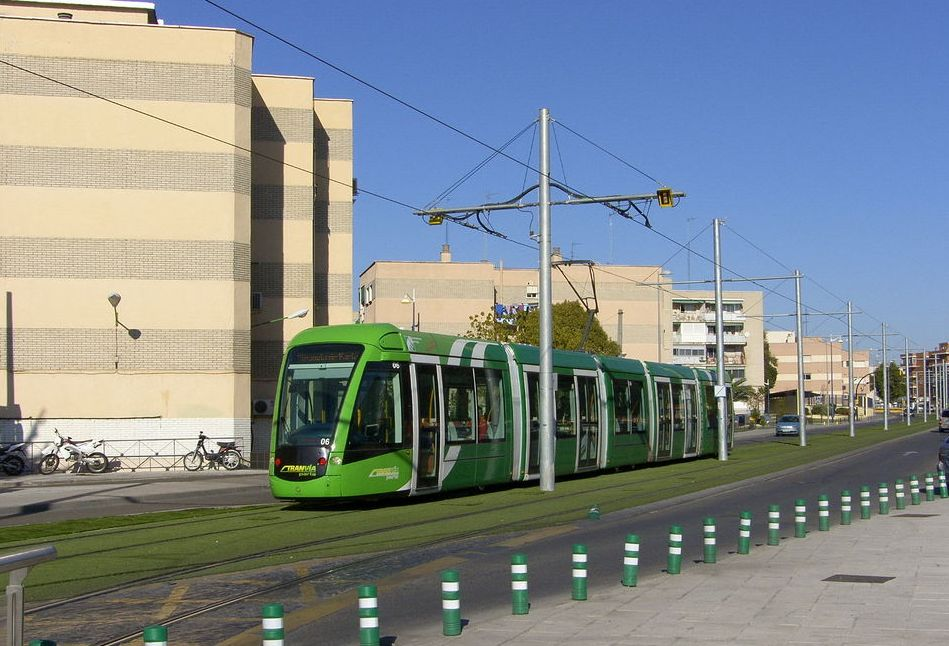
- Parla Tram in a partially segregated right-of-way

Overview
- Native name: Tranvía de Parla
- Stations: 15

History
- Opened: 6 May 2007; 18 years ago

Technical
- Line length: 8.3 km (5.2 mi)
- Track gauge: 1,435 mm (4 ft 8 1/2 in) standard gauge
- Electrification: 750 V DC

Parla Tram map (including the planned stop at Parla Norte)

The Parla Tram (Spanish: Tranvía de Parla) is a tram system operating in the city of Parla in the Community of Madrid, Spain. As of January 2026, the network consists of a single circular route, with trams running continuously in both directions around the loop. The network is operated by the Tranvía de Parla S.A. company, whose main shareholder is Globalvia (a Spanish private infrastructure company) with 85%; CCM owns the remaining 15%.

Although neither Tranvía de Parla S.A. nor Metro de Madrid S.A. officially lists the Parla Tram as part of Madrid's Metro Ligero network, the Regional Transport Consortium of Madrid (CRTM) designates it as such and gives it the route number ML4, and such a classification can often also be found in unofficial settings.

== Project ==
This is a project promoted by the local administration of Parla. Opened on 6 May 2007 (Phase I), and 8 September 2007 (Phase II), can be the journey between the stations Plaza de Toros to Parla Industrial City until completion of the works of the station North Parla (which is still to be opened and will house a railway interchange with Cercanías Madrid).

It consists of a circular line of 15 stations with stops every 500 meters (1,600 ft), a total length of 8.3 km (5.2 mi) (similar to the Montpellier tramway). It connects the city center with new urban developments (Parla Este among them) and points of interest in the city such as the Commissioner of Police, health and cultural centers, shopping centers, etc. There is a connection with the Parla station of Cercanías Madrid located in downtown Parla and in future with a new station in the north of the city. Along with the construction of the tram, there have been "park and ride" facilities built throughout the city to promote the use of public transport.

=== Extensions ===
There were plans to eventually build two more lines, also circular.

- "Line 2" would run to PAU-5, located on the banks of the A-42, to aid in the development of the Parla industrial park.
- "Line 3" would serve the future developments of southern Parla and the hospital and the new commuter train station to be located in the south of the city.

Given the financial crisis facing the city there are many questions about the economic feasibility of extending the system. As of January 2020, Parla Tram remains a single line.

== Ticketing ==
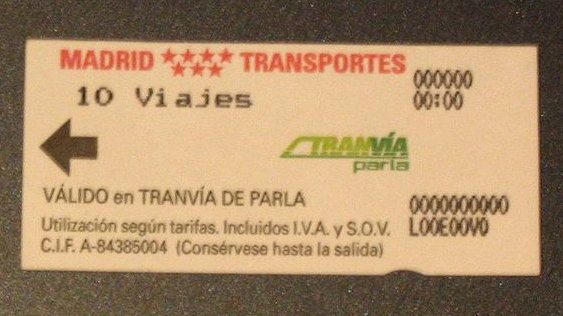
10 trip ticket

The ticket price is similar to urban bus lines in the city. Madrid regional travel passes are valid (at least B2 zone).

== Capacity ==
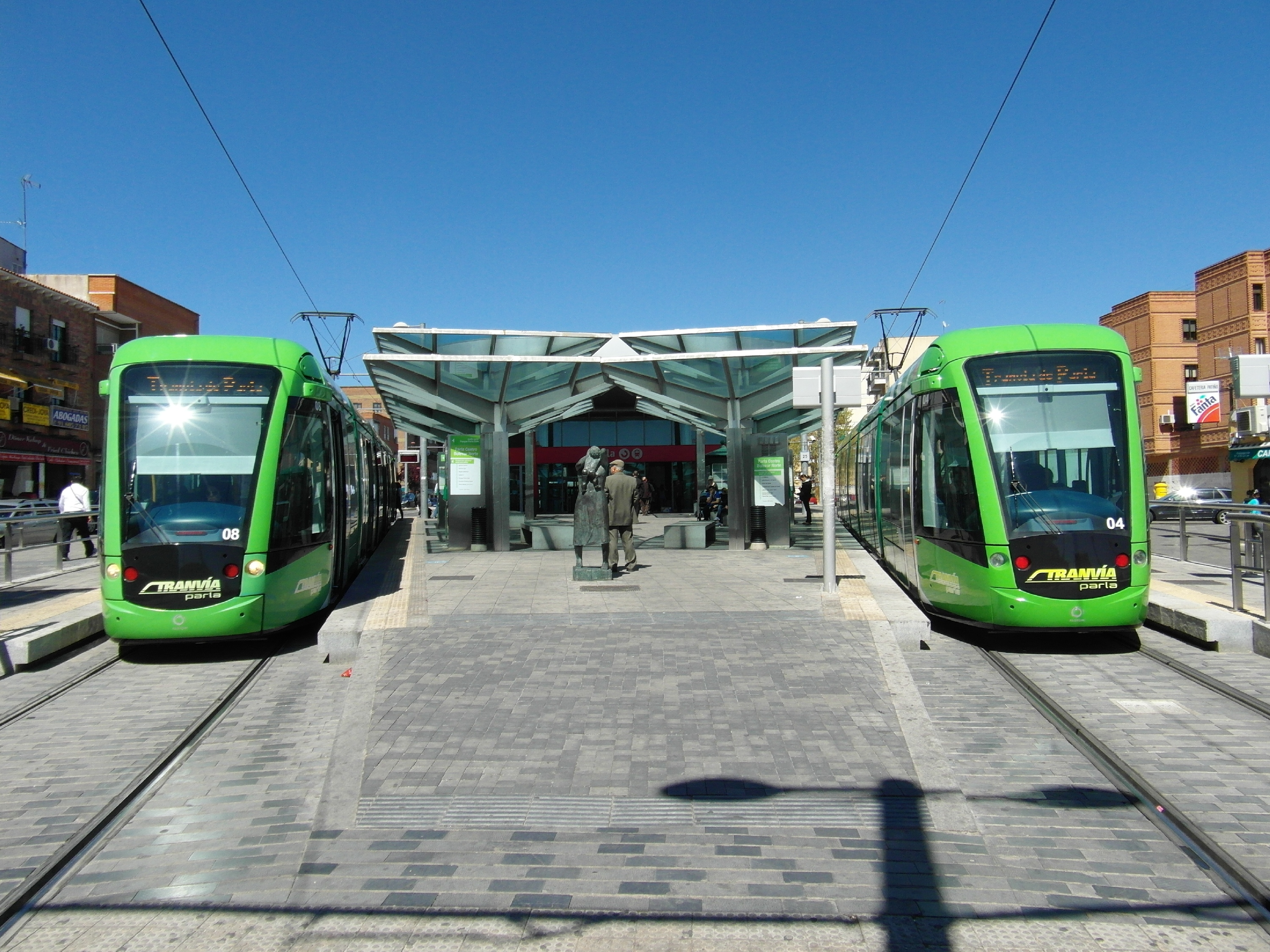
Parla Tram station.

Parla Tram uses the Alstom Citadis 302, with a maximum capacity of 220 passengers, being the same amount as three buses. This model is the same used in Trambaix and Trambesòs in Barcelona, Tenerife Tram, Murcia Tram, and Madrid's Metro Ligero.

== See also ==
- Light rail
- Transportation in Spain
