= Cantabrian =

Cantabrian or Cantabrians may refer to:

- People and things related to the modern Spanish autonomous community and historical region of Cantabria
  - Cantabrian people, modern inhabitants of Cantabria
  - Basques, as they were sometimes referred during Modern Age
  - Cantabrian Mountains, mountain range in Northern Spain
  - Cantabrian Sea, southern end of the Bay of Biscay
  - Cantabrian dialect, also known as montañés, a Romance language variety belonging to Asturleonese, spoken in northern Spain
  - Cantabri, the ancient Celtic inhabitants of Cantabria
  - Cantabrian Wars, war during the Roman conquest of the ancient Cantabria and Asturias
  - Cantabrian circle, a military tactic employed by ancient Cantabri horse archers
- People from the region of Canterbury, New Zealand

== See also ==
- Cantabrigian
- Cantabria
