= Metro Ligero =

Light rail tram system in Madrid, Spain

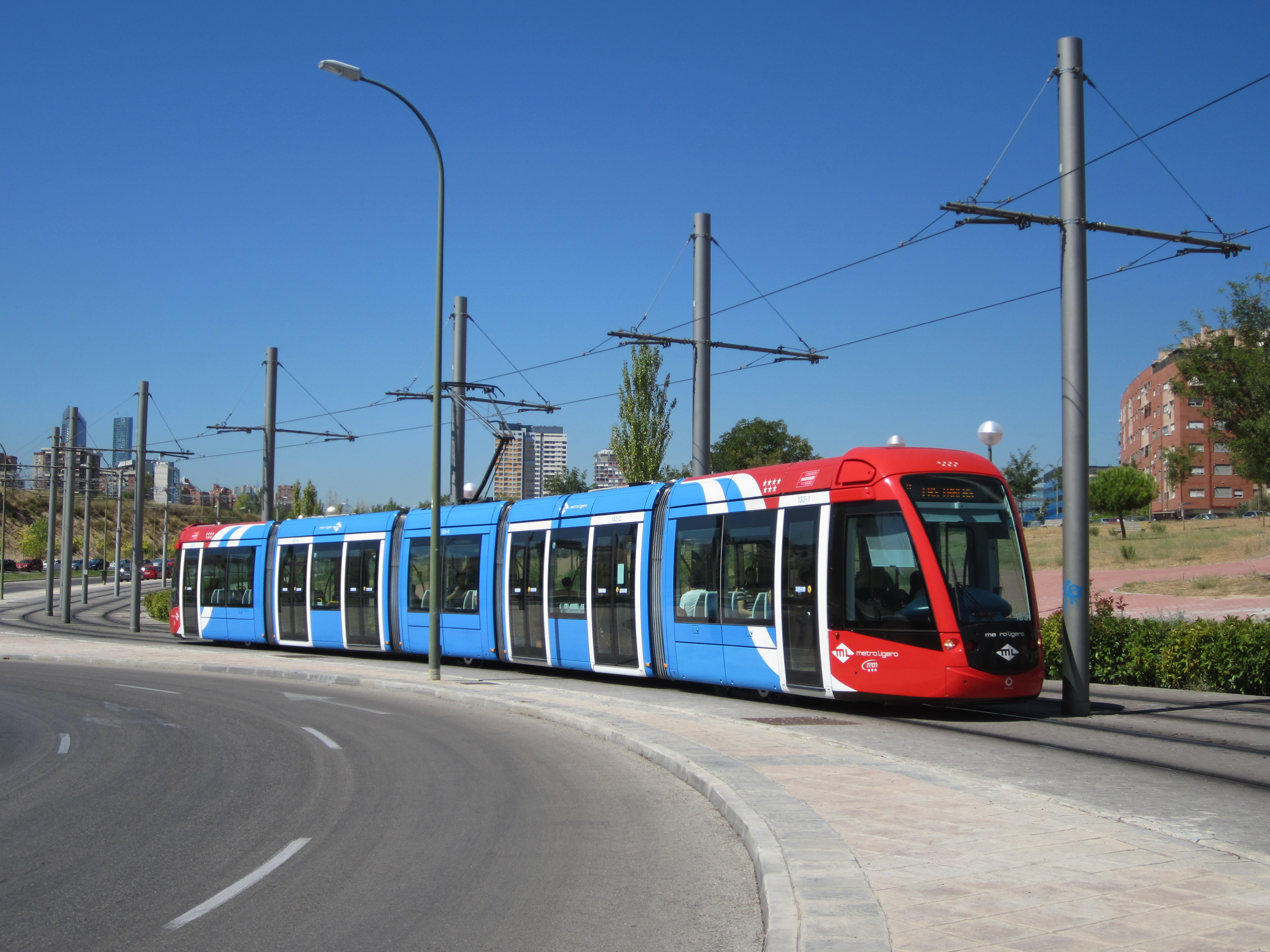
- A tram on line ML1

Overview
- Owner: Autonomous Government of the Community of Madrid
- Locale: Madrid
- Transit type: Tram
- Number of lines: 3
- Number of stations: 37
- Website: www.metrosligerosdemadrid.es www.metroligero-oeste.es

Operation
- Began operation: 24 May 2007; 19 years ago

Technical
- System length: 27.8 km (17.3 mi)
- Track gauge: 1,435 mm (4 ft 8 1/2 in) standard gauge
- Electrification: 750 V DC

The Metro Ligero (Spanish pronunciation: [ˈmetɾo liˈxeɾo]; literally "Light Metro") is a modern tram system serving the Spanish capital city of Madrid and its surrounding municipalities. As of October 2026, it consists of 37 stops shared between three lines, with a total network length of 27.8 kilometres (17.3 miles).

The system was built as a light-rail extension to the much larger heavy-rail Madrid Metro. Despite being a distinct service with separate branding, it is featured on the official Madrid Metro network map; the three routes are depicted with thin double-lines, contrasting with thick solid lines used for the Metro network itself.

== History ==
Metro Ligero is not the first tramway system to have operated in Madrid throughout its history – until the 1970s, the city had been served by an extensive network of streetcars. This traditional network was built with tracks that ran on the city's streets, rather than on segregated routes that modern tram systems are known for. The streetcar system first opened in 1871 and enjoyed its heyday years during the 1950s, with 188 kilometres (117 miles) of track and more than 500 vehicles in operation. However, with the increasing popularity of motor traffic, the network quickly began declining and partially closing down during the 1960s. Shortly after celebrating its 100th anniversary, the whole system closed definitively in 1972, with the last passenger service operating in early June of that year. Today, one of the old streetcars from the era is exhibited in the concourse of the Pinar de Chamartín interchange.

The scheme to build the modern Metro Ligero network was first announced in 2003. This formed part of a much larger plan to expand the rail rapid transit system throughout Madrid and its urban area; the plan was labelled as the most ambitious rail project in the region to date, following a period of already extensive enlargement of the Madrid Metro network over the previous eight years. Although expanding the Metro network itself was also a significant part of this project, the light-rail, tram-based Metro Ligero system was devised for communities whose populations had not been deemed sufficient to financially justify the construction of new heavy-rail metro routes.

Construction work began in December 2004, on the route through the Sanchinarro and Las Tablas neighbourhoods in the north of the city (now known as line ML1). The work lasted just over two years and the line opened to the public on 24 May 2007, officially reintroducing trams to the city of Madrid after a 35-year-long absence. Work on two other lines, in the towns of Pozuelo de Alarcón and Boadilla del Monte to the west of the capital, was carried out in parallel; these lines, later named ML2 and ML3, officially opened to passengers two months after the ML1, on 27 July 2007.

== Lines ==
As of October 2026, the Metro Ligero network comprises three lines, numbered ML1, ML2 and ML3. (Note: The Parla Tram is often unofficially classified as part of the Metro Ligero network and given the number ML4. Such a designation can even sometimes be found in official settings, such as on the CRTM website. However, the company responsible for operating the Parla Tram, Tranvía de Parla S.A., does not label its system as part of the Metro Ligero – instead, it sports its own branding and makes no references to the Metro Ligero network on the trams, at tram stops or on the official website. The Madrid Metro likewise does not list the Parla Tram as part of the Metro Ligero system and, unlike Metro Ligero, the Parla Tram system is not included on any Metro maps. For this reason, and because the Parla Tram has no interchanges with the rest of the Madrid Metro or Metro Ligero networks and is located a significant distance away from both of them, it is not included in this article.) Despite being branded as a single unified system, it is structurally two smaller disjointed networks, with line ML1 being located over 10 kilometres (6 mi) northeast of the other two lines.

Line ML1 – coloured blue on transport maps – is the shortest of the three lines at 5.4 kilometres (3.4 mi), as well as the only one to run wholly within Madrid's municipal borders. It primarily serves the neighbourhoods of Sanchinarro (in the Hortaleza district) and Las Tablas (in the Fuencarral-El Pardo district) in the north of the city, connecting them to other rail services in neighbouring areas. Its southern terminus is at the Pinar de Chamartín stop in Ciudad Lineal, where it has an interchange with Metro lines 1 and 4; from there, the line heads north, with a stop at Fuente de la Mora offering an interchange with Madrid's suburban rail (Cercanías) network before serving the Sanchinarro neighbourhood with five intermediate stops. The line then continues northwest through the Las Tablas area with two more stops; its northern terminus is at the Las Tablas stop, which offers an interchange with Metro line 10.

Lines ML2 and ML3, on the other hand, run almost entirely outside the municipality of Madrid. The lines share a terminus at the Colonia Jardín stop located at the western edge of the Latina district of Madrid, but both lines leave the city a short distance west of the stop. Colonia Jardín offers the two lines a convenient interchange with one another, as well as with Metro line 10 for onward travel to the rest of Madrid.

Line ML2 – coloured purple on transport maps – is 8.7 kilometres (5.4 miles) long. After Colonia Jardín, it runs in a broadly northerly direction, serving many parts of the town of Pozuelo de Alarcón (including the Los Ángeles and Somosaguas neighbourhoods, the town centre, and the Somosaguas campus of the Complutense University of Madrid). While the eleven intermediate stops on the line are all within Pozuelo de Alarcón, the line's northern terminus is at the Estación de Aravaca stop, which is back within the borders of Madrid (in the Moncloa-Aravaca district); the stop also has an out-of-station interchange with Aravaca station on Madrid's suburban rail network.

Line ML3 – shown on transport maps with a bright red colour – is the longest line on the network, with a length of 13.7 kilometres (8.5 miles). After Colonia Jardín, it quickly parts ways with the ML2 and instead heads west, primarily serving the southernmost edge of Pozuelo de Alarcón and the southern neighbourhoods of the municipality of Boadilla del Monte, including its town centre. The line has sixteen stops, of which one (Colonia Jardín) is in Madrid, five (between Ciudad de la Imagen and Retamares inclusive) are within Pozuelo de Alarcón, while eight (between Prado del Espino and the eastern terminus at Puerta de Boadilla inclusive) are located in Boadilla del Monte. The two stops at Montepríncipe and Ventorro del Cano, while adjacent to the Montepríncipe urban area of Boadilla del Monte, are actually located within the boundaries of the city of Alcorcón, despite lying over 5 kilometres (3 miles) northwest of Alcorcón's city centre.

Line	Termini	Opened	Length	Stops	Municipalities (and districts) served	Route diagram
Metro Ligero	Pinar de Chamartín – Las Tablas	24 May 2007	5.4 km (3.4 mi)	9	Madrid (Ciudad Lineal, Hortaleza, Fuencarral-El Pardo)	uKINTa uHST; PORTALf utHST uHST; PORTALg utINT utKINTe
Metro Ligero	Colonia Jardín – Estación de Aravaca	27 July 2007	8.7 km (5.4 mi)	13	Madrid (Latina, Moncloa-Aravaca); Pozuelo de Alarcón	uKINTa uSTR+GRZq uHST; PORTALf utHST uHST; PORTALg uHST uepHST uSTR+GRZq; PORTALf utKINTe
Metro Ligero	Colonia Jardín – Puerta de Boadilla	27 July 2007	13.7 km (8.5 mi)	16	Madrid (Latina); Pozuelo de Alarcón; Alcorcón; Boadilla del Monte	uKHSTa uHST uepHST uSTR+GRZq; PORTALf utSTRa uCHST; PORTALfg utSTRe utKINTe

=== Service frequencies ===
Services on the Metro Ligero network are in operation every day between 06:00 and 01:30. All services are timetabled to run the full length of their route, from one terminus to the other.

Line ML1 operates with a base frequency of every 8-9 minutes in each direction Monday–Saturday, although during the weekday rush hour period this is increased to every 5 minutes (morning peak) or 6 minutes (evening peak). Sunday services run every 12 minutes each way throughout most of the day. On Fridays and Saturdays, the basic 8- to 9-minute frequency is maintained until the end of service, while on the other days of the week, services are reduced to every 15-20 minutes after about 22:00.

Lines ML2 and ML3 both have a Monday–Friday service frequency of up to every 6 minutes per direction in the morning peak, every 7-10 minutes during the evening peak, and approximately every 13 minutes at off-peak periods. On Saturdays, services run at 20-minute intervals each way, while on Sundays (as well as on all other days after about 22:30) they run every 30 minutes.

Line ML3 is unique on the Metro Ligero network in that it operates express services. These originate at the Puerta de Boadilla stop, call at all stops as far as Ferial de Boadilla before running non-stop all the way to the terminus at Colonia Jardín; there are no corresponding express services in the opposite direction. These limited-stop workings run only on weekdays during the morning peak period, with four such services per day at approximately 30-minute intervals. All other services on all three lines call at every intermediate stop en route.

== Operators ==
Unlike the Madrid Metro, which is almost entirely managed directly by the local government through the Metro de Madrid S.A. public company, the Metro Ligero network is instead operated on a 30-year concession basis. Line ML1 is run by Metros Ligeros de Madrid S.A., a consortium of Metro de Madrid S.A. and two private transport companies. Lines ML2 and ML3, meanwhile, are managed by Metro Ligero Oeste S.A. (MLO), a fully private consortium consisting of three shareholders. Both concessions are due to expire in 2036.

== Infrastructure ==
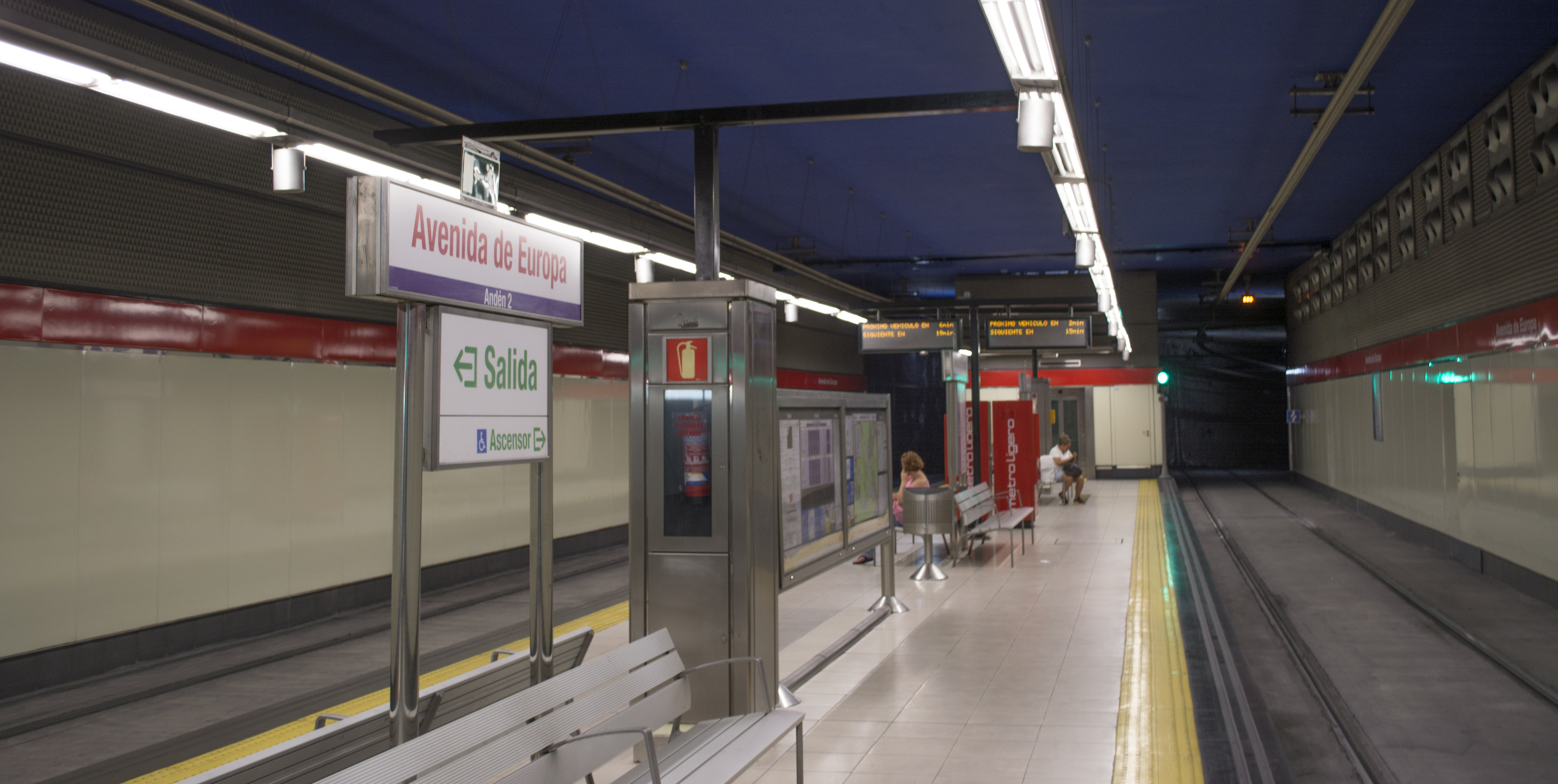
Avenida de Europa stop on line ML2 is one of only eight stops on the network that are below ground.

A unit at the Las Tablas stop, at the northern end of line ML1. The platform on the right is not in regular use.

The Metro Ligero network operates on 1,435 mm (4 ft 8 1/2 in) standard gauge tracks, electrified with overhead lines using direct current at 750 V.

Most of the Metro Ligero network is at ground level and in an open system, with tracks running in segregated rights-of-way parallel to local streets and usually crossing them by means of ungated level crossings. While line ML1 has some significant tunnelled sections, with approximately half of the line running below ground level, lines ML2 and ML3 run almost exclusively on or above ground with only a handful of short tunnels. This is all in contrast with the heavy-rail Madrid Metro network, which is wholly grade-separated and runs almost entirely underground.

Since many parts of the network operate at street level, thus requiring cooperation with the Spanish road system, the Metro Ligero trams always run on the right-hand track. This is again unlike the Madrid Metro, whose trains run on the left.

All stops on the Metro Ligero system are built with two platform tracks. This includes the terminus stops, at which usually only one track is in use (thus leaving the other platform out of service), except at Colonia Jardín where one platform is dedicated to line ML2 while the other is used by line ML3. The 37 stops all have platforms long enough to accommodate trams of up to 45 metres (150 ft) in length; 24 stops are built with two side platforms (meaning vehicles open their doors on the right-hand side), while the remaining 13 feature a single central island platform (with vehicles opening their left-hand doors).

The network is wheelchair-accessible in its entirety, with all 37 stops offering full step-free access. For street-level stops, wheelchair access is trivial, while in the case of stops located in tunnels or in cuttings, access is provided by lifts to all platforms.

There are two maintenance depots on the system. Line ML1's depot is located in Hortaleza, a short distance east of the Fuente de la Mora stop, next to Madrid Metro's own Hortaleza depot that serves lines 1 and 4; lines ML2 and ML3 both have one shared depot located in the southwestern corner of Pozuelo de Alarcón, adjacent to the Cocheras stop on the ML3.

== Rolling stock ==
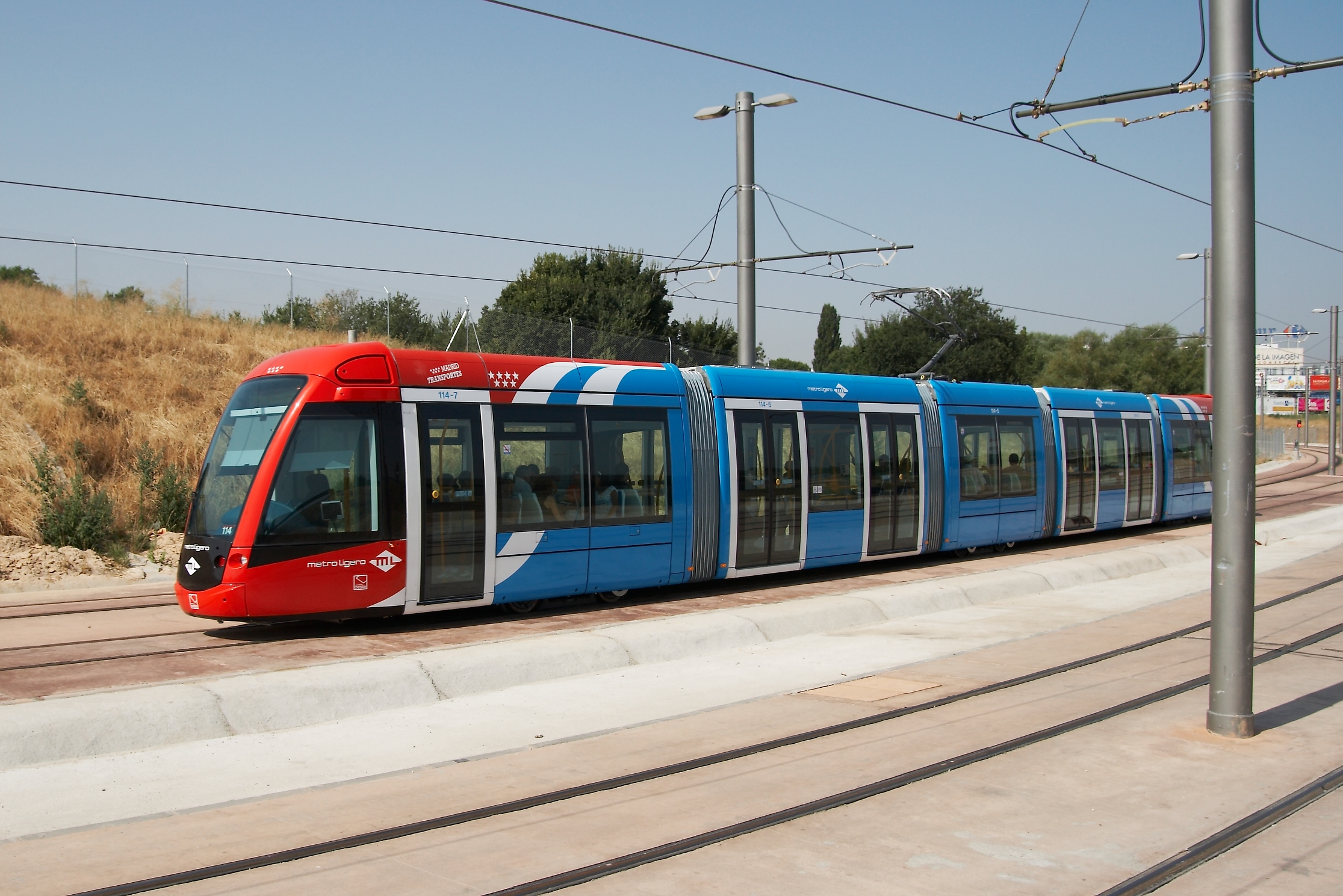
An Alstom Citadis 302 tram in service on line ML3

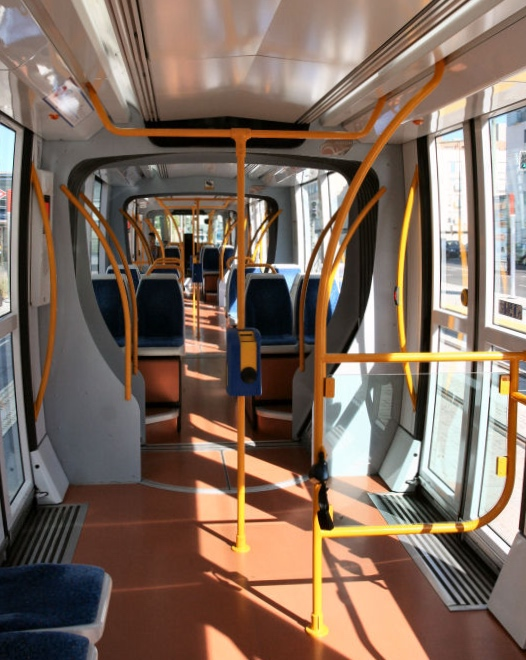
Interior of a Metro Ligero vehicle

The fleet that operates the Metro Ligero network has been wholly composed of low-floor Alstom Citadis 302 trams since its inception. The same model of trams is also used in several other cities in Spain, including Tenerife, Murcia, and the two unconnected tram networks of Barcelona (Trambaix and Trambesòs), as well as in the nearby town of Parla.

The trams have a total length of 30 metres (100 ft), allowing them to carry up to 204 passengers, 54 of whom seated; they are designed such that they can be extended to 45 metres (150 ft) in the future, subject to demand. The vehicles have a maximum speed of 70 km/h (43 mph).

The size of the Metro Ligero fleet has been reduced since the network first opened, with several trams subsequently sold to Adelaide, Australia for use on the Glenelg line. Six units were sent to Adelaide in May 2009, and a further three in December 2017.

== Ticketing system and fares ==
As is the case for all other public transportation systems within the Community of Madrid, the ticketing and fare systems on the Metro Ligero are controlled by the Consorcio Regional de Transportes de Madrid (CRTM), a public body owned by a consortium of local governments. Travelling on the Metro Ligero network requires the obtainment of a contactless Public Transport Card, of which there are two types: the Multicard (obtainable from all Metro Ligero stops), and the Personal Card (obtainable only by appointment).

The majority of the light-rail network instead operates under the honour system, with ticket validators on the trams where passengers are required to tap their Public Transport Card immediately after boarding. However, some of the busier stops also include ticket barriers.

For single-use tickets, Metro Ligero's ticketing system is unified with that of the Madrid Metro. The combined "Metro + Metro Ligero" system is divided into six fare zones; line ML1 lies inside the MetroMadrid zone together with the parts of the Metro that are within the municipality of Madrid, while lines ML2 and ML3 have their own dedicated fare zone known as MetroLigeroOeste.

For day passes and season tickets, the CRTM has its own ticketing system, which allows unlimited travel on all local public transport in the Community of Madrid – namely, the Madrid Metro, Metro Ligero, Madrid's suburban rail (Cercanías), urban and interurban bus services, and the Parla Tram. The CRTM divides the whole public transport network into eight zones named A, B1, B2, B3, C1, C2, E1 and E2; zone A is bounded by the borders of the city of Madrid itself, while the remaining zones form progressively larger approximate rings around the city. The Metro Ligero network lies entirely within the first three of these zones:

- Zone A covers all of line ML1, the Colonia Jardín stop on the ML2/ML3, and the Estación de Aravaca stop on the ML2;
- Zone B1 covers the rest of line ML2 and the section of line ML3 between Ciudad de la Imagen and Ventorro del Cano stops inclusive (i.e., the parts of the network located in the municipalities of Pozuelo de Alarcón and Alcorcón);
- Zone B2 covers the westernmost section of line ML3, between Prado del Espino and Puerta de Boadilla inclusive (i.e., the stops within the borders of Boadilla del Monte).

== Expansion proposals ==
Although there have been several plans to expand the Metro Ligero network, including some before opening, as of October 2026 the system has not seen any extensions since its full launch in 2007.

In 2003, while the Metro Ligero project was still in its infancy, the Community of Madrid proposed to build another tram line entirely outside the city of Madrid, which was to link the city of Móstoles with the municipality of Navalcarnero, via the Parque Coimbra neighbourhood. It would have had a length of approximately 13 kilometres (8 miles) and it would have been built simultaneously with the other three Metro Ligero lines, with inauguration planned for April 2007. The line would have been isolated from the rest of the Metro Ligero network, but it would have had an interchange with line 12 of the Madrid Metro – as well as with the local suburban rail (Cercanías) network – at Móstoles Central station. In 2006, however, this proposal was abandoned in favour of extending the Cercanías line itself beyond Móstoles to Navalcarnero – although that plan was eventually also shelved in 2010, after construction had already started. While the Navalcarnero rail project was revived in 2026 with the Spanish government funding a feasibility study, this study will only examine the possibility of extending of the suburban railway; the old Metro Ligero proposal is no longer considered.

In 2008, shortly after the first three lines became fully operational, plans were afoot to construct a fourth line, linking Pozuelo de Alarcón with Las Rozas de Madrid via Majadahonda. The line would have served the town centres of the three municipalities, as well as the Puerta de Hierro Hospital in Majadahonda, several large industrial estates, and local shopping and entertainment centres in the northwest of Las Rozas de Madrid. In Pozuelo de Alarcón the line would have connected with the existing line ML2, while at the other end, it would have terminated at Pinar de las Rozas railway station, giving the line an interchange with the local suburban rail network. This project was cancelled later that same year after local opposition.

In September 2026, the president of the Community of Madrid Isabel Díaz Ayuso announced a plan to extend the existing line ML3 at its western end, beyond Puerta de Boadilla to a new terminus in the Valenoso neighbourhood. The extension is to include approximately 1.5 kilometres (0.93 miles) of new track and two new stops, although the exact route and location of the stops was not announced. This project would require amendments to be made to the existing concession that operates the line.

== See also ==
- Madrid Metro
- List of tram and light rail transit systems
