= Colonia Jardín (Madrid Metro) =

Madrid Metro station

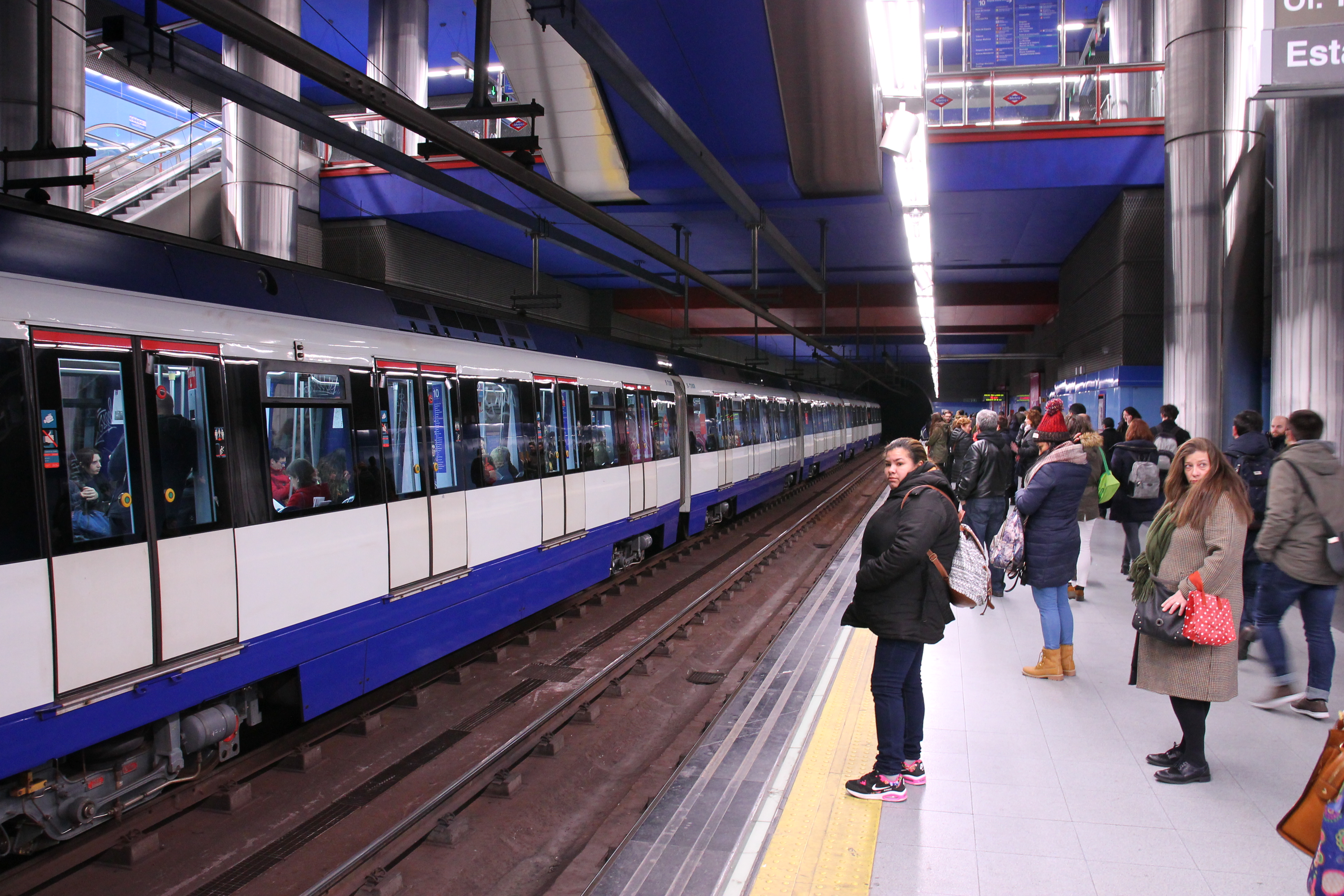
- Platforms of the station of the line 10

General information
- Location: Latina, Madrid; Spain
- Coordinates: 40.3969795°N 3.7746114°W
- System: Madrid Metro station
- Owner: CRTM
- Operator: CRTM; Metro Oeste

Construction
- Accessible: yes

Other information
- Fare zone: A

History
- Opened: 22 October 2002; 23 years ago

Services
Preceding station	Madrid Metro	Following station
Casa de Campo towards Hospital Infanta Sofía	Line 10	Aviación Española towards Puerta del Sur
Terminus	Line ML-2	Prado de la Vega towards Estación de Aravaca
Terminus	Line ML-3	Ciudad de la Imagen towards Puerta de Boadilla
Location
- Location within Madrid

Colonia Jardín [koˈlonja xaɾˈðin] is a station on Line 10 of the Madrid Metro and Lines 2 and 3 of the Metro Ligero, serving the Colonia Jardín ("Garden Colony") development. It is located in fare Zone A.
