= Puerta de Boadilla (Madrid Metro) =

Light metro station in Madrid

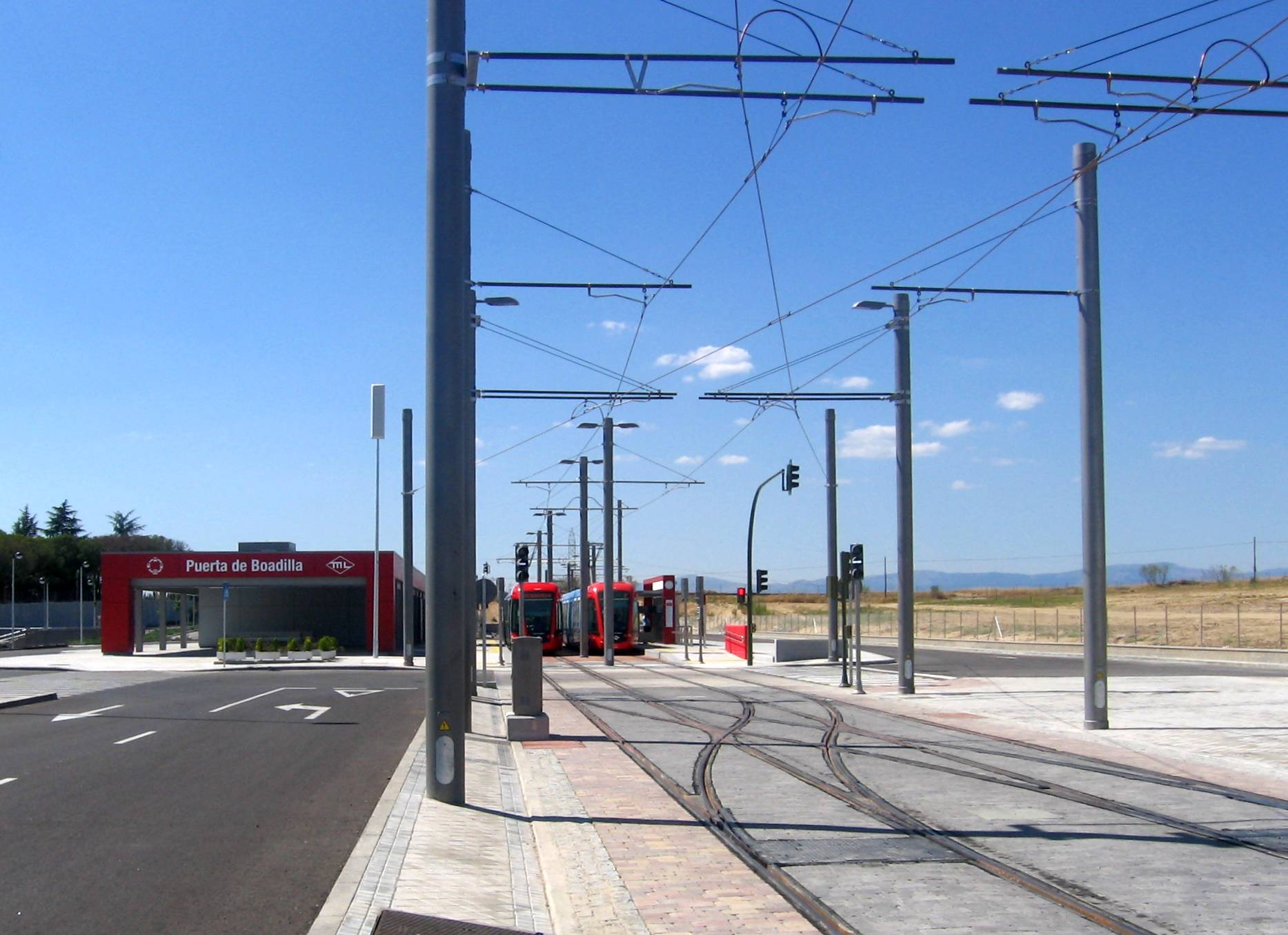

General information
- Location: Boadilla del Monte, Madrid; Spain
- Coordinates: 40.4077726°N 3.9037832°W
- System: Madrid Metro station
- Owner: CRTM
- Operator: Metro Oeste

Other information
- Fare zone: B2

History
- Opened: 27 July 2007; 19 years ago

Services
Preceding station	Madrid Metro	Following station
Infante Don Luís towards Colonia Jardín	Line ML-3	Terminus
Location
- Location within Community of Madrid

Puerta de Boadilla [ˈpweɾta ðe βoaˈðiʝa] is a station on Line 3 of the Metro Ligero. It is located in fare Zone B2.
