= Pozuelo =

Pozuelo may refer to:

== People ==
- Alejandro Pozuelo, Spanish footballer
- Nemesio Pozuelo, Soviet footballer

== Places ==
- Pozuelo, Albacete, municipality in Albacete
- Pozuelo de Alarcón, municipality in the Community of Madrid
- Pozuelo de Aragón, municipality in Zaragoza
- Pozuelo de Tábara, municipality in Zamora
- Pozuelo del Páramo, municipality in León
- El Pozuelo, municipality in Cuenca
- Pozuelo de Calatrava, municipality in Ciudad Real
- Pozuelo del Rey, municipality in the Community of Madrid
- Pozuelo Oeste (Madrid Metro)
- Pozuelo de la Orden, municipality in Valladolid
- Pozuelo de Zarzón, municipality in Cáceres
- San Bartolomé, Pozuelo, parish church in the small town of Pozuelo

== Other ==
- CF Pozuelo de Alarcón, football club
- CF Pozuelo de Alarcón Femenino, football club
