= Prado de la Vega (Madrid Metro) =

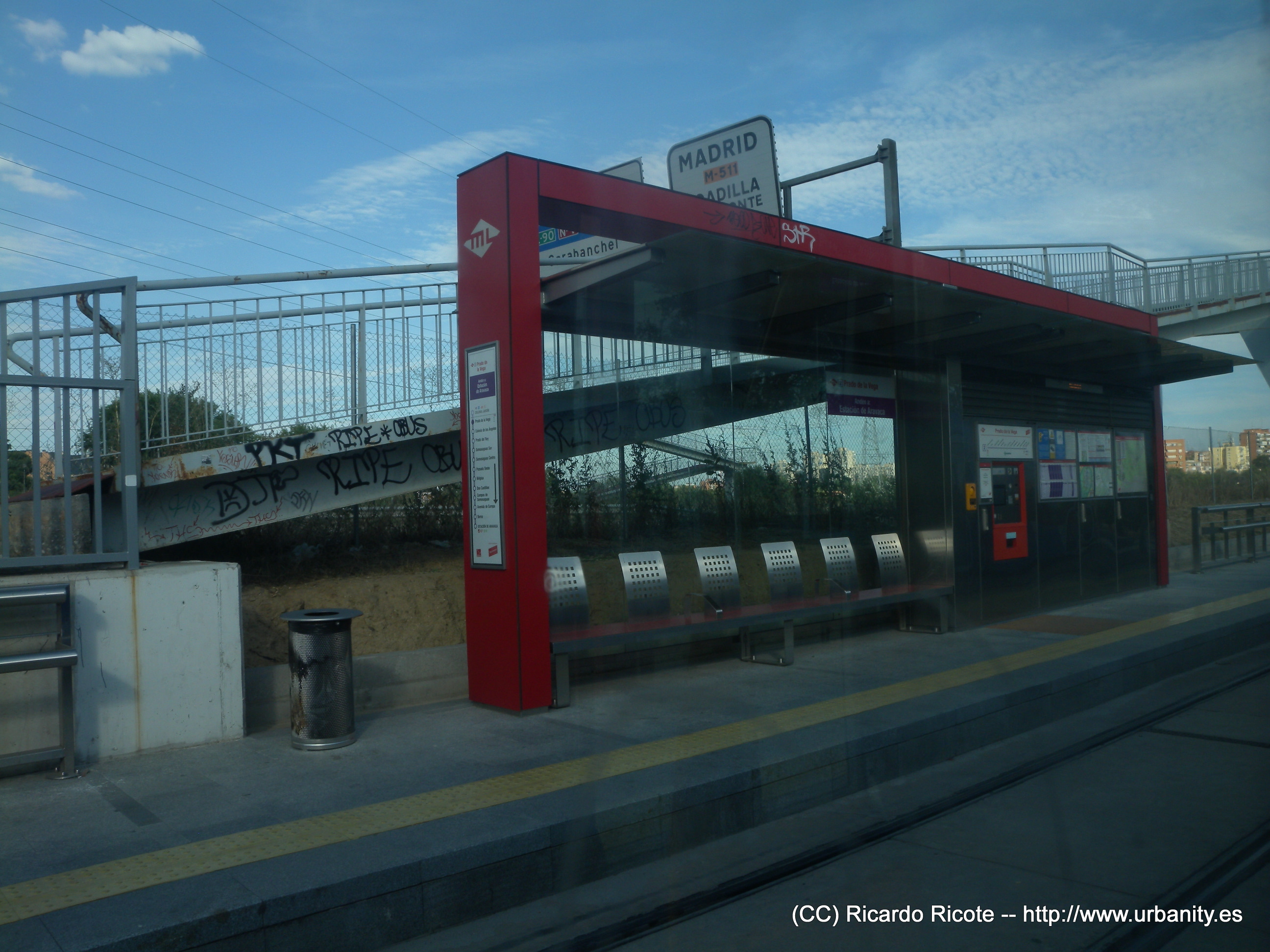

General information
- Location: Pozuelo de Alarcón, Madrid; Spain
- Coordinates: 40.4022955°N 3.7812125°W
- System: Madrid Metro station
- Owner: CRTM
- Operator: Metro Oeste

Other information
- Fare zone: B1

History
- Opened: 27 July 2007; 19 years ago

Services
Preceding station	Madrid Metro	Following station
Colonia Jardín Terminus	Line ML-2	Colonia de los Ángeles towards Estación de Aravaca
Location
- Location within Madrid

Prado de la Vega [ˈpɾa.ðo ðe la ˈβeɣa] is a station on Line 2 of the Metro Ligero. It is located in fare Zone B1.
