= Somosaguas Sur (Madrid Metro) =

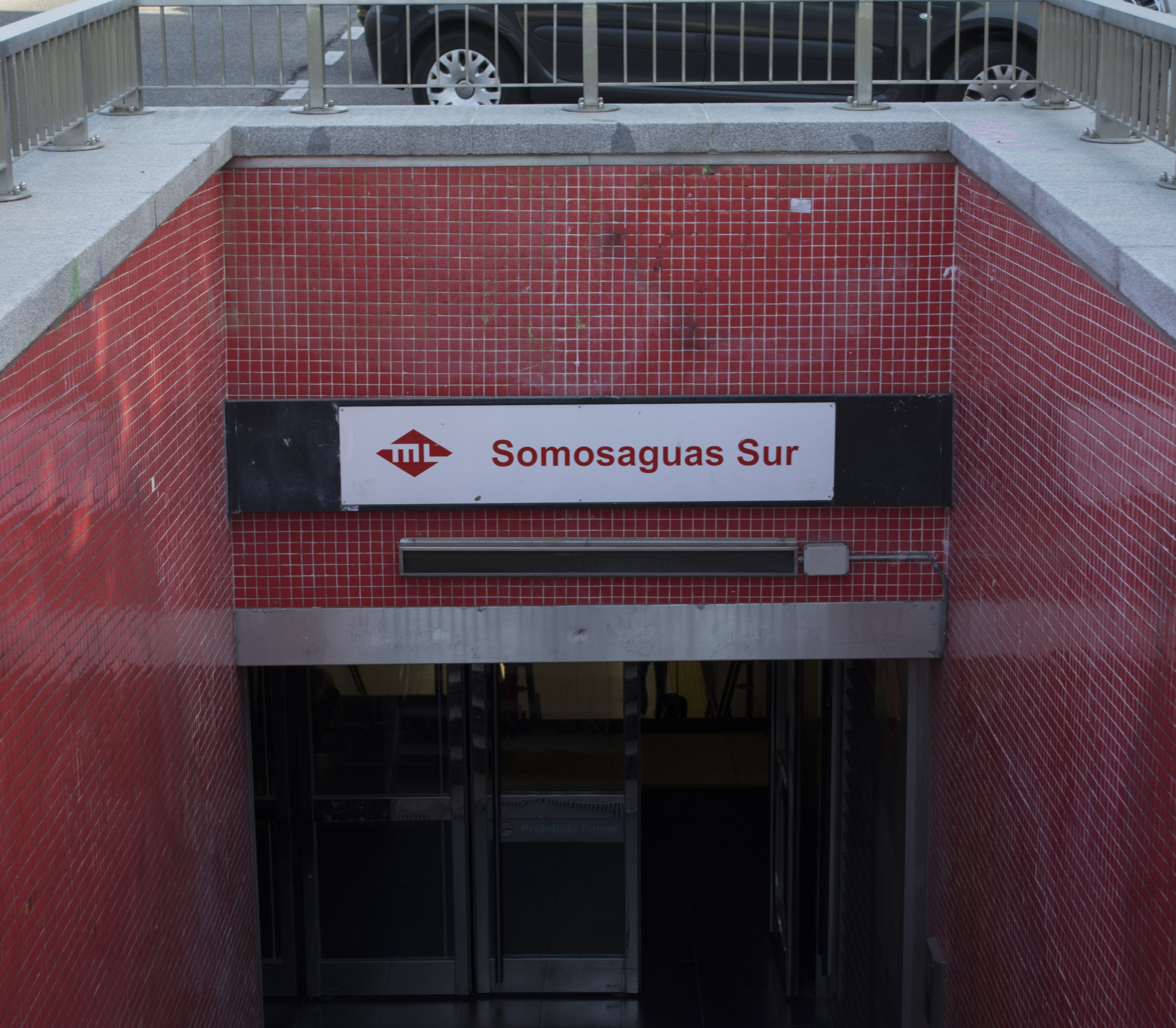

General information
- Location: Pozuelo de Alarcón, Madrid; Spain
- Coordinates: 40.4153629°N 3.7925254°W
- System: Madrid Metro station
- Owner: CRTM
- Operator: Metro Oeste

Other information
- Fare zone: B1

History
- Opened: 27 July 2007; 19 years ago

Services
| Preceding station | Madrid Metro | Following station |
|---|---|---|
| Prado del Rey towards Colonia Jardín | Line ML-2 | Somosaguas Centro towards Estación de Aravaca |
Location
- Location within Madrid

Somosaguas Sur [somoˈsaɣwas ˈsuɾ] is a station on Line 2 of the Metro Ligero. It is located in fare Zone B1.
