= Dos Castillas (Madrid Metro) =

Railway station in Pozuelo de Alarcón, Spain

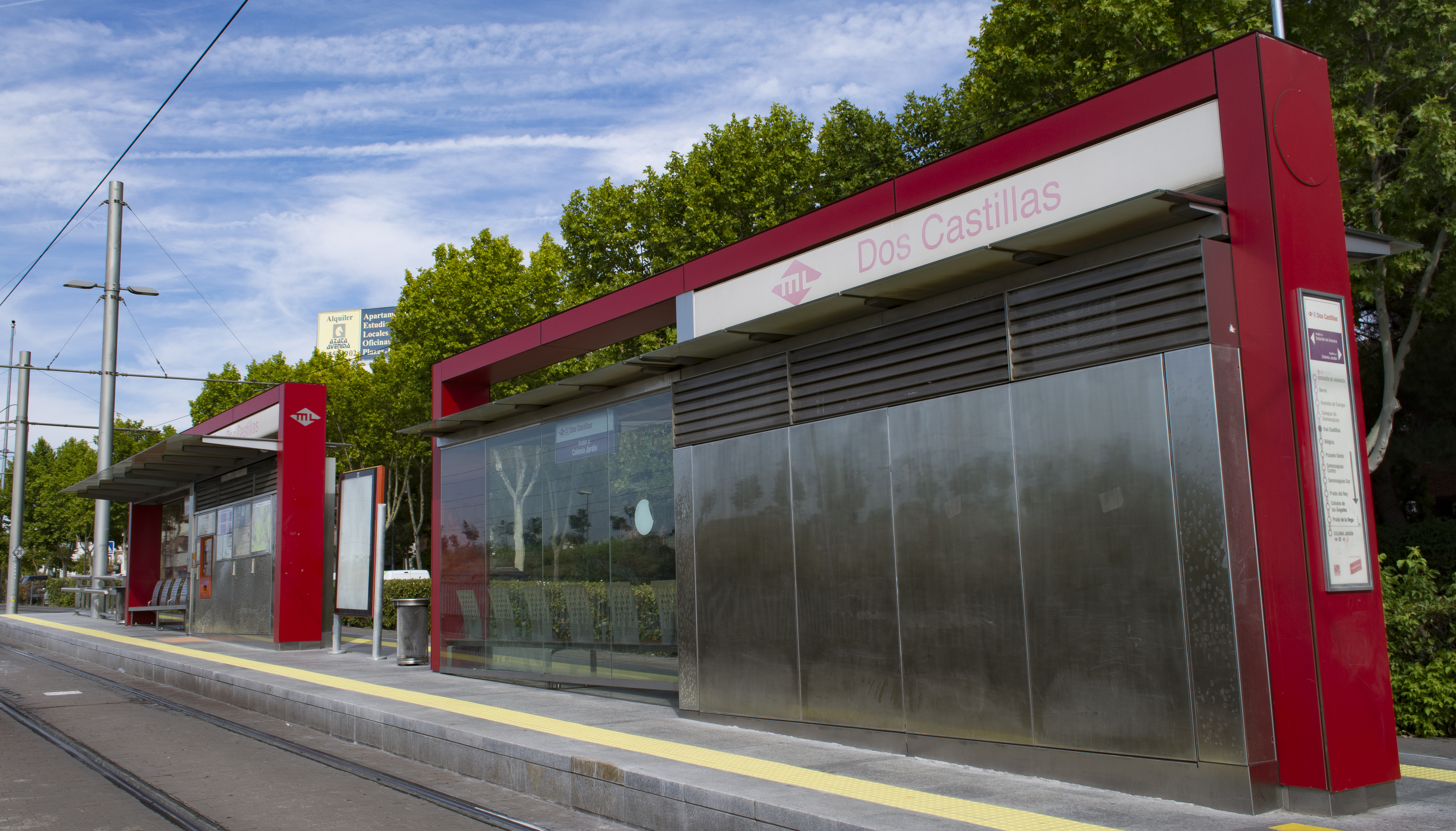

General information
- Location: Pozuelo de Alarcón, Madrid; Spain
- Coordinates: 40.4325346°N 3.801616°W
- System: Madrid Metro station
- Owner: CRTM
- Operator: Metro Oeste

Other information
- Fare zone: B1

History
- Opened: 27 July 2007; 19 years ago

Services
Preceding station	Madrid Metro	Following station
Bélgica towards Colonia Jardín	Line ML-2	Campus de Somosaguas towards Estación de Aravaca
Location
- Location within Madrid

Dos Castillas [ˈdos kasˈtiʝas] is a station on Line 2 of the Metro Ligero, servicing Madrid, Spain. It is located in fare Zone B1.
