= Campus de Somosaguas (Madrid Metro) =

Metro station in Madrid, Spain

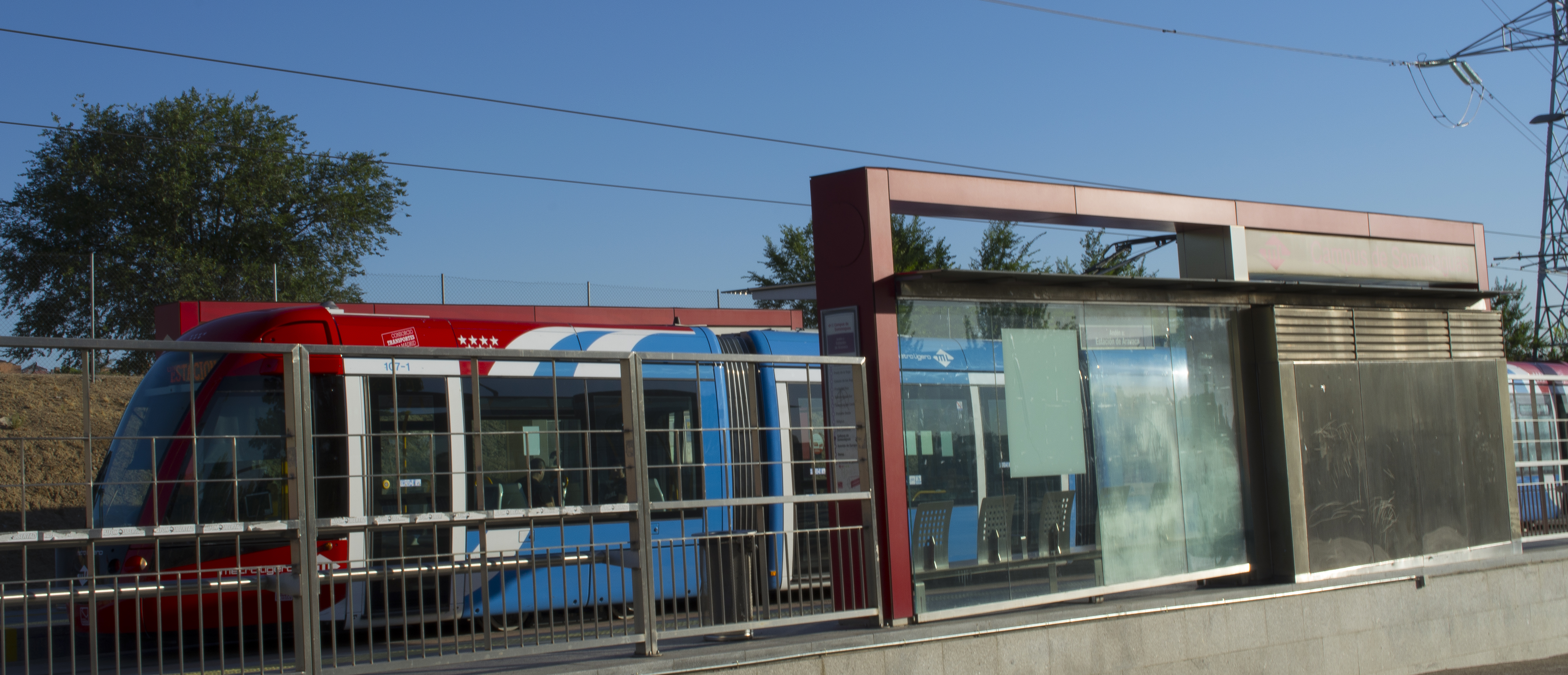

General information
- Location: Pozuelo de Alarcón, Madrid; Spain
- Coordinates: 40.4333803°N 3.7952478°W
- System: Madrid Metro station
- Owner: CRTM
- Operator: Metro Oeste

Other information
- Fare zone: B1

History
- Opened: 27 July 2007; 19 years ago

Services
Preceding station	Madrid Metro	Following station
Dos Castillas towards Colonia Jardín	Line ML-2	Avenida de Europa towards Estación de Aravaca
Location
- Location within Madrid

Campus de Somosaguas [ˈkampus ðe somoˈsaɣwas] is a station on Line 2 of the Metro Ligero. It is located in fare Zone B1.
