= Prado del Rey (Madrid Metro) =

Tramway station in Pozuelo de Alarcón, Madrid, Spain

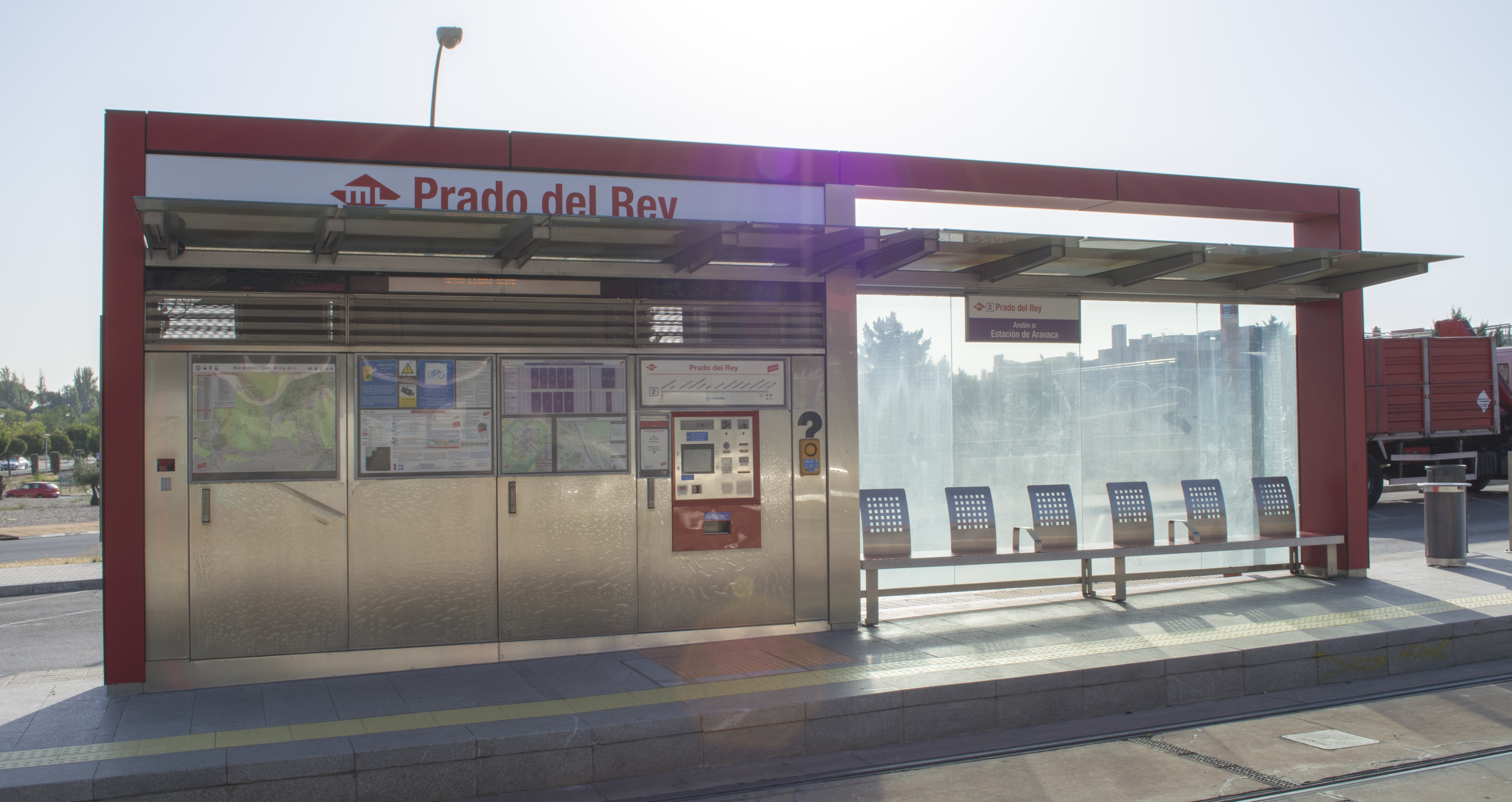

General information
- Location: Pozuelo de Alarcón, Madrid; Spain
- Coordinates: 40.4104693°N 3.7874826°W
- System: Madrid Metro station
- Owner: CRTM
- Operator: Metro Oeste

Other information
- Fare zone: B1

History
- Opened: 27 July 2007; 19 years ago

Services
| Preceding station | Madrid Metro | Following station |
|---|---|---|
| Colonia de los Ángeles towards Colonia Jardín | Line ML-2 | Somosaguas Sur towards Estación de Aravaca |
Location
- Location within Madrid

Prado del Rey [ˈpɾa.ðo ðel ˈrej] is a station on Line 2 of the Metro Ligero. It is located in fare Zone B1.

It serves nearby Radiotelevisión Española (RTVE) central headquarters and production center.
