= Avenida de Europa =

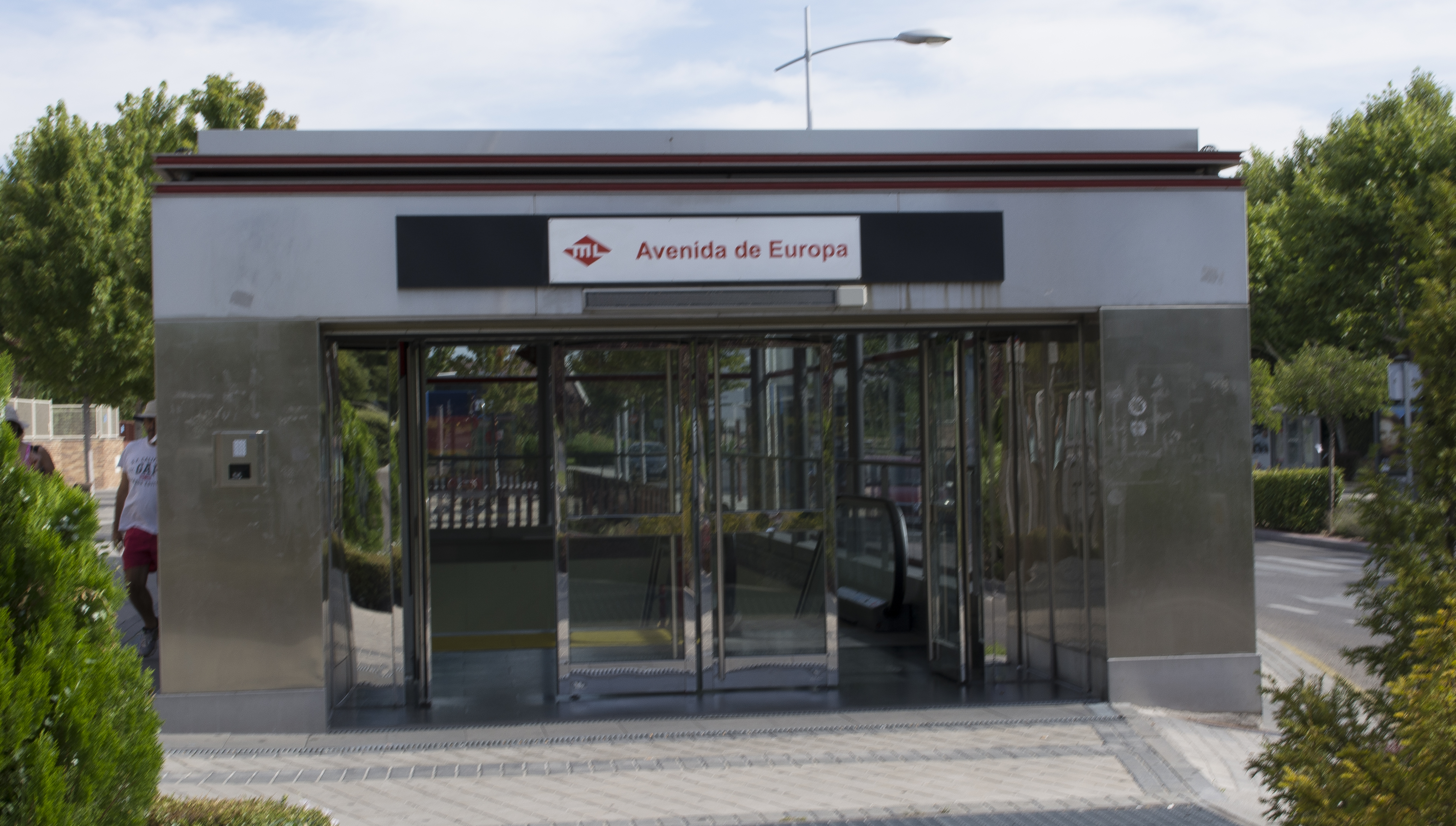

General information
- Location: Pozuelo de Alarcón, Madrid; Spain
- Coordinates: 40.4393053°N 3.7930537°W
- System: Madrid Metro station
- Owner: CRTM
- Operator: Metro Oeste

Other information
- Fare zone: B1

History
- Opened: 27 July 2007; 19 years ago

Services
Preceding station	Madrid Metro	Following station
Campus de Somosaguas towards Colonia Jardín	Line ML-2	Berna towards Estación de Aravaca
Location
- Location within Madrid

Avenida de Europa [aβeˈniða ðe ewˈɾo.pa] is a station on Line 2 of the Metro Ligero. It is in fare Zone B1.
