= Somosaguas Centro (Madrid Metro) =

Spanish metro station

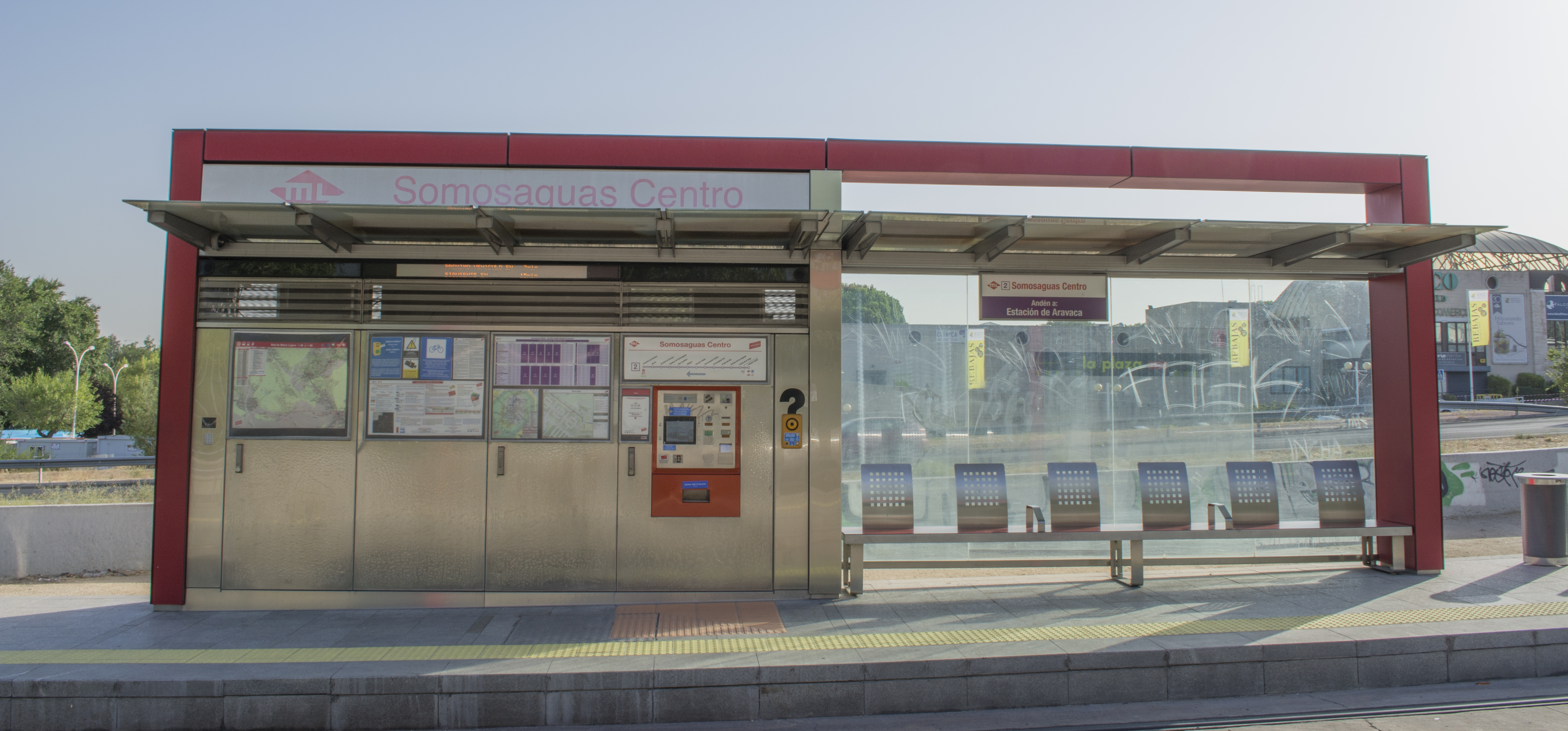

General information
- Location: Pozuelo de Alarcón, Madrid; Spain
- Coordinates: 40.4193653°N 3.798737°W
- System: Madrid Metro station
- Owner: CRTM
- Operator: Metro Oeste

Other information
- Fare zone: B1

History
- Opened: 27 July 2007; 19 years ago

Services
Preceding station	Madrid Metro	Following station
Somosaguas Sur towards Colonia Jardín	Line ML-2	Pozuelo Oeste towards Estación de Aravaca
Location
- Location within Madrid

Somosaguas Centro [somoˈsaɣwas ˈθen.tɾo] is a station on Line 2 of the Metro Ligero. It is located in fare Zone B1.
