= Berna (Madrid Metro) =

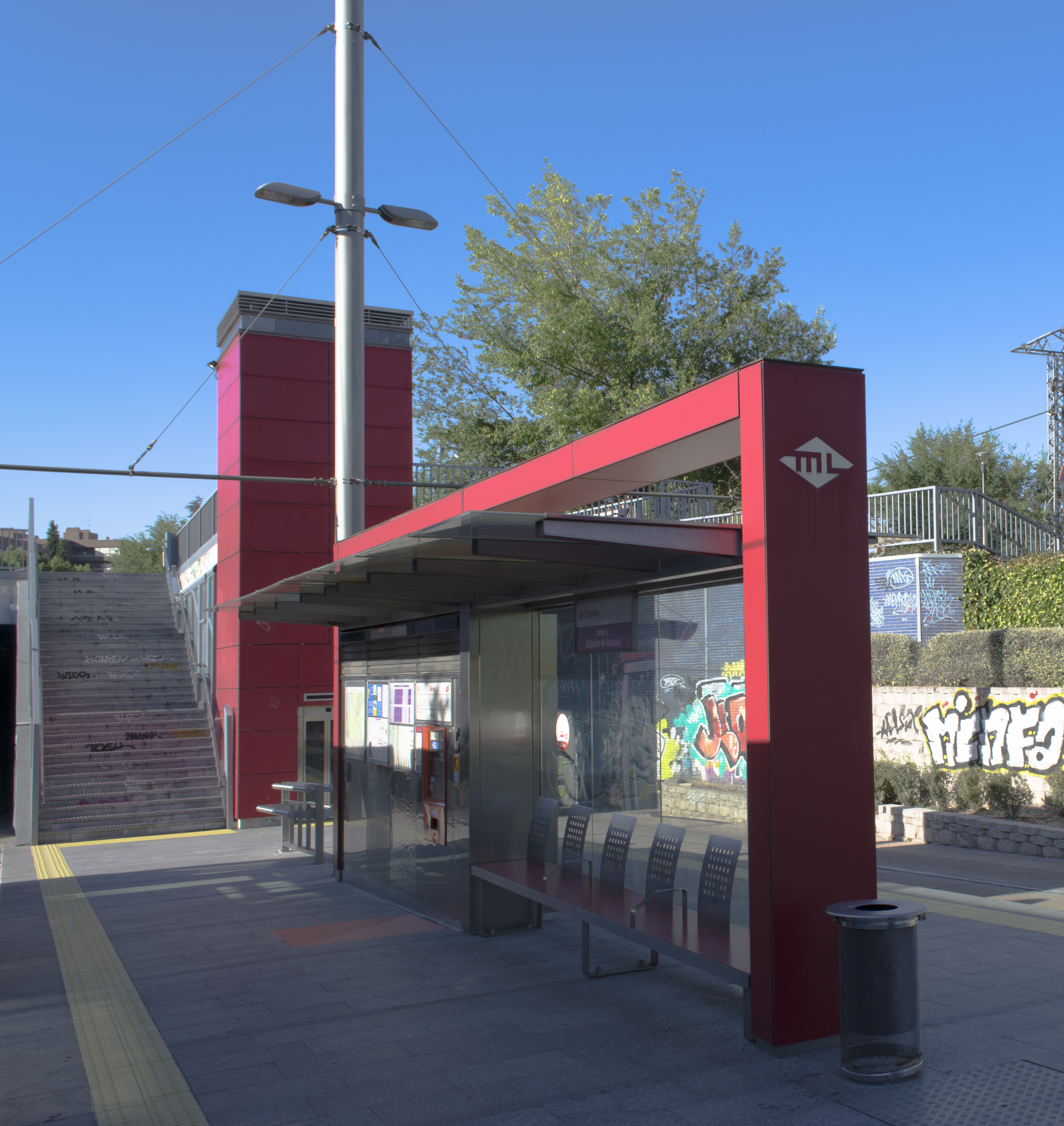

General information
- Location: Pozuelo de Alarcón, Madrid; Spain
- Coordinates: 40.4448676°N 3.7911969°W
- System: Madrid Metro station
- Owner: CRTM
- Operator: Metro Oeste

Other information
- Fare zone: B1

History
- Opened: 27 July 2007; 19 years ago

Services
Preceding station	Madrid Metro	Following station
Avenida de Europa towards Colonia Jardín	Line ML-2	Estación de Aravaca Terminus
Location
- Location within Madrid

Berna [ˈbeɾ.na] is a station on Line 2 of the Metro Ligero. It is located in fare Zone B1.
