= San Bartolomé, Pozuelo =

Church building in Pozuelo, Spain

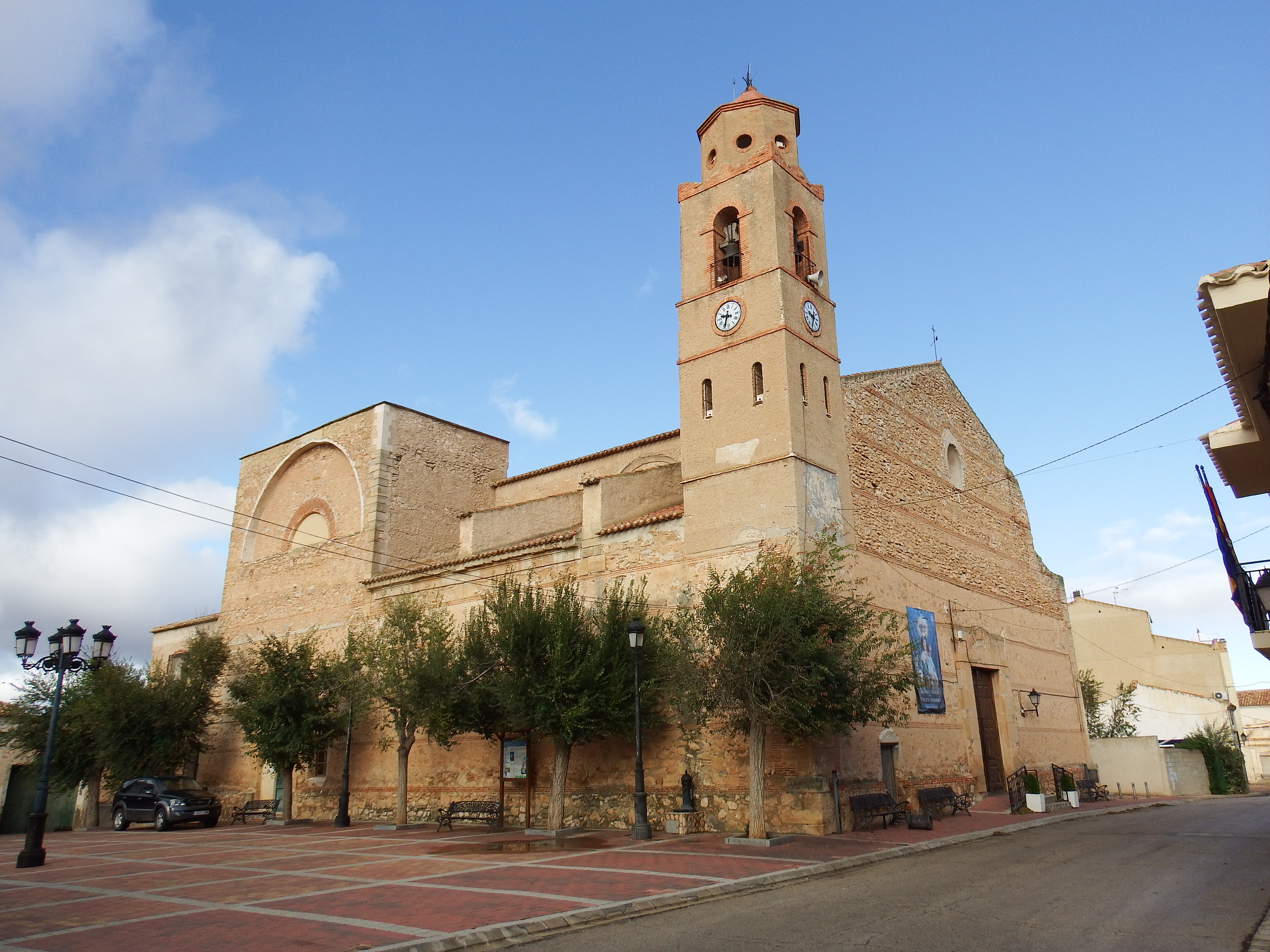

San Bartolomé is a Roman Catholic parish church in the small town of Pozuelo in the province of Albacete, in Castile-La Mancha, Spain.

== History ==
In the early eighteenth century, Pozuelo, under the jurisdiction of Peñas de San Pedro, had a small church in ruinous state. In 1772, cult moved to the nearby chapel of San Francisco, an oratory of the Confraternity of the Sangre de Cristo y Animas. In 1774, it was decided to build a new church. Work was slow and funds insufficient.

The new church was erected in 1810, although it soon required restructuring, and it was feared that the dome would collapse. In 1863, a consultation with the provincial architect Don Jose Maria Prado; but by 1864, there was a partial collapse of the nave roof. The bell-tower was erected at this time. Repairs continued until 1895. After Spanish civil war, the 19th-century tower was demolished.

Recently the church has been remodeled by architects Enrique and Fernando Moro Garví.
