= El Pozuelo =

El Pozuelo, Spain
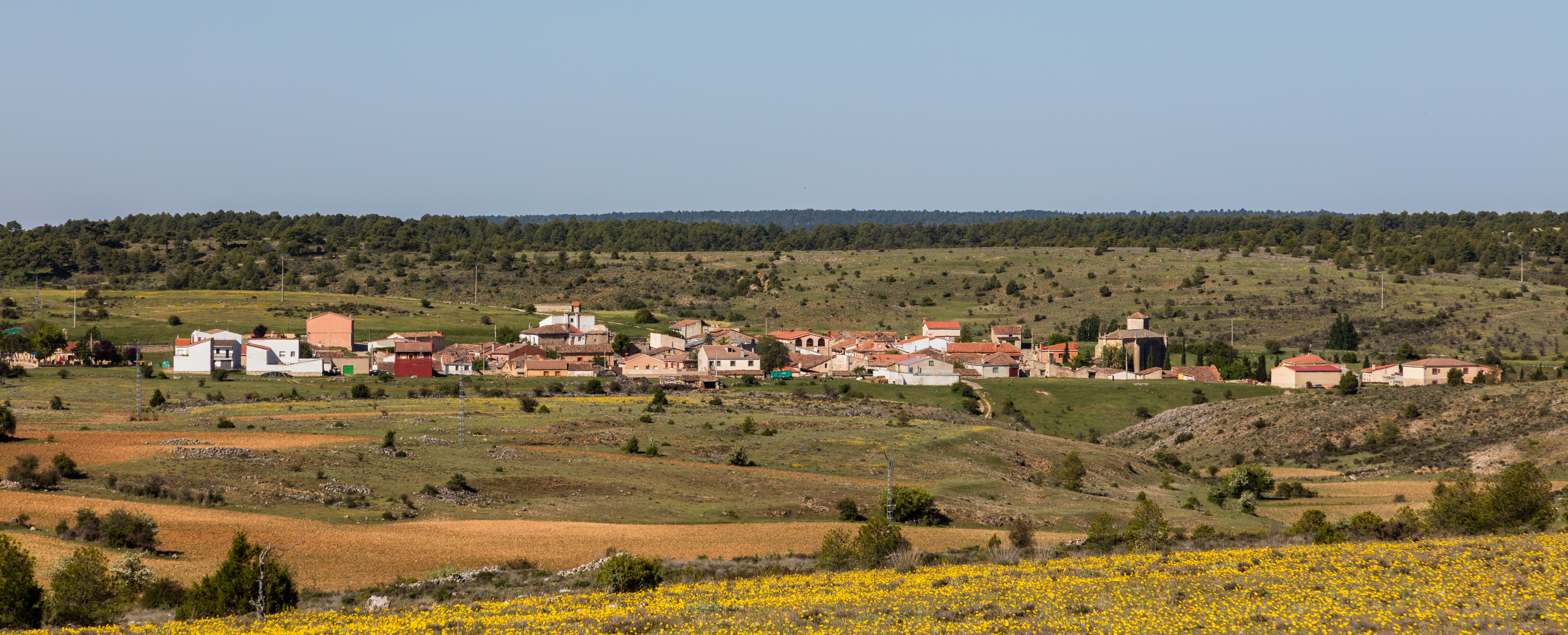

- Location within Spain Location within Castilla-La Mancha
- Coordinates: 40°37′13″N 2°16′37″W
- Country: Spain
- Autonomous community: Castile-La Mancha
- Province: Cuenca
- Municipality: El Pozuelo

Area
  - Total: 41 km^{2} (16 sq mi)

Population (2025-01-01)
  - Total: 47
  - Density: 1.1/km^{2} (3.0/sq mi)
- Time zone: UTC+1 (CET)
  - Summer (DST): UTC+2 (CEST)

El Pozuelo is a municipality located in the province of Cuenca, Castile-La Mancha, Spain. According to the 2004 census (INE), the municipality has a population of 113 inhabitants.
