= Pozuelo del Páramo =

Coordinates: 42°10′N 5°46′W

Pozuelo del Páramo, Spain
- Flag Coat of arms
- Interactive map of Pozuelo del Páramo, Spain
- Country: Spain
- Autonomous community: Castile and León
- Province: León
- Municipality: Pozuelo del Páramo

Area
  - Total: 36 km^{2} (14 sq mi)

Population (2025-01-01)
  - Total: 374
  - Density: 10/km^{2} (27/sq mi)
- Time zone: UTC+1 (CET)
  - Summer (DST): UTC+2 (CEST)

Pozuelo del Páramo is a municipality located in the province of León, Castile and León, Spain. According to the 2004 census (INE), the municipality has a population of 559 inhabitants.

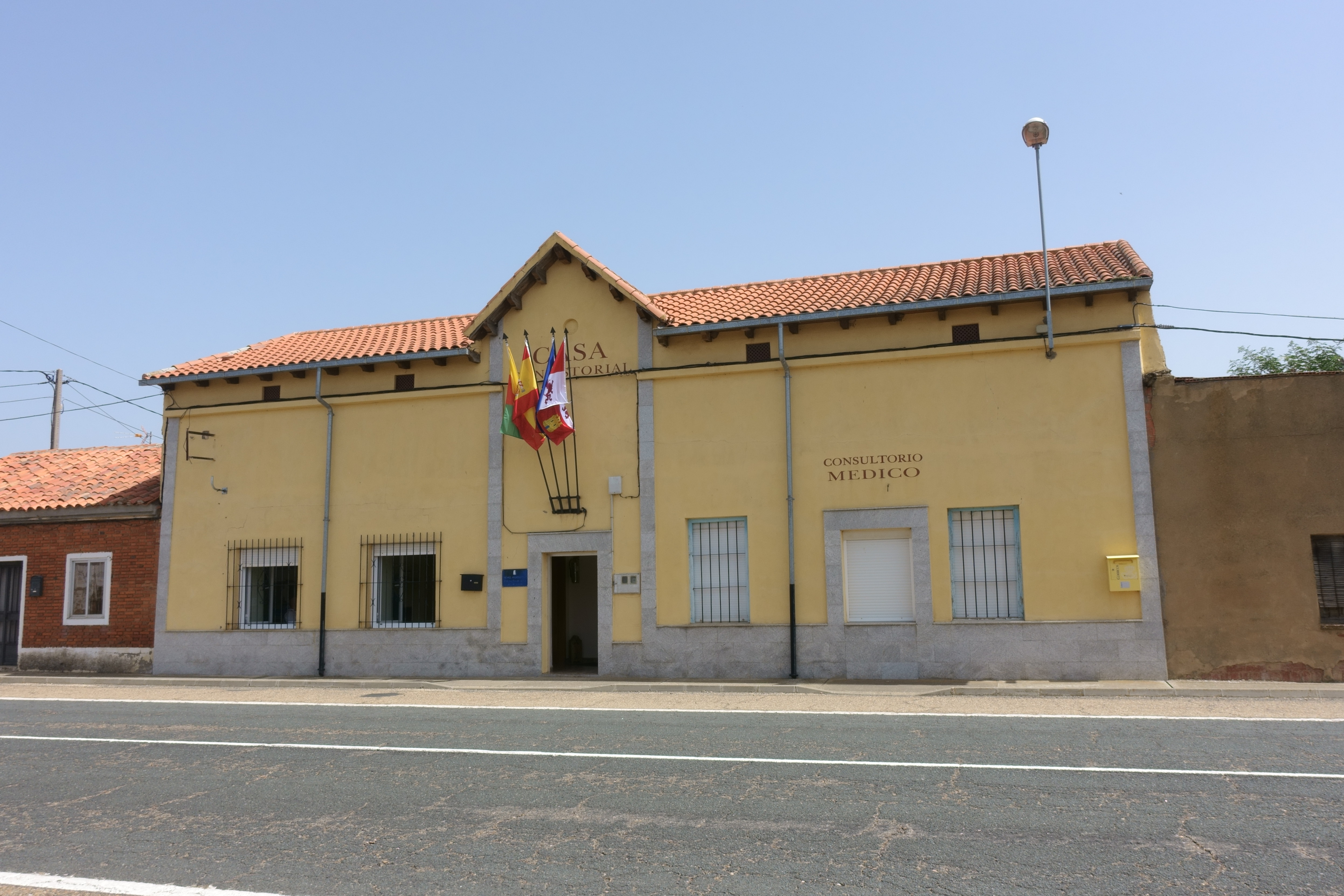
Town hall of Pozuelo del Páramo
