= Pozuelo, Spain =

Municipality in Albacete, Castile-La Mancha, Spain

Coordinates: 38°48′00″N 2°07′00″W

Coat of arms of Pozuelo, Albacete

Pozuelo is a municipality in Albacete, Castile-La Mancha, Spain. It has a population of 470. It is the home of the parish church of San Bartolomé.
