= Estación de Aravaca (Madrid Metro) =

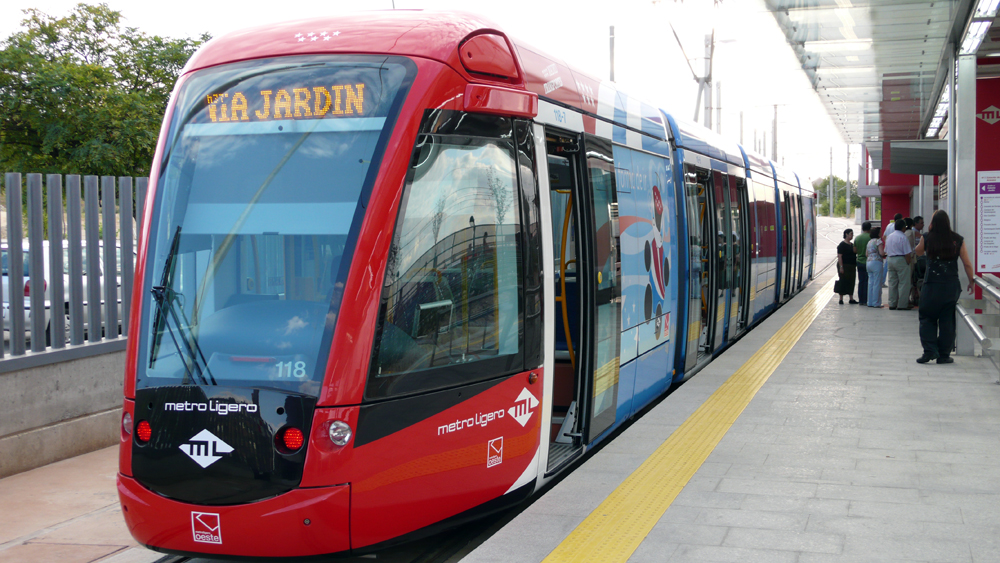

General information
- Location: Moncloa-Aravaca, Madrid; Spain
- Coordinates: 40.4483271°N 3.7859073°W
- System: Madrid Metro station
- Owner: CRTM
- Operator: Metro Oeste

Other information
- Fare zone: A

History
- Opened: 27 July 2007; 19 years ago

Services
Preceding station	Madrid Metro	Following station
Berna towards Colonia Jardín	Line ML-2	Terminus
Location
- Location within Madrid

Estación de Aravaca [estaˈθjon de aɾaˈβaka] is a station on Line 2 of the Metro Ligero. It is located in fare Zone A.
